= 1971 =

1971 in various calendars
- Gregorian calendar: 1971; MCMLXXI
- Ab urbe condita: 2724
- Armenian calendar: 1420; ԹՎ ՌՆԻ
- Assyrian calendar: 6721
- Baháʼí calendar: 127–128
- Balinese saka calendar: 1892–1893
- Bengali calendar: 1377–1378
- Berber calendar: 2921
- British Regnal year: 19 Eliz. 2 – 20 Eliz. 2
- Buddhist calendar: 2515
- Burmese calendar: 1333
- Byzantine calendar: 7479–7480
- Chinese calendar: 庚戌年 (Metal Dog); 4668 or 4461 — to — 辛亥年 (Metal Pig); 4669 or 4462
- Coptic calendar: 1687–1688
- Discordian calendar: 3137
- Ethiopian calendar: 1963–1964
- Hebrew calendar: 5731–5732
- Hindu calendars
- Vikram Samvat: 2027–2028
- Shaka Samvat: 1892–1893
- Kali Yuga: 5071–5072
- Holocene calendar: 11971
- Igbo calendar: 971–972
- Iranian calendar: 1349–1350
- Islamic calendar: 1390–1391
- Japanese calendar: Shōwa 46 (昭和４６年)
- Javanese calendar: 1902–1903
- Juche calendar: 60
- Julian calendar: Gregorian minus 13 days
- Korean calendar: 4304
- Minguo calendar: ROC 60 民國60年
- Nanakshahi calendar: 503
- Thai solar calendar: 2514
- Tibetan calendar: ལྕགས་ཕོ་ཁྱི་ལོ་ (male Iron-Dog); 2097 or 1716 or 944 — to — ལྕགས་མོ་ཕག་ལོ་ (female Iron-Boar); 2098 or 1717 or 945
- Unix time: 31536000 – 63071999

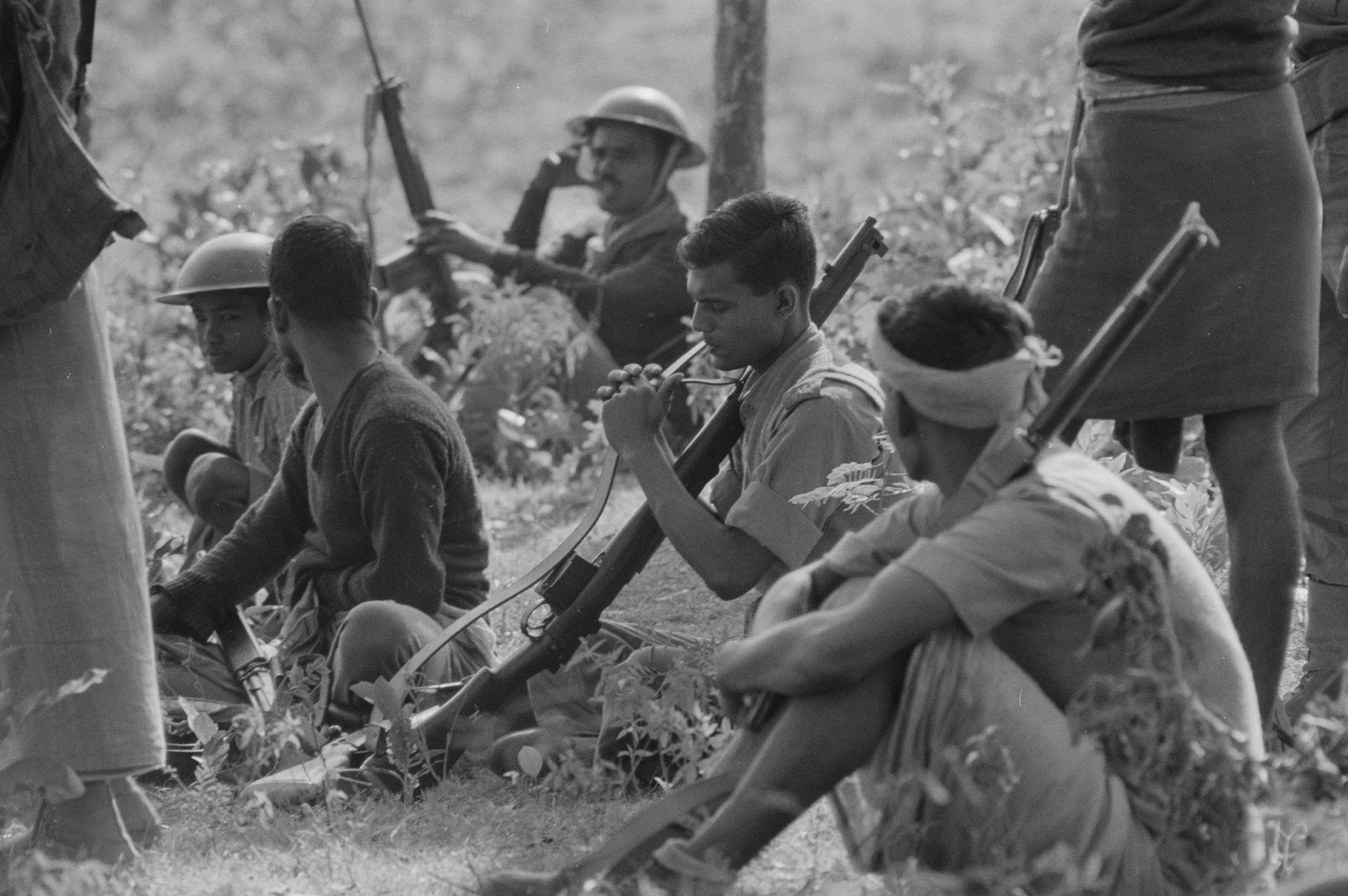
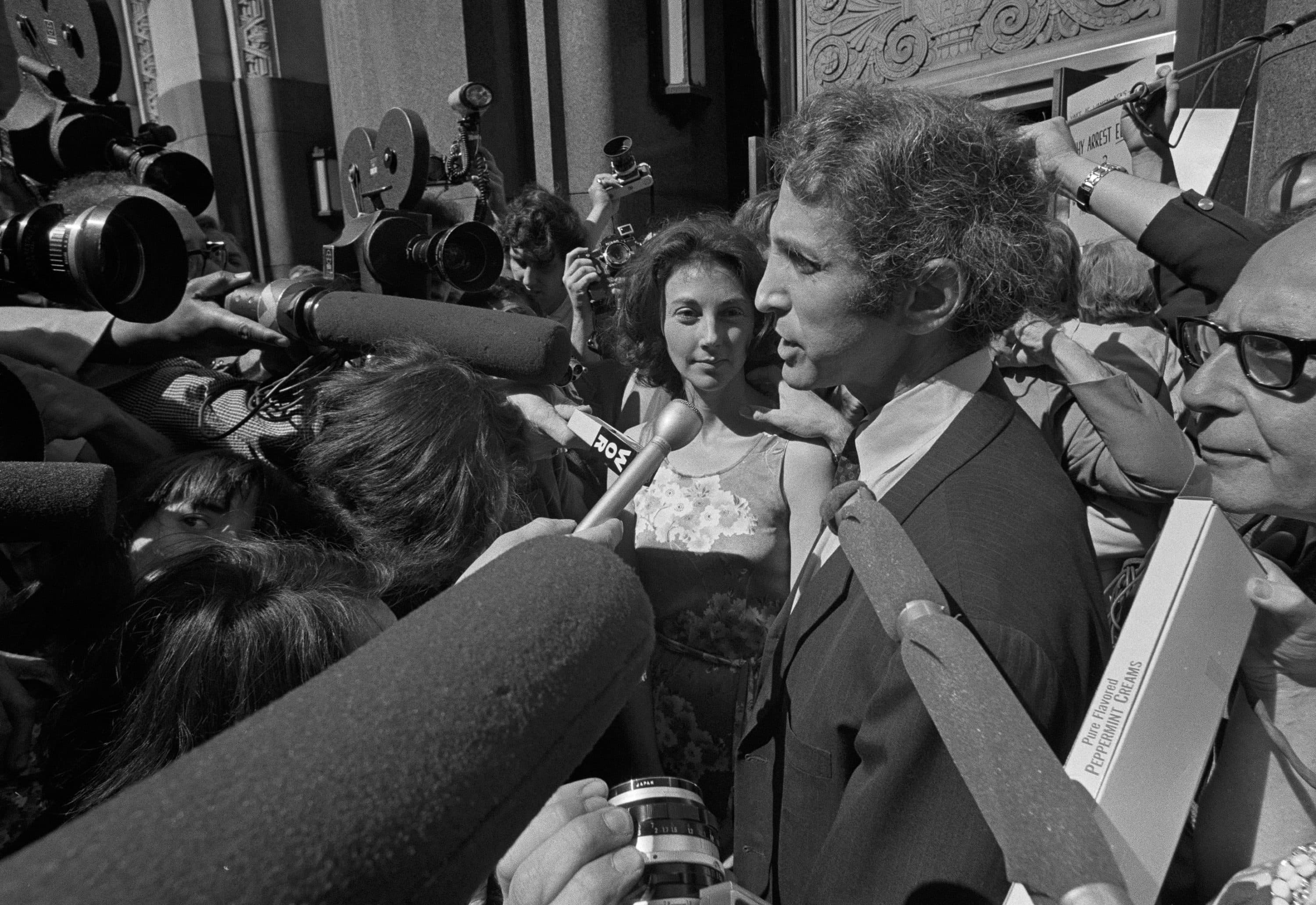
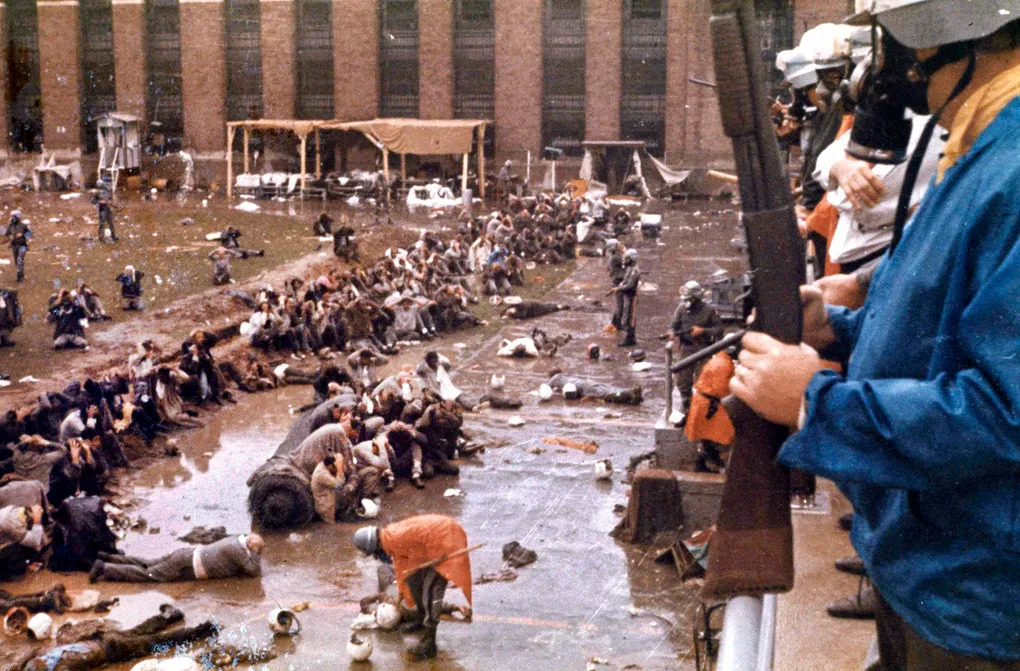
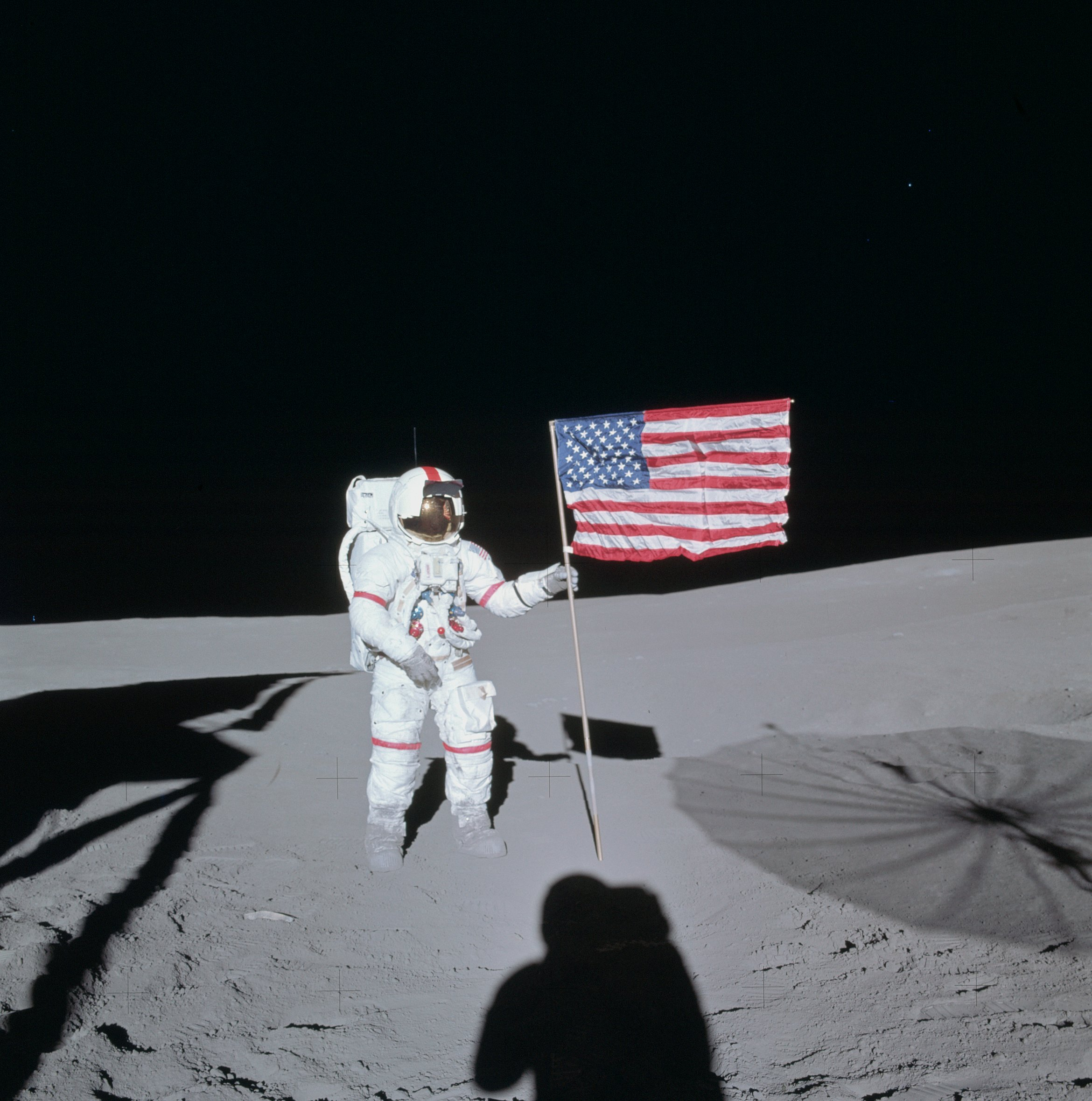
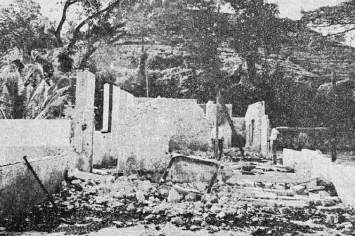
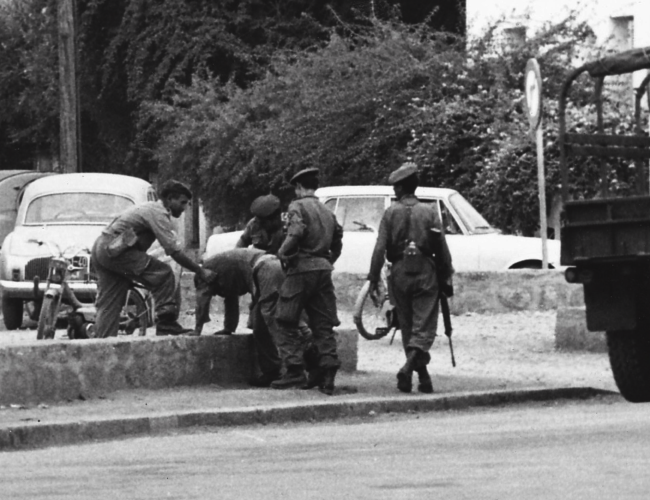
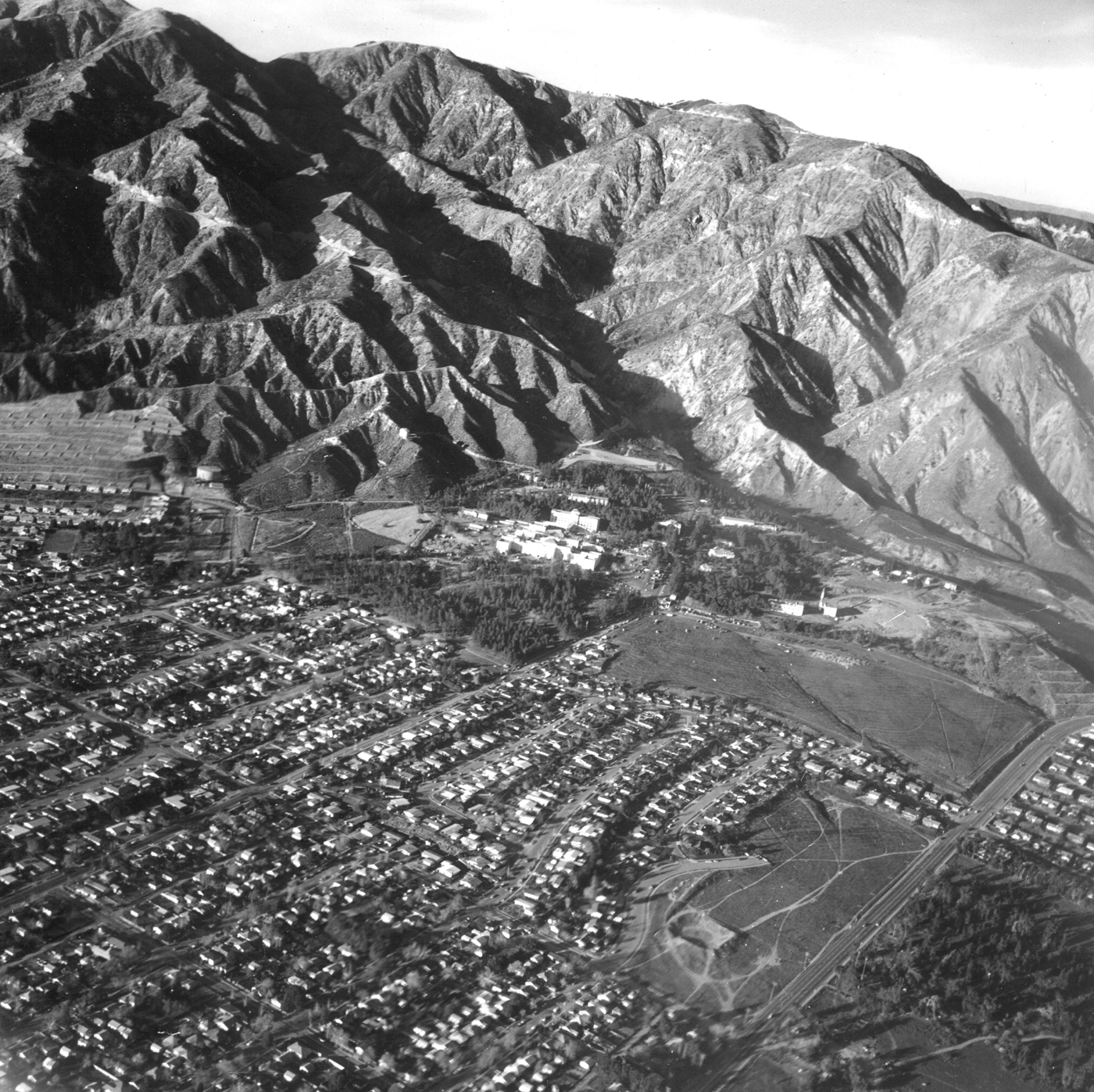
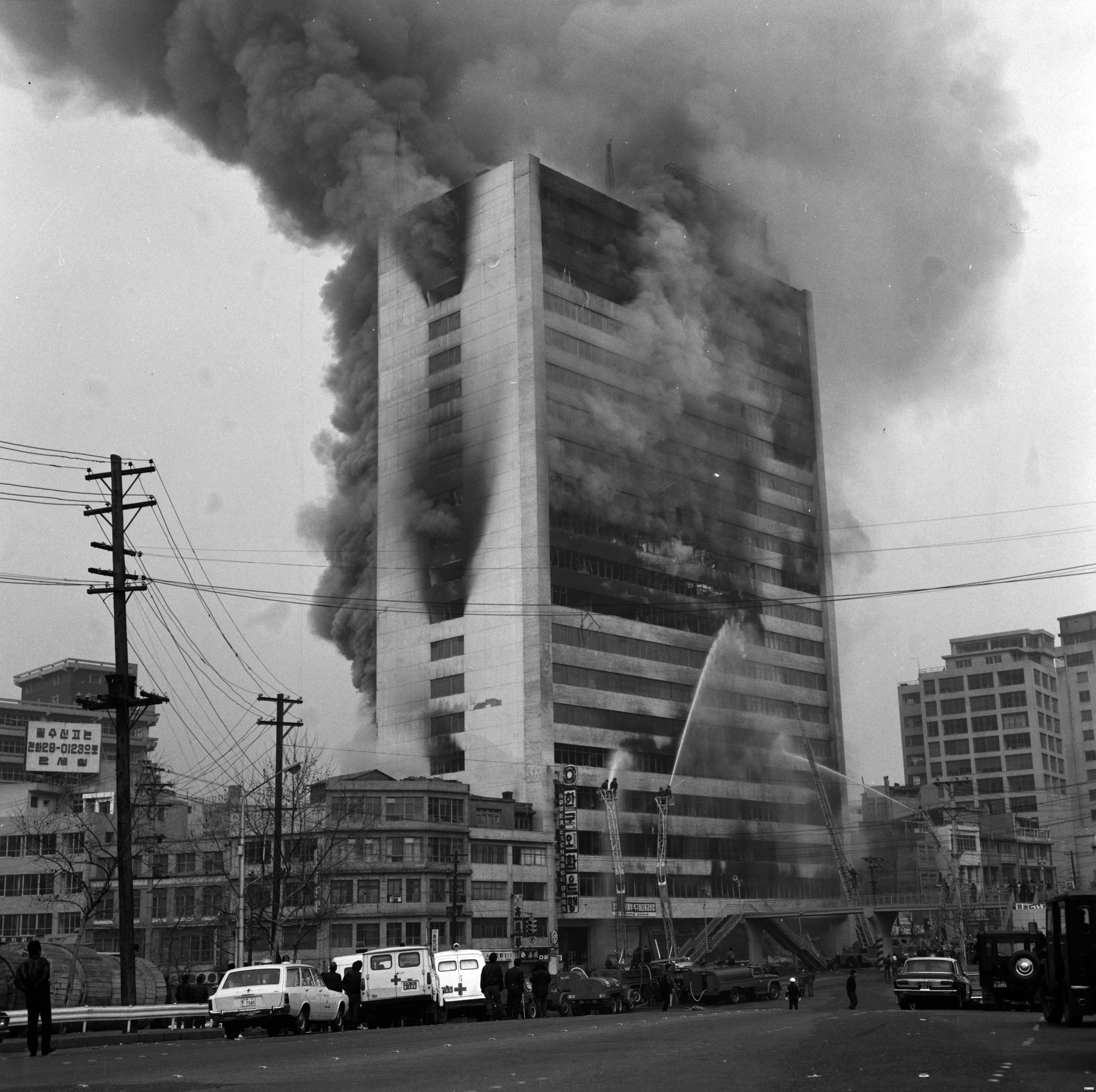
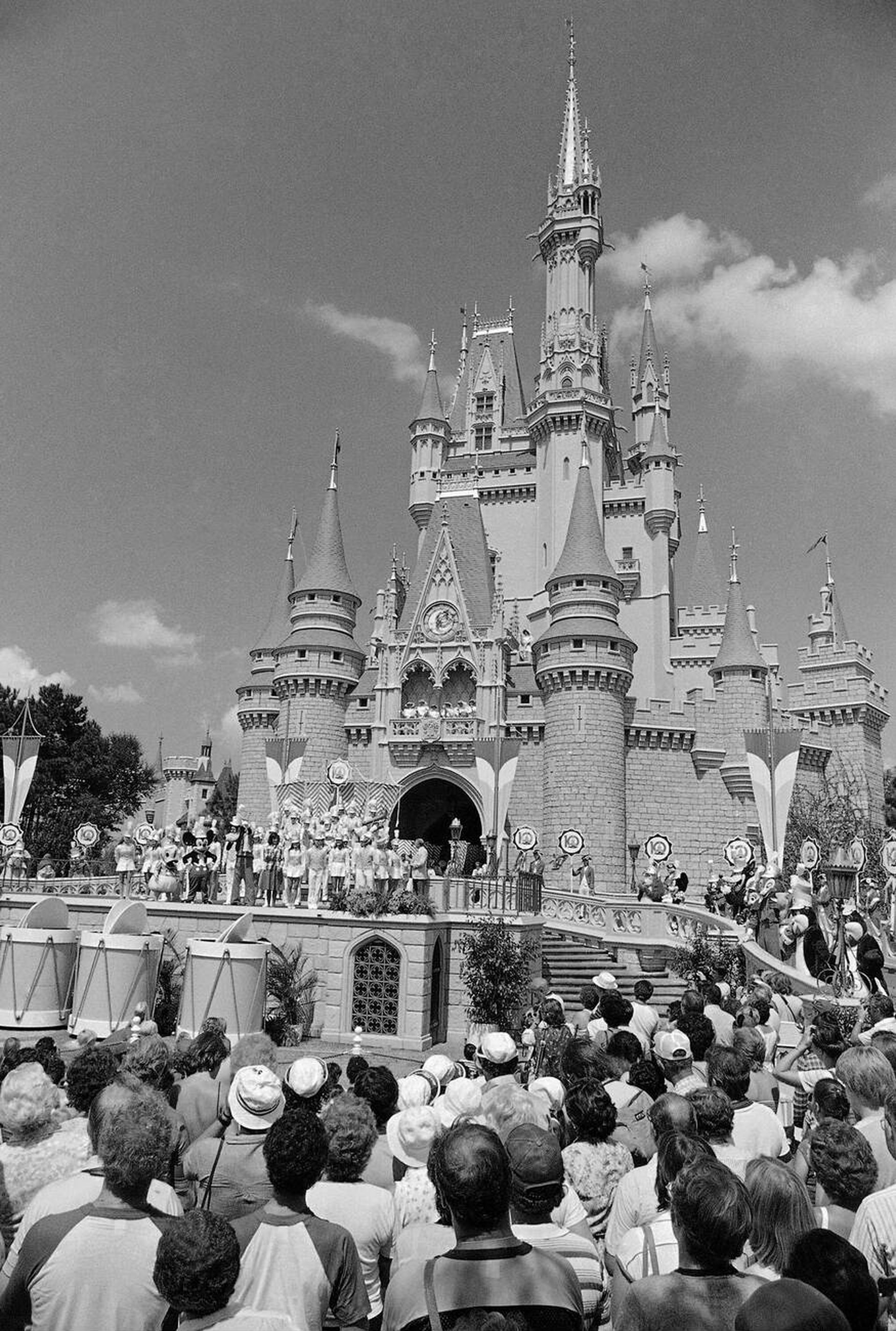
From top to bottom, left to right: the Bangladesh Liberation War leads to the independence of Bangladesh amid the deadly Bangladesh genocide; the Pentagon Papers reveal secret U.S. Vietnam War policies; the Attica Prison riot ends in a violent crackdown; Apollo 14 lands on the Moon; the 1971 JVP insurrection erupts in Sri Lanka; the 1971 Moroccan coup attempt fails to depose King Hassan II; the 1971 San Fernando earthquake causes major damage in Southern California; the Daeyeonggak Hotel fire kills over 160 in Seoul; and Walt Disney World opens in Florida, becoming a major tourist destination.

1971 (MCMLXXI) was a common year starting on Friday of the Gregorian calendar, the 1971st year of the Common Era (CE) and Anno Domini (AD) designations, the 971st year of the 2nd millennium, the 71st year of the 20th century, and the 2nd year of the 1970s decade.

The year 1971 had three partial solar eclipses (February 25, July 22 and August 20) and two total lunar eclipses (February 10 and August 6).

The world population increased by 2.1% this year, the highest increase in history.

== Events ==
=== January ===
- January 1 – Fifth Street Women's Building Takeover: A coalition of over 100 feminists illegally occupy an abandoned city building in New York City. They establish a women's center, homeless shelter, food co-operative, and lesbian center before being raided by police 13 days later.
- January 2 – 1971 Ibrox disaster: During a crush at a football match, 66 people are killed and over 200 injured in Glasgow, Scotland.
- January 8 – Tupamaros kidnap Geoffrey Jackson, British ambassador to Uruguay, in Montevideo, keeping him captive until September.
- January 9 – Uruguayan president Jorge Pacheco Areco demands emergency powers for 90 days due to kidnappings, and receives them the next day.
- January 14 – Seventy Brazilian political prisoners are released in Santiago, Chile; Giovanni Enrico Bucher is released January 16.
- January 15 – The Aswan High Dam officially opens in Egypt.
- January 18
  - Strikes in Poland demand the resignation of Interior Minister Kazimierz Świtała. He resigns January 23 and is replaced by Franciszek Szlachcic.
  - Ivan Koloff defeats Bruno Sammartino for the WWWF World Heavyweight Championship in wrestling ending a seven and two thirds years reign, the longest in the Championships history.
  - A South Korean marine kills 6 people in a mass shooting in Kimpo, South Korea.
- January 19 – Representatives of 23 western oil companies begin negotiations with OPEC in Tehran to stabilize oil prices; February 14 they sign a treaty with 6 Arab states of the Persian Gulf.
- January 24 – The Guinean government sentences to death 92 Guineans who helped Portuguese troops in the failed landing attempts in November 1970; 72 are sentenced to hard labor for life; 58 of the sentenced are hanged the following day.
- January 25
  - In Uganda, Idi Amin deposes Milton Obote in a coup, and becomes president.
  - In Los Angeles, Charles Manson and 3 female "Family" members are found guilty of the 1969 Tate–LaBianca murders.
  - Himachal Pradesh becomes the 18th Indian state.
  - Intelsat IV (F2) is launched; it enters commercial service over the Atlantic Ocean March 26.
- January 29 – The last of its many UFO sightings is made at Pudasjärvi, Finland.
- January 31 – Apollo program: Apollo 14 (carrying astronauts Alan Shepard, Stuart Roosa, and Edgar Mitchell) lifts off on the third successful lunar landing mission.

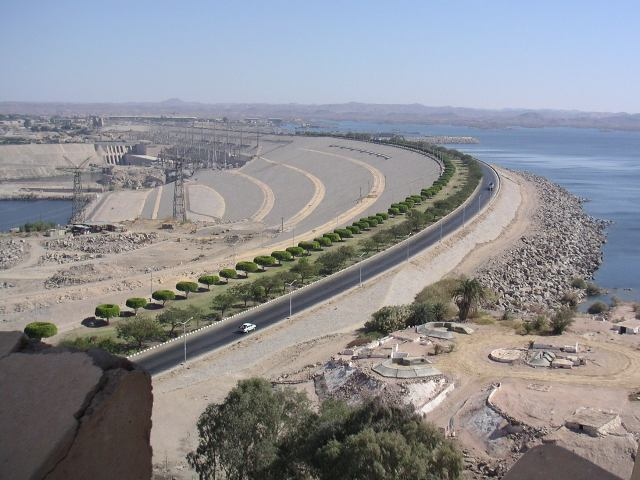
January 15: Aswan Dam opens in Egypt.

=== February ===
- February 4
  - In Britain, Rolls-Royce goes bankrupt and is nationalised.
  - The Nasdaq stock exchange is founded in New York City.
- February 5 – Apollo 14 lands on the Moon.
- February 6 – The 4.6 Mb Tuscania earthquake shakes the Italian province of Viterbo with a maximum Mercalli intensity of VIII (Severe), causing 24 deaths, 150 injuries and extreme damage.
- February 7
  - Switzerland gives women voting rights in state elections, but not in all canton-specific ones.
  - Władysław Gomułka is expelled from the Central Council of the Polish Communist Party.
- February 8 – A new stock market index called the Nasdaq Composite debuts in the United States.
- February 9
  - The 6.5–6.7 M_{w} Sylmar earthquake hits the Greater Los Angeles Area with a maximum Mercalli intensity of XI (Extreme), killing 64 and injuring 2,000.
  - Apollo program: Apollo 14 returns to Earth after the third human Moon landing.
- February 10 – A total lunar eclipse is visible from Pacific, Americas, Europe and Africa, and is the 50th lunar eclipse of Lunar Saros 123.
- February 11 – The US, UK, USSR and others sign the Seabed Treaty, outlawing nuclear weapons on the ocean floor.
- February 11–12 – Palestinian and Jordanian fighters clash in Amman.
- February 13 – Vietnam War: Backed by American air and artillery support, South Vietnamese troops invade Laos.
- February 15 – Decimal Day: The United Kingdom and Ireland both switch to decimal currency (see also decimalisation).
- February 16 – In Italy, a local parliament elects the city of Catanzaro as the capital of Calabria; residents of Reggio di Calabria riot for 5 days because of the decision.
- February 20 – The U.S. Emergency Broadcast System sends an erroneous warning across the nation's radio and television stations, meant to be a standard weekly test conducted by NORAD in Cheyenne Mountain in Colorado. Some stations cease broadcasting until the message is rescinded, as required by federal rules, while most ignore it.
- February 21
  - The Convention on Psychotropic Substances is signed at Vienna.
  - Between February 21 and 22, an outbreak of nineteen tornadoes rages across the Mississippi Delta in Mississippi and Louisiana, killing 123 people.
- February 23 – Operation Lam Son 719: South Vietnamese General Do Cao Tri is killed in a helicopter crash en route to taking control of the faltering campaign.
- February 25 – A partial solar eclipse is visible from Europe, Africa and Asia, and is the 18th solar eclipse of Solar Saros 149.
- February 26 – Secretary General U Thant signs the United Nations proclamation of the March equinox (March 21) as Earth Day.
- February 27 – Doctors in the first Dutch abortion clinic (Mildredhuis in Arnhem) start to perform abortions.
- February 28 – Evel Knievel sets a world record and jumps 19 cars on a motorbike in Ontario, California.

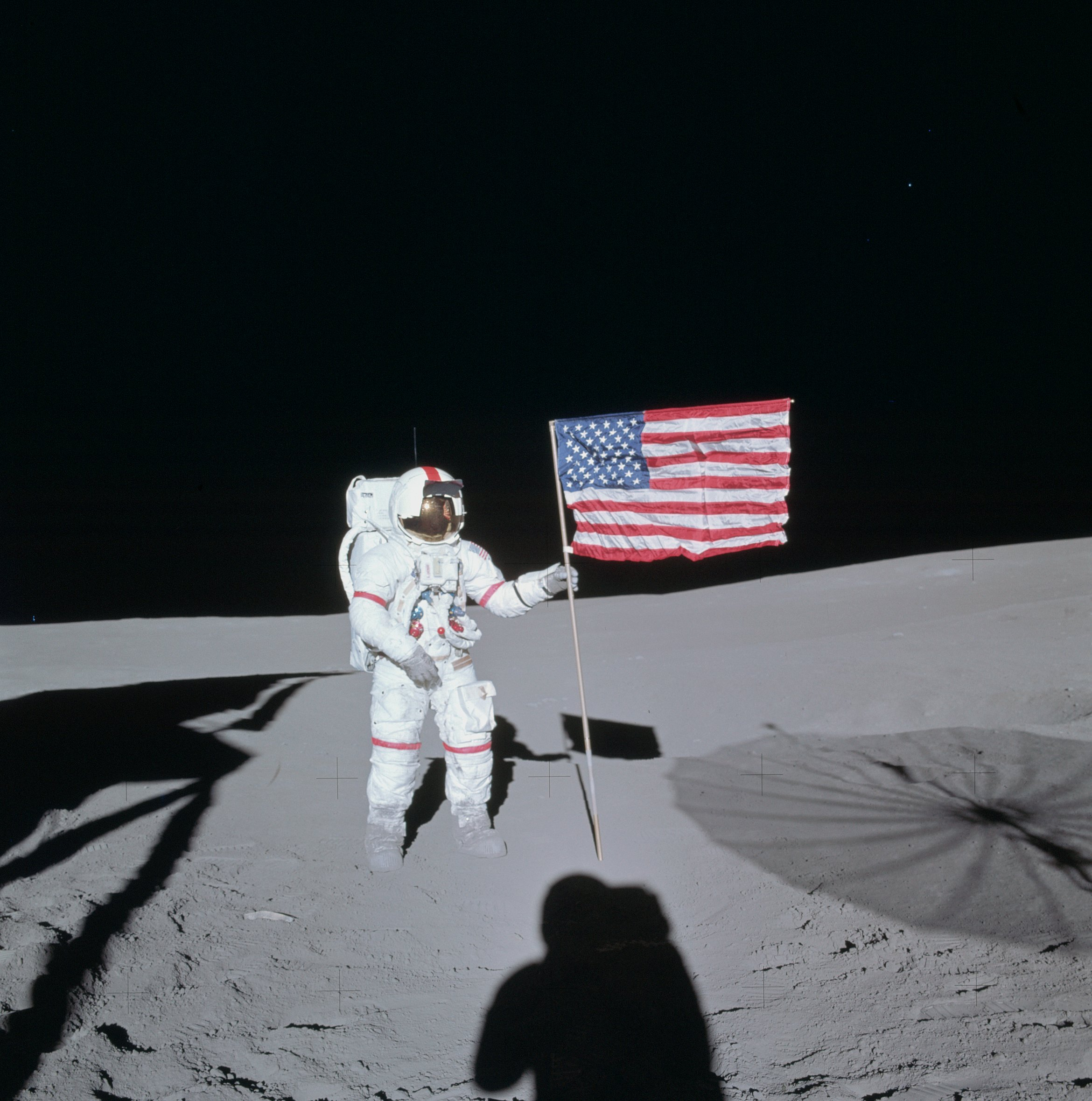
February 5: Apollo 14 on Moon

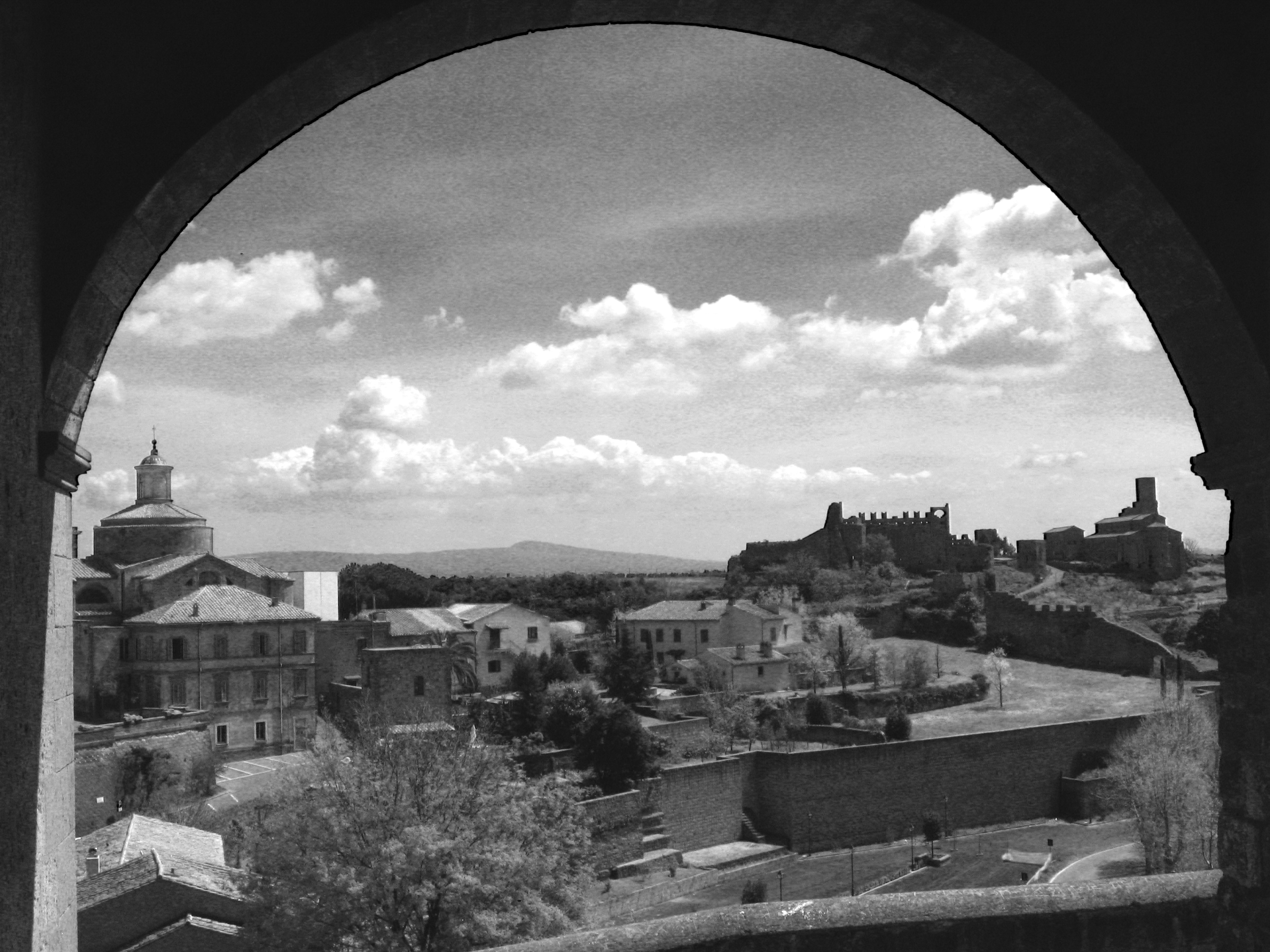
February 6: Earthquake in Tuscania, Italy.

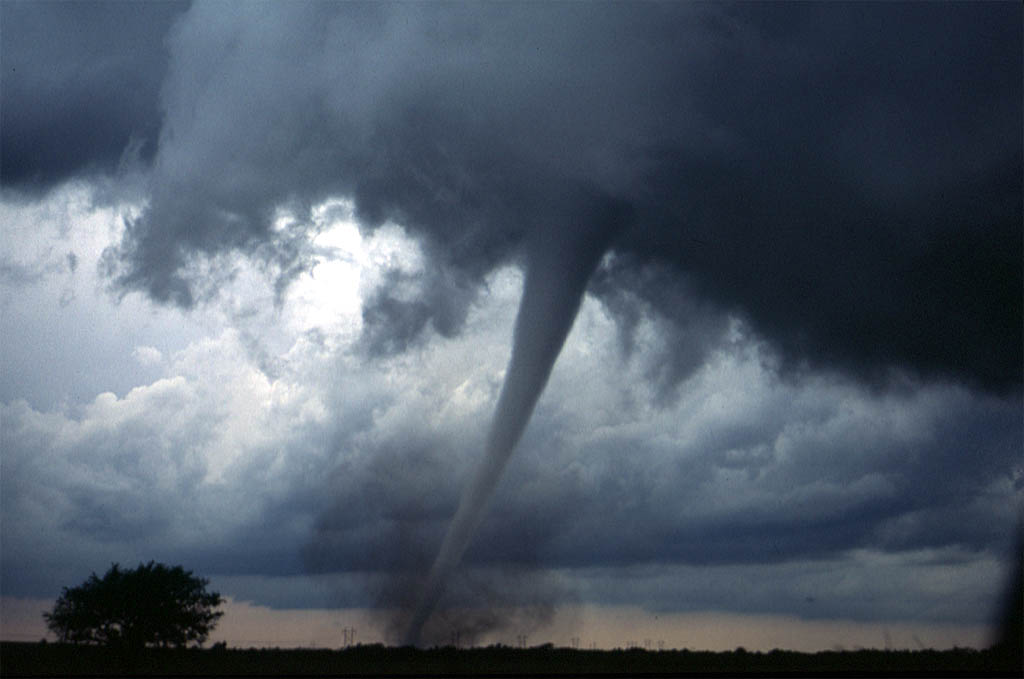
February 21: Tornadoes kill over 100 in the U.S. state of Mississippi.

=== March ===
- March 1
  - A bomb explodes in the men's room at the United States Capitol; the Weather Underground claims responsibility.
  - Pakistani president Agha Muhammad Yahya Khan indefinitely postpones the pending National Assembly session, precipitating massive civil disobedience in East Pakistan.
  - Canadian John Robarts ends his term of office as the 17th Premier of Ontario.
- March 2 – All-Pakistan Awami League leader Sheikh Mujibur Rahman launched the non-cooperation movement in East Pakistan.
- March 4 – The southern part of Quebec, and especially Montreal, receives 16 1/2" (42 cm) of snow in what becomes known as the Century's Snowstorm (la tempête du siècle).
- March 5
  - The Pakistani army occupies East Pakistan.
  - In Belfast, a Led Zeppelin show includes the first public performance of "Stairway to Heaven," a song from the band's fourth album.
- March 6 – A fire in a mental hospital in Burghölzli, Switzerland kills 28 people.
- March 7
  - Die Sendung mit der Maus airs its first episode on Das Erste.
  - The British postal workers' strike, led by UPW General Secretary Tom Jackson, ends after 47 days.
  - Sheikh Mujibur Rahman, political leader of East Pakistan (modern day-Bangladesh), delivers a public speech at the Racecourse Field in Dhaka calling for masses to be prepared to fight for national independence.
- March 8
  - The Citizens' Commission to Investigate the FBI breaks into the Media, Pennsylvania offices of the Federal Bureau of Investigation and removes all of its files.
  - "Fight of the Century": Boxer Joe Frazier defeats Muhammad Ali in a 15-round unanimous decision at Madison Square Garden.
- March 10 – William McMahon replaces John Gorton as the Liberal/Country Coalition Prime Minister of Australia after Gorton resigns following a vote of confidence that was tied 33-all.
- March 11 – THX 1138, George Lucas' first full-length film, premieres in theaters.
- March 12 – Hafez al-Assad becomes president of Syria.
- March 16 – Trygve Bratteli forms a government in Norway.
- March 18 – A landslide in Chungar, Peru crashes into Yanawayin Lake, killing 200.
- March 23 – General Alejandro Lanusse of Argentina takes power in a military coup.
- March 25 – Bangladesh Liberation War: The Pakistani army starts Operation Searchlight in East Pakistan (now Bangladesh) at midnight after President Agha Muhammad Yahya Khan, a military ruler, voids election results that gave the Awami League an overwhelming majority in the parliament; start of the 1971 Bangladesh genocide. That ended the non-cooperation movement.
- March 26
  - Sheikh Mujibur Rahman is arrested by the Pakistan army.
  - East Pakistan's independence is declared by M. A. Hannan on the behalf of Sheikh Mujibur Rahman from Kalurghat Radio Station, Chittagong.
  - Nihat Erim (a former CHP member) forms the new government of Turkey (33rd government, composed mostly of technocrats).
- March 27 – East Pakistan's independence is declared by army major (later president of Bangladesh) Ziaur Rahman from Kalurghat Radio Station.
- March 29
  - U.S. Army lieutenant William Calley is found guilty of 22 murders during the My Lai Massacre and is sentenced to life in prison (he is later pardoned).
  - A Los Angeles jury recommends the death penalty for Charles Manson and female followers Susan Atkins, Patricia Krenwinkel and Leslie Van Houten.

=== April ===
- April 1 – The United Kingdom lifts all restrictions on gold ownership.
- April 5
  - In Ceylon, a group calling themselves the People's Liberation Front begins a rebellion against the Bandaranaike government.
  - Mount Etna erupts in Sicily.
- April 8 – A right-wing coup attempt is exposed in Laos.
- April 12 – Palestinians retreat from Amman to the north of Jordan.
- April 17
  - The People's Republic of Bangladesh forms under Sheikh Mujibur Rahman at Mujibnagor.
  - Libya, Syria and Egypt sign an agreement to form a confederation.
- April 19
  - The government of Bangladesh flees to India.
  - Sierra Leone becomes a republic.
  - The Soviet Union launches Salyut 1.
  - Charles Manson is sentenced to death in the United States; in 1972, the sentence for all California death-row inmates will be commuted to life imprisonment.
- April 20
  - Swann v. Charlotte-Mecklenburg Board of Education: The Supreme Court of the United States rules unanimously that busing of students may be ordered to achieve racial desegregation.
  - Cambodian prime minister Lon Nol resigns but remains effectively in power until the next elections.
  - National Public Radio (NPR) airs its first broadcast.
- April 21 – Siaka Stevens is sworn in as the first president of Sierra Leone.
- April 23 - The Rolling Stones release their ninth studio album Sticky Fingers.
- April 24
  - Soyuz 10 fails to dock with Salyut 1.
  - An estimated 200,000 people in Washington, D.C., and a further 125,000 in San Francisco march in protest against the Vietnam War.
- April 25
  - Todor Zhivkov is reelected as the leader of the Bulgarian Communist Party.
  - Franz Jonas is reelected as president of Austria.
- April 26 – The government of Turkey declares a state of siege in 11 provinces, including Ankara, in response to violent demonstrations.

=== May ===
- May 1
  - Amtrak begins intercity rail passenger service in the United States.
  - The Ceylonese government promises amnesty for guerillas who surrender before May 5.
- May 2 – In Ceylon, left-wing guerillas launch a series of assaults against public buildings.
- May 3
  - The Harris Poll finds that 60% of Americans are against the Vietnam War.
  - East German leader Walter Ulbricht resigns as Socialist Unity Party leader but retains the position of head of state.
  - 1971 May Day Protests: Anti-war militants attempt to disrupt government business in Washington, D.C.; police and military units arrest as many as 12,000, most of whom are later released.
- May 5
  - The U.S. dollar floods the European currency markets and especially threatens the Deutsche Mark; the central banks of Austria, Belgium, Netherlands and Switzerland stop the currency trading.
  - FedEx, the logistics and delivery service, founded in Little Rock, Arkansas, United States.
- May 6 – The government of Ceylon begins a major offensive against the People's Liberation Front.
- May 9 – Mariner 8 fails to launch.
- May 12 – An earthquake in Turkey destroys most of the city of Burdur.
- May 15 – Israeli ambassador to Turkey Efraim Elrom is kidnapped; he is found killed in Istanbul May 25.
- May 16 – A coup attempt is exposed and foiled in Egypt.
- May 18
  - The U.S. Congress formally votes to end funding for the American Supersonic Transport program.
  - The Montreal Canadiens win the Stanley Cup against the Chicago Black Hawks. The Canadiens became only the second team in NHL history to win the Cup in Game 7 on the road, and did so after the home team had won each of the previous six games in the series. This also marked Jean Béliveau's last NHL game.
- May 19 – Mars probe program: Mars 2 is launched by the Soviet Union.
- May 22 – An earthquake lasting 20 seconds destroys most of Bingöl, Turkey; more than 1,000 are killed and 10,000 are made homeless.
- May 23 – Aviogenex Flight 130 crashes at Rijeka Airport, Yugoslavia, killing 78 people, mostly British tourists.
- May 26
  - Austria and the People's Republic of China establish diplomatic relations.
  - Qantas agrees to pay $500,000 to bomb hoaxer/extortionist Mr. Brown (Peter Macari), who is later arrested.
- May 27
  - Six armed passengers hijack a Romanian passenger plane and force it to fly to Vienna.
  - Christie's auctions a diamond known as Deepdene; it is later found to be artificially colored.
- May 28 – Portugal resigns from UNESCO.
- May 30 – Mariner program: Mariner 9 is launched toward Mars.
- May 31 – The birth of Bangladesh is declared by the government in exile in territory formerly part of Pakistan.

=== June ===
- June – Massachusetts passes its Chapter 766 laws enacting special education.
- June 1 – Vietnam War: Vietnam Veterans for a Just Peace, claiming to represent the majority of U.S. veterans who served in Southeast Asia, speak against war protests.
- June 6
  - Soyuz program: Soyuz 11 (Vladislav Volkov, Georgi Dobrovolski, Viktor Patsayev) is launched.
  - A midair collision between Hughes Airwest Flight 706 Douglas DC-9 jetliner and a U.S. Marine Corps McDonnell Douglas F-4 Phantom jet fighter near Duarte, California claims 50 lives.
- June 10
  - Corpus Thursday: A student rally on the streets of Mexico City is roughly dispersed.
  - US rail company Amtrak has its first fatal accident when 11 people are killed and 163 injured in the derailment of the City of New Orleans train near Tonti, Illinois.
- June 11 – Neville Bonner becomes the first Indigenous Australian to sit in the Australian Parliament.
- June 13
  - Vietnam War: The New York Times begins to publish the Pentagon Papers.
  - Racing drivers Gijs van Lennep of the Netherlands and Helmut Marko of Austria win the 24 Hours of Le Mans in the Martini Racing Porsche 917K.
- June 14 – Norway begins oil production in the North Sea.
- June 17
  - Representatives of Japan and the United States sign the Okinawa Reversion Agreement, whereby the U.S. will return control of Okinawa.
  - President Richard Nixon declares the U.S. war on drugs.
- June 20 – Britain announces that Soviet space scientist Anatoly Fedoseyev has been granted asylum.
- June 21 – Britain begins new negotiations for EEC membership in Luxembourg.
- June 25 – Madagascar accuses the U.S. of conspiring to oust the government; the U.S. recalls its ambassador.
- June 28 – Assassin Jerome A. Johnson shoots Joe Colombo, boss of his eponymous crime family, in the head during an Italian-American rally, putting him in a coma.
- June 30
  - New York Times Co. v. United States: The U.S. Supreme Court rules that the Pentagon Papers may be published, rejecting government injunctions as unconstitutional prior restraint.
  - After a successful mission aboard Salyut 1, the world's first human-occupied space station, the crew of the Soyuz 11 spacecraft die after their air supply leaks out through a faulty valve.

=== July ===
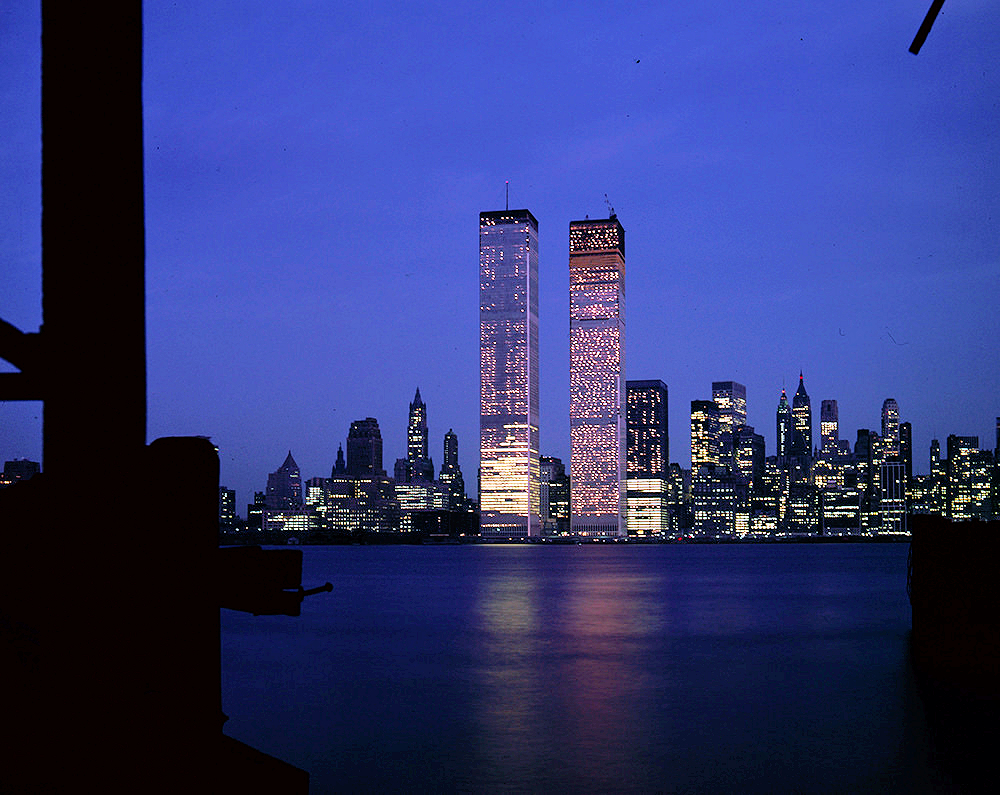
World Trade Center, Lower Manhattan, 1971

- July – Nordic Council secretariat inaugurated.
- July 3 – Jim Morrison, lead singer of The Doors, dies of a heart failure at the age of 27 in the bathtub of his apartment on the 3rd floor of the Rue Beautreillis 17 in Paris, France.
- July 4
  - Michael S. Hart posts the first e-book, a copy of the United States Declaration of Independence, on the University of Illinois at Urbana–Champaign's mainframe computer, the origin of Project Gutenberg.
  - The first plane lands at Seychelles International Airport in Victoria, Seychelles (Mahe).
- July 5 – Right to vote: The Twenty-sixth Amendment to the United States Constitution, formally certified by President Richard Nixon, lowers the voting age from 21 to 18.
- July 6 – Hastings Banda is proclaimed President for Life of Malawi.
- July 9 – The United Kingdom increases the number of its troops in Northern Ireland to 11,000.
- July 10–11 – Coup attempt in Morocco: 1,400 cadets take over the king's palace for three hours and kill 28 people; 158 rebels die when the king's troops storm the palace (ten high-ranking officers are later executed for involvement).
- July 10 – Gloria Steinem makes her Address to the Women of America.
- July 11 – The nationalization of all large copper mines in Chile is completed.
- July 13
  - Ólafur Jóhannesson forms a government in Iceland.
  - Jordanian army troops launch an offensive against Palestinian guerillas in Jordan.
  - The Yugoslavian government begins allowing foreign companies to take their profits from the country.
  - Reggie Jackson's long home run, which hits a transformer on the roof of Tiger Stadium, helps the American League defeat the National League 6–4 in the Major League Baseball All-Star Game in Detroit.
- July 14 – Libya severs its diplomatic ties with Morocco.
- July 15 – American President Richard Nixon announces his 1972 visit to China.
- July 17 – Italy and Austria sign a treaty that ends the dispute (Südtirolfrage) regarding South Tyrol.
- July 18 – The Trucial States are formed in the Persian Gulf.
- July 19 – The South Tower of the World Trade Center in New York City tops out at 1,362 feet (415 m), making it the second-tallest building in the world after the North Tower that had topped out in December 1970.
- July 19–23 – Major Hashem al-Atta ousts Jaafar Muhammad al-Nimeiri in a military coup in Sudan. Fighting continues until July 22, when pro-Nimeiri troops regain power. Al-Atta and three officers are executed.
- July 22
  - A BOAC flight from London to Khartoum is ordered to land at Benghazi, Libya, where two leaders of the unsuccessful Sudanese coup, travelling as passengers, are forced to leave the plane and are subsequently executed.
  - A partial solar eclipse is visible from Asia and North America, and is the 70th and final solar eclipse of Solar Saros 116.
- July 26 – Apollo 15 (carrying astronauts David Scott, Alfred Worden and James Irwin) is launched.
- July 28 – Abdel Khaliq Mahjub, Sudanese communist leader, is hanged.
- July 29 – The United Kingdom opts out of the Space Race with the cancellation of its Black Arrow launch vehicle.
- July 30 – In Japan, an All Nippon Airways Boeing 727 collides with a Japanese fighter jet; 162 people are killed.
- July 31 – Apollo 15 astronauts David Scott and James Irwin become the first to ride in the Lunar Roving Vehicle, a day after landing on the Moon.

=== August ===
- August 1 – In New York City, 40,000 attend The Concert for Bangladesh.
- August 5
  - The South Pacific Forum (SPF) is established.
  - The McDonnell Douglas DC-10 enters service with American Airlines.
- August 6 – A total lunar eclipse lasting 1 hour, 40 minutes, and 4 seconds is observed, visible from South America, Europe, Africa, Asia and Australia, and is the 38th lunar eclipse of Lunar Saros 128.
- August 7 – Apollo 15 returns to Earth.
- August 9
  - India signs a 20-year treaty of friendship and cooperation with the Soviet Union.
  - Internment in Northern Ireland: British security forces arrest hundreds of nationalists and detain them without trial in Long Kesh prison; 20 people die in the riots that follow.
- August 10 – Mr. Tickle, the first book in the Mr. Men series is first published, in the U.K.
- August 12 – Syria severs diplomatic relations with Jordan because of border clashes.
- August 14
  - The controversial Stanford prison experiment, led by Stanford University psychology professor Philip Zimbardo, began in Palo Alto, California
  - British troops are stationed on the border between the Republic of Ireland and Northern Ireland to stop arms smuggling.
  - Bahrain declares independence as the State of Bahrain (As of 2018 officially the Kingdom of Bahrain).
- August 15
  - Jackie Stewart becomes Formula One World Drivers' Champion in the Tyrrell 003-Cosworth.
  - The number of British troops in Northern Ireland is raised to 12,500.
  - President Richard Nixon announces that the United States will no longer convert dollars to gold at a fixed value, effectively ending the Bretton Woods system. He also imposes a 90-day freeze on wages, prices and rents.
- August 15–September 5 – The 1971 Women's World Cup in Association football (an event not recognized by FIFA) is staged in Mexico: Denmark will be the winners.
- August 16 – Hastings Banda, President of Malawi, becomes the first black president to visit South Africa.
- August 18
  - Vietnam War: Australia and New Zealand decide to withdraw their troops from Vietnam.
  - The Troubles: British troops are engaged in a firefight with the IRA in Derry, Northern Ireland.
- August 19–22 – A right-wing coup ignites a rebellion in Bolivia. Miners and students join troops to support president Juan José Torres, but eventually Hugo Banzer takes over.
- August 20
  - International Telecommunications Satellite Organization (Intelsat) (effective February 12, 1973).
  - The USS Manatee spills 1,000 US gallons (3,800 L) of fuel oil on President Nixon's Western White House beach in San Clemente, California.
  - A partial solar eclipse is visible from Southern Ocean, and is the 4th solar eclipse of Solar Saros 154.
- August 21 – A bomb made of two hand grenades by alleged communist rebels (Note: Though initially to be accused as communists by President Ferdinand Marcos, some theorized that the bombings were staged by pro-Marcos affiliates, but to this day the perpetrators remain unknown.) explodes in the Liberal Party campaign party in Plaza Miranda in Quiapo, Manila the Philippines, injuring several anti-Marcos political candidates.
- August 25
  - Border clashes occur between Tanzania and Uganda.
  - Bangladesh and eastern Bengal are flooded; thousands flee the area.
- August 30 – The Progressive Conservatives under Peter Lougheed defeat the Social Credit government under Harry E. Strom in a general election, ending 36 years of uninterrupted power for Social Credit in Alberta.

=== September ===
- September 1– Operation Sourisak Montry VIII opens when forces of the Royal Thai Army recapture several positions in the territory of Laos on the south bank of the Mekong in response to an encroaching Chinese presence to the north.
- September 2 – The United Arab Republic is renamed to the Arab Republic of Egypt
- September 3
  - Qatar gains independence from the United Kingdom. Unlike most nearby emirates, Qatar declines to become part of either the United Arab Emirates or Saudi Arabia.
  - Manlio Brosio resigns as NATO Secretary General.
- September 4
  - A Boeing 727 (Alaska Airlines Flight 1866) crashes into the side of a mountain near Juneau, Alaska, killing all 111 people on board.
  - The Free State of Christiania is founded.
- September 9–13 – Attica Prison riot: A revolt breaks out at the maximum-security prison in Attica, New York. In the end, state police and the United States National Guard storm the facility; 42 are killed, 10 of them hostages.
- September 17 – Hugo L. Black retires as an Associate Justice of the Supreme Court of the United States after serving for 34 years, at this time a record for longevity; Black dies eight days later.
- September 21 – Pakistan declares a state of emergency.
- September 24 – Britain expels 90 KGB and GRU officials; 15 are not allowed to return.
- September 27–October 11 – Japanese Emperor Hirohito travels abroad.
- September 28 – Cardinal József Mindszenty, who has taken refuge in the U.S. Embassy in Budapest since 1956, is allowed to leave Hungary.
- September 29 – A cyclone in the Bay of Bengal, in the Indian state of Orissa, kills 10,000.

=== October ===
- October 1 – Walt Disney World opens in Orlando, Florida.
- October 13 – The Pittsburgh Pirates defeat the Baltimore Orioles 4–3 in Game 4 of the World Series at home in the first ever Major League Baseball postseason game played at night. The Pirates defeat the Orioles 2–1 in the decisive Game 7 at Baltimore four days later.
- October 14 – Greenpeace is founded in Vancouver, British Columbia, Canada.
- October 10 – United Arab Airlines, the flag carrier of Egypt, is renamed to EgyptAir
- October 14 – The largest state banquet in history is held at the ancient city of Persepolis in Iran, marking the symbolic Celebration of the 2,500th Anniversary of the Founding of the Persian Empire.
- October 18 – In New York City, the Knapp Commission begins public hearings on police corruption.
- October 21
  - U.S. President Richard Nixon nominates Lewis Franklin Powell Jr. and William H. Rehnquist to the U.S. Supreme Court.
  - The Clarkston explosion in Scotland, caused by a gas leak, kills 22 people.
- October 25 – The United Nations General Assembly admits the People's Republic of China and expels the Republic of China (or Taiwan).
- October 27 – The Democratic Republic of the Congo is renamed Zaire.
- October 28
  - The House of Commons of the United Kingdom votes 356–244 in favour of joining the European Economic Community.
  - The United Kingdom becomes the sixth nation successfully to launch a satellite into orbit using its own launch vehicle, the Prospero (X-3) experimental communications satellite, using a Black Arrow carrier rocket from Woomera, South Australia.
  - The Khedivial Opera House in Cairo, Egypt, burns down.
- October 29 – Vietnam War – Vietnamization: The total number of American troops still in Vietnam drops to a record low of 196,700 (the lowest since January 1966).
- October 30 – Rev. Ian Paisley founds the Democratic Unionist Party in Northern Ireland.
- October 31 – A bomb explodes at the top of the Post Office Tower in London.

=== November ===
- Erin Pizzey establishes the world's first domestic violence shelter in Chiswick, London.
- November 3 – The UNIX Programmer's Manual is published.
- November 6 – Operation Grommet: The U.S. tests a thermonuclear warhead at Amchitka Island in Alaska, code-named Project Cannikin. At around 5 megatons, it is the largest ever U.S. underground detonation.
- November 9 – A Royal Air Force C-130 crashes into the Ligurian Sea near Leghorn, Italy, killing all 51 people on board.
- November 10 – Cambodian Civil War: In Cambodia, Khmer Rouge forces attack Phnom Penh and its airport, killing 44, wounding at least 30 and damaging 9 airplanes.
- November 12 – Vietnam War – Vietnamization: U.S. President Richard M. Nixon sets February 1, 1972, as the deadline for the removal of another 45,000 American troops from Vietnam.
- November 13 – Mariner program: Mariner 9 becomes the first spacecraft to enter Mars orbit successfully.
- November 14 – Pope Shenouda III of Alexandria is enthroned.
- November 15
  - Intel releases the world's first microprocessor, the Intel 4004.
  - International Organization and System of Space Communications (Intersputnik) is founded (effective July 12, 1972).
- November 18 – Oman gains independence from the United Kingdom.
- November 20 – A bridge still under construction, called Elevado Engenheiro Freyssinet, falls over the Paulo de Frontin Avenue, in Rio de Janeiro, Brazil; 48 people are killed and several injured. Reconstructed, the bridge is a part of the Linha Vermelha elevate.
- November 22 – In Britain's worst mountaineering tragedy, the Cairngorm Plateau disaster, five children and one of their leaders are found dead from exposure in the Scottish mountains.
- November 23 – The People's Republic of China takes the Republic of China's seat on the United Nations Security Council (see China and the United Nations).
- November 24
  - During a severe storm over Washington State, a man calling himself Dan Cooper (later misreported as D. B. Cooper) parachutes from the Northwest Orient Airlines plane he had hijacked, with US$200,000 in ransom money, and is never seen again.
  - A Brussels court sentences pretender Alexis Brimeyer to 18 months in jail for falsely using a noble title; Brimeyer has already fled to Greece.
- November 30 – Iranian forces occupy the Persian Gulf islands of Abu Musa (joint occupation by agreement with Sharjah) and the Greater and Lesser Tunbs (taken by force from Ras Al Khaimah).

=== December ===
- December 1 – Cambodian Civil War: Khmer Rouge rebels intensify assaults on Cambodian government positions, forcing their retreat from Kompong Thmar and nearby Ba Ray, 10 kilometers northeast of Phnom Penh.
- December 2
  - Six of the seven Trucial States combine in an act of union to found the United Arab Emirates.
  - The Soviet Mars 3 lander reaches the surface of Mars, transmits for a few seconds and then goes silent. It is the first spacecraft to reach the planet.
- December 3 – The Indo-Pakistani War of 1971 begins with Operation Chengiz Khan as Pakistan launches preemptive attacks on nine Indian airbases. The next day India launches a massive invasion of East Pakistan.
- December 3–4 – The Pakistani submarine PNS Ghazi (former USS Diablo) sinks mysteriously near the Indian coast while laying mines.
- December 4
  - The Montreux Casino burns down during a Frank Zappa concert (the event is memorialized in the Deep Purple song "Smoke on the Water"). The casino is rebuilt in 1975.
  - The McGurk's Bar bombing by the Ulster Volunteer Force in Belfast kills 15.
- December 7 – Battle of Sylhet rages between the Pakistani military and the Indian Army.
- December 8 – U.S. President Richard Nixon orders the 7th Fleet to move towards the Bay of Bengal in the Indian Ocean.
- December 11 – Nihat Erim forms the new government of Turkey (34th government; Nihat Erim has served two times as prime minister).
- December 16 – Victory Day of Bangladesh: The Pakistan Army in East Pakistan (now Bangladesh) surrenders to the joint forces of India and the Bengali nationalist separatists, ending the Bangladesh Liberation War.
- December 18
  - The U.S. dollar is devalued for the second time in history.
  - The world's largest hydroelectric plant in Krasnoyarsk, Soviet Union, begins operations.
- December 19
  - Clube Atlético Mineiro wins the Brazil Football Championship.
  - Intelsat IV (F3) is launched; it enters commercial service over the Atlantic Ocean February 18, 1972.
- December 20 – Two groups of French doctors involved in humanitarian aid merge to form Médecins Sans Frontières.
- December 24
  - Giovanni Leone is elected President of the Italian Republic.
  - Juliane Koepcke survives a fall of 10,000 feet following disintegration of LANSA Flight 508.
- December 25 – Daeyeonggak Hotel fire: A fire at a 22-story hotel in Seoul, South Korea, kills 158 people.
- December 26
  - Former teacher Patrick Critton hijacks Air Canada Flight 932, diverting the flight from Canada to Cuba. He would remain a fugitive for almost 30 years.
  - The first reported sighting of the Nullarbor Nymph in Australia was made. The story traveled around the world until it was proven to be a hoax in 1972.
- December 29 – The United Kingdom gives up its military bases in Malta.
- December 30 – The first McDonald's in Australia opens in Yagoona, Sydney.

=== Date unknown ===
- Ray Tomlinson sends the first ARPANET e-mail between host computers, in late 1971.
- The Socialist Federal Republic of Yugoslavia bans the cultural organization Matica hrvatska (founded in 1842), soon after December 20.
- Crude oil production peaks in the continental United States at approximately 4.5 million barrels per day (720,000 m^{3}/d).

== Births ==
=== January ===
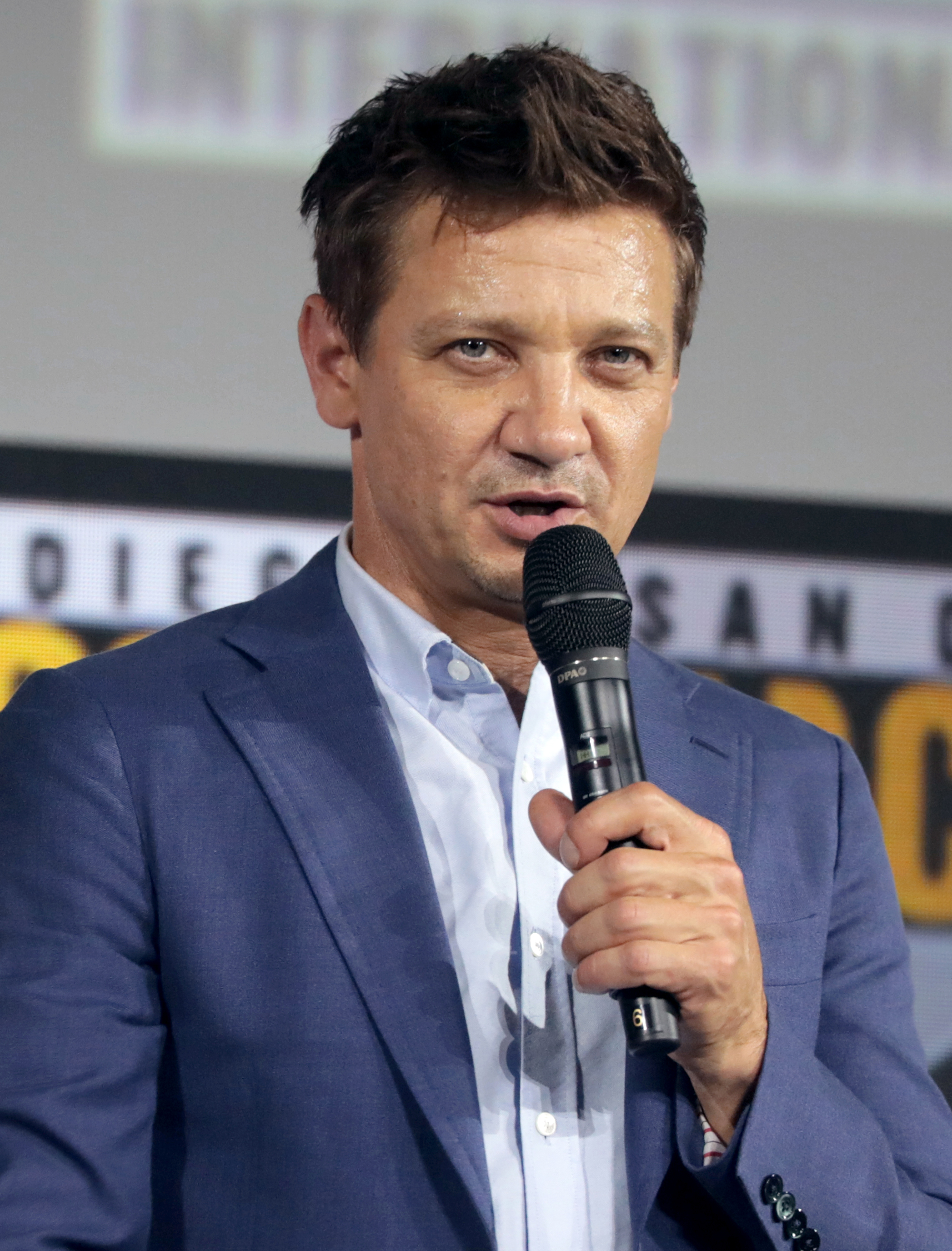
Jeremy Renner

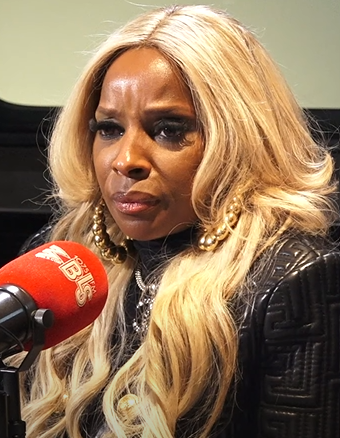
Mary J. Blige

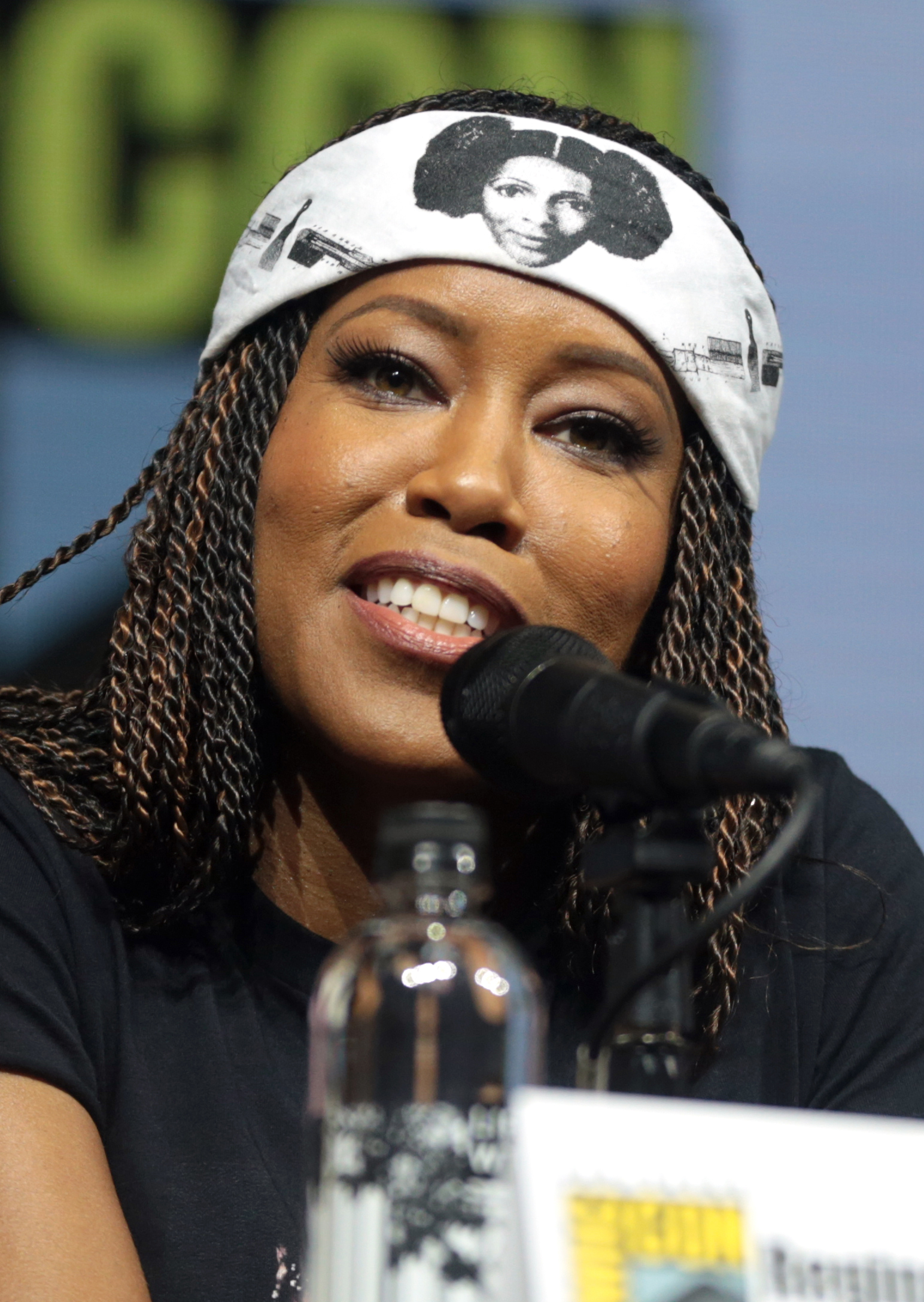
Regina King

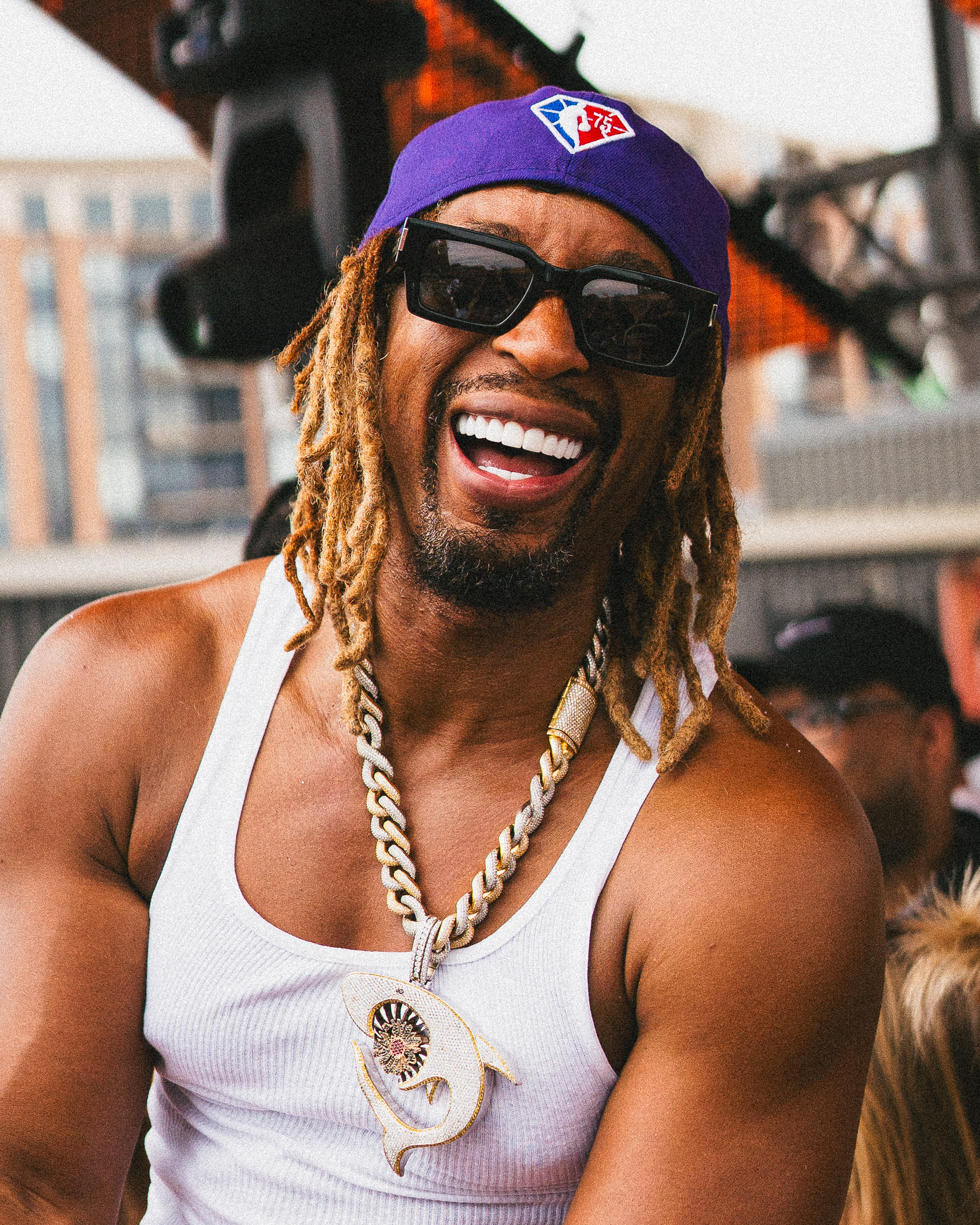
Lil Jon

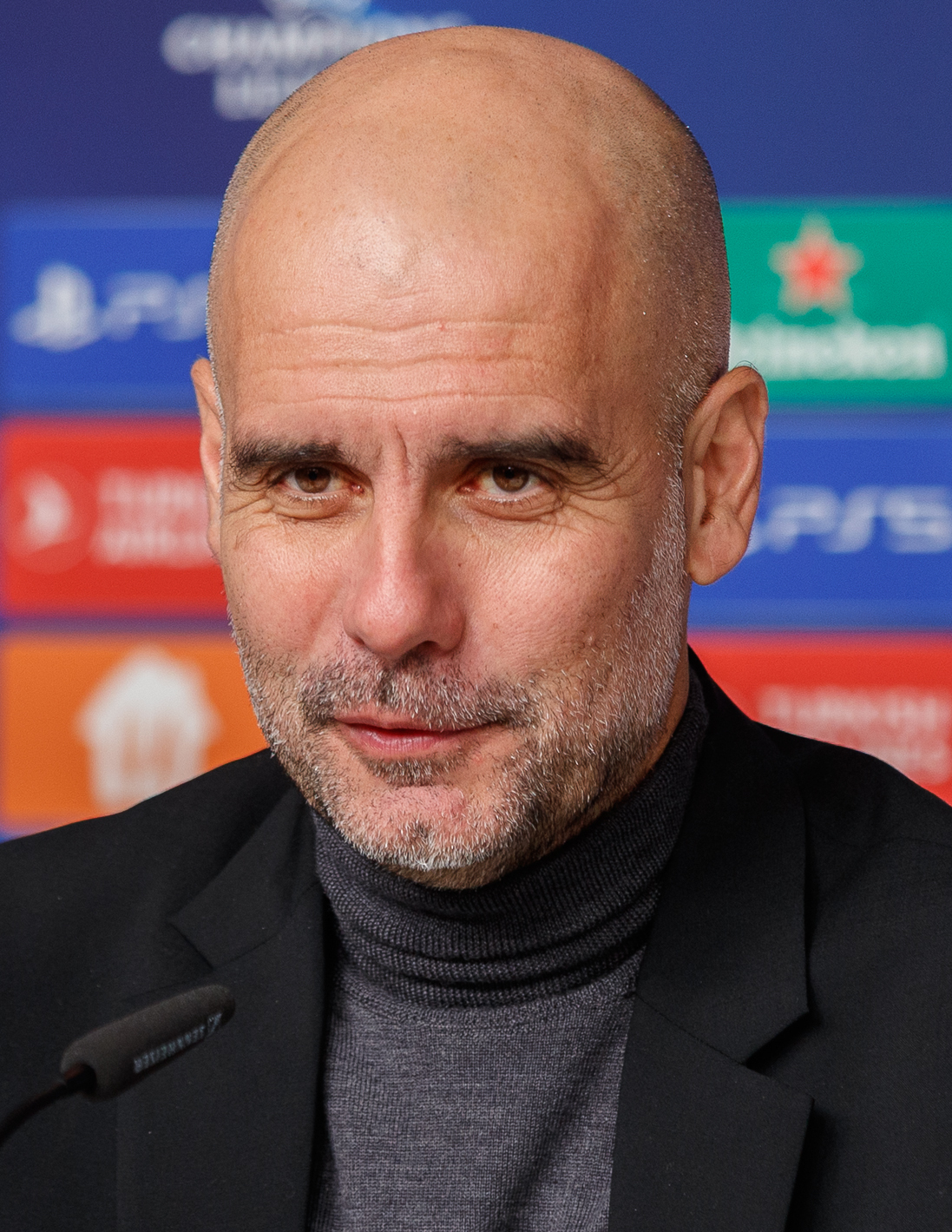
Pep Guardiola

- January 1 – Sammie Henson, American wrestler, Olympic silver medalist
- January 2
  - Taye Diggs, American actor
  - Renée Elise Goldsberry, American actress, singer and songwriter
- January 7
  - DJ Ötzi, Austrian entertainer and singer
  - Jeremy Renner, American actor, singer and producer
- January 11 – Mary J. Blige, American singer
- January 12
  - Arman Alizad, Iranian-born Finnish tailor and television presenter
  - Peter Madsen, Danish entrepreneur, engineer, and convicted murderer
- January 14 – Lasse Kjus, Norwegian alpine skier
- January 15 – Regina King, American actress
- January 16 – Sergi Bruguera, Spanish tennis player
- January 17
  - Lil Jon, American rapper
  - Kid Rock, American rock singer
  - Richard Burns, English rally driver (d. 2005)
- January 18
  - Pep Guardiola, Spanish football player and manager of Manchester City F.C.
  - Binyavanga Wainaina, Kenyan writer (d. 2019)
- January 19 – Shawn Wayans, American actor
- January 20 – Gary Barlow, British singer-songwriter
- January 23 – Julie Foudy, American soccer player and commentator
- January 27
  - Sudantha Dias, Sri Lankan former cricketer
  - Fann Wong, Singaporean actress and singer
- January 31 – Patricia Velásquez, Venezuelan actress and model

=== February ===
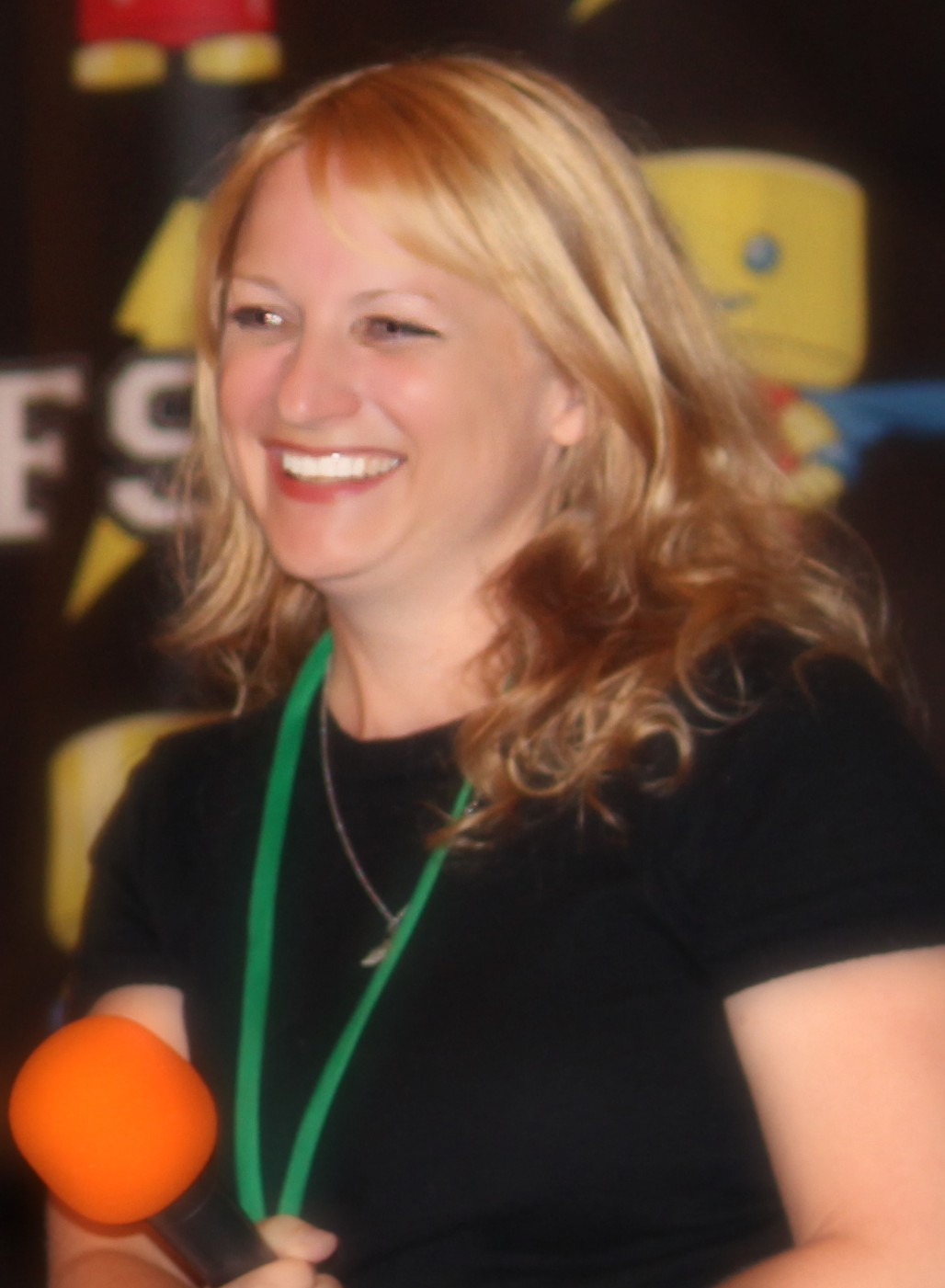
Hynden Walch

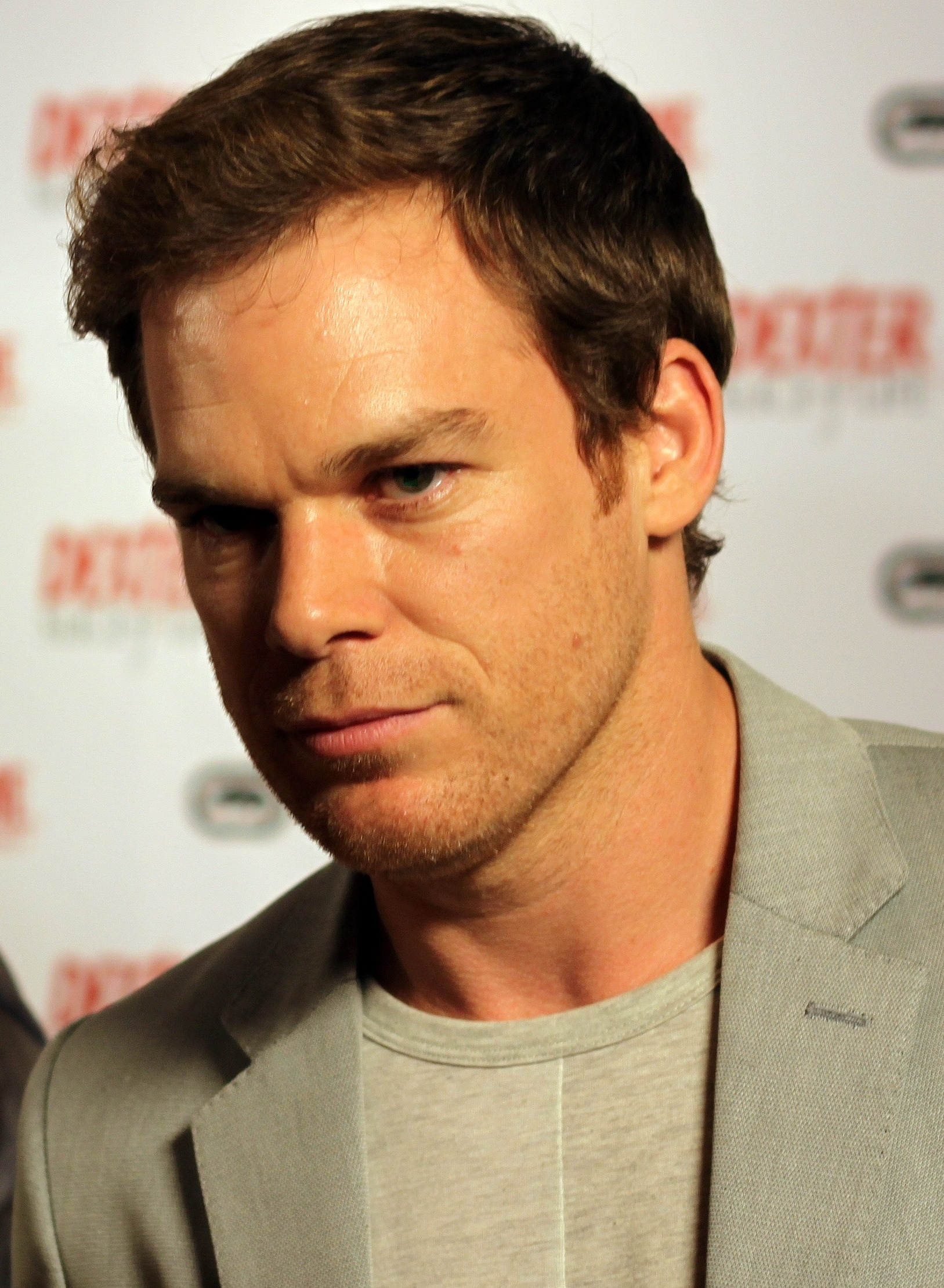
Michael C. Hall

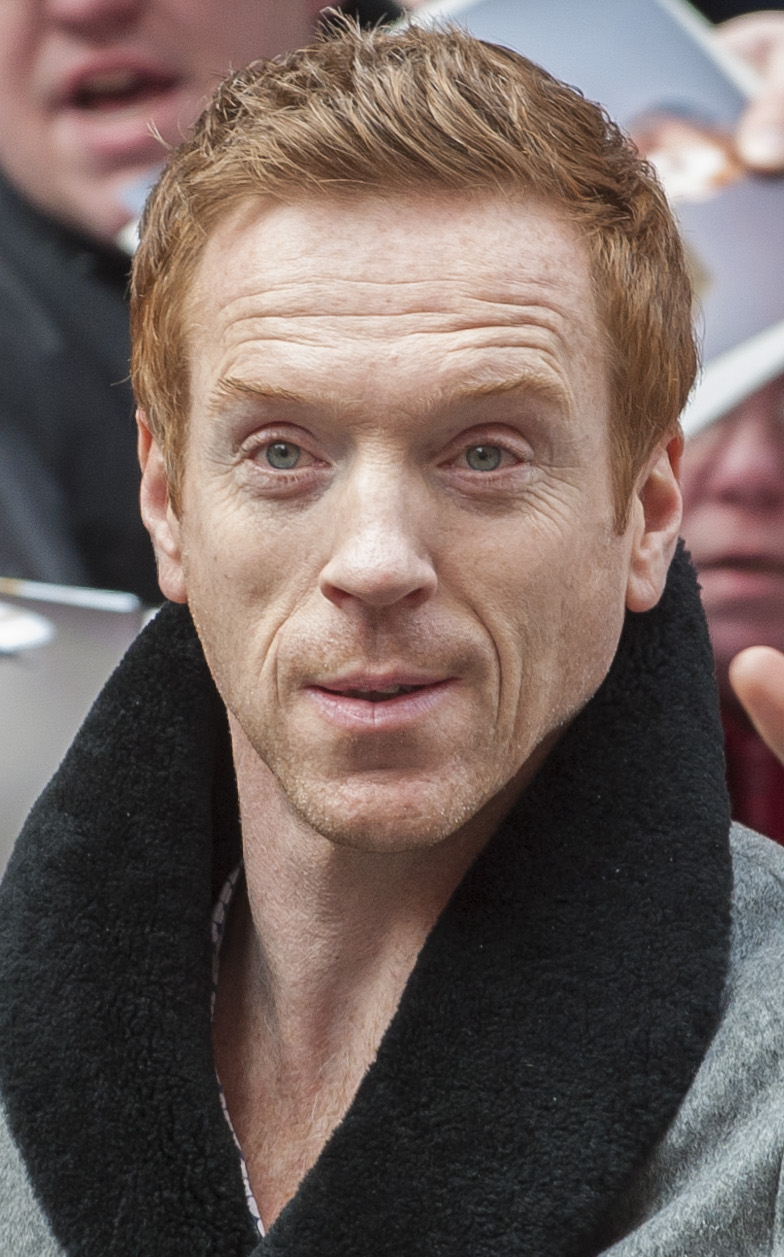
Damian Lewis

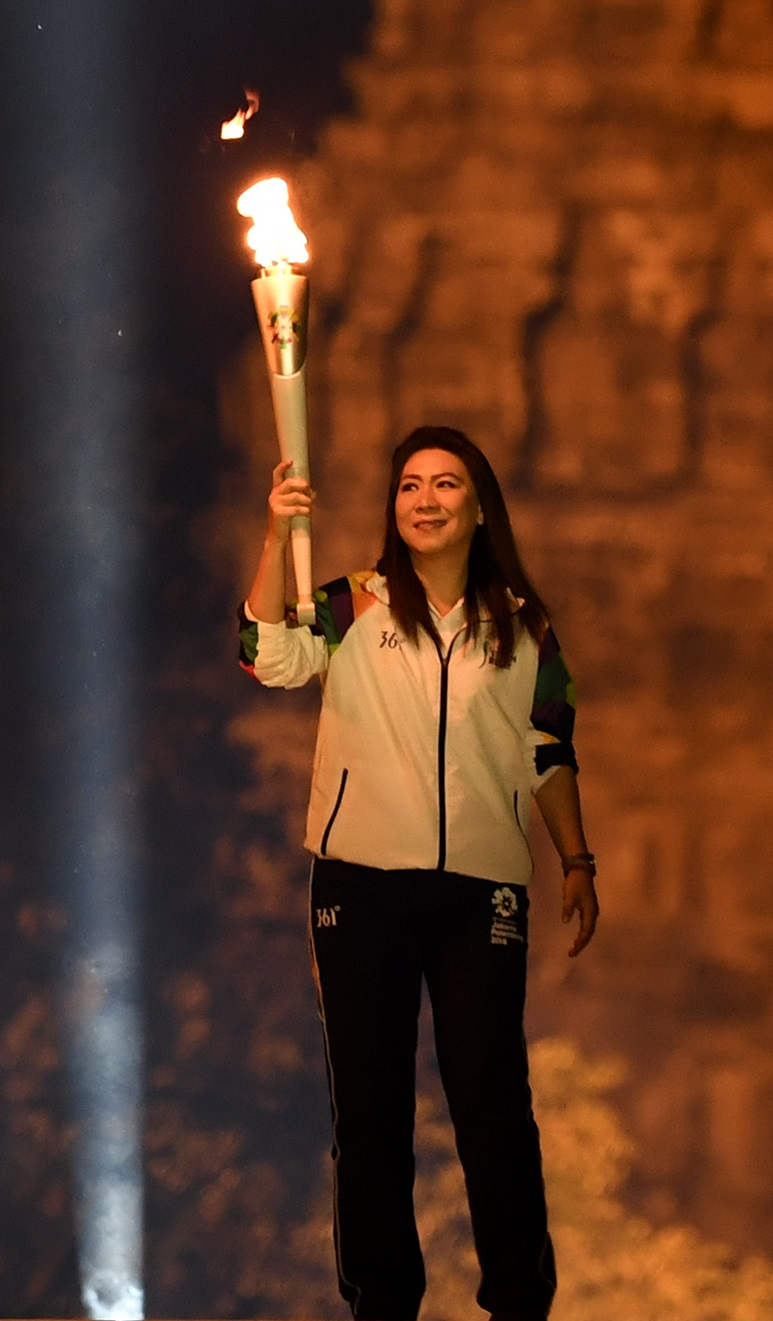
Susi Susanti

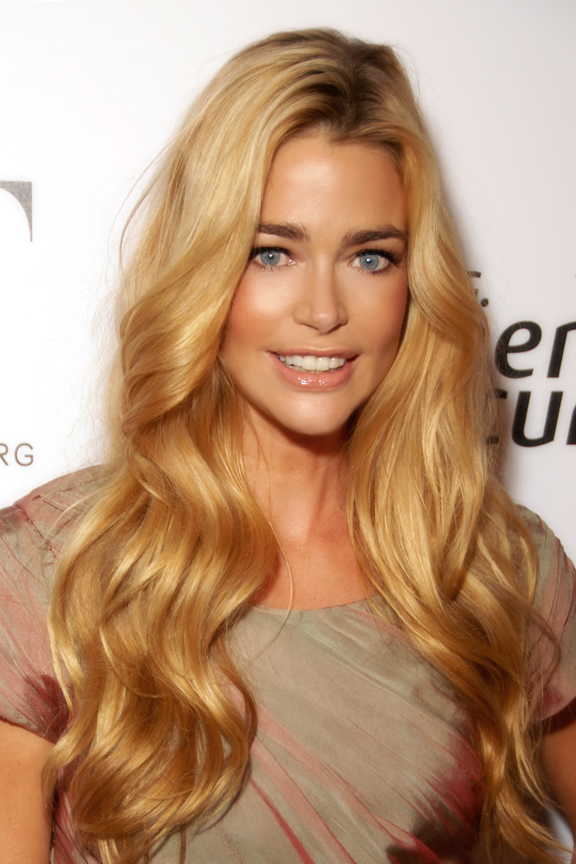
Denise Richards

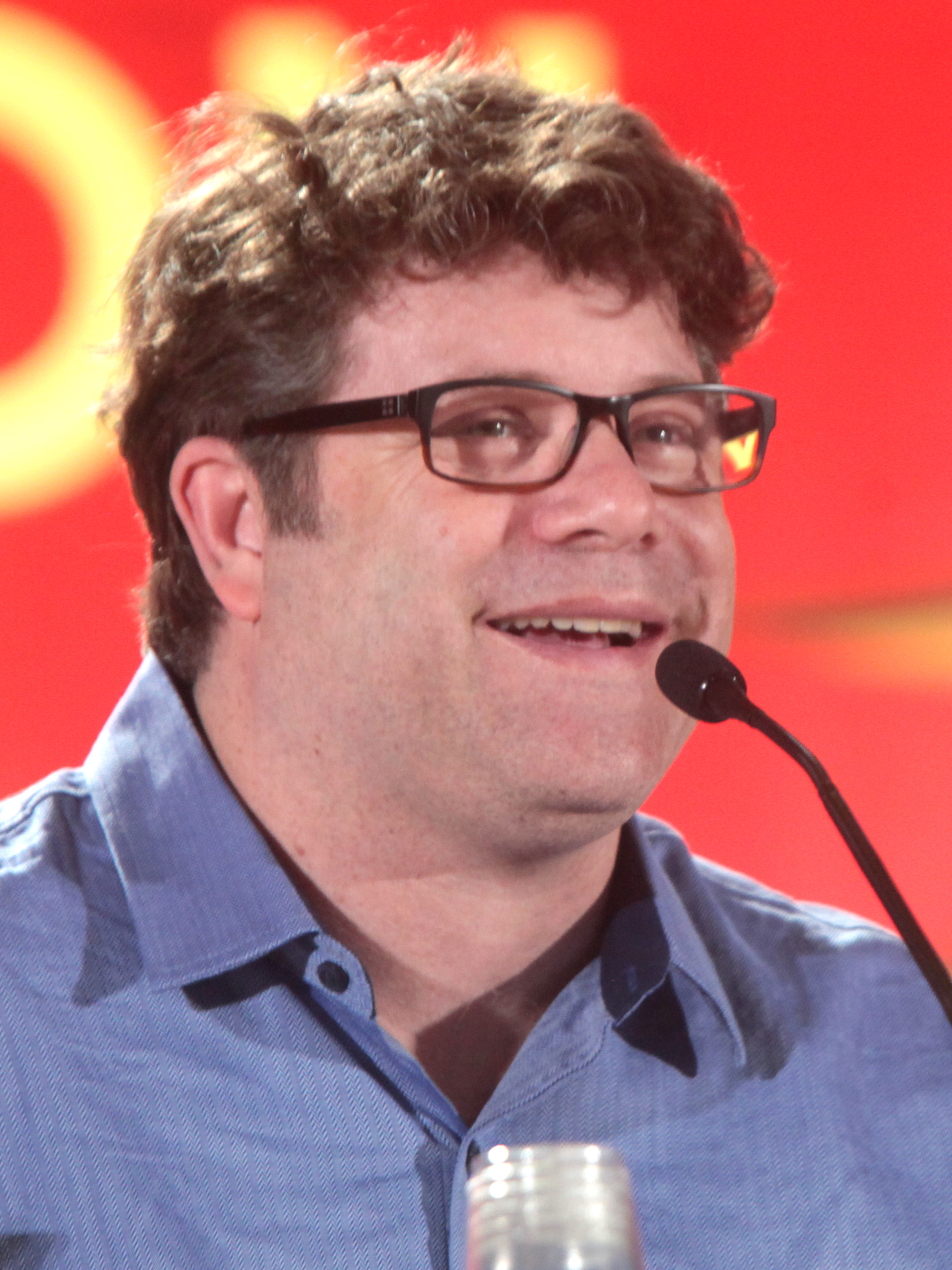
Sean Astin

- February 1
  - Michael C. Hall, American actor
  - Adriana Lessa, Brazilian actress
  - Zlatko Zahovič, Slovenian footballer
  - Hynden Walch, American voice actress
- February 3 – Sarah Kane, English playwright (d. 1999)
- February 4
  - Fatmir Limaj, Albanian politician
  - Rob Corddry, American actor and comedian
- February 5 – Sara Evans, American country music singer
- February 8 – Andrus Veerpalu, Estonian cross-country skier
- February 10
  - Lorena Rojas, Mexican actress (d. 2015)
  - Lisa Marie Varon, American professional wrestler
- February 11
  - Damian Lewis, English actor and producer
  - Susi Susanti, Indonesian badminton player
- February 13 – Mats Sundin, Swedish ice hockey player
- February 14
  - Kris Aquino, Filipina actress
  - Tommy Dreamer, American professional wrestler
  - Viscera, American professional wrestler (d. 2014)
  - Noriko Sakai, Japanese singer and actress
- February 15
  - Alex Borstein, American actress, voice artist, producer and screenwriter
  - Renee O'Connor, American actress
- February 16
  - Jack Rose, American guitarist (d. 2009)
  - Amanda Holden, British actress
- February 17 – Denise Richards, American actress
- February 18 – Thomas Bjørn, Danish golfer
  - Hiep Thi Le, Vietnamese-American actress and restaurateur (d. 2017)
- February 19
  - Gil Shaham, Israeli/American violinist
  - Jeff Kinney, American author
- February 20
  - Calpernia Addams, American actress
  - Jari Litmanen, Finnish footballer
  - Joost van der Westhuizen, South African rugby football player (d. 2017)
- February 22
  - Lisa Fernandez, American softball player
  - Lea Salonga, Filipino singer and actress
- February 23 – Angela Alsobrooks, US Senator
- February 24
  - Pedro de la Rosa, Spanish Formula One driver
  - Gillian Flynn, American author, comic book writer, and screenwriter
- February 25
  - Sean Astin, American actor, voice actor, director, and producer
  - Nova Peris, Australian athlete and politician
  - Daniel Powter, Canadian rock musician
- February 26
  - Erykah Badu, American singer-songwriter and record producer
  - Max Martin, Swedish music producer and songwriter
- February 27
  - David Rikl, Czech tennis player
  - Rozonda Thomas, African-American singer

=== March ===
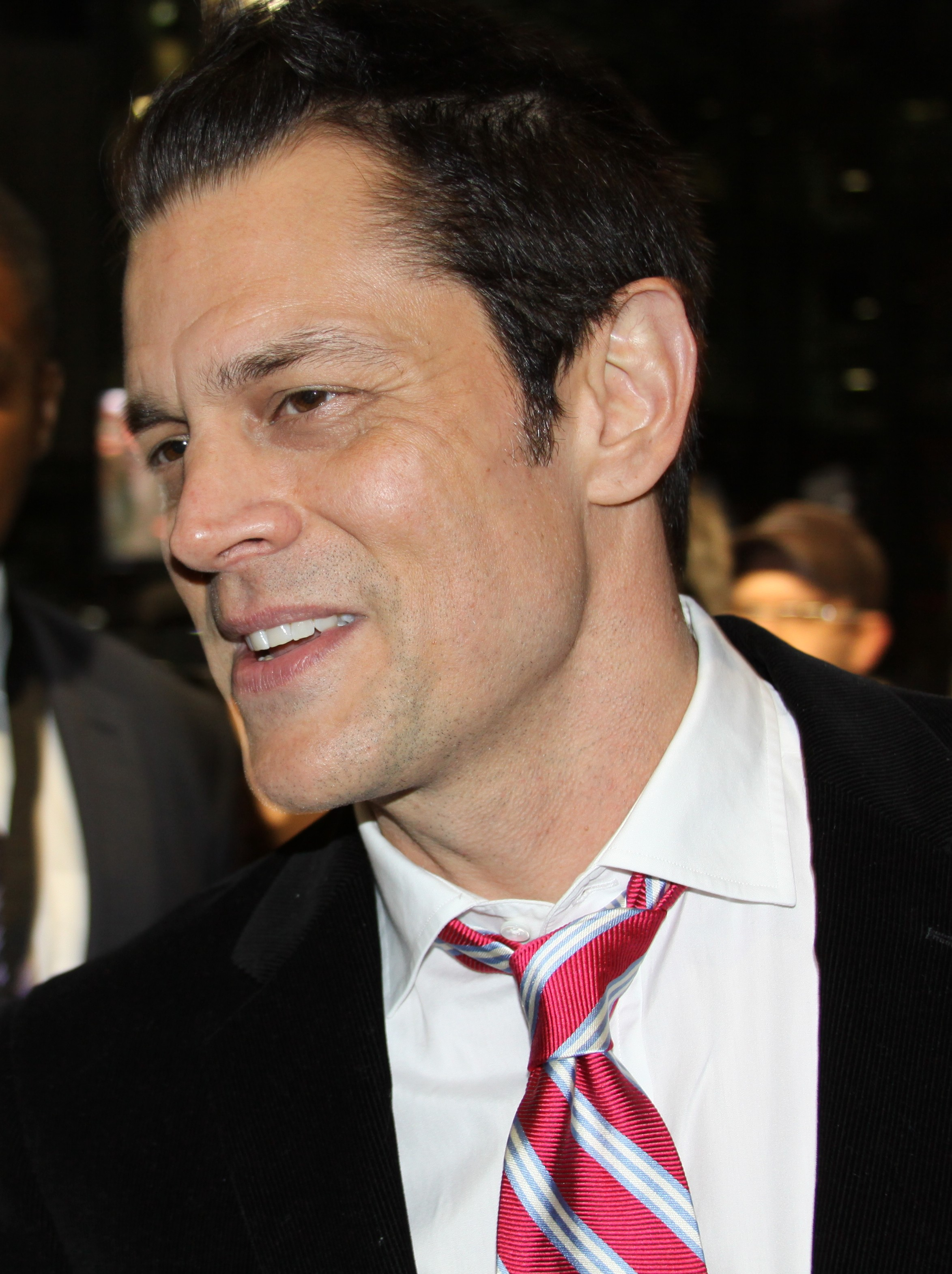
Johnny Knoxville

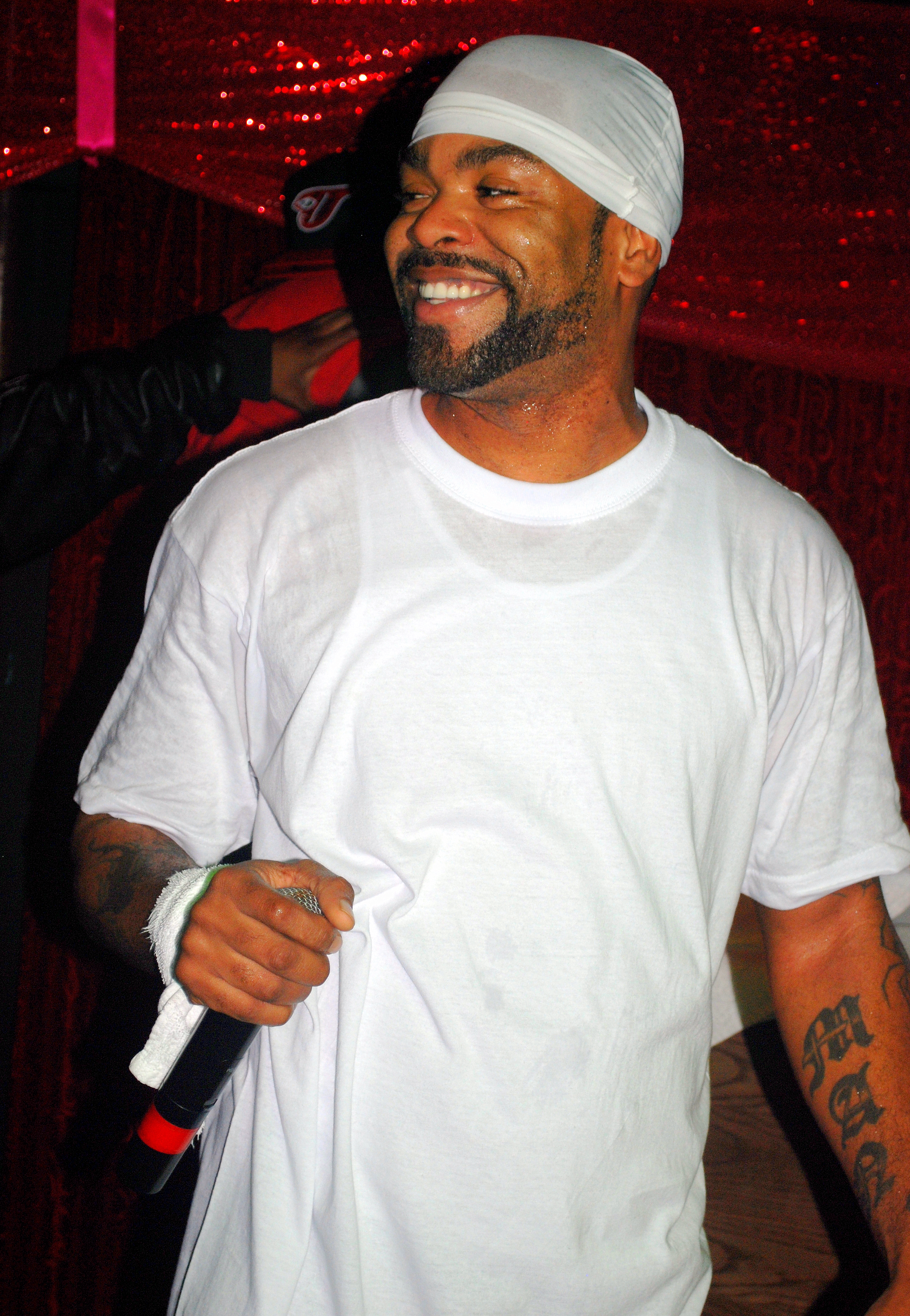
Method Man

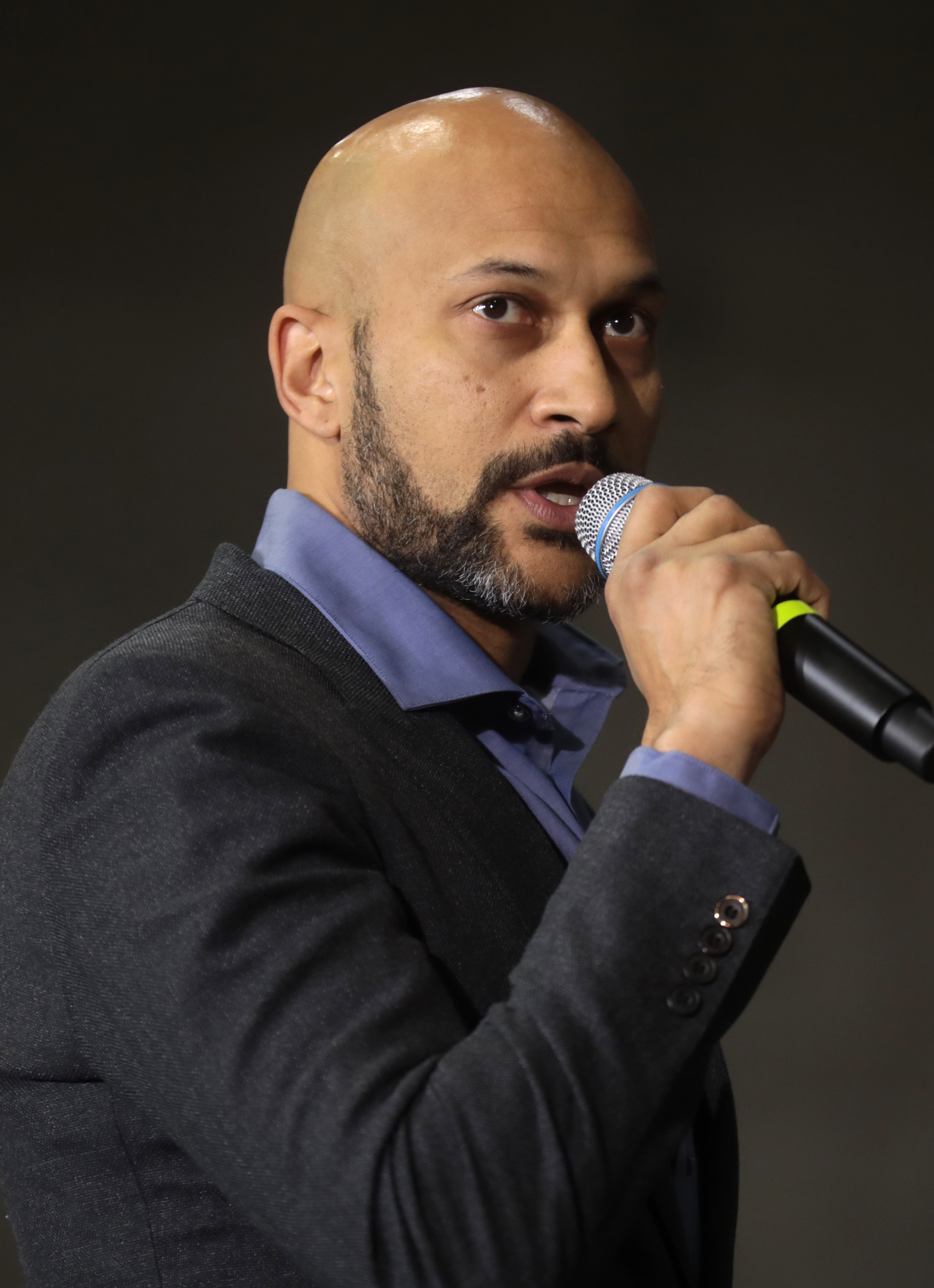
Keegan-Michael Key

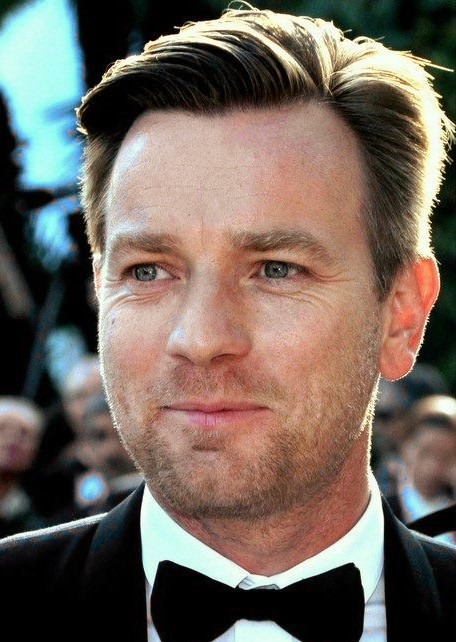
Ewan McGregor

- March 1
  - Allen Johnson, American Olympic athlete
  - Ma Dong-seok, Korean American actor
- March 2
  - Method Man, American rapper, record producer, and actor
  - Karel Rada, Czech footballer
- March 4 – Jovan Stanković, Serbian footballer
- March 5 – Yuri Lowenthal, American actor, producer and screenwriter
- March 6 – Val Venis, Canadian professional wrestler
- March 7
  - Tal Banin, Israeli footballer and manager
  - Peter Sarsgaard, American actor
  - Deshabandu Tennakoon, Sri Lankan police officer and the 36th Inspector General of Police
- March 9 – Diego Torres, Argentine singer
- March 10 – Jon Hamm, American actor, director and producer
- March 11 – Johnny Knoxville, American actor, comedian, and stunt performer
- March 16 – Alan Tudyk, American actor
- March 19 – Jose Melencio Nartatez, 32nd Chief of the Philippine National Police
- March 22 – Karen McDougal, American model and actress
  - Iben Hjejle, Danish actress
  - Keegan-Michael Key, American actor, writer, and comedian
- March 24 – Victoria Prentis, British politician
- March 26 – Rennae Stubbs, Australian tennis player
- March 27
  - David Coulthard, Scottish racing driver
  - Nathan Fillion, Canadian actor
- March 29 – Villem Lüüs, Estonian draughts player and World Draughts Federation master (d. 2020)
- March 30 – Mark Consuelos, American actor
- March 31
  - Pavel Bure, Russian ice hockey player
  - Craig McCracken, American animator
  - Ewan McGregor, Scottish actor

=== April ===
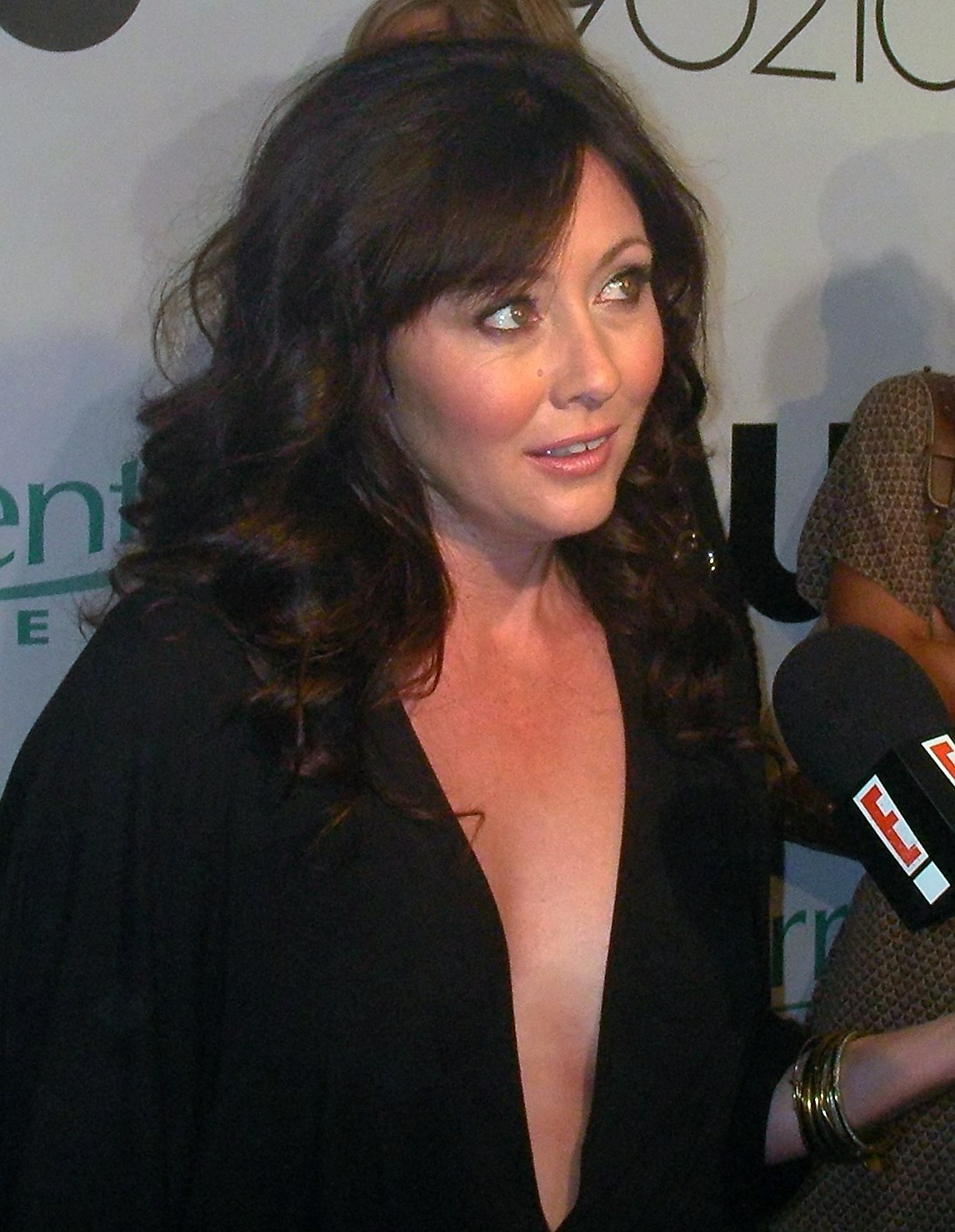
Shannen Doherty

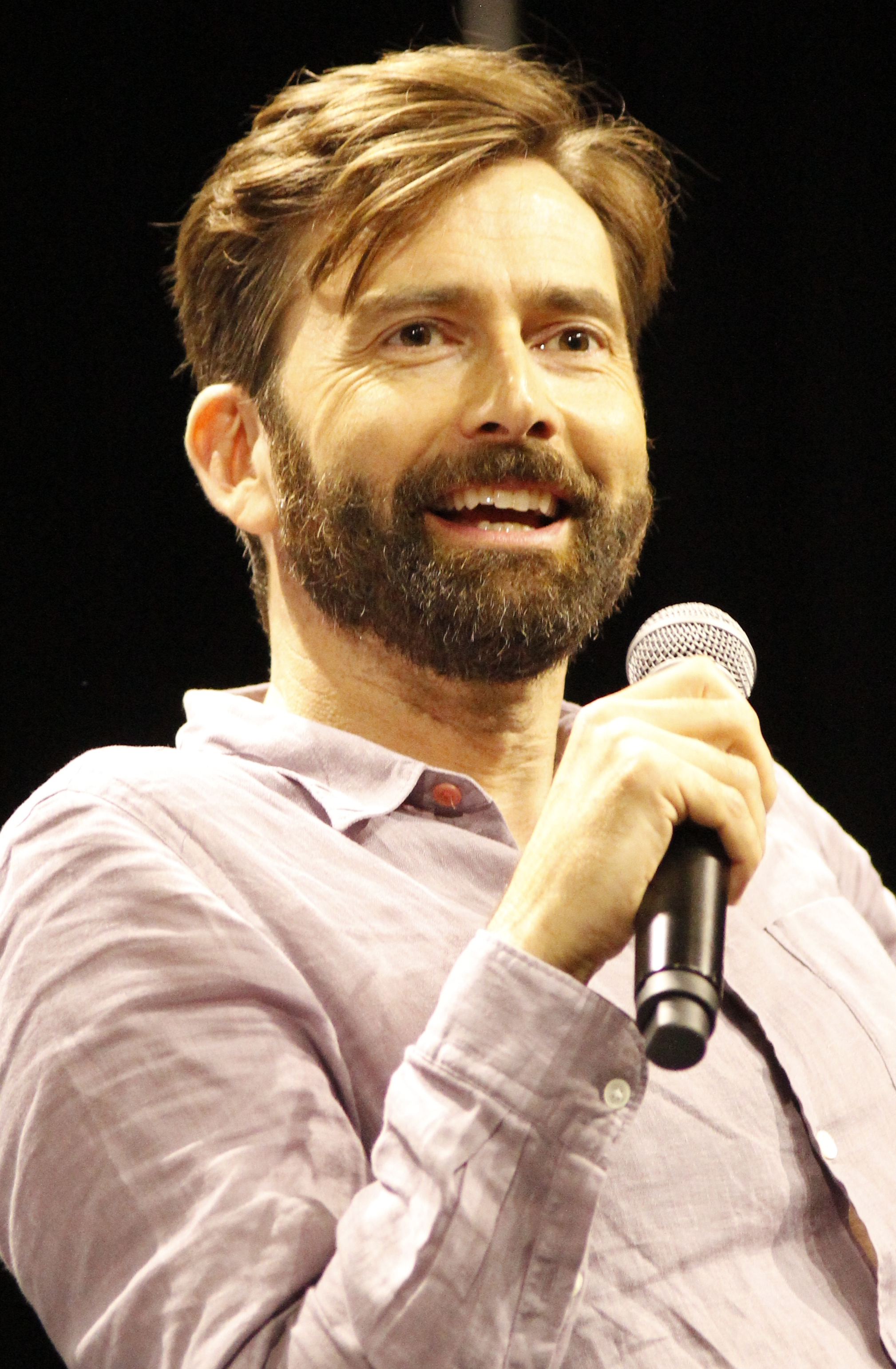
David Tennant

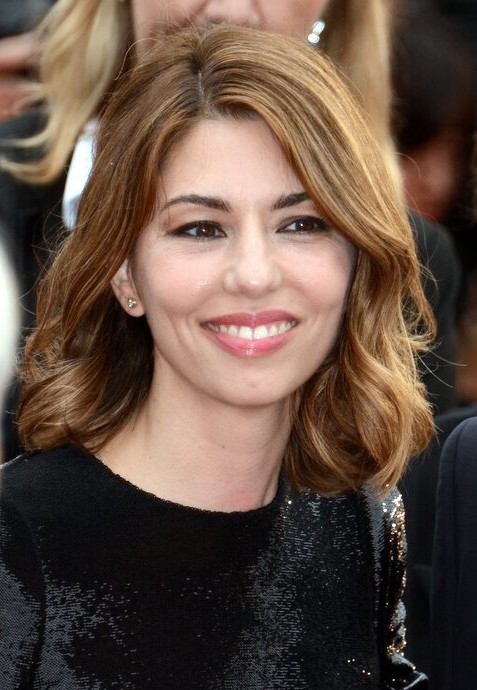
Sofia Coppola

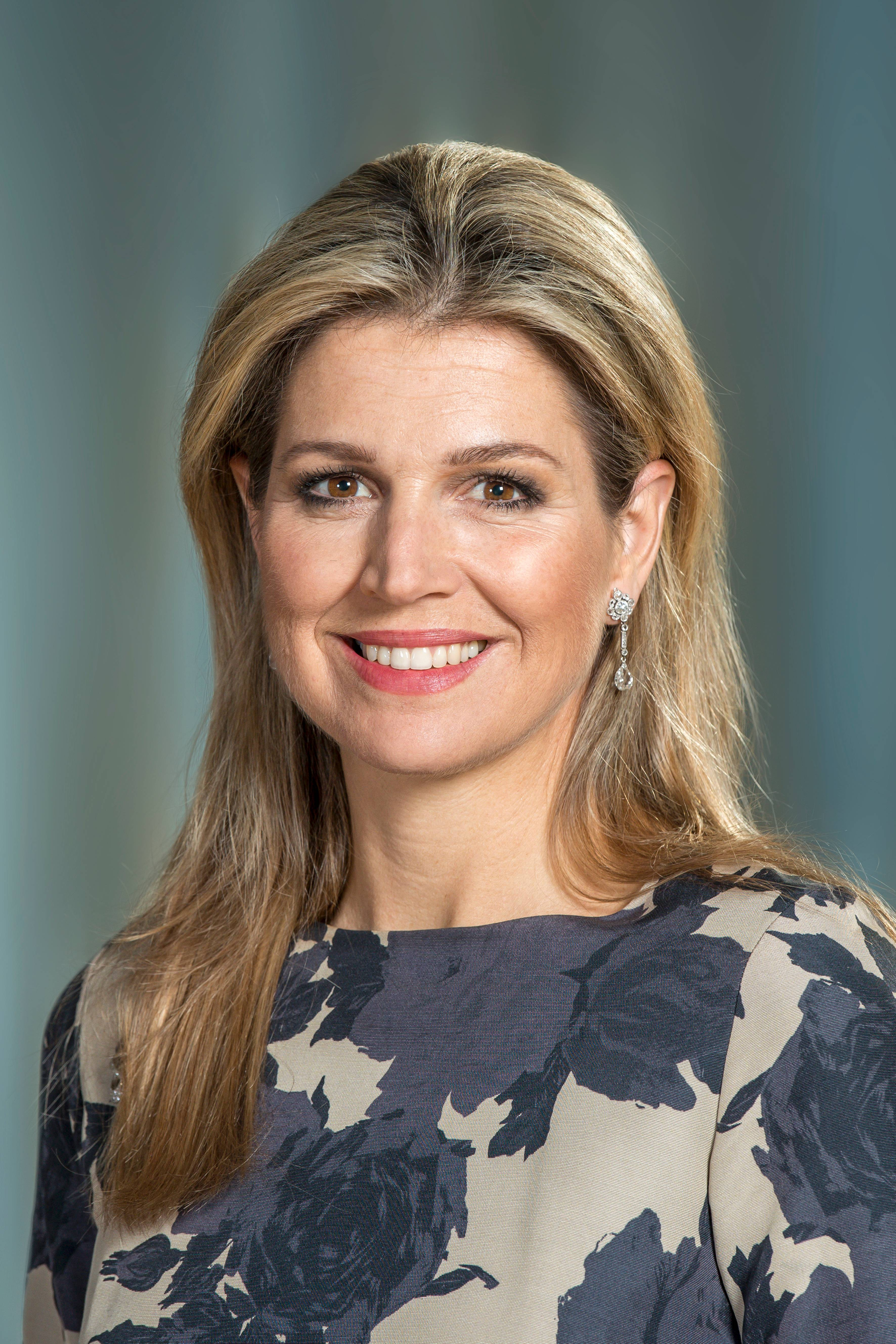
Queen Máxima of the Netherlands

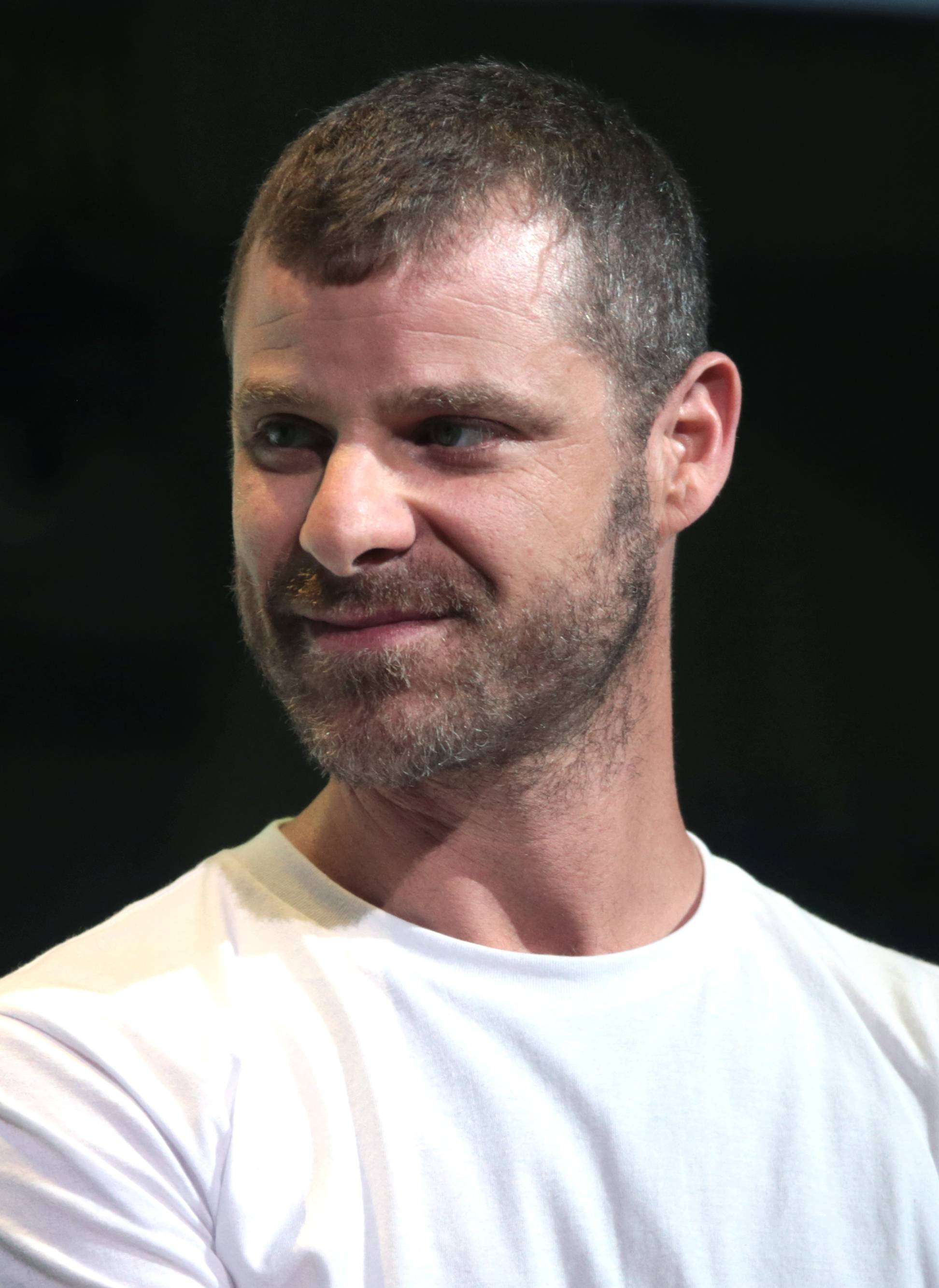
Matt Stone

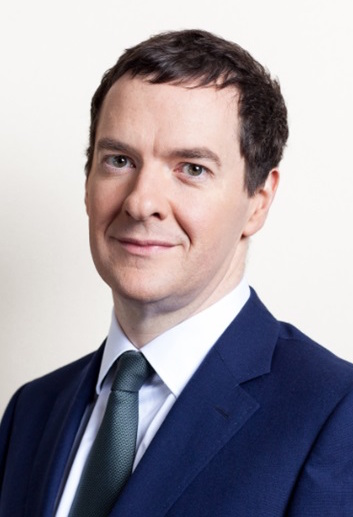
George Osborne

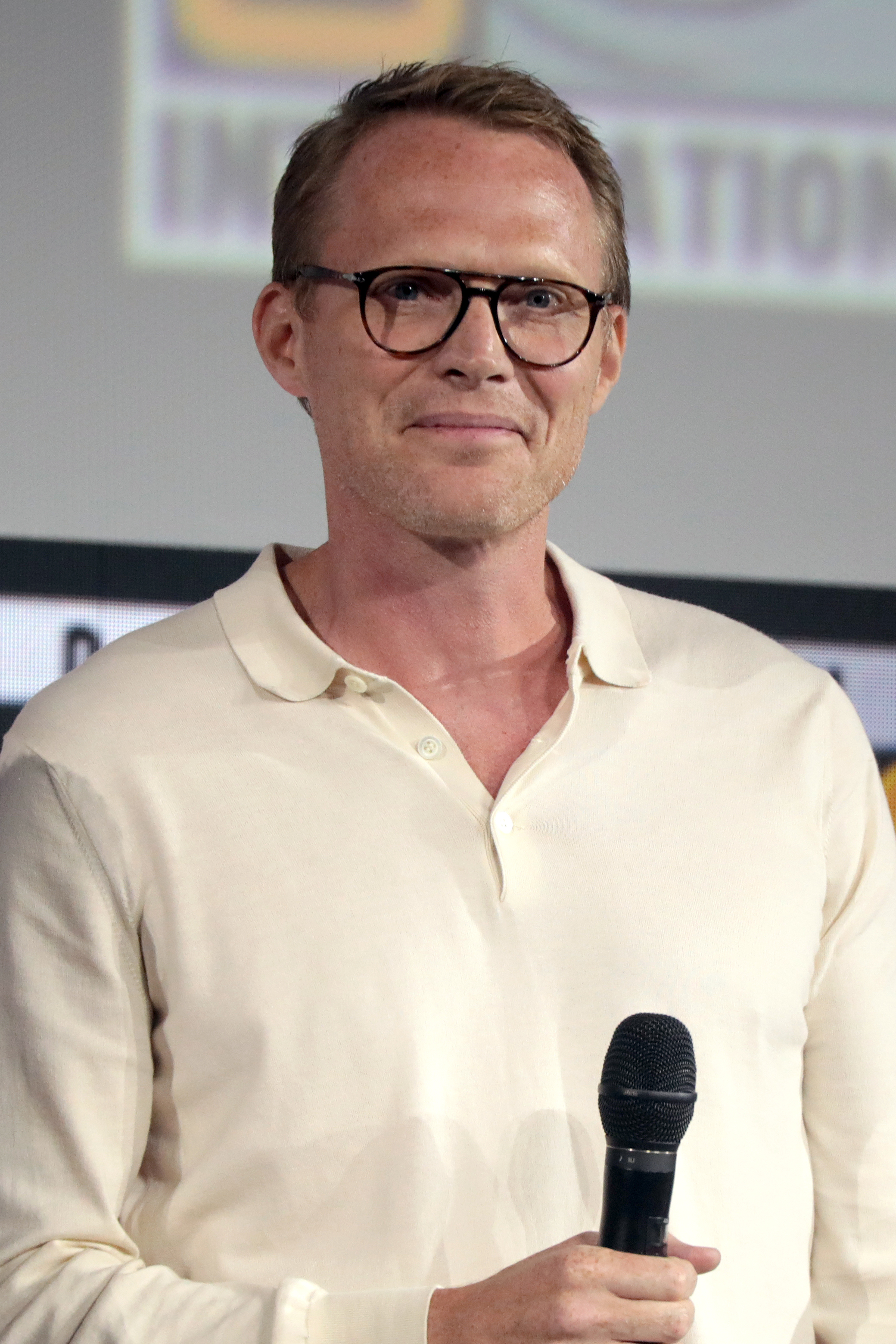
Paul Bettany

- April 1
  - Jessica Collins, American actress
  - Daniel Vacek, Czech tennis player
- April 2
  - Francisco Arce, Paraguayan footballer
  - Todd Woodbridge, Australian tennis player
- April 3
  - Shireen Abu Akleh, Palestinian/American journalist (d. 2022)
- April 5 – Haifa El Aissami, Venezuelan lawyer
  - Picabo Street, American skier
- April 7 – Guillaume Depardieu, French actor (d. 2008)
- April 8 – Kim Byung-ji, South Korean goalkeeper
- April 9 – Jacques Villeneuve, Canadian 1997 Formula 1 world champion, 1995 Indy 500 and series champion.
- April 10 – Nana Smith, American born-Japanese tennis player
- April 11
  - Oliver Riedel, German musician (Rammstein)
  - Scott Dianda, American politician and former member of the Michigan House of Representatives from 2013 to 2019
- April 12
  - Shannen Doherty, American actress (d. 2024)
  - Eyal Golan, Israeli singer
- April 14 – Miguel Calero, Colombian footballer (d. 2012)
- April 16
  - Moses Chan, Hong Kong actor
  - Selena, American singer (d. 1995)
  - Natasha Zvereva, Belarusian tennis player
- April 17 – José Francisco Cevallos, Ecuadorian footballer
- April 18 – David Tennant, Scottish actor
- April 20 – Carla Geurts, Dutch swimmer
- April 23 – D.B. Weiss, American television producer and writer, and novelist
- April 24 – Alejandro Fernández, Mexican singer
- April 28
  - Markus Beyer, German Olympic boxer (d. 2018)
  - Bridget Moynahan, American actress
- April 29
  - Leonid Kudayev, former Russian professional football player
  - Darby Stanchfield, American actress
- April 30 – John Boyne, Irish novelist

=== May ===
- May 1 – Ajith Kumar, Indian film actor
- May 6 – Yolanda Díaz, Spanish politician and lawyer
- May 10 – Kim Jong-nam, eldest son of North Korean leader Kim Jong-il (d. 2017)
- May 14 – Sofia Coppola, American filmmaker
- May 17 – Queen Máxima of the Netherlands
- May 18 – Brad Friedel, American soccer player
- May 20 – Tony Stewart, American stock car racing driver and team owner
- May 21 – Aditya Chopra, Indian film director, producer and distributor
- May 23 – George Osborne, British politician
- May 25 – Kristina Orbakaitė, Lithuanian-Russian singer and actress
- May 26 – Matt Stone, American actor, animator, writer, producer, and composer
- May 27
  - Paul Bettany, British actor
  - Lisa Lopes, African-American rapper (TLC) (d. 2002)
- May 28
  - Ekaterina Gordeeva, Russian Ice dancer
  - Marco Rubio, American politician
- May 30
  - Idina Menzel, American singer, songwriter and actress
  - John Ross Bowie, American actor and comedian

=== June ===
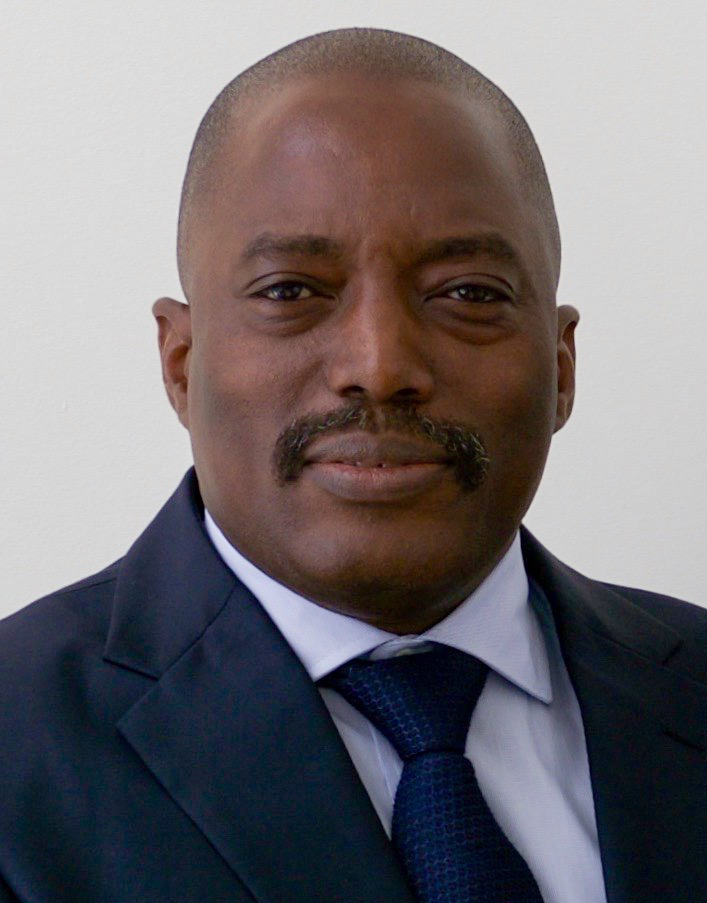
Joseph Kabila

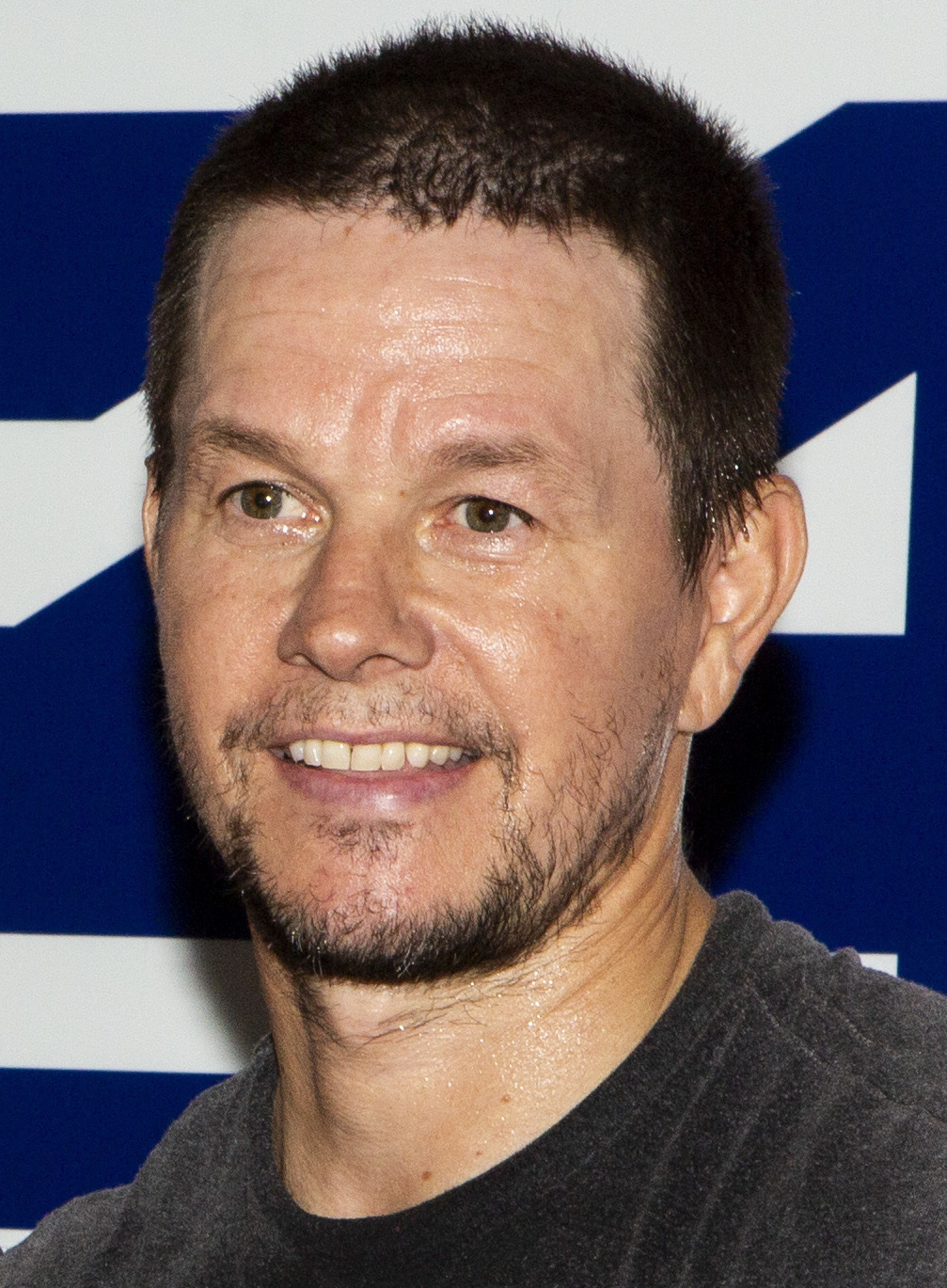
Mark Wahlberg

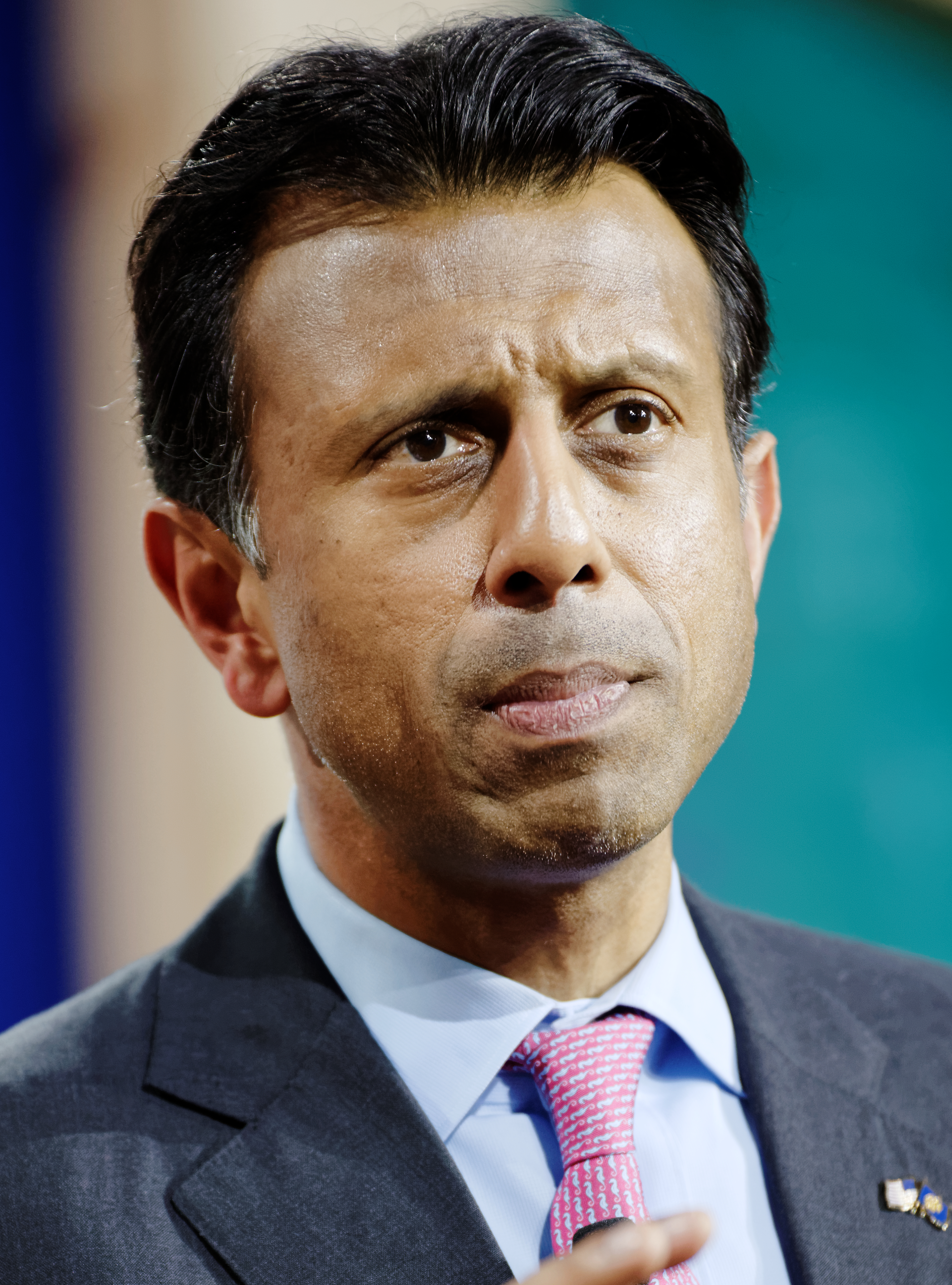
Bobby Jindal

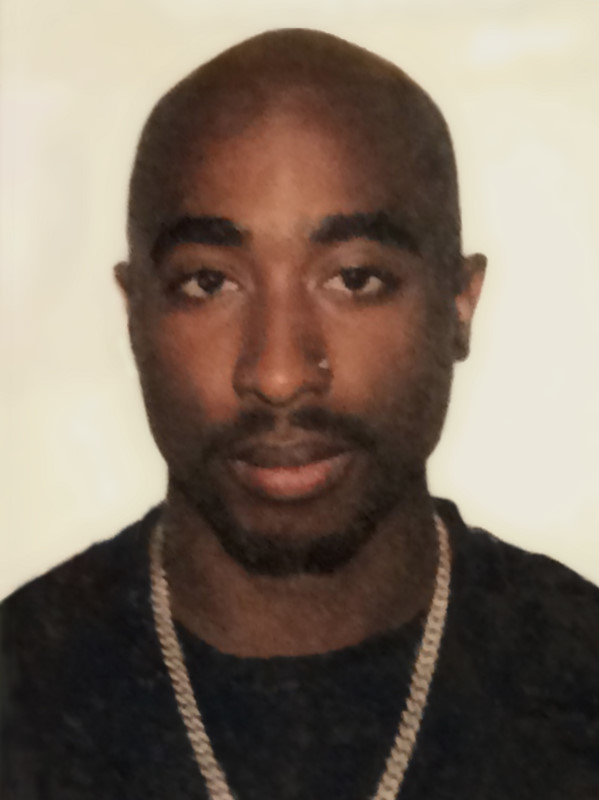
Tupac Shakur

Elon Musk

- June 1 – Mario Cimarro, Cuban actor and singer
- June 3 – Luigi Di Biagio, Italian footballer
- June 4
  - Joseph Kabila, 4th President of the Democratic Republic of the Congo
  - Noah Wyle, American actor
- June 5
  - Susan Lynch, Northern Irish actress
  - Mark Wahlberg, American actor, producer, businessman, model and rapper
- June 10
  - Bobby Jindal, American politician
  - Soraya Sáenz de Santamaría, Deputy Prime Minister of Spain
- June 12 – Mark Henry, American professional wrestler, Olympian
- June 16 – Tupac Shakur, African-American rapper and actor (d. 1996)
- June 17 – Paulina Rubio, Mexican singer
- June 18 – Jen Kiggans, American politician and nurse
- June 21 – Anette Olzon, Swedish singer (Nightwish, Alyson Avenue)
- June 22 – Kurt Warner, American football player
- June 24
  - Thomas Helveg, Danish footballer
  - Ji Jin-hee, South Korean actor
- June 25
  - Angela Kinsey, American actress
  - Neil Lennon, Northern Irish footballer and manager
- June 26 – Max Biaggi, Italian motorcycle racer
- June 27
  - King Dipendra of Nepal (d. 2001)
  - Serginho, Brazilian footballer
- June 28
  - Fabien Barthez, French racing driver and football player
  - Kenny Cunningham, Irish football player
  - Elon Musk, South African-born, American entrepreneur and investor
  - Aileen Quinn, American actress
- June 29 – Nawal El Zoghbi, Lebanese singer
- June 30 – Monica Potter, American actress

=== July ===
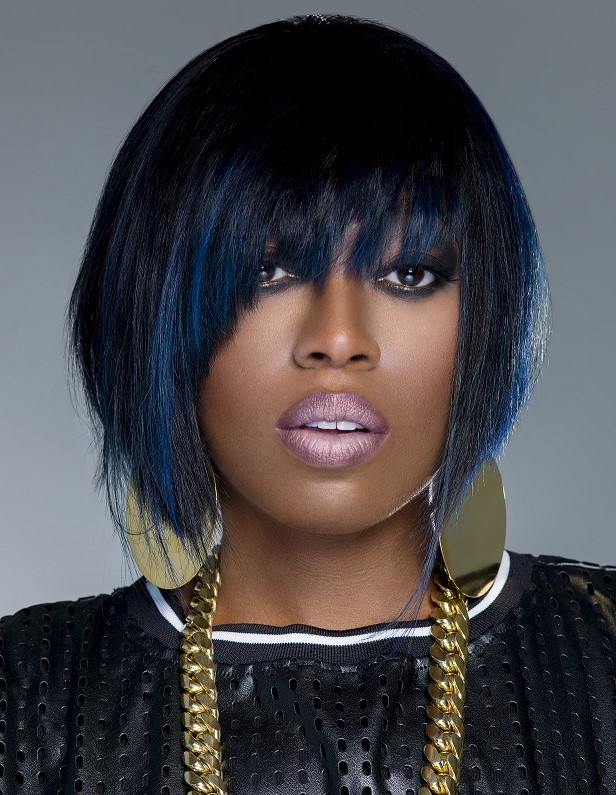
Missy Elliott

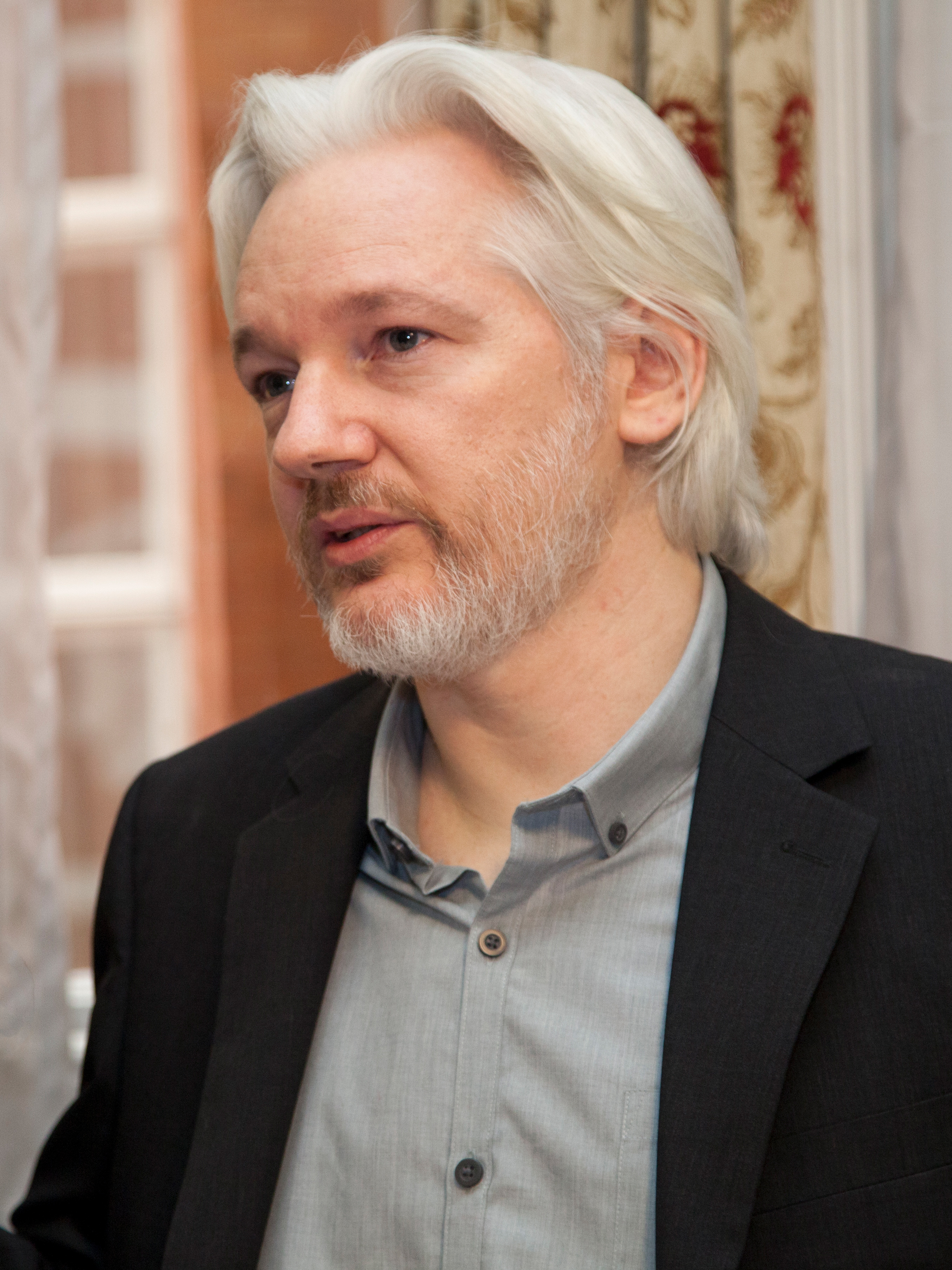
Julian Assange

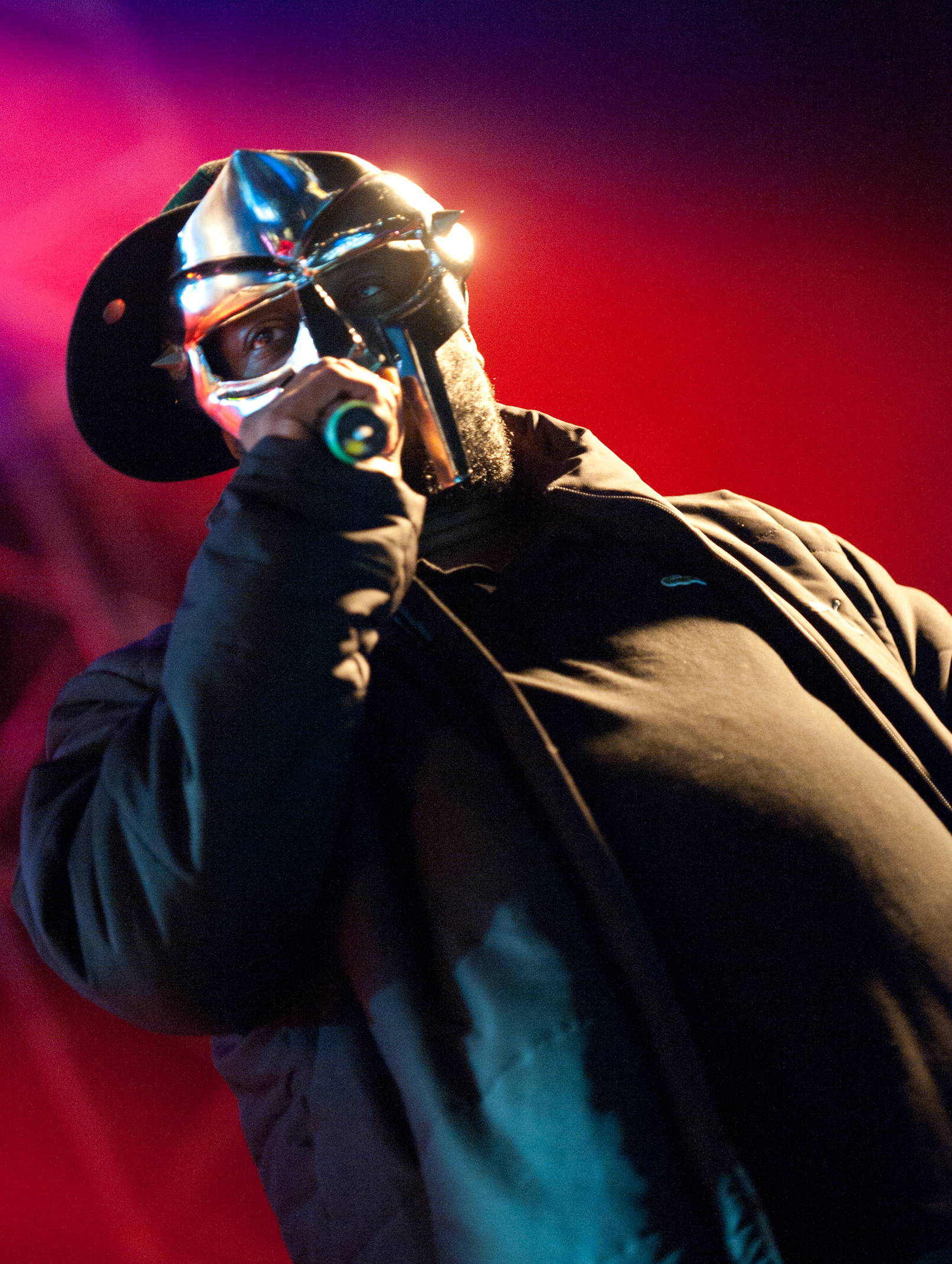
MF Doom

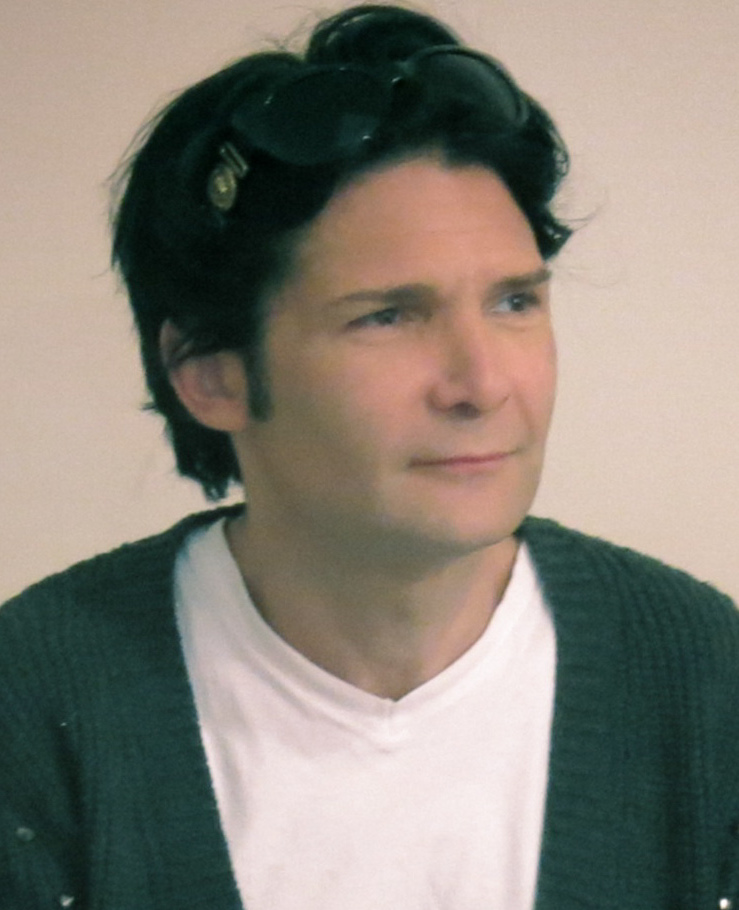
Corey Feldman

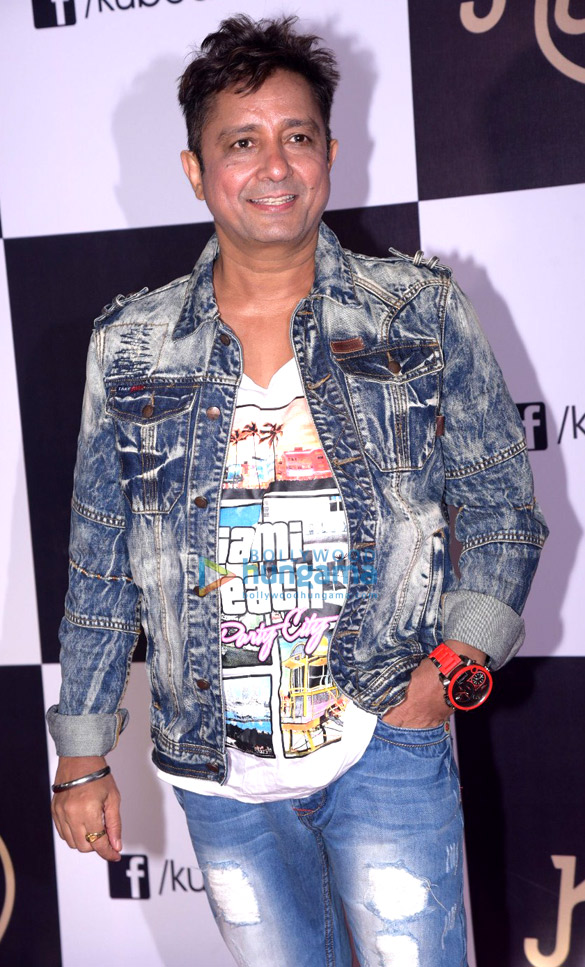
Sukhwinder Singh

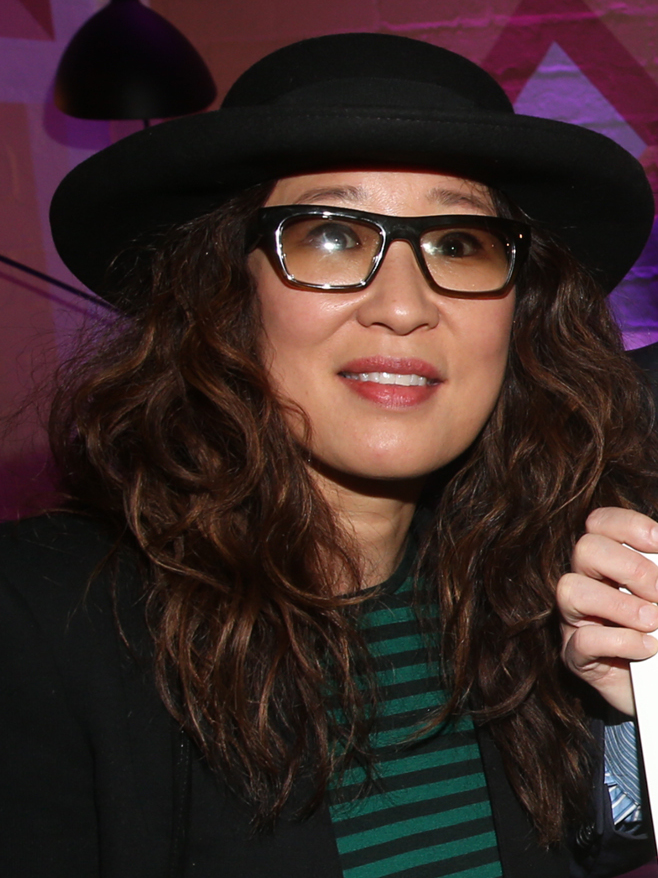
Sandra Oh

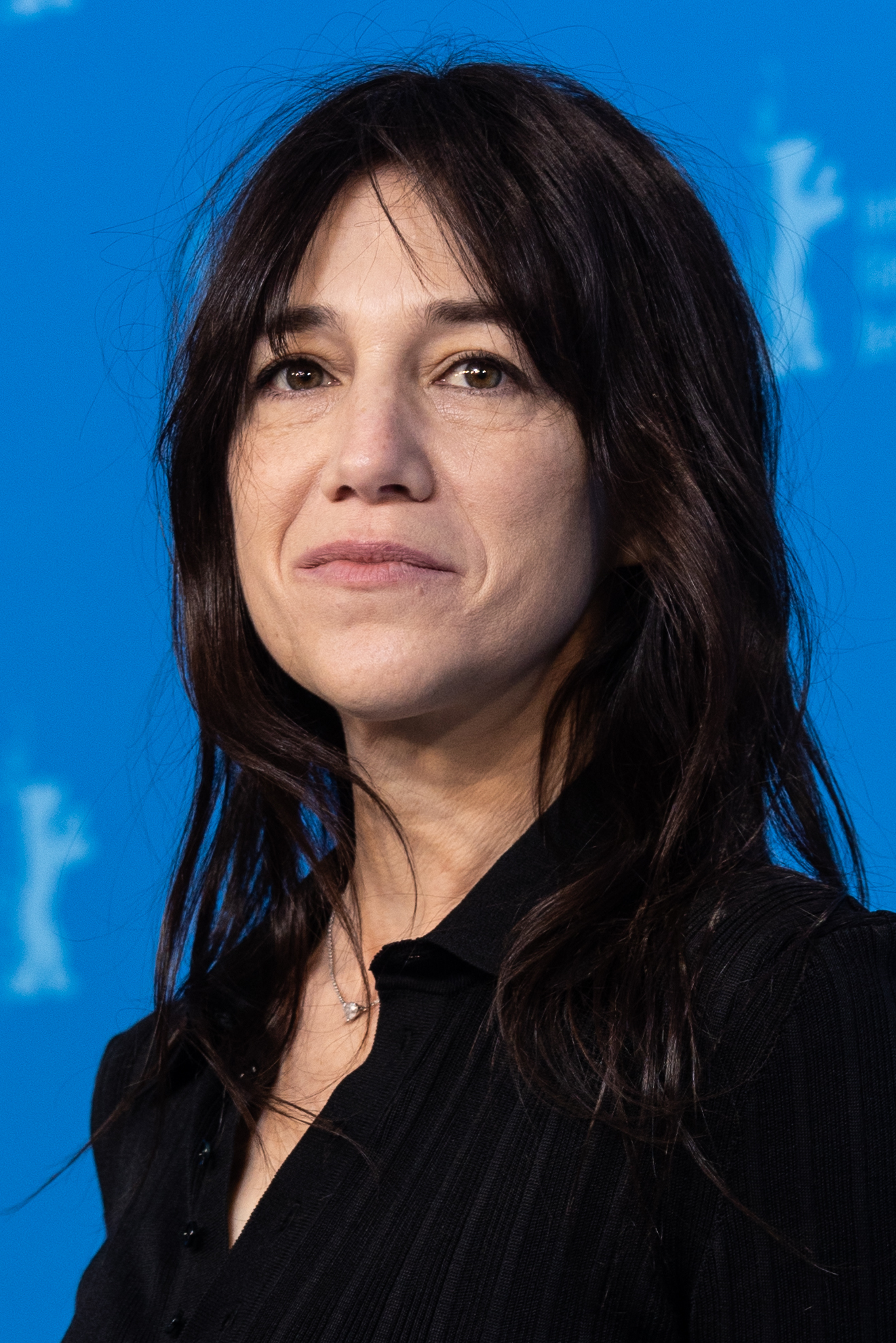
Charlotte Gainsbourg

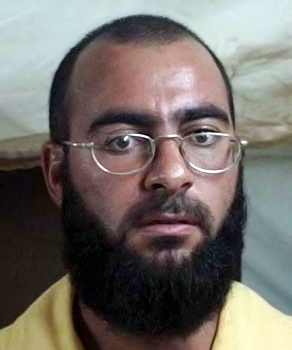
Abu Bakr al-Baghdadi

- July 1
  - Julianne Nicholson, American actress
  - Amira Casar, French actress
  - Missy Elliott, African-American rapper and singer-songwriter
- July 3
  - Julian Assange, Australian activist
  - Benedict Wong, English actor
- July 7 – Christian Camargo, American actor, producer, writer and director
- July 8
  - Marc Andreessen, American software developer
  - Marcel Blaguet Ledjou, Ivorian Chairman of the Africa Scout Committee
  - Scott Grimes, American actor
  - John Juanda, Indonesian-American professional poker player
- July 11
  - Brett Hauer, American ice hockey player
  - Park Hyuk-kwon, South Korean actor
- July 12 – Kristi Yamaguchi, American figure skater
- July 13 – MF Doom, British-American rapper (d. 2020)
- July 14
  - Howard Webb, English football referee
- July 16 – Corey Feldman, American actor
- July 17 – Cory Doctorow, Canadian author and activist
- July 18
  - Penny Hardaway, American basketball player
  - Sukhwinder Singh, Indian playback singer
- July 19 – Vitali Klitschko, Ukrainian boxer and politician
- July 20 – Sandra Oh, Korean actress
- July 21 – Charlotte Gainsbourg, Anglo-French actress and singer-songwriter
- July 22 – Kristine Lilly, American soccer player
- July 23
  - Ahmed Ezz, Egyptian actor
  - Alison Krauss, American country singer
  - Stacie Mistysyn, American-Canadian actress
- July 26 – Khaled Mahmud, Bangladeshi cricketer
- July 28 – Abu Bakr al-Baghdadi, Iraqi Islamic extremist leader (d. 2019)
- July 30 – Mzukisi Sikali, South African triple world champion boxer (d. 2005)

=== August ===
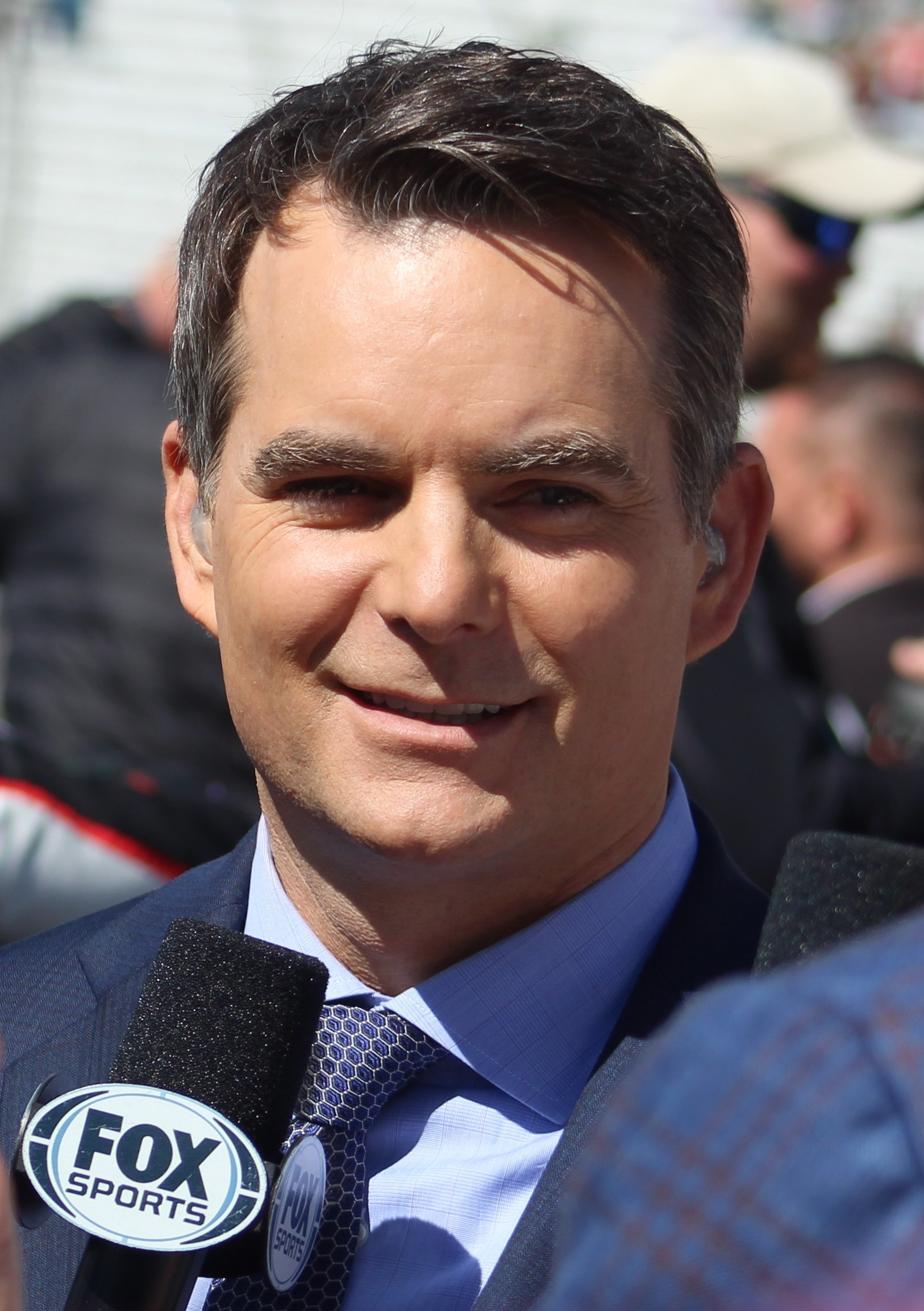
Jeff Gordon

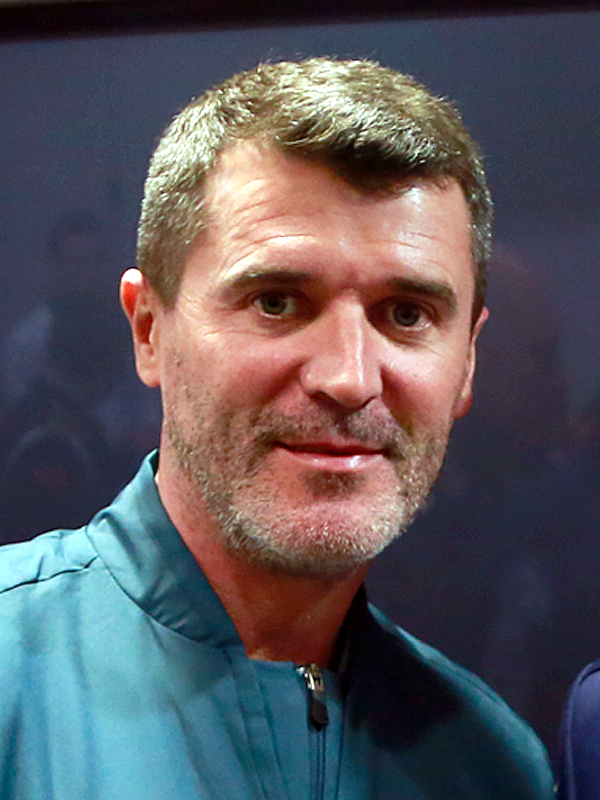
Roy Keane

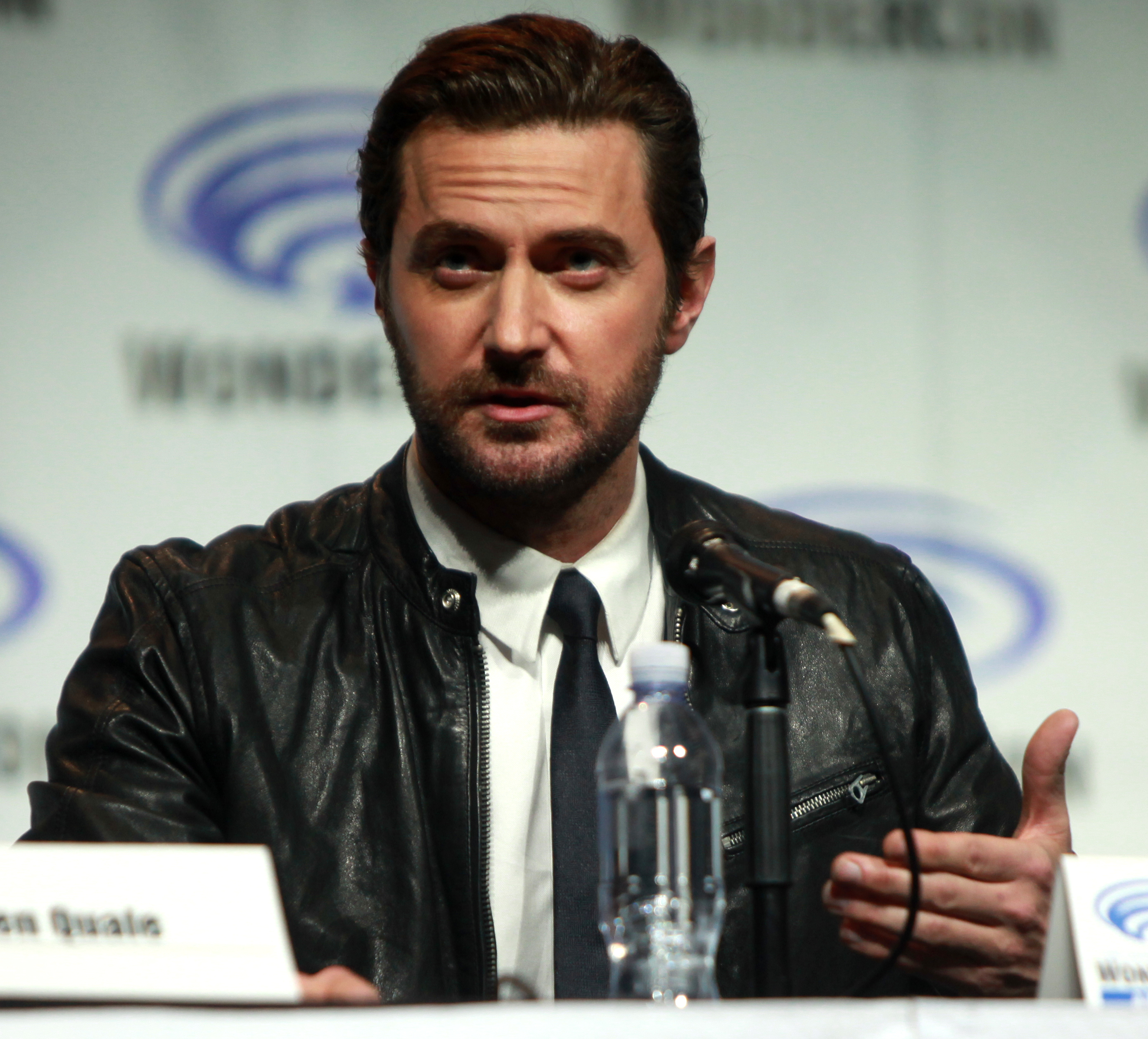
Richard Armitage

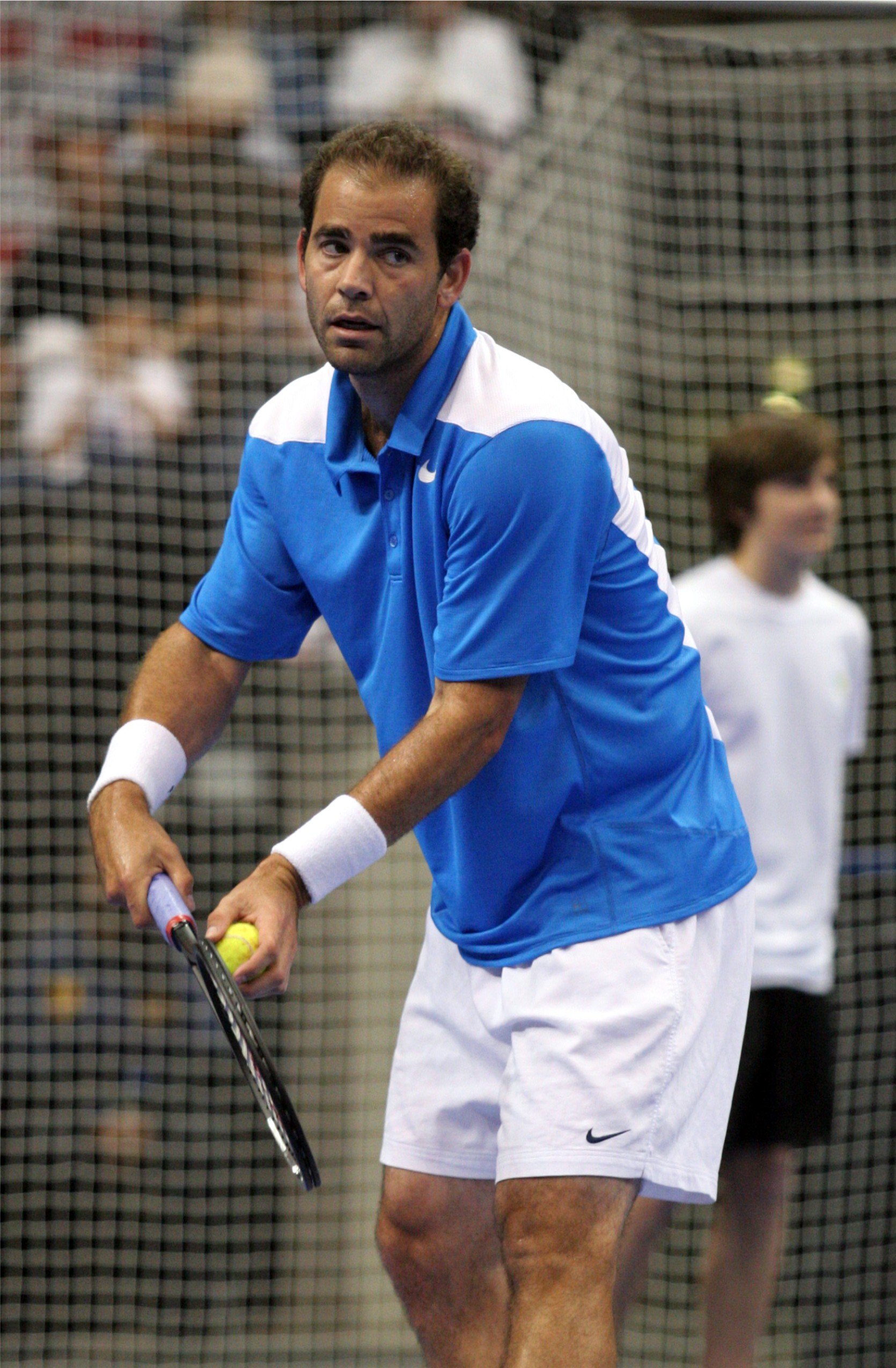
Pete Sampras

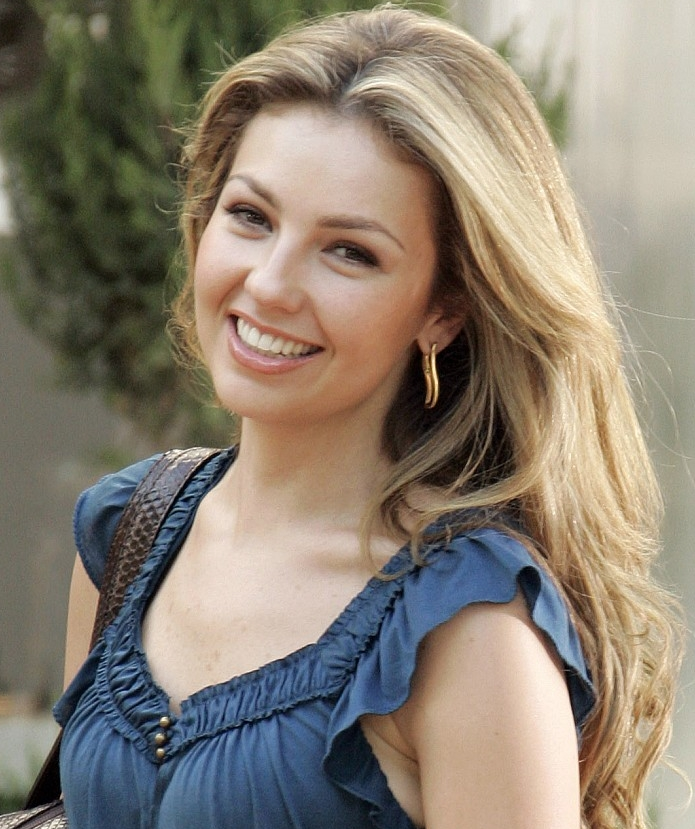
Thalía

- August 1 – Juan Camilo Mouriño, Mexican politician (d. 2008)
- August 4
  - Jeff Gordon, American race car driver
  - Yo-Yo, African-American rapper
- August 5 – Valdis Dombrovskis, Latvian Prime Minister and European Commissioner
- August 10
  - Roy Keane, Irish footballer and manager
  - Mario César Kindelán Mesa, Cuban amateur boxer
  - Justin Theroux, American actor
- August 12
  - Yvette Nicole Brown, American actress and comedian
  - Pete Sampras, American tennis player
- August 13
  - Moritz Bleibtreu, German actor
  - Heike Makatsch, German actress
- August 14 – Peter Franzén, Finnish actor
- August 17 – Jorge Posada, Puerto Rican baseball player
- August 18 – Aphex Twin, Irish-born British electronic musician
- August 19 – Mary Joe Fernández, American tennis player
- August 20
  - Ke Huy Quan, Vietnamese actor
  - David Walliams, British actor, author and comedian
- August 21 – Robert Harvey, Australian rules footballer
- August 22
  - Richard Armitage, English actor
  - Benoît Violier, French born-Swiss chef (d. 2016)
- August 23 – Gretchen Whitmer, American politician and 49th Governor of Michigan
- August 25 – Ayumi Miyazaki, Japanese singer
- August 26 – Thalía, Mexican actress and singer
- August 27 – Julian Cheung, Hong Kong actor and singer
- August 28 – Janet Evans, American swimmer
- August 29 – Carla Gugino, American actress
- August 31
  - Pádraig Harrington, Irish golfer
  - Kinga Preis, Polish actress
  - Chris Tucker, American actor and comedian
  - Alicia Villarreal, Mexican singer and songwriter

=== September ===
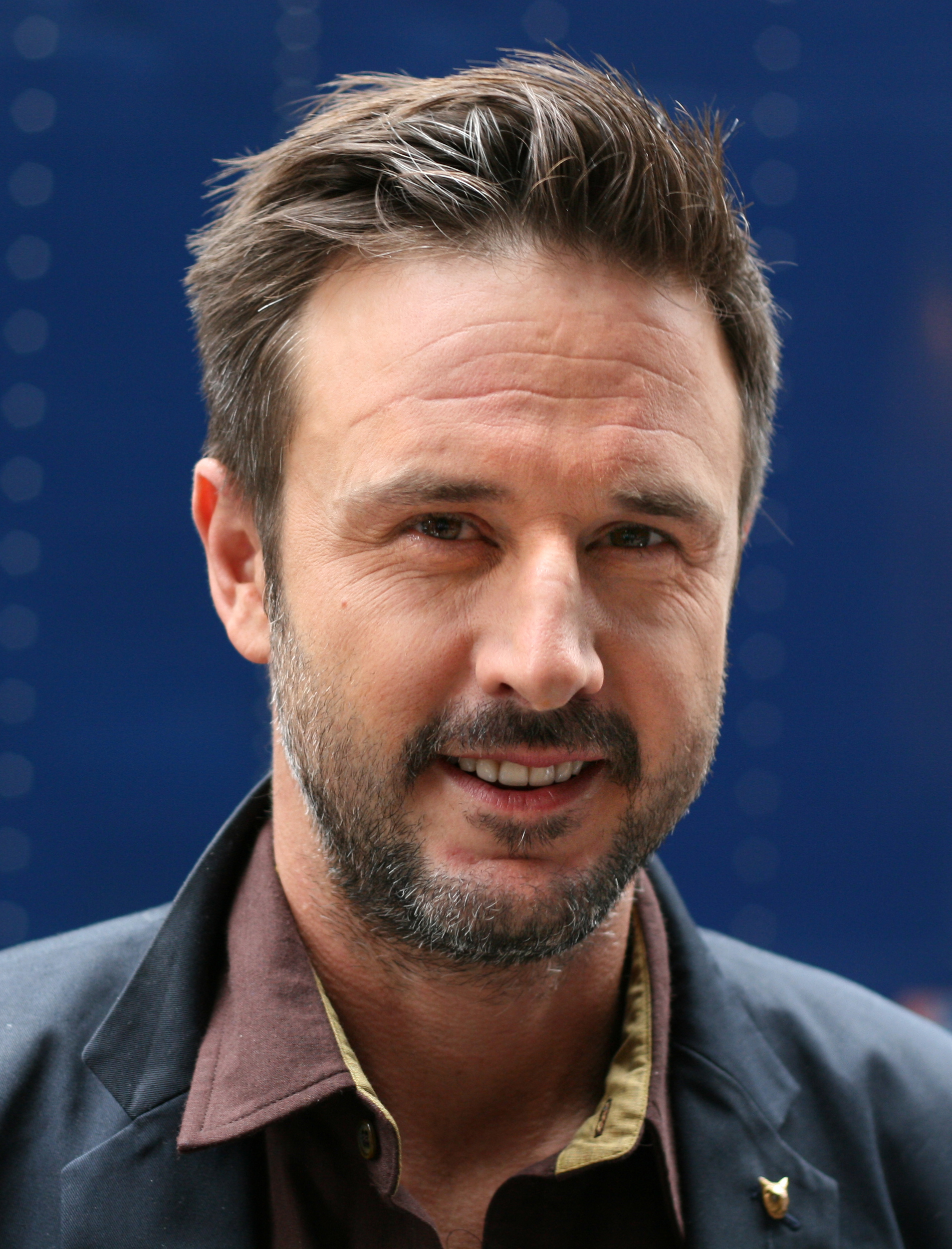
David Arquette

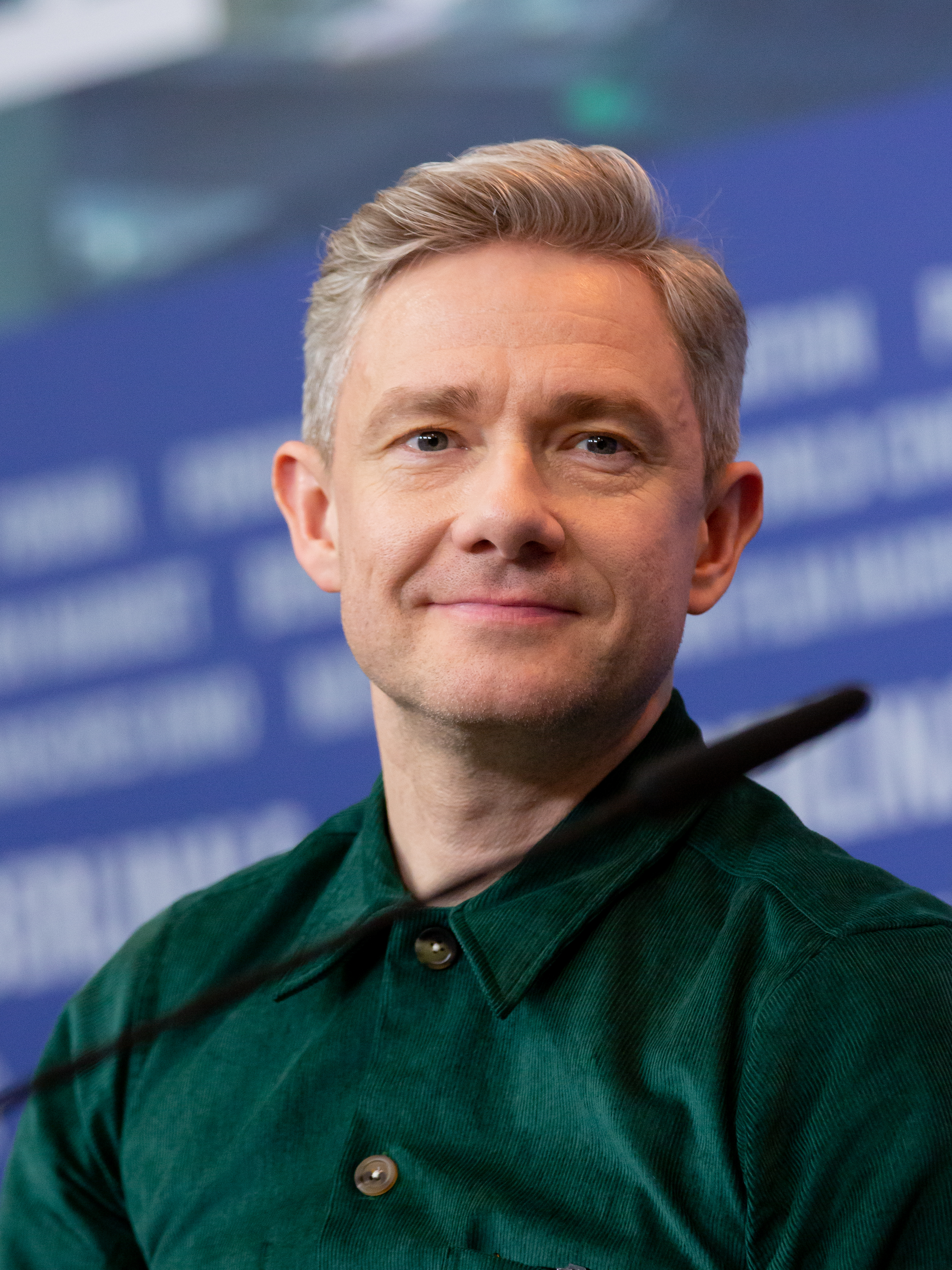
Martin Freeman

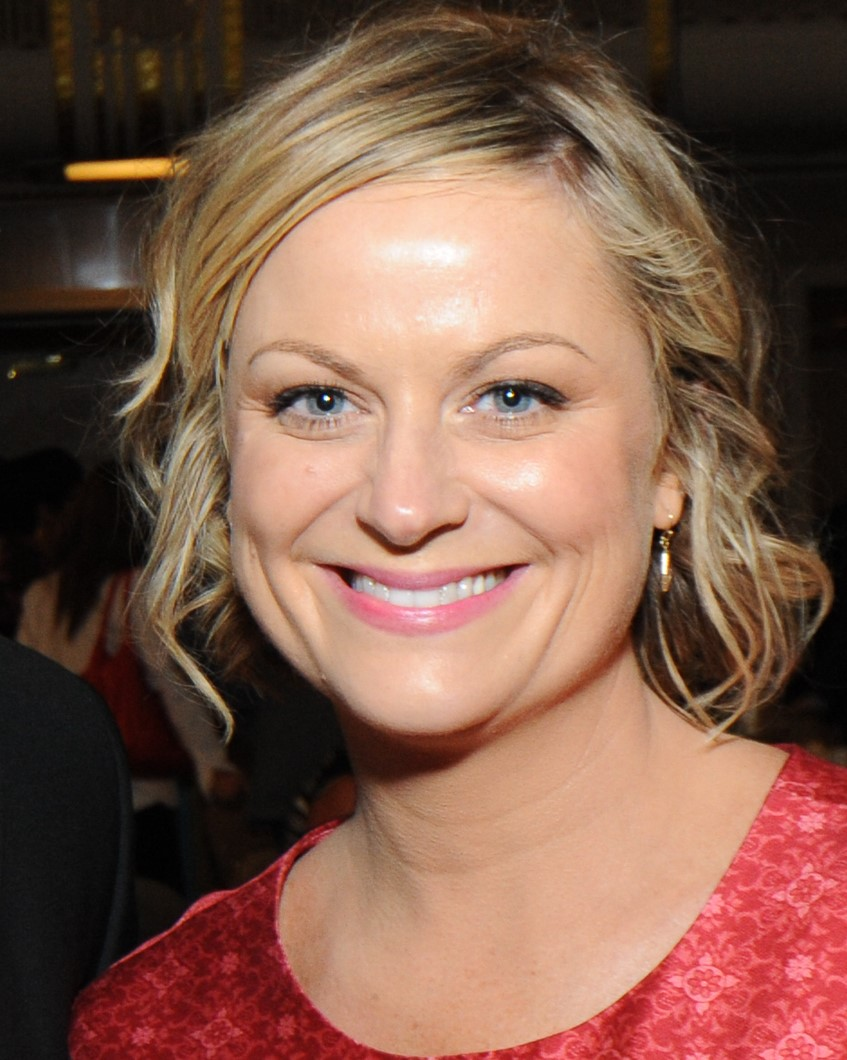
Amy Poehler

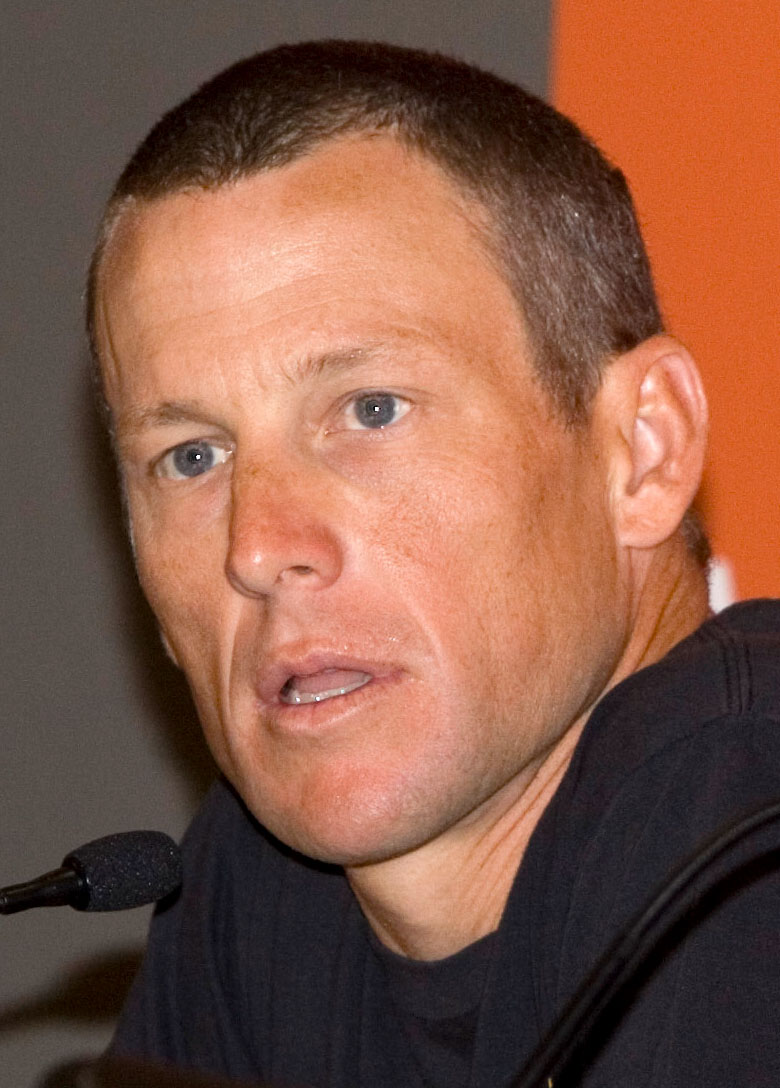
Lance Armstrong

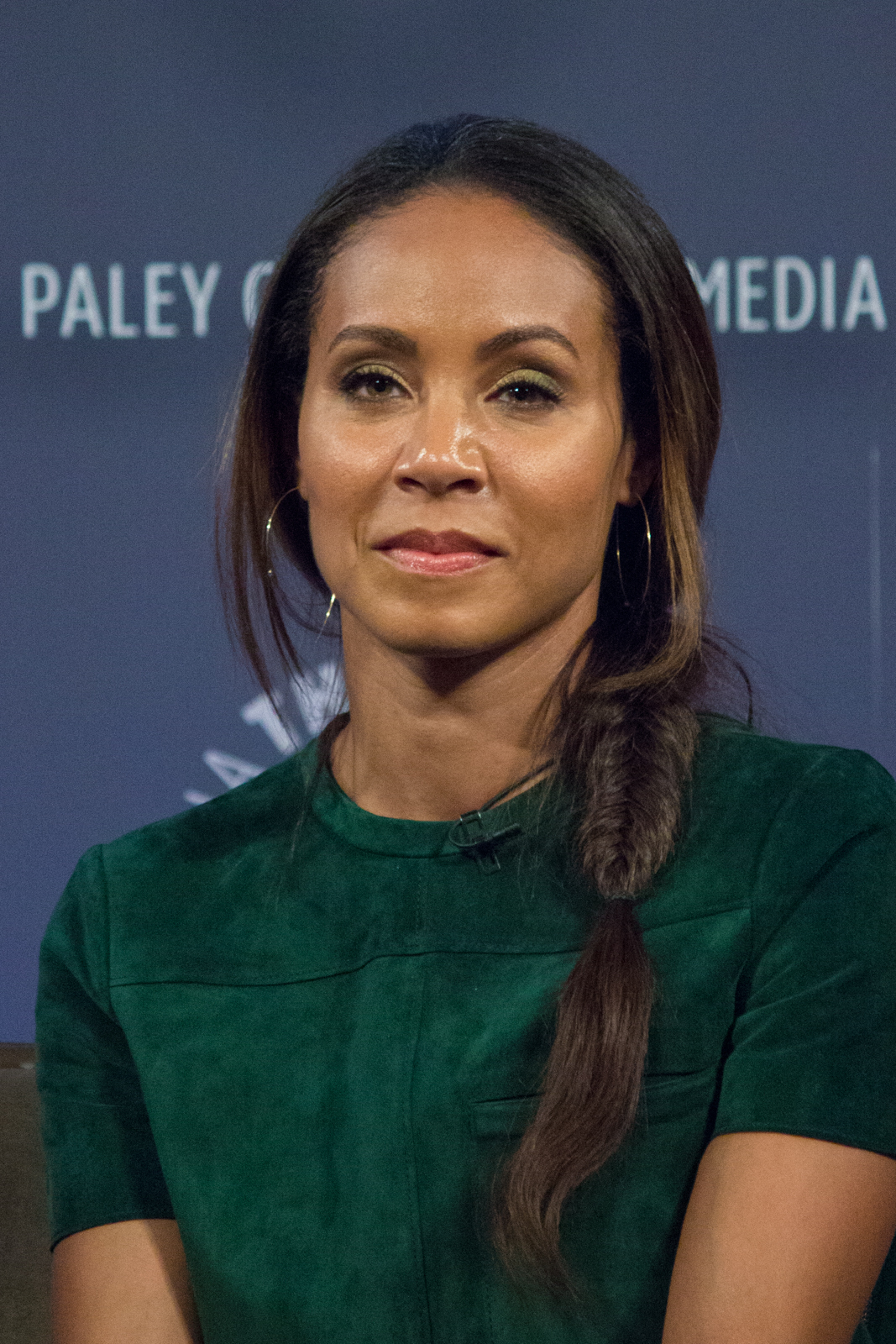
Jada Pinkett Smith

- September 1 – Hakan Şükür, Turkish footballer
- September 2
  - Kjetil André Aamodt, Norwegian alpine skier
  - César Sánchez, Spanish footballer
- September 4
  - Mark Knowles, Bahamian tennis player
  - Anita Yuen, Hong Kong actress
- September 6 – Dolores O'Riordan, Irish singer (The Cranberries) (d. 2018)
- September 7
  - Shane Mosley, African-American professional boxer
  - Briana Scurry, American soccer player
- September 8
  - David Arquette, American actor, professional wrestler, film director, producer, screenwriter and fashion designer
  - Martin Freeman, English actor
- September 9
  - Sofía Cid, Chilean politician
  - Henry Thomas, American actor
- September 11 – Alessandra Rosaldo, Mexican actress, singer and dancer
- September 13
  - Goran Ivanišević, Croatian tennis player
  - Stella McCartney, British fashion designer, daughter of Paul McCartney
- September 14 – André Matos, Brazilian singer (d. 2019)
- September 15 – Josh Charles, American actor
- September 16 – Amy Poehler, American actress
- September 17
  - Edílson, Brazilian footballer
  - Adriana Sklenarikova, Slovak fashion model and actress
  - Jens Voigt, German cyclist
- September 18
  - Lance Armstrong, American cyclist
  - Anna Netrebko, Russian operatic soprano
  - Jada Pinkett Smith, American actress, singer, and songwriter
- September 19 – Sanaa Lathan, American actress
- September 20 – Henrik Larsson, Swedish footballer and manager
- September 21
  - Alfonso Ribeiro, American actor, television director, dancer and TV presenter
  - Luke Wilson, American actor
- September 23 – Lee Mi-yeon, South Korean actress
- September 27 – Horacio Sandoval, Mexican artist
- September 29
  - Onyeka Ibe, Nigerian-born American painter
  - Sibel Tüzün, Turkish pop/rock/jazz singer
- September 30
  - Jenna Elfman, American actress
  - Fabiola Zavarce, Venezuelan activist

=== October ===
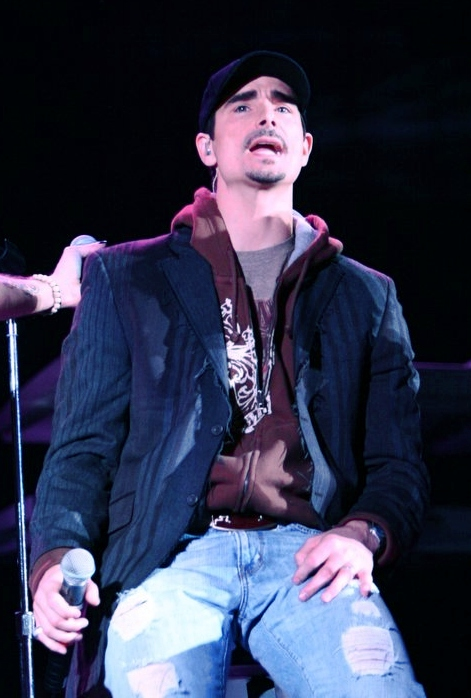
Kevin Richardson

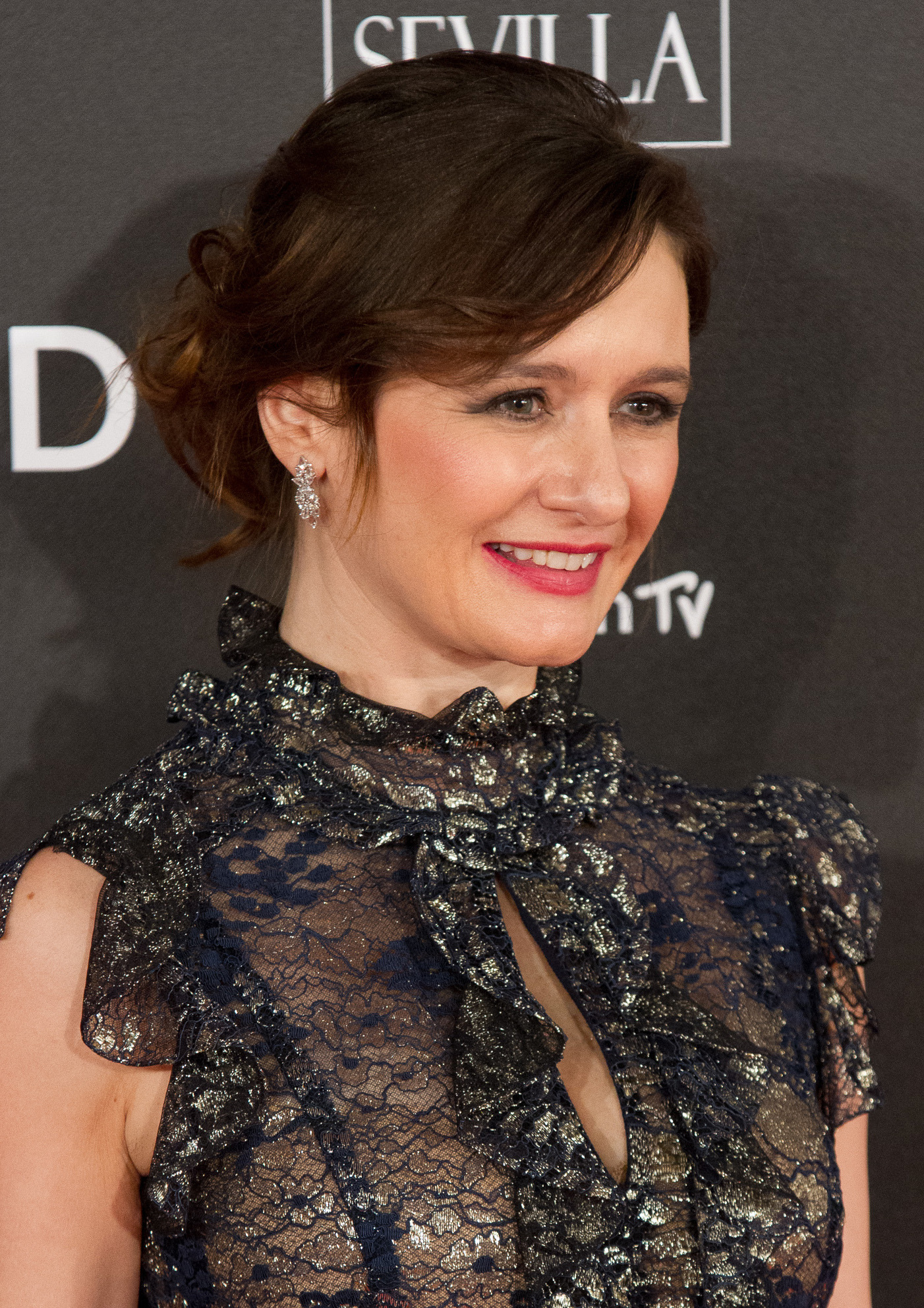
Emily Mortimer

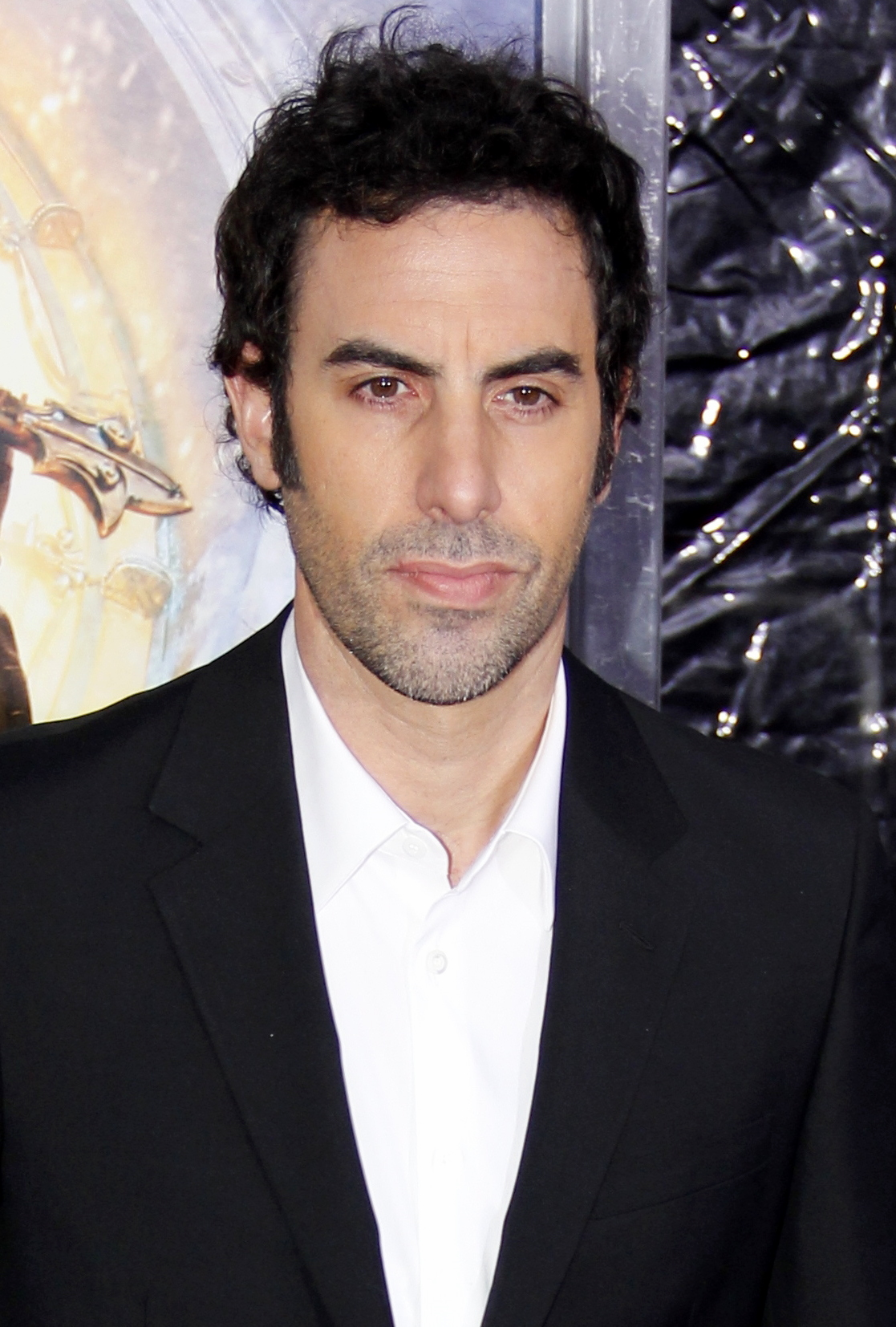
Sacha Baron Cohen

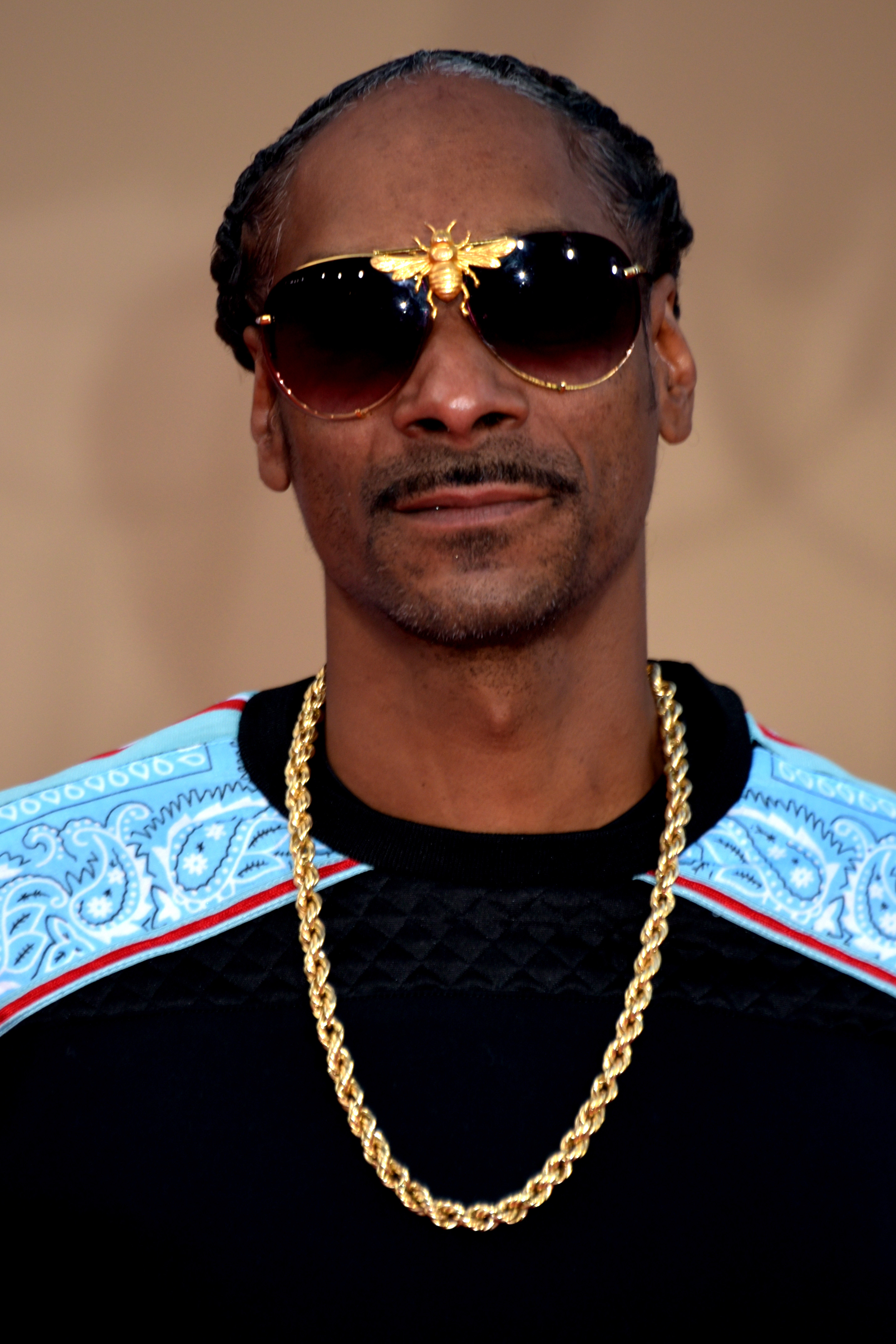
Snoop Dogg

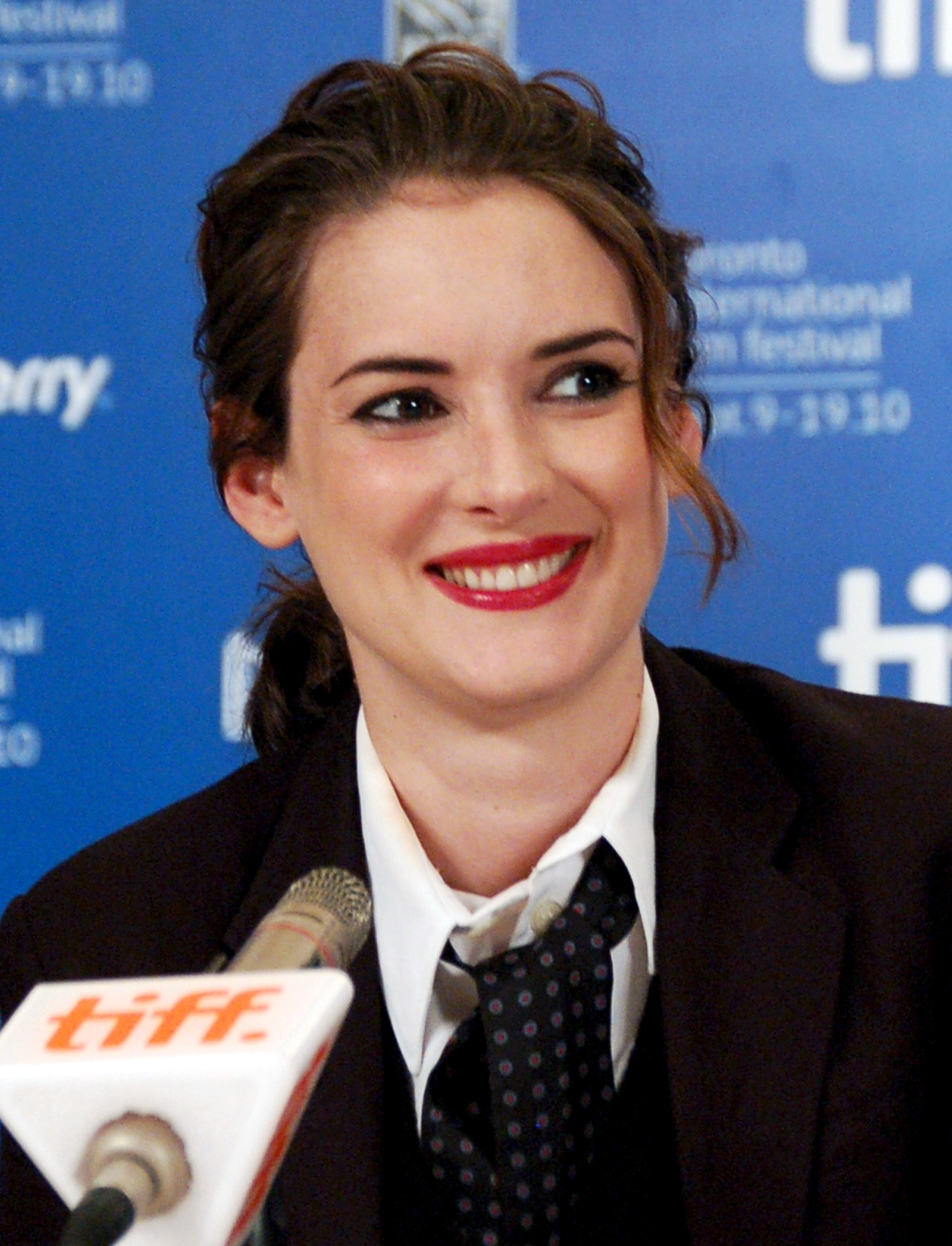
Winona Ryder

- October 1 – Gigi Lai, Hong Kong actress and singer
- October 2
  - Tiffany Darwish, American singer
  - Jim Root, American guitarist (Slipknot, ex-Stone Sour)
- October 3 – Kevin Richardson, American pop singer
- October 4
  - BT, American electronic musician and DJ
  - Ridwan Kamil, Indonesian architect, politician and current governor of West Java
- October 6 – Emily Mortimer, English actress and screenwriter
- October 7
  - Yelena Shevchenko, Soviet gymnast
  - Melinda Schneider, Australian singer and songwriter
- October 8 – Mayrín Villanueva, Mexican actress and model
- October 10 – Evgeny Kissin, Russian pianist
- October 11 – Aman Verma, Indian television anchor and actor
- October 12 – Đàm Vĩnh Hưng, Vietnamese singer
- October 13
  - Sacha Baron Cohen, English comedian and actor
  - Pyrros Dimas, Greek weightlifter
- October 14 – Jorge Costa, Portuguese footballer (d. 2025)
- October 15 – Niko Kovač, German-Croatian football player and coach
- October 17 – Andy Whitfield, Welsh actor and model (d. 2011)
- October 18
  - Yoo Sang-chul, South Korean footballer and manager (d. 2021)
  - Stavros V. Kyriakides, Cypriot businessman and Cultural Manager
- October 20
  - Snoop Dogg, African-American rapper, singer, songwriter, producer, media personality, entrepreneur, and actor
  - Dannii Minogue, Australian singer
- October 21 – Ted Budd, American politician
- October 22
  - Amanda Coetzer, South African tennis player
  - Jennifer Lee, American screenwriter, director, Chief Creative Officer of Walt Disney Animation Studios
- October 23 – Bohuslav Sobotka, 11th Prime Minister of the Czech Republic
- October 24
  - Caprice Bourret, American model and actress
  - Gustavo Jorge, Argentina rugby union player
  - Diane Guthrie-Gresham, Jamaican track and field athletes
- October 25
  - Athena Chu, Hong Kong actress and singer
  - Midori Gotō, Japanese violinist
  - Pedro Martínez, Dominican baseball player
  - Craig Robinson, American actor, comedian and singer
- October 26 – Anthony Rapp, American actor and singer
- October 29
  - Chiara Badano, Italian Roman Catholic religious teenager and blessed (d. 1990)
  - Matthew Hayden, Australian cricketer
  - Ma Huateng, Chinese business magnate, founder of TenCent
  - Winona Ryder, American actress

=== November ===
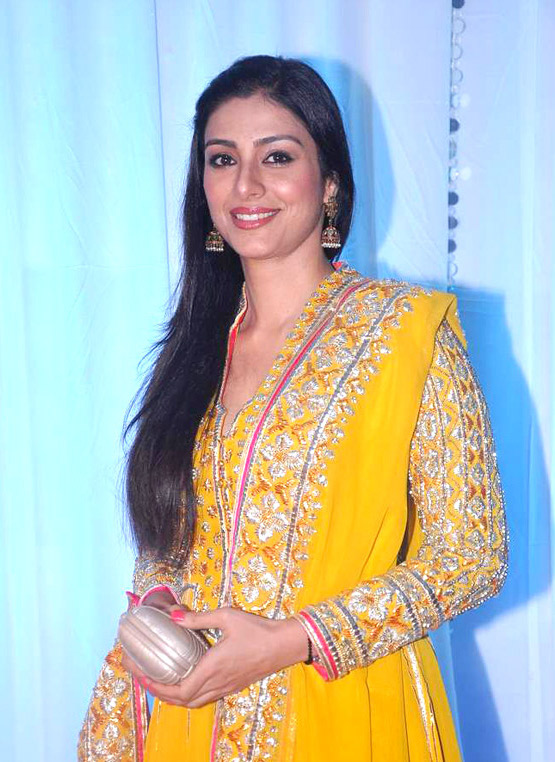
Tabu

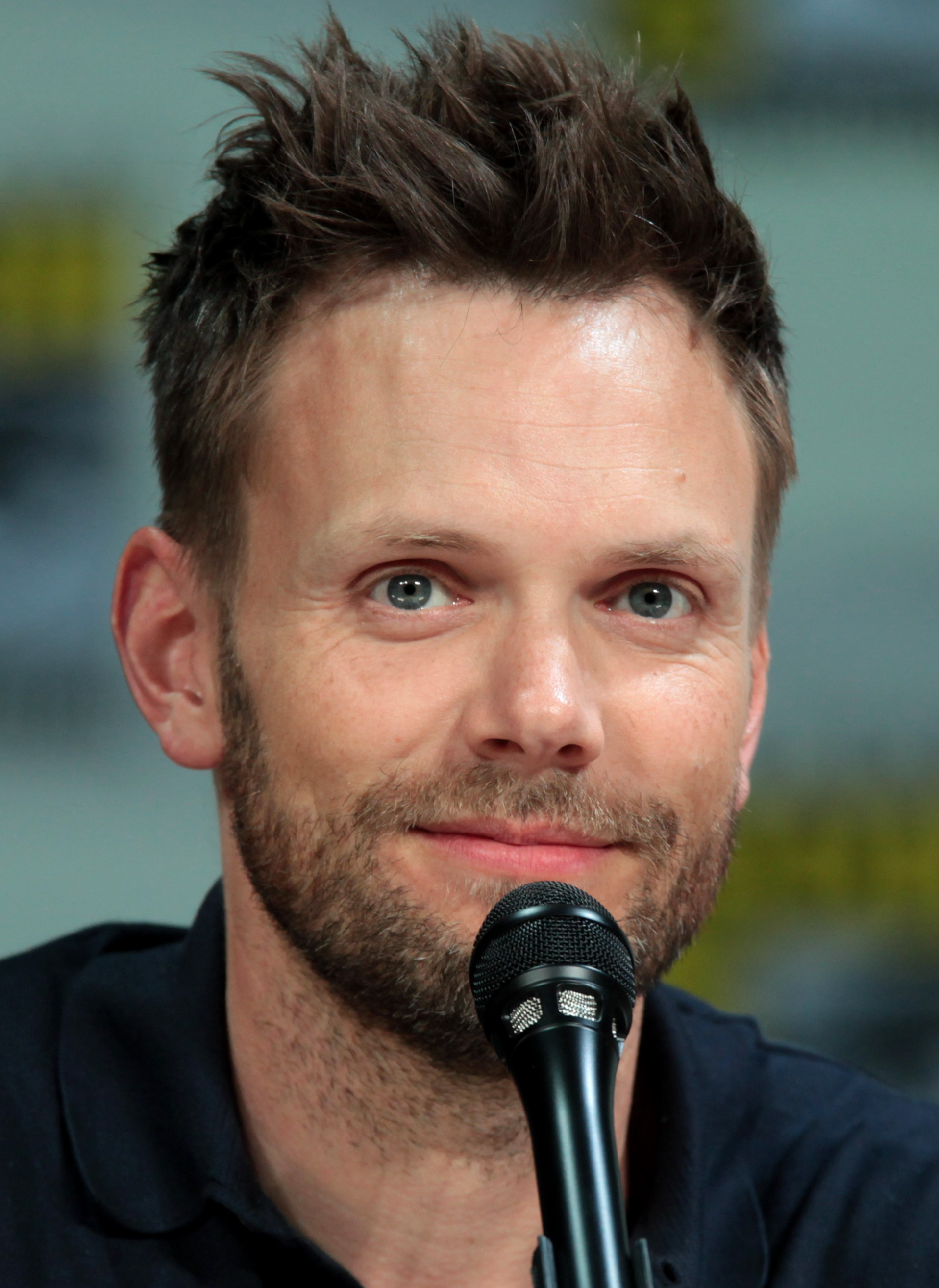
Joel McHale

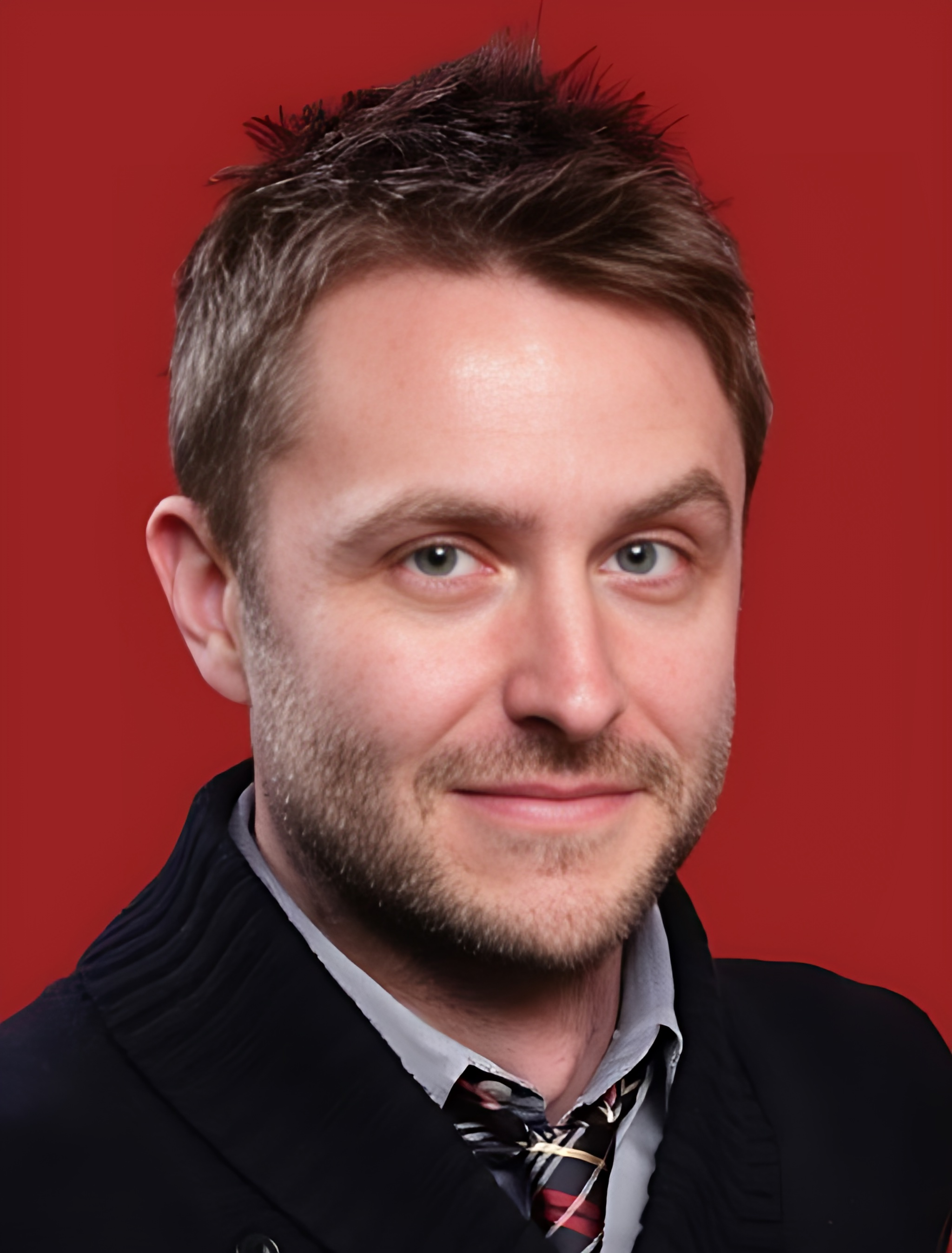
Chris Hardwick

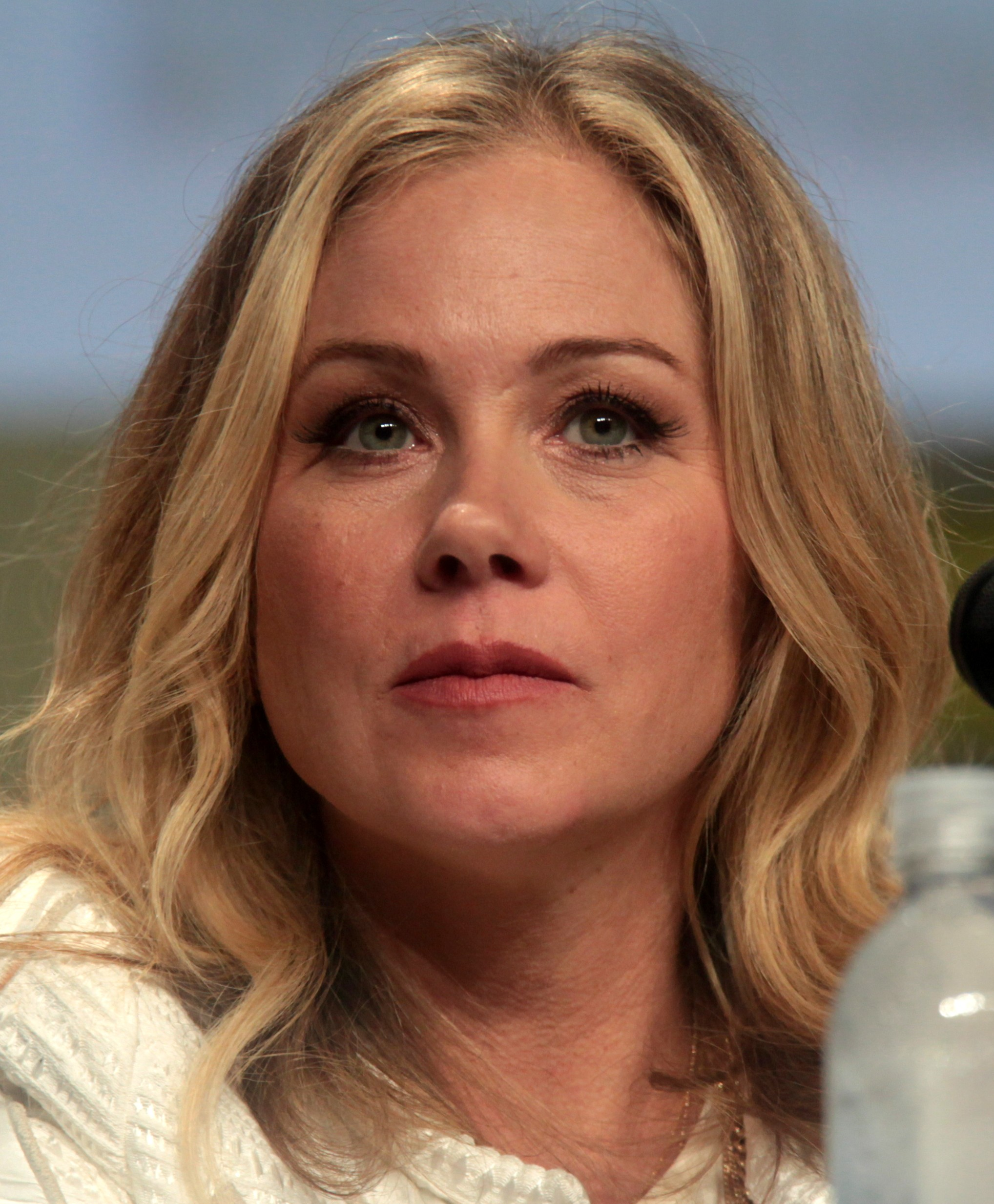
Christina Applegate

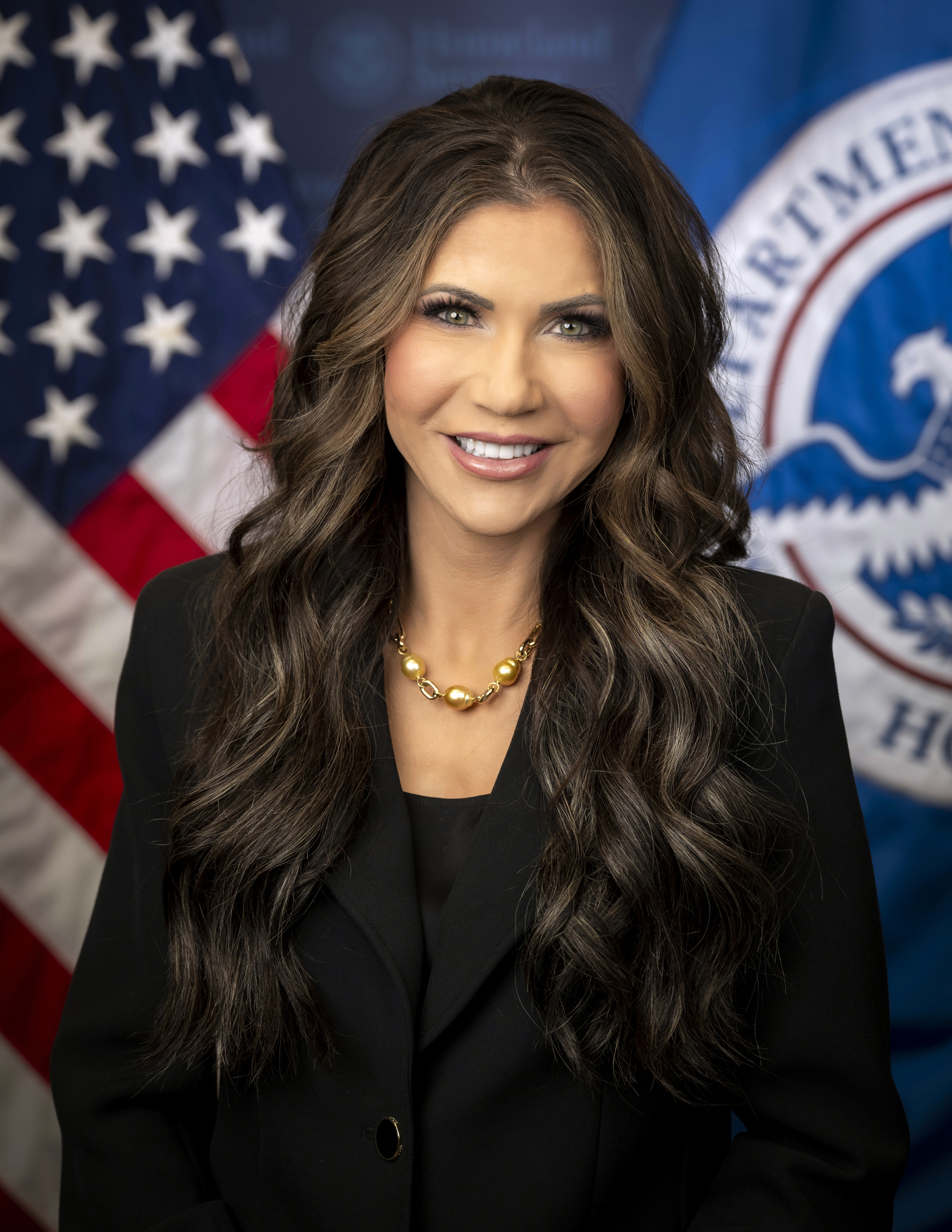
Kristi Noem

- November 3 – Unai Emery, Spanish football coach
- November 4
  - Marco Büchel – Swiss-born Liechtenstein alpine ski racer
  - Tabu, Indian actress
- November 6 – Laura Flessel-Colovic, French fencer and politician
- November 7
  - Martin Björk, Swedish television presenter
  - Rituparna Sengupta, Indian actress
- November 8 – Tech N9ne, American rapper
- November 9 – Melinda Kinnaman, Swedish-born American actress
- November 10
  - Big Pun, American/Latin rapper (d. 2000)
  - Fahri Hamzah, Indonesian politician
  - Niki Karimi, Iranian actress and movie director
  - Mario Abdo Benítez, President of Paraguay
- November 12
  - Yasuo Aiuchi, Japanese snowboarder
  - Chen Guangcheng, Chinese civil rights activist
- November 13
  - Tommi Ahvala, Finnish motorcyclist
  - Ulla Pirttijärvi-Länsman, Finnish joik singer
- November 14 – Adam Gilchrist, Australian cricketer
- November 15 – Delsa Solórzano, Venezuelan lawyer and politician
- November 16
  - Justine Clarke, Australian actress
  - Alexander Popov, Russian swimmer
- November 18
  - Karl Deisseroth, American optogeneticist, Nobel Prize laureate
  - Özlem Tekin, Turkish singer
- November 20
  - Dion Nash, New Zealand cricket captain
  - Joel McHale, Italian-born American comedian, actor, writer, producer and television host
- November 22 – Cecilia Suárez, Mexican actress and activist
- November 23 – Chris Hardwick, American actor, comedian and television host
- November 25 – Christina Applegate, American actress
- November 27
  - Albert Demchenko, Russian luger
  - Beat Bösch – Swiss Paralympic athlete
- November 28 – Fenriz, Norwegian musician
- November 30
  - Jessalyn Gilsig, Canadian actress
  - Markus Hauser, Swiss musician
  - Kristi Noem, American politician, 8th Secretary of Homeland Security

=== December ===
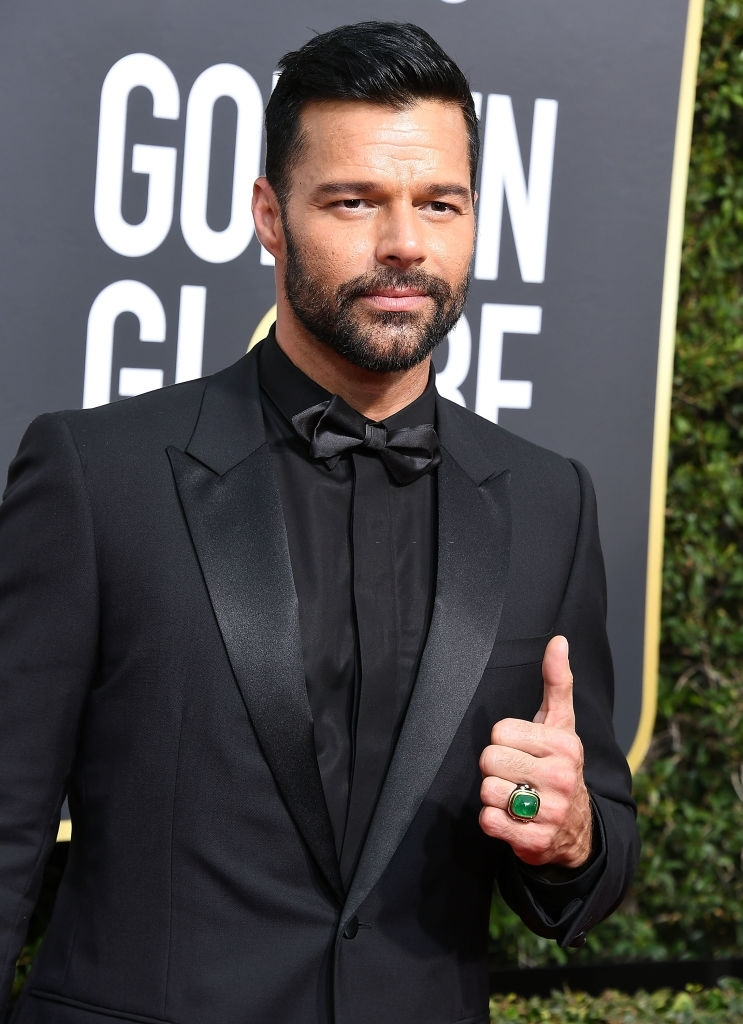
Ricky Martin

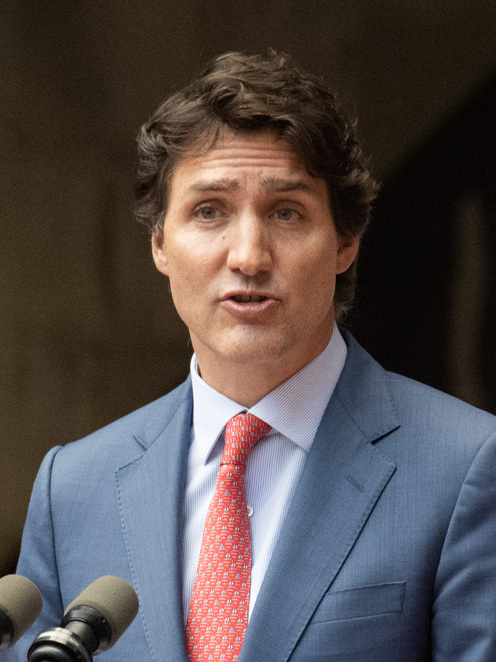
Justin Trudeau

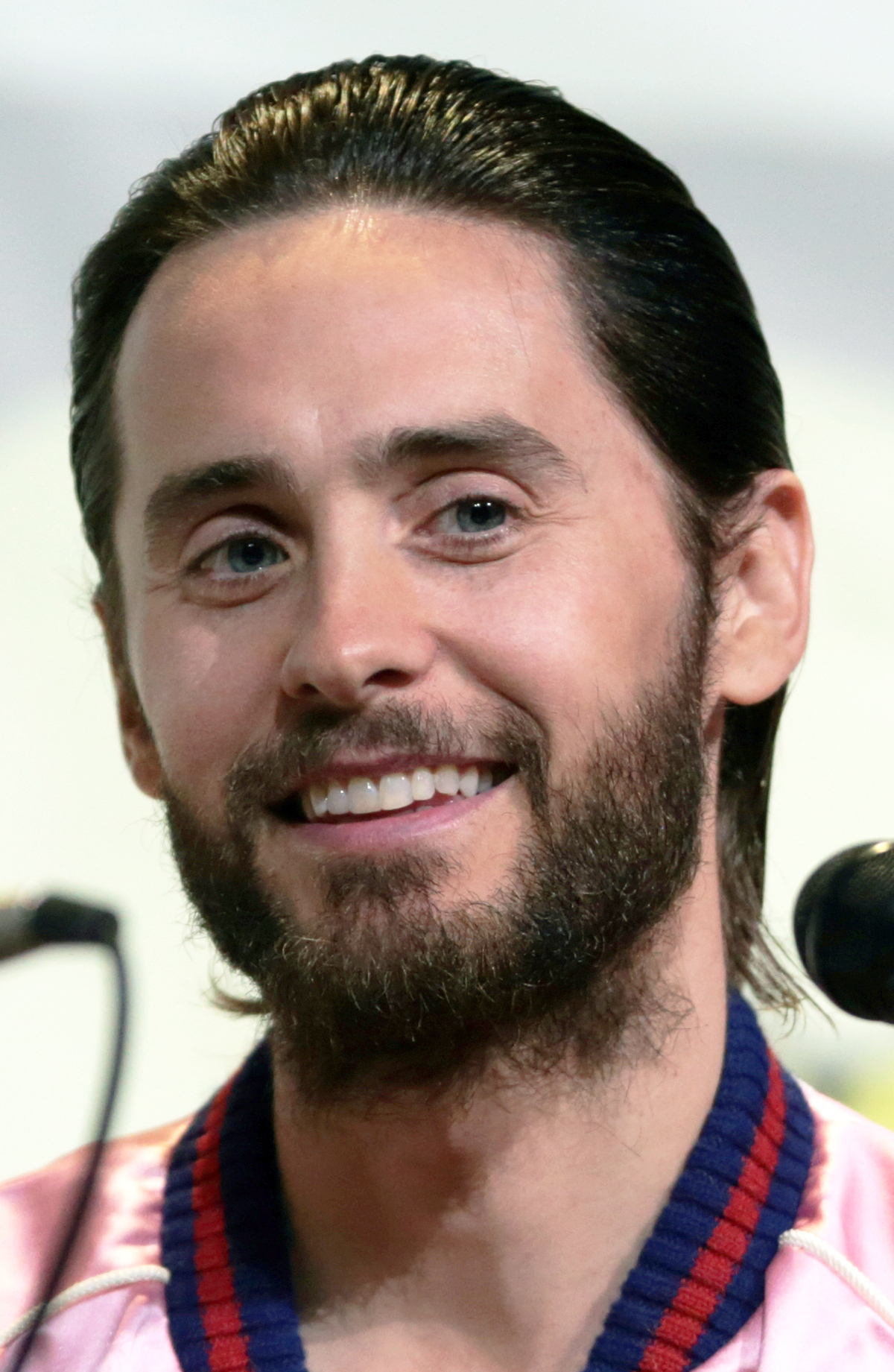
Jared Leto

- December 2 – Francesco Toldo, Italian footballer
- December 3 – Frank Sinclair, Jamaican footballer
- December 5
  - Katherine Haringhton, Venezuelan lawyer
  - Kali Rocha, American actress
- December 6
  - Richard Krajicek, Dutch tennis player
  - Ryan White, American AIDS activist (died 1990)
  - Craig Brewer, American film director
- December 7
  - Vladimir Akopian, Armenian chess player
  - Larisa Alexandrovna Horton, Ukrainian-American feminist
- December 9 – Aleksandra Gajewska, Polish theatre director, actress, and politician
- December 11 – Erkan Petekkaya, Turkish actor
- December 12
  - Sammy Korir, Kenyan long-distance runner
  - Alireza Mansourian, Iranian footballer
- December 13 – Sakis Arnaoutoglou, Greek politician
- December 15 – Necati Şaşmaz, Turkish actor
- December 16
  - Scott Booth, Scottish footballer
  - Israel Cohen, Israeli footballer
  - Paul van Dyk, German dance music DJ, musician and record producer
- December 17
  - Alan Khan, South African radio and TV presenter
  - Antoine Rigaudeau, French basketball player
  - Artur Petrosyan, Armenian footballer
- December 18
  - Arantxa Sánchez Vicario, Spanish tennis player
  - Lee Yen-hsiu, Taiwanese politician
- December 19
  - Amy Locane, American actress
  - Figen Yüksekdağ, Turkish politician
- December 21 – Natalie Grant, American singer and songwriter
- December 22
  - Khalid Khannouchi, Moroccan long-distance runner
  - Pat Mastroianni, Canadian actor
- December 23 – Corey Haim, Canadian actor (died 2010)
- December 24
  - Giorgos Alkaios, Greek recording artist
  - Ricky Martin, Puerto Rican singer
- December 25
  - Dido, English singer
  - Justin Trudeau, 23rd Prime Minister of Canada
- December 26 – Jared Leto, American actor and musician (Thirty Seconds to Mars)
- December 27 – Sergei Bodrov Jr., Russian actor (died 2002)
- December 31 – Brent Barry, American basketball player

=== Date unknown ===
- Marcela Walerstein, Venezuelan actress.

== Deaths ==
=== January ===
Coco Chanel

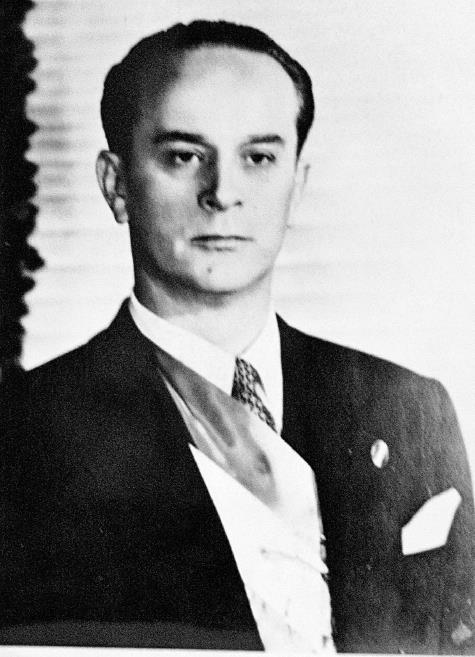
Jacobo Árbenz

- January 3 – Carlo Braga, Filipino Roman Catholic priest, archbishop and servant of God (b. 1889)
- January 4 – Arthur Ford, American psychic spiritual medium and clairaudient (b. 1896)
- January 5 – Douglas Shearer, Canadian film sound engineer (b. 1899)
- January 10 – Coco Chanel, French fashion designer (b. 1883)
- January 11 – Hussein Al Oweini, 18th Prime Minister of Lebanon (b. 1900)
- January 12 – John Tovey, 1st Baron Tovey, British admiral (b. 1885)
- January 14 – Guillermo de Torre, Spanish Dadaist author (b. 1900)
- January 15 – John Dall, American actor (b. 1920)
- January 17 – Lothar Rendulic, Austrian-born German general (b. 1887)
- January 20 – Broncho Billy Anderson, American actor, director, writer, and producer (b. 1880)
- January 24 – Bill W., co-founder Alcoholics Anonymous (b. 1895)
- January 25 – Hermann Hoth, German general (b. 1885)
- January 27 – Jacobo Árbenz, 19th president of Guatemala (b. 1913)
- January 28 – Donald Winnicott, British psychoanalyst (b. 1896)

=== February ===
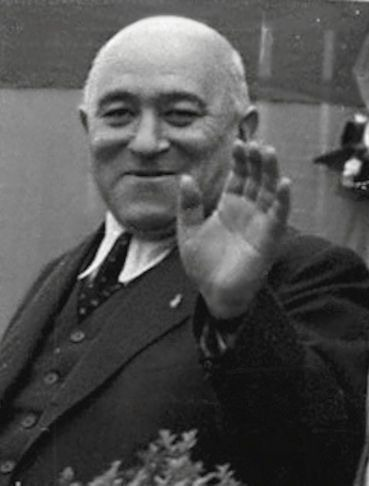
Mátyás Rákosi

- February 1 – Raoul Hausmann, Austrian artist (b. 1886)
- February 3 – Jay C. Flippen, American actor (b. 1899)
- February 4 – Brock Chisholm, Canadian physician, 1st Director-General of World Health Organization (b. 1896)
- February 5 – Mátyás Rákosi, 43rd Prime Minister of Hungary (b. 1892)
- February 6 – Shigeru Fukudome, Japanese admiral (b. 1891)
- February 8 – Victoriano Gómez Urrutia, Salvadoran murderer (b. 1943)
- February 12 – James Cash Penney, American businessman, founder of J. C. Penney (b. 1875)
- February 17 – Adolf A. Berle, American lawyer, educator, author and diplomat (b. 1895)
- February 18 – Jaime de Barros Câmara, Brazilian archbishop (b. 1894)
- February 19 – Ibrahim Mohammad Jahfar, Bruneian politician (b. 1902)
- February 25 – Theodor Svedberg, Swedish chemist, Nobel Prize laureate (b. 1884)
- February 26 – Fernandel, French actor (b. 1903)

=== March ===
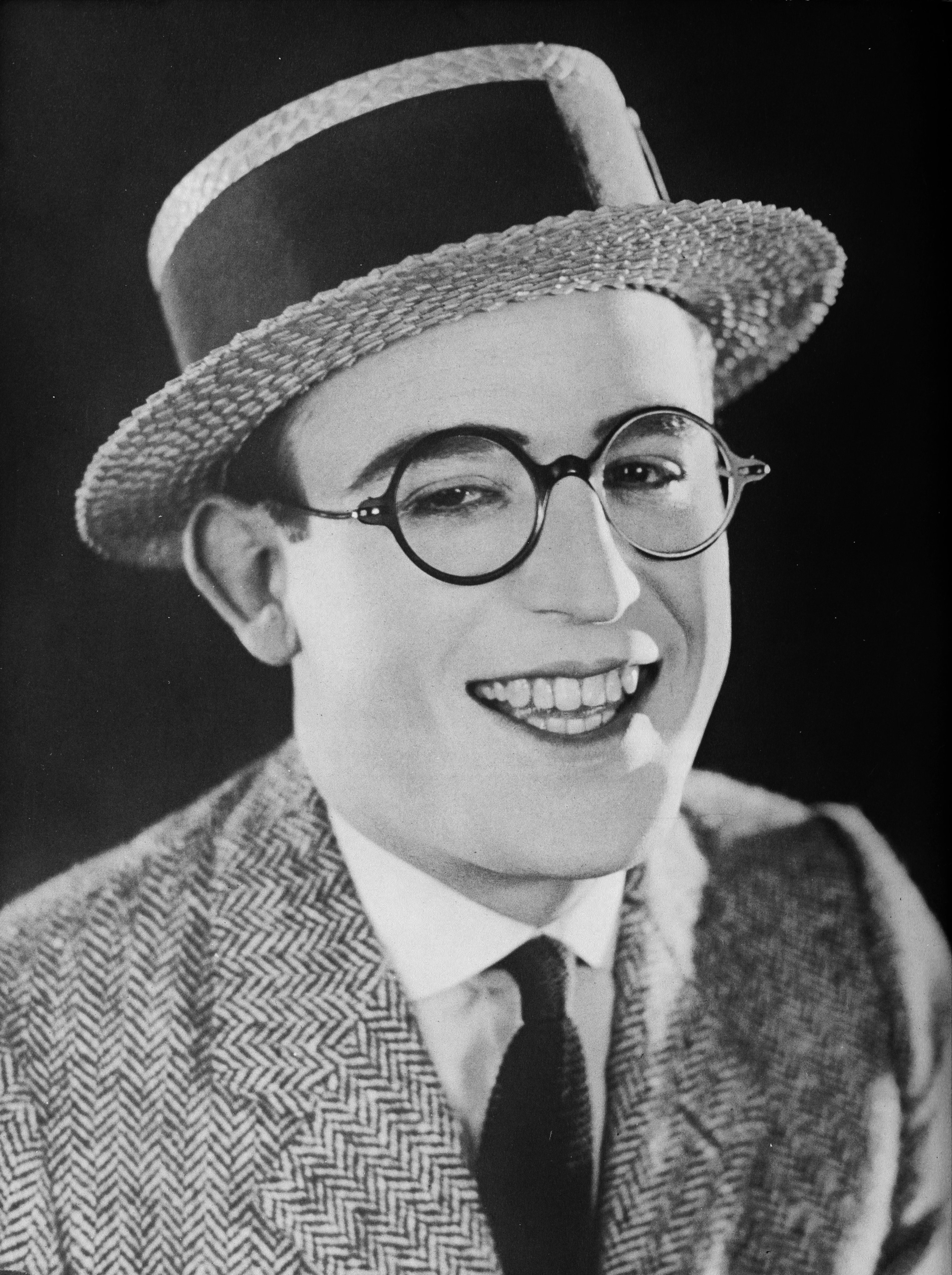
Harold Lloyd

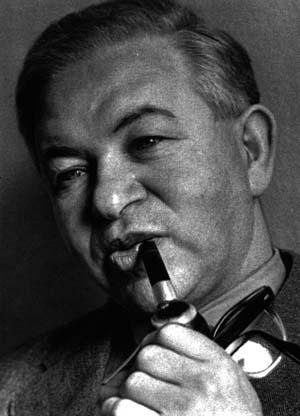
Arne Jacobsen

- March 3 – António Silva, Portuguese actor (b. 1886)
- March 7 – Stevie Smith (Florence Margaret Smith), English poet and novelist (b. 1902)
- March 8 – Harold Lloyd, American actor and filmmaker (b. 1893)
- March 9
  - Anthony Berkeley Cox, English writer (b. 1893)
  - Pope Cyril VI of Alexandria, Coptic Orthodox Patriarch (b. 1902)
- March 11
  - Philo Farnsworth, American television pioneer (b. 1906)
  - C. D. Broad, English philosopher (b. 1887)
- March 12 –
  - David Burns, American actor (b. 1902)
  - Paul Dorfman, Chicago mobster
- March 16
  - Bebe Daniels, American actress (b. 1901)
  - Thomas E. Dewey, Governor of New York; American presidential candidate (b. 1902)
- March 22 – Nella Walker, American actress and vaudevillian (b. 1886)
- March 23 – Basil Dearden, English film director (b. 1911)
- March 24 – Arne Jacobsen, Danish architect and designer (b. 1902)

=== April ===
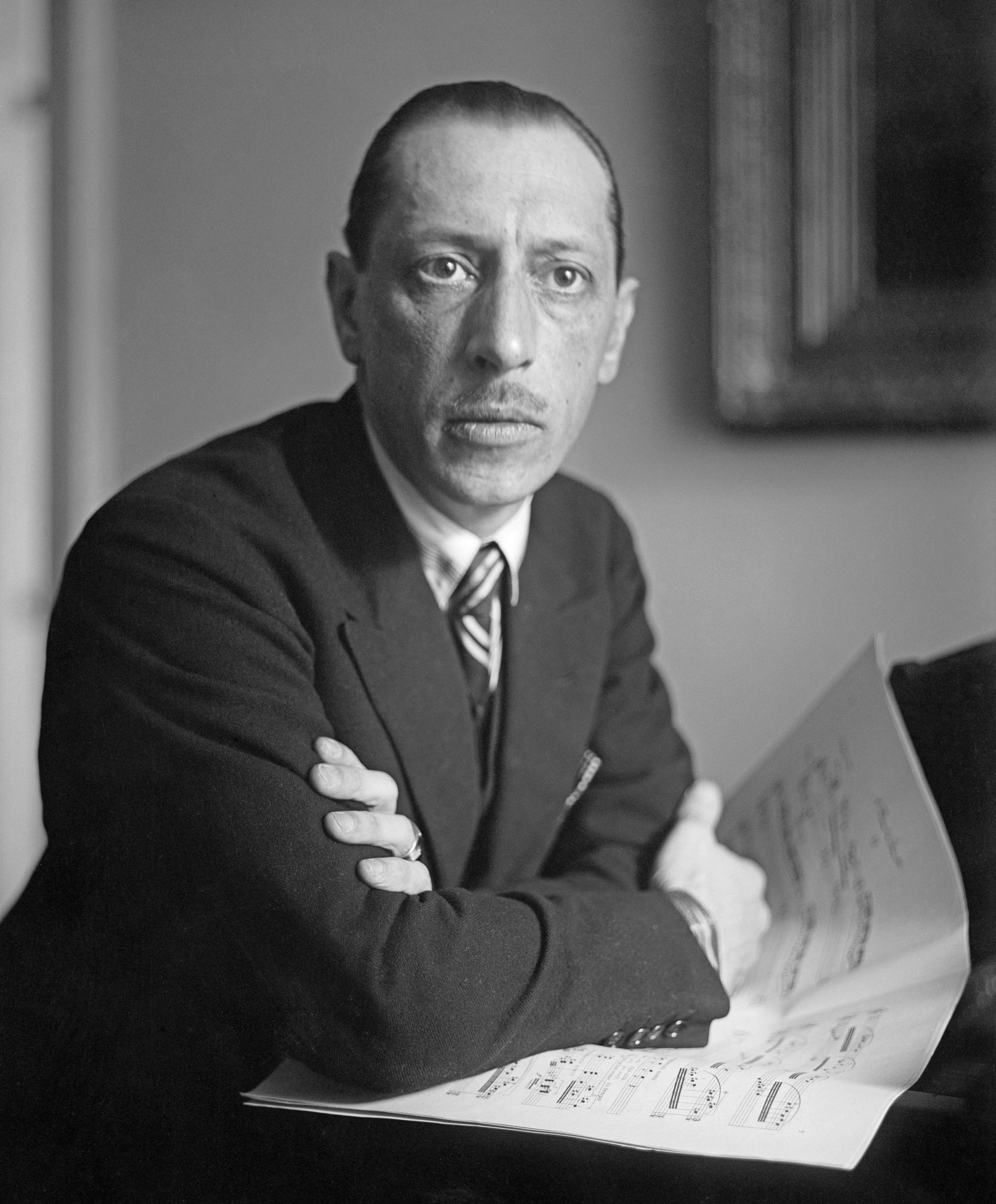
Igor Stravinsky

- April 3 – Joseph Valachi, American gangster (b. 1904)
- April 6 – Igor Stravinsky, Russian composer (b. 1882)
- April 12 – Igor Tamm, Russian physicist, Nobel Prize laureate (b. 1895)
- April 15 – Friedebert Tuglas, Estonian writer and critic (b. 1886)
- April 19 – Earl Thomson, Canadian athlete (b. 1895)
- April 20 – Cecil Parker, English actor (b. 1897)
- April 21
  - François Duvalier, 32nd President of Haiti (b. 1907)
  - Edmund Lowe, American actor (b. 1890)
- April 25 – T. V. Soong, Premier of the Republic of China (b. 1891)
- April 30 – Albin Stenroos, Finnish athlete (b. 1889)

=== May ===
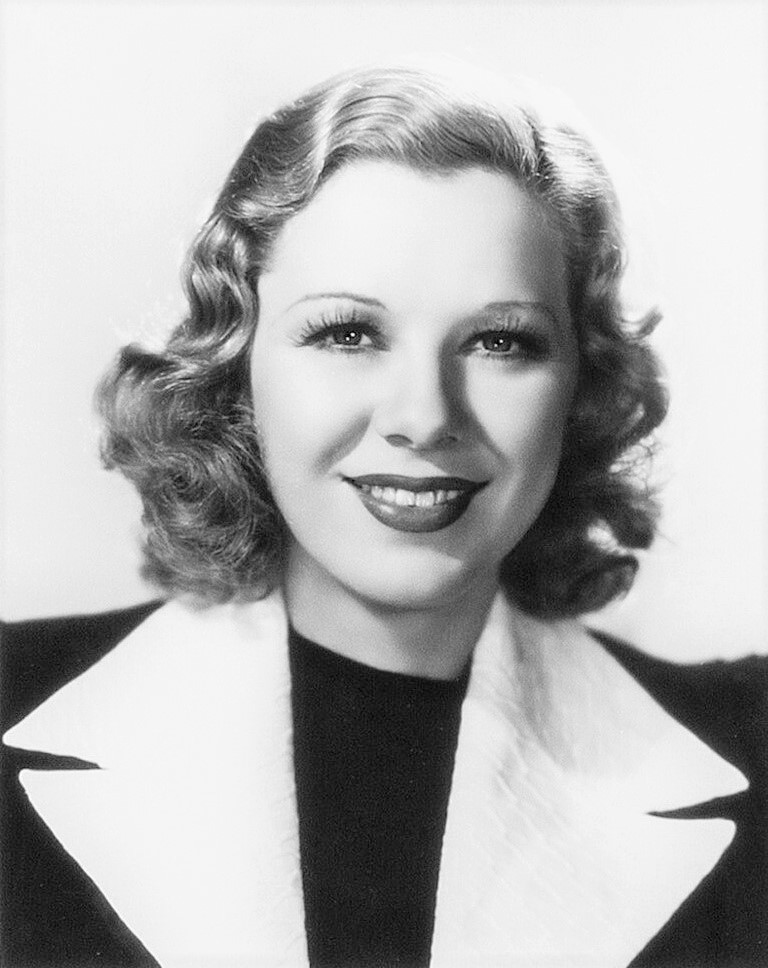
Glenda Farrell

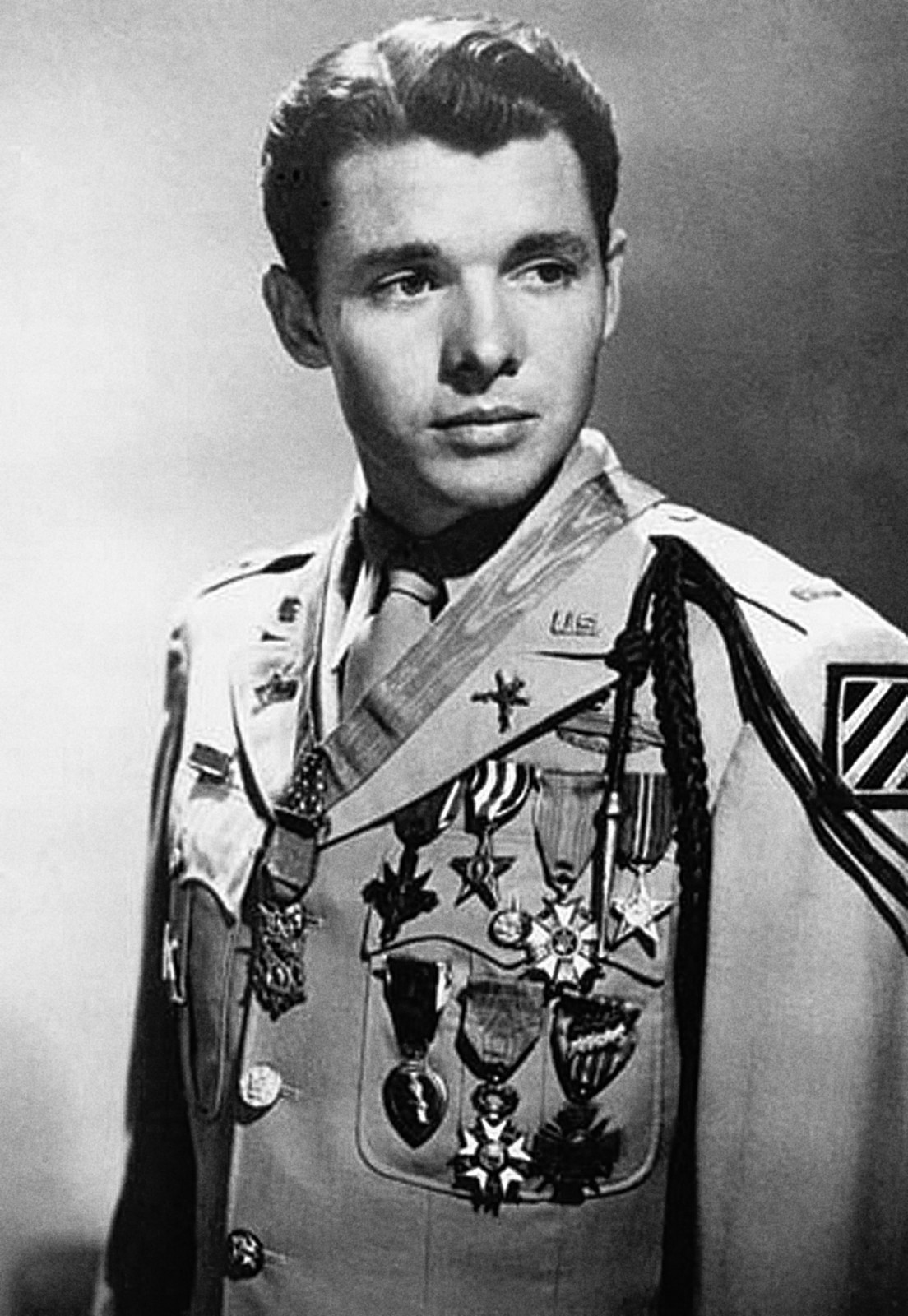
Audie Murphy

- May 1 – Glenda Farrell, American actress (b. 1904)
- May 5 – Violet Jessop, Argentine-born British RMS Titanic survivor (b. 1887)
- May 8 – Godfrey Huggins, 1st Viscount Malvern, English-born Rhodesian politician and physician, Prime Minister of Rhodesia (b. 1883)
- May 11 – Seán Lemass, 4th Taoiseach of Ireland (b. 1899)
- May 12 – Tor Johnson, Swedish wrestler and actor (b. 1903)
- May 19
  - Ogden Nash, American poet (b. 1902)
  - Earl Thomson, Canadian athlete, Olympic champion (1920) (b. 1895)
- May 27 – Chips Rafferty, Australian actor (b. 1909)
- May 28
  - Kim Iryeop, Korean writer, journalist, feminist activist, Buddhist nun (b. 1896)
  - Audie Murphy, American World War II hero and actor (b. 1925)
  - Jean Vilar, French stage actor (b. 1912)
- May 30 – Marcel Dupré, French composer (b. 1886)

=== June ===
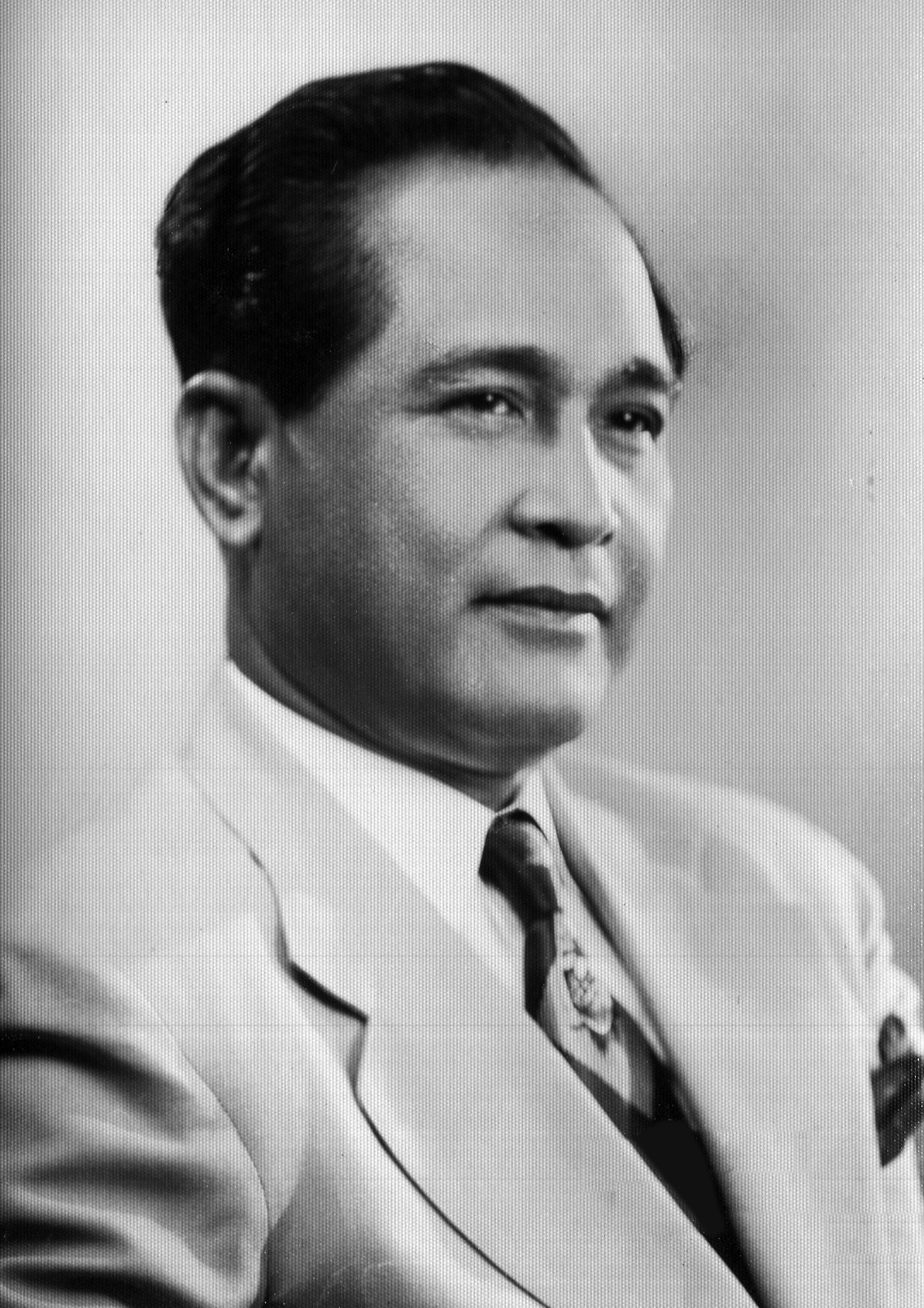
Carlos P. Garcia

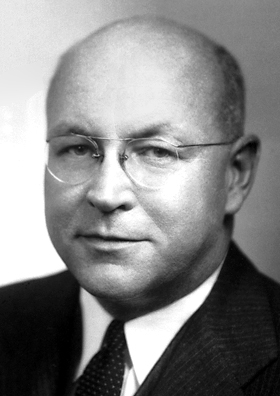
Wendell Meredith Stanley

- June 1 – Reinhold Niebuhr, American theologian (b. 1892)
- June 4 – György Lukács, Hungarian Marxist philosopher, aesthetician, literary historian, and critic (b. 1885)
- June 10 – Michael Rennie, English actor (b. 1909)
- June 14 – Carlos P. Garcia, 8th President of the Philippines (b. 1896)
- June 15 – Wendell Meredith Stanley, American chemist, Nobel Prize laureate (b. 1904)
- June 18
  - Libby Holman, American singer and actress (b. 1904)
  - Paul Karrer, Swiss chemist, Nobel Prize laureate (b. 1889)
- June 19 – Garfield Wood, American motorboat racer (b. 1880)
- June 25 – John Boyd Orr, 1st Baron Boyd-Orr, Scottish physician and biologist, recipient of the Nobel Peace Prize (b. 1880)
- June 26 – Inia Te Wiata, New Zealand Māori bass-baritone opera singer, film actor, whakairo (carver) and artist (b. 1915)
- June 29
  - Nestor Mesta Chayres, Mexican operatic tenor and bolero vocalist (b 1908)
  - Crew of Soyuz 11:
    - Georgy Dobrovolsky (b. 1928)
    - Viktor Patsayev (b. 1933)
    - Vladislav Volkov (b. 1935)
- June 30
  - Herbert Biberman, American screenwriter and film director (b. 1900)
  - Kenneth Slessor, Australian poet (b. 1901)

=== July ===
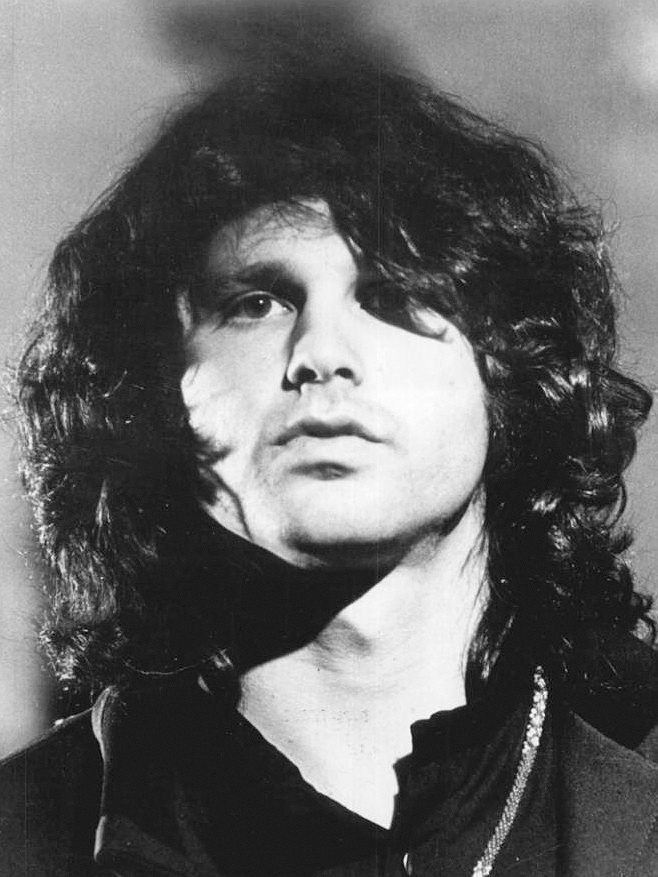
Jim Morrison

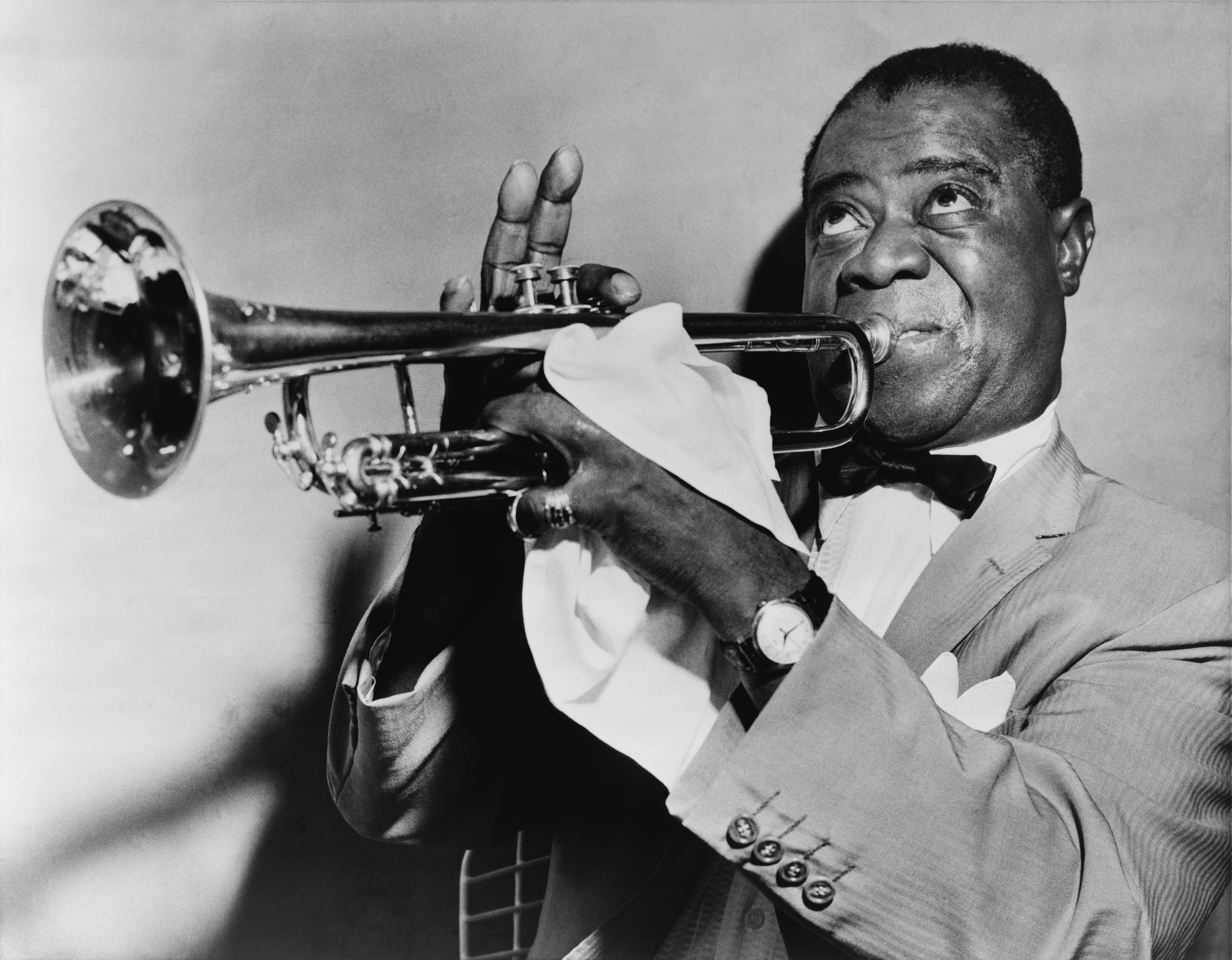
Louis Armstrong

- July 1
  - Sir Lawrence Bragg, English physicist, Nobel Prize laureate (b. 1890)
  - Learie Constantine, Baron Constantine, Trinidadian cricketer (b. 1901)
- July 3 – Jim Morrison, American singer (The Doors) (b. 1943)
- July 4
  - Sir Maurice Bowra, British critic and academic (b. 1898)
  - August Derleth, American author and anthologist (b. 1909)
  - Thomas C. Hart, American admiral and politician (b. 1877)
- July 6 – Louis Armstrong, African-American jazz trumpeter (b. 1901)
- July 7 – Ub Iwerks, American animator (b. 1901)
- July 13 – Michel Saint-Denis, French actor, theatre director, drama theorist and radio broadcaster (b. 1897)
- July 17 – Cliff Edwards, American actor (b. 1895)
- July 19 – John Jacob Astor, 1st Baron Astor of Hever, American-born British businessman (b. 1886)
- July 21 – Michael Somogyi, Hungarian-American biochemist (b. 1883)
- July 23
  - Van Heflin, American actor (b. 1908)
  - William Tubman, 19th president of Liberia (b. 1895)
- July 24 – Alan Rawsthorne, British Composer (b. 1905)
- July 26 – Diane Arbus, American photographer (b. 1923)

=== August ===
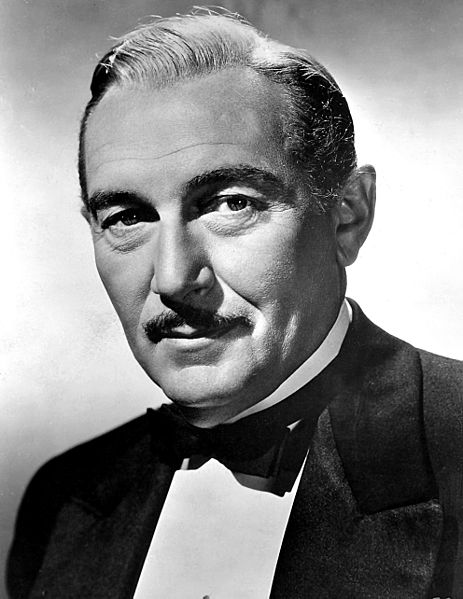
Paul Lukas

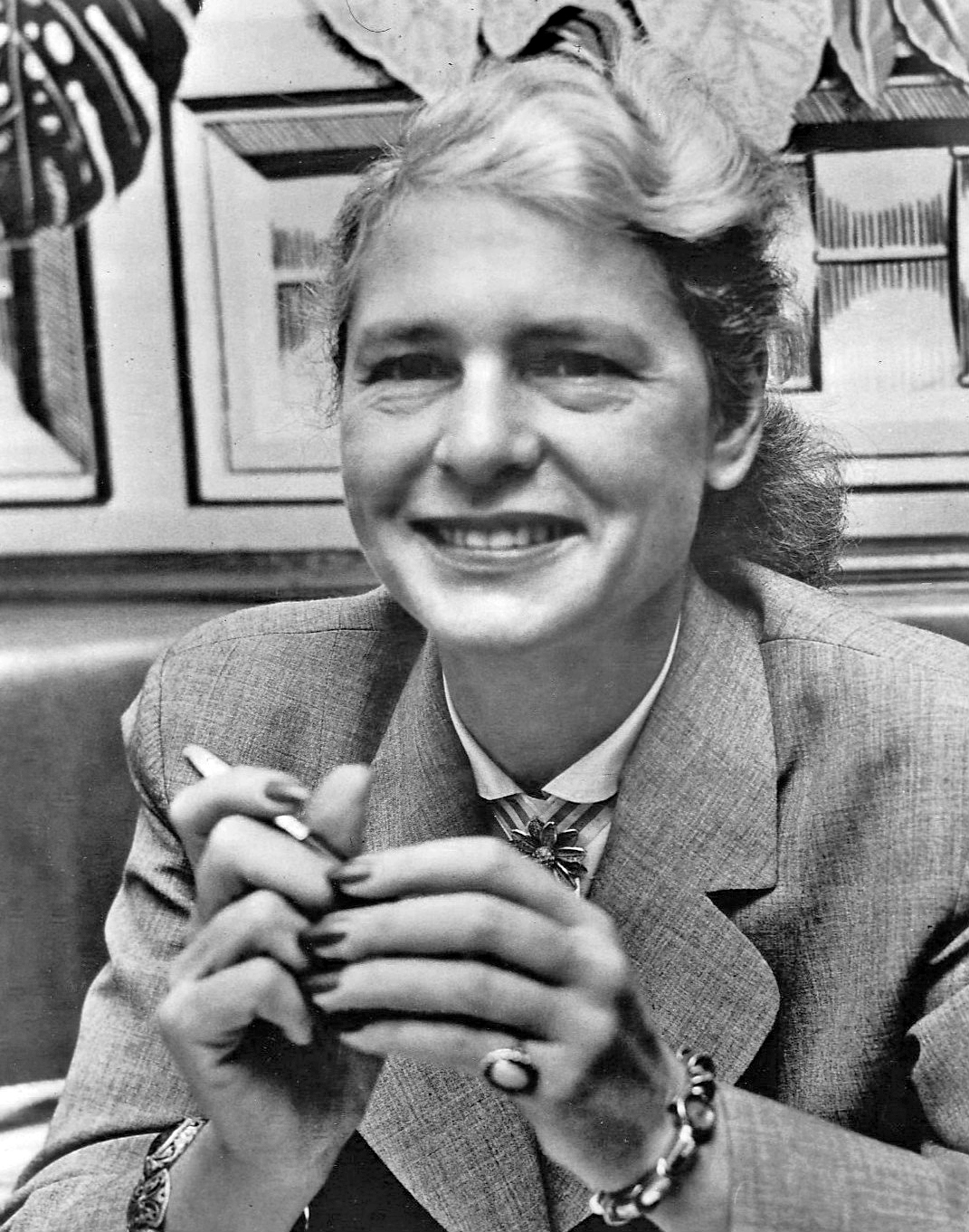
Margaret Bourke-White

- August 5 – Royal Rife, American inventor (b. 1888)
- August 11 – Sir John Cleland, Australian naturalist, microbiologist, mycologist and ornithologist (b. 1878)
- August 13
  - W. O. Bentley, English engineer and entrepreneur (b. 1888)
  - King Curtis, American saxophonist (b. 1934)
- August 15 – Paul Lukas, Hungarian-born American actor (b. 1894)
- August 17 – Wilhelm List, German field marshal (b. 1880)
- August 21 – George Jackson, American author (b. 1941)
- August 24 – Carl Blegen, American archaeologist (b. 1887)
- August 25 – Ted Lewis, American musician and entertainer (b. 1890)
- August 27
  - Margaret Bourke-White, American photographer (b. 1904)
  - Bennett Cerf, American publisher (b. 1898)
- August 28 – Geoffrey Lawrence, 1st Baron Oaksey, British judge during the Nuremberg trials after World War II (b. 1880)

=== September ===
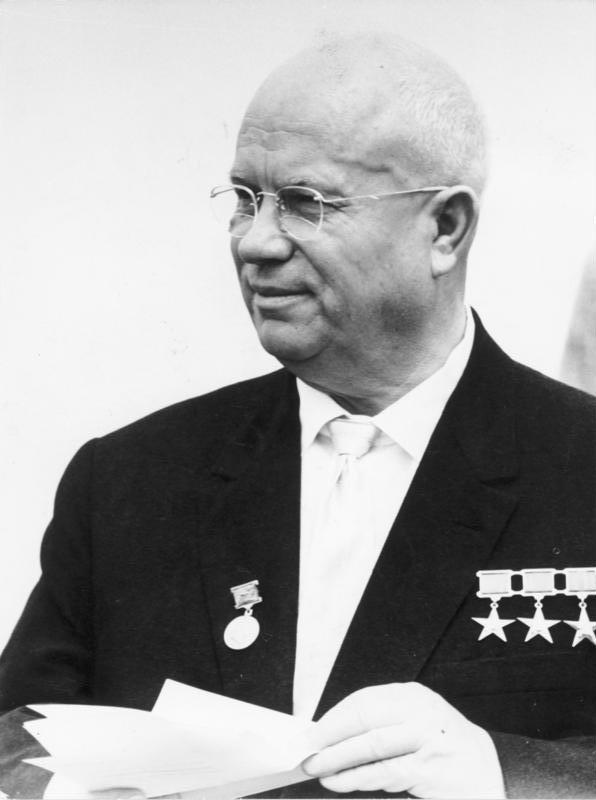
Nikita Khrushchev

- September 7 – Spring Byington, American actress (b. 1886)
- September 8 – Emmett Toppino, American Olympic athlete (b. 1909)
- September 10 – Pier Angeli, Italian actress (b. 1932)
- September 11
  - Bella Darvi, Polish actress (b. 1928)
  - Percy Helton, American actor (b. 1894)
  - Joe Jordan, American ragtime composer (b. 1882)
  - Nikita Khrushchev, Soviet leader (b. 1894)
- September 13 – Lin Biao, Chinese defense minister (b. 1907)
- September 14 – Tarasankar Bandyopadhyay, Bangladeshi novelist (b. 1898)
- September 19 – William F. Albright, American archeologist and Biblical scholar (b. 1891)
- September 20 – Giorgos Seferis, Greek writer, Nobel Prize laureate (b. 1900)
- September 21 – Bernardo Houssay, Argentine physiologist, Nobel Prize laureate (b. 1887)
- September 23
  - James Waddell Alexander II, American mathematician and topologist (b. 1888)
  - Billy Gilbert, American actor (b. 1894)
- September 25 – Hugo Black, American Supreme Court Justice (b. 1886)

=== October ===
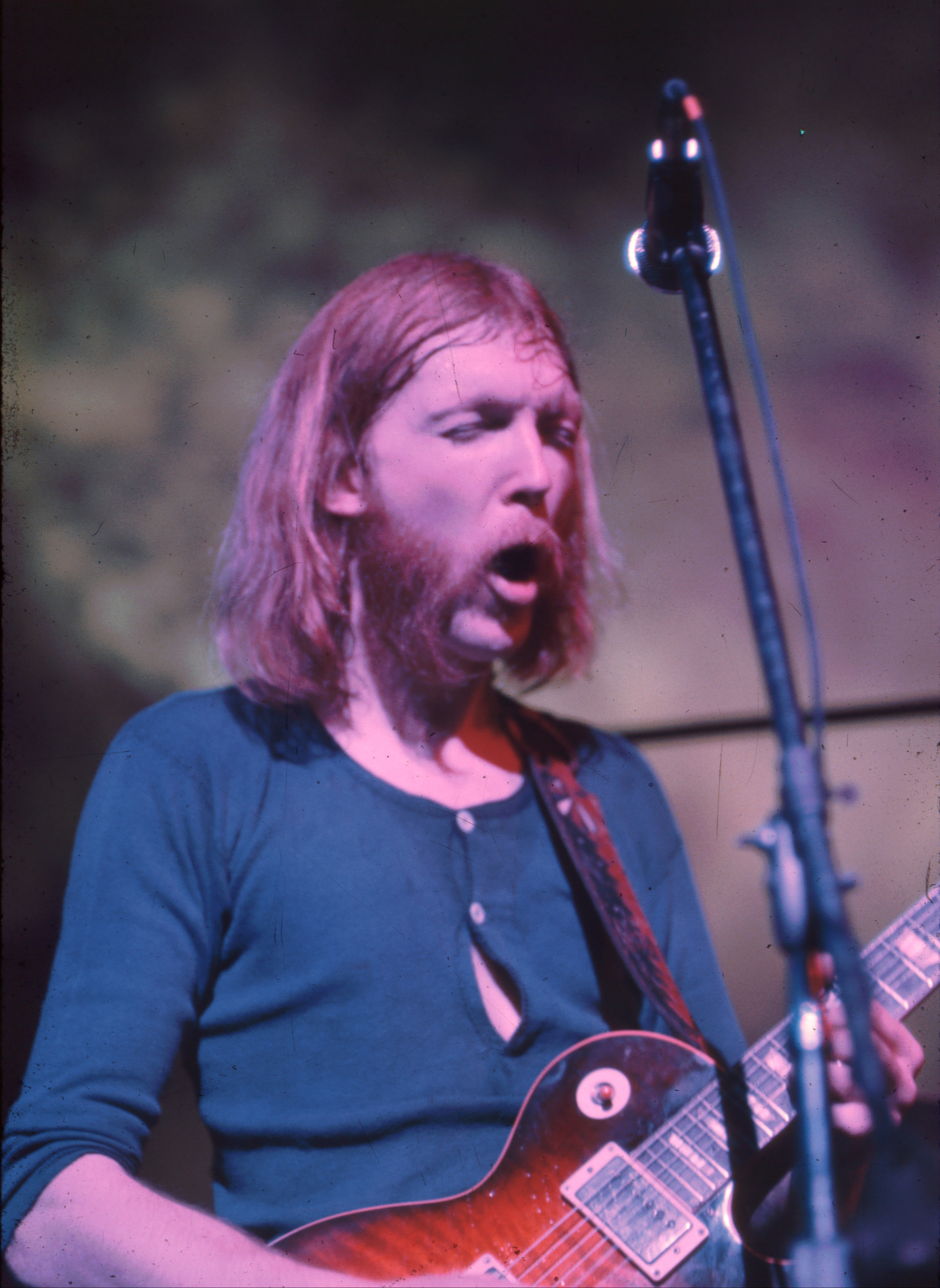
Duane Allman

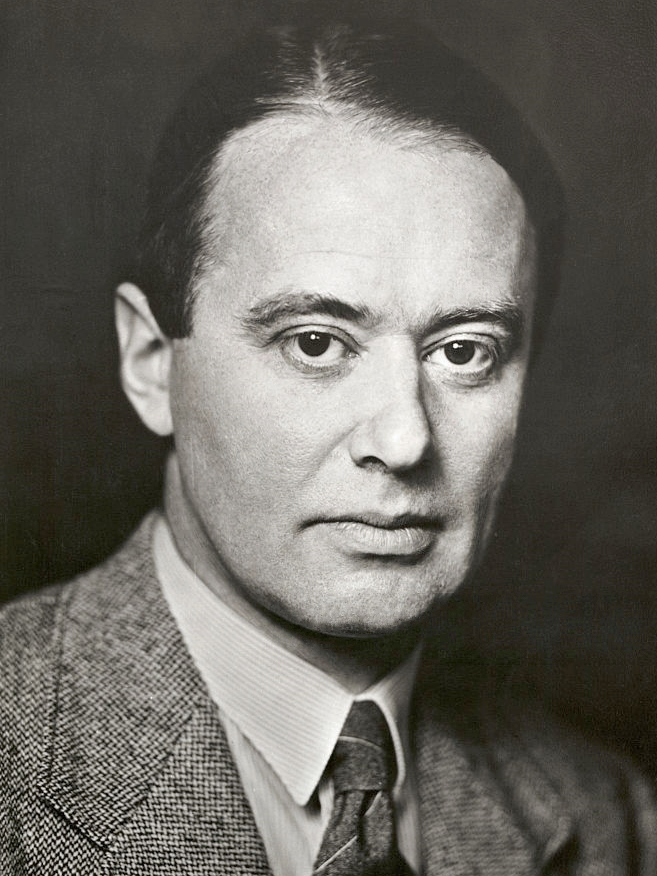
Arne Tiselius

- October 3 – Leah Baird, American actress (b. 1883)
- October 10 – Sir Cyril Burt, British educational psychologist (b. 1883)
- October 11 – Chester Conklin, American actor (b. 1886)
- October 12
  - Dean Acheson, 51st United States Secretary of State (b. 1893)
  - Gene Vincent, American singer (b. 1935)
- October 15 – Robert Accard (b. 1897)
- October 17 – Sergey Kavtaradze, Soviet politician and diplomat (b. 1885)
- October 19 – Betty Bronson, American actress (b. 1906)
- October 21
  - Raymond Hatton, American actor (b. 1887)
  - Naoya Shiga, Japanese writer (b. 1883)
- October 24 – Carl Ruggles, American composer (b. 1876)
- October 29
  - Duane Allman, American rock guitarist, co-founder and leader of the Allman Brothers Band (b. 1946)
  - Arne Tiselius, Swedish chemist, Nobel Prize laureate (b. 1902)

=== November ===
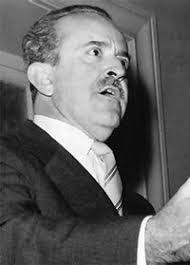
Guillermo León Valencia

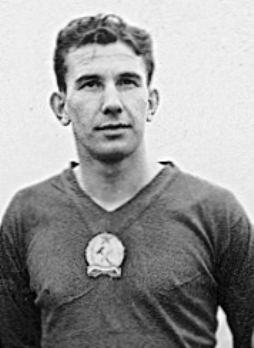
József Zakariás

- November 1 – Gertrud von Le Fort, German writer of novels, poems and essays (b. 1876)
- November 2 – Martha Vickers, American actress (b. 1925)
- November 4
  - Ann Pennington, American actress and dancer (b. 1893)
  - Guillermo León Valencia, 21st President of Colombia (b. 1909)
- November 9 – Maude Fealy, American stage and film actor (b. 1883)
- November 10 – Walter Van Tilburg Clark, American novelist (b. 1909)
- November 11 – A. P. Herbert, English humorist, novelist and politician (b. 1890)
- November 14 – Hanna Neumann, German mathematician (b. 1914)
- November 16 – Edie Sedgwick, American actress and model (b. 1943)
- November 17 – Dame Gladys Cooper, British actress (b. 1888)
- November 22 – József Zakariás, Hungarian footballer and manager (b. 1924)
- November 23 – Ryūnosuke Kusaka, Japanese admiral (b. 1893)
- November 25 – Hank Mann, American comedic actor (b. 1887)
- November 26 – James Alberione, Italian Roman Catholic priest and blessed (b. 1884)
- November 28
  - Wasfi Tal, three-time prime minister of Jordan (b. 1919)
  - Sir Grantley Herbert Adams, 1st Premier of Barbados (b. 1898)
- November 29 – Edith Tolkien, English wife of, and inspiration for, J. R. R. Tolkien (b. 1889)
- November 30 – Ilie Crețulescu, Romanian general (b. 1889)

=== December ===
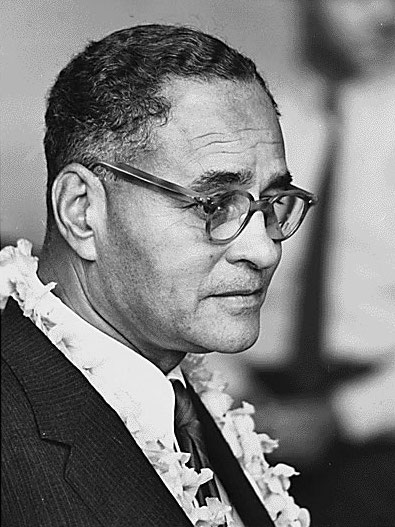
Ralph Bunche

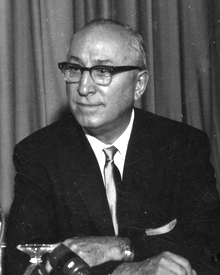
Roy O. Disney

- December 2 – Sir Derwent Hall Caine, English actor (b. 1891)
- December 5 – John Langdon-Davies, British writer (b. 1897)
- December 6 – Mathilde Kschessinska, Russian ballerina (b. 1872)
- December 9 – Ralph Bunche, African-American diplomat, recipient of the Nobel Peace Prize (b. 1904)
- December 10
  - Gotthard Heinrici, German general (b. 1886)
  - Taha el-Fashni, Egyptian Quran reciter (b. 1900)
- December 12
  - Alan Morton, Scottish footballer (b. 1893)
  - David Sarnoff, American radio and television pioneer (b. 1891)
- December 15 – Paul Lévy, French mathematician (b. 1886)
- December 16 - Arun Khetarpal, Indian Military Officer
- December 18
  - Bobby Jones, American golfer (b. 1902)
  - Diana Lynn, American actress (b. 1926)
- December 20 – Roy O. Disney, American studio executive (b. 1893)
- December 21 – Ásta Sigurðardóttir, Icelandic writer and visual artist (b. 1930)
- December 22 – Godfried Bomans, Dutch writer (b. 1913)
- December 24 – Maria Koepcke, German ornithologist (b. 1924)
- December 26 – Robert Lowery, American actor (b. 1913)
- December 28 – Max Steiner, Austrian-born film composer (b. 1888)
- December 29 – John Marshall Harlan II, Associate Justice of the Supreme Court of the United States (b. 1899)
- December 30
  - Jo Cals, Dutch politician and jurist, Prime Minister of the Netherlands (1965–1966) (b. 1914)
  - Dorothy Comingore, American actress (b. 1913)
- December 31
  - Pete Duel, American actor (b. 1940)
  - Marin Sais, American film actress (b. 1890)

=== Date unknown ===
- Olivér Pittner, Hungarian painter (b. 1911)

== Nobel Prizes ==

- Physics – Dennis Gabor
- Chemistry – Gerhard Herzberg
- Medicine – Earl W. Sutherland, Jr
- Literature – Pablo Neruda
- Peace – Willy Brandt
- Economics – Simon Kuznets
