= Council of Protestants in Guiding and Scouting =

- Country: International
- Chairperson: vacant
- Vice-Chairperson: Charles-Olivier Yapi
- Website cpgs.info

The Council of Protestants in Guiding and Scouting (CPGS) is an autonomous, international body committed to promoting and supporting Protestant Scout and Guide associations and to be a link between the Scout movement and Protestant churches based on the definition of the World Council of Churches (WCC).

It enjoys consultative status with the World Scout Committee and forms the World Scout Inter-religious Forum (WSIF) together with the International Link of Orthodox Christian Scouts, International Catholic Conference of Scouting, International Union of Muslim Scouts, International Forum of Jewish Scouts, Won-Buddhism Scout and World Buddhist Scout Brotherhood.

== History ==
The CPGS was founded as Conference on Christianity in Guiding and Scouting (CCGS) in 1965. In 2006, it was renamed to Council of Protestants in Guiding and Scouting reflecting a change of policy within the World Organization of the Scout Movement.

== Members ==
=== Current members ===
The members of the CPGS are:

- Argentina: Scouts de Argentina, Comisión Pastoral Scout Cristiano Evangélica
- Benin: Scoutisme Béninois
- Brazil: União dos Escoteiros do Brasil (observer)
- Cameroon: Les Scouts du Cameroun
- Democratic Republic of the Congo: Fédération des Scouts de la République démocratique du Congo (observer)
- Finland: Suomen Partiolaiset - Finlands Scouter ry
- France: Eclaireuses et Eclaireurs Unionistes de France
- Gabon: Éclaireuses et Éclaireurs Unionistes Unionistes du Gabon
- Guinea: Association Nationale des Scouts de Guinée
- Guinea-Bissau: Escuteiros da Guiné-Bissau
- Hungary: ICHTHÜSZ – Protestant unit of the Hungarian Scout Association
- Ivory Coast:
  - Éclaireuses et Éclaireurs Unionistes de Côte d'Ivoire
  - Éclaireuses et Éclaireurs Evangéliques de Côte d’Ivoire
  - Éclaireuses et Éclaireurs de Côte d'Ivoire (associate member)
  - Fédération Ivoirienne du Scoutisme (observer)
- Madagascar:
  - Tily eto Madagasikara (observer)
  - Firaisan'ny Skotisma eto Madagasikara (observer)

=== Former members ===
- Germany: Verband Christlicher Pfadfinder*innen, founding member, membership terminated in 2024

== See also ==
- Religion in Scouting
