= Buchanan Point =

Headland of Antarctica

- Headland
- Coordinates: 60°43′S 44°28′W
- Location: Laurie Island

Buchanan Point is a headland 5 km (3.1 mi) north-west of Cape Dundas and 2 km (1.2 mi) south-east of Mackintosh Cove, at the north-eastern end of Laurie Island in the South Orkney Islands of Antarctica.

== Etymology ==
In 1903 the Scottish National Antarctic Expedition under William Speirs Bruce applied the name "Cape Buchanan", after J.Y. Buchanan, a member of the Challenger Expedition of 1872–76, to the prominent cape 6 km (3.7 mi) north-westward, which had been named "Cape Valavielle" in 1838 by a French expedition under Captain Jules Dumont d'Urville. At the same time, the French name (in English form but misspelled "Cape Vallavielle") was transferred to the point now described. The name Cape Valavielle has been retained for the prominent cape, as applied by d'Urville, on the basis of priority and wide usage. For the sake of historical continuity, the UK Antarctic Place-Names Committee in 1954 recommended that the name Buchanan Point be applied to the point now described.

== Important Bird Area ==
The site has been identified as an Important Bird Area (IBA) by BirdLife International because it supports a breeding colony of about 10,000 pairs of chinstrap penguins.
