= Woogie Island =

Island in Antarctica

- Location within Antarctica

Geography
- Location: Antarctica
- Coordinates: 64°49′25″S 63°29′55″W

Administration
- Administered under the Antarctic Treaty System

Demographics
- Population: Uninhabited

Woogie Island is a small low-lying island in the entrance to Port Lockroy, about 330 meters northwest of Goudier Island, Wiencke Island, Palmer Archipelago. It was roughly charted by Jean-Baptiste Charcot in 1904, and surveyed and originally named by Operation Tabarin in 1944.
