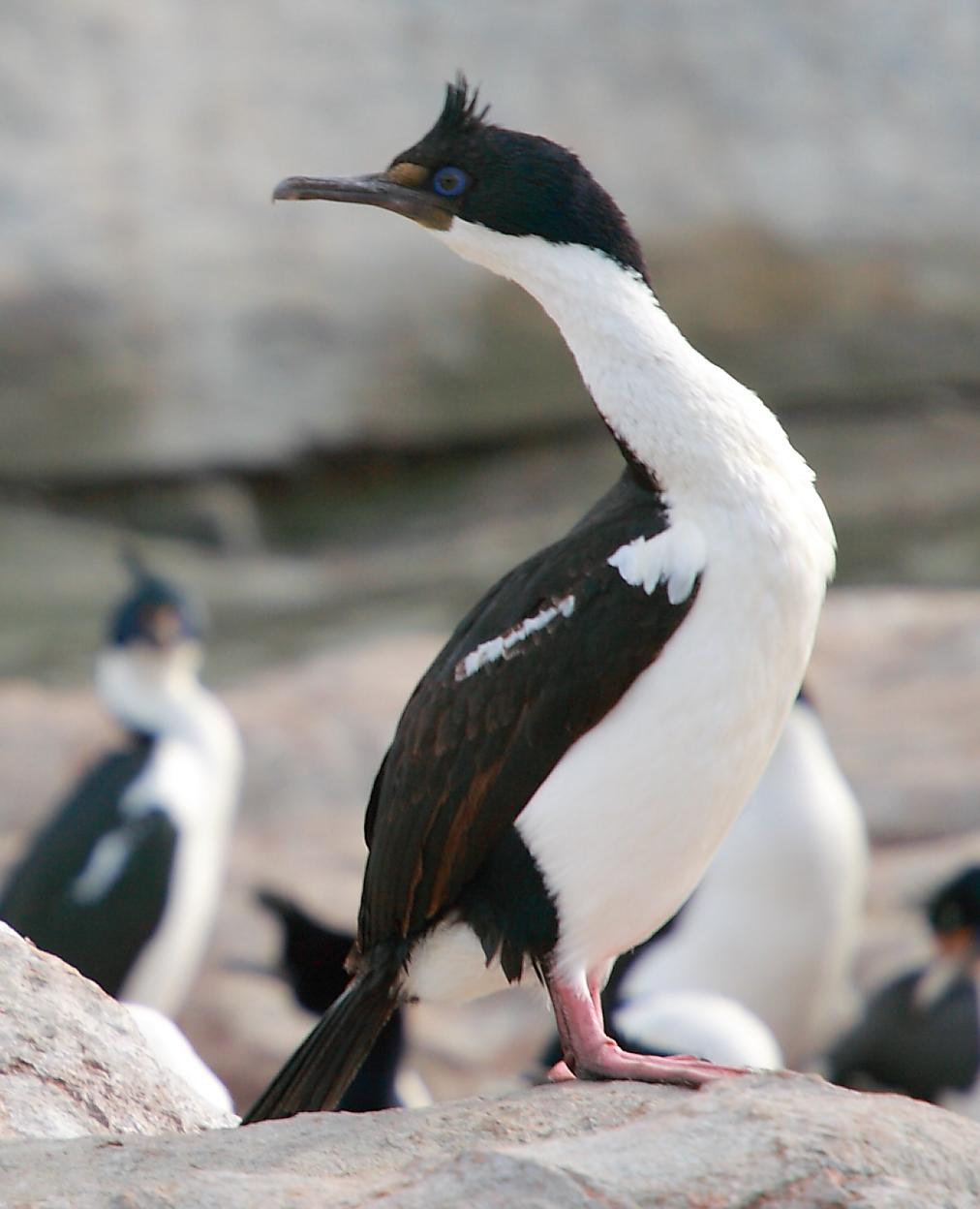
- Beagle Channel, southern Argentina

Conservation status
- Least Concern (IUCN 3.1)

Scientific classification
- Kingdom: Animalia
- Phylum: Chordata
- Class: Aves
- Order: Suliformes
- Family: Phalacrocoracidae
- Genus: Leucocarbo
- Species: L. atriceps

Binomial name
- Leucocarbo atriceps (King, PP, 1828)

Synonyms
- Phalacrocorax albiventer; Phalacrocorax atriceps

= Imperial shag =

Species of bird

The imperial shag or imperial cormorant (Leucocarbo atriceps) is a black-and-white cormorant native to southern South America, islands of the Subantarctic, and the Antarctic Peninsula, primarily in rocky coastal regions, but locally also at large inland lakes. Some taxonomic authorities, including the International Ornithologists' Union, place it in the genus Leucocarbo, others in the genus Phalacrocorax. It is also known as the blue-eyed shag, blue-eyed cormorant and by many other names, and is one of a larger group of cormorants called blue-eyed shags. The taxonomy is complex, and several types are treated as either subspecies or separate species.

== Taxonomy ==
The imperial shag was formally described in 1828 by the Royal Navy officer Phillip Parker King based on a specimen that he had collected in the Strait of Magellan of southern Chile. He placed the species in the genus Phalacrocorax and coined the binomial name Phalacrocorax atriceps, (Note: The holotype is an immature specimen in the Natural History Museum in Tring.) where the specific epithet combines the Latin ater meaning "black" with -ceps meaning "-capped" or "-headed". The imperial shag was formerly usually retained in the genus Phalacrocorax, but has also sometimes been placed in its own genus Notocarbo. Based on a comprehensive molecular phylogeny of the cormorant family Phalacrocoracidae by Martyn Kennedy and Hamish Spencer that was published in 2014, the imperial shag is now one of nine species placed in the genus Leucocarbo that had been introduced by the French naturalist Charles Lucien Bonaparte in 1856.

Eight subspecies are recognised:

- L. a. atriceps (King, PP, 1828) – islands and coasts of south-central Chile and Argentina southward to Cape Horn
- L. a. albiventer (Lesson, RP, 1831) – King shag – Falkland Islands (Note: The validity of albiventer is questionable, and some authorities consider it only a black-cheeked morph of atriceps (sensu stricto). This black-cheeked type occurs together with "normal" white-cheeked atriceps at some localities in southern mainland South America. There are no known behavioral isolating mechanism between the two and hybrids do occur.)
- L. a. georgianus (Lönnberg, E, 1906) – South Georgia shag – South Georgia and the South Sandwich Islands, and South Orkney Islands
- L. a. melanogenis (Blyth, E, 1860) – Crozet shag – Prince Edward, Marion, and Crozet islands (southern Indian Ocean, southeast of South Africa)
- L. a. bransfieldensis (Murphy, RC, 1936) – Antarctic shag – South Shetland Islands and Antarctic Peninsula
- L. a. verrucosus (Cabanis, JL, 1875) – Kerguelen shag – Kerguelen Islands (southern Indian Ocean)
- L. a. nivalis (Falla, RA, 1937) – Heard Island shag – Heard Island (southern Indian Ocean)
- L. a. purpurascens (Brandt, JF, 1837) – Macquarie shag – Macquarie Island and adjacent Bishop and Clerk Rocks (southeast of Australia)

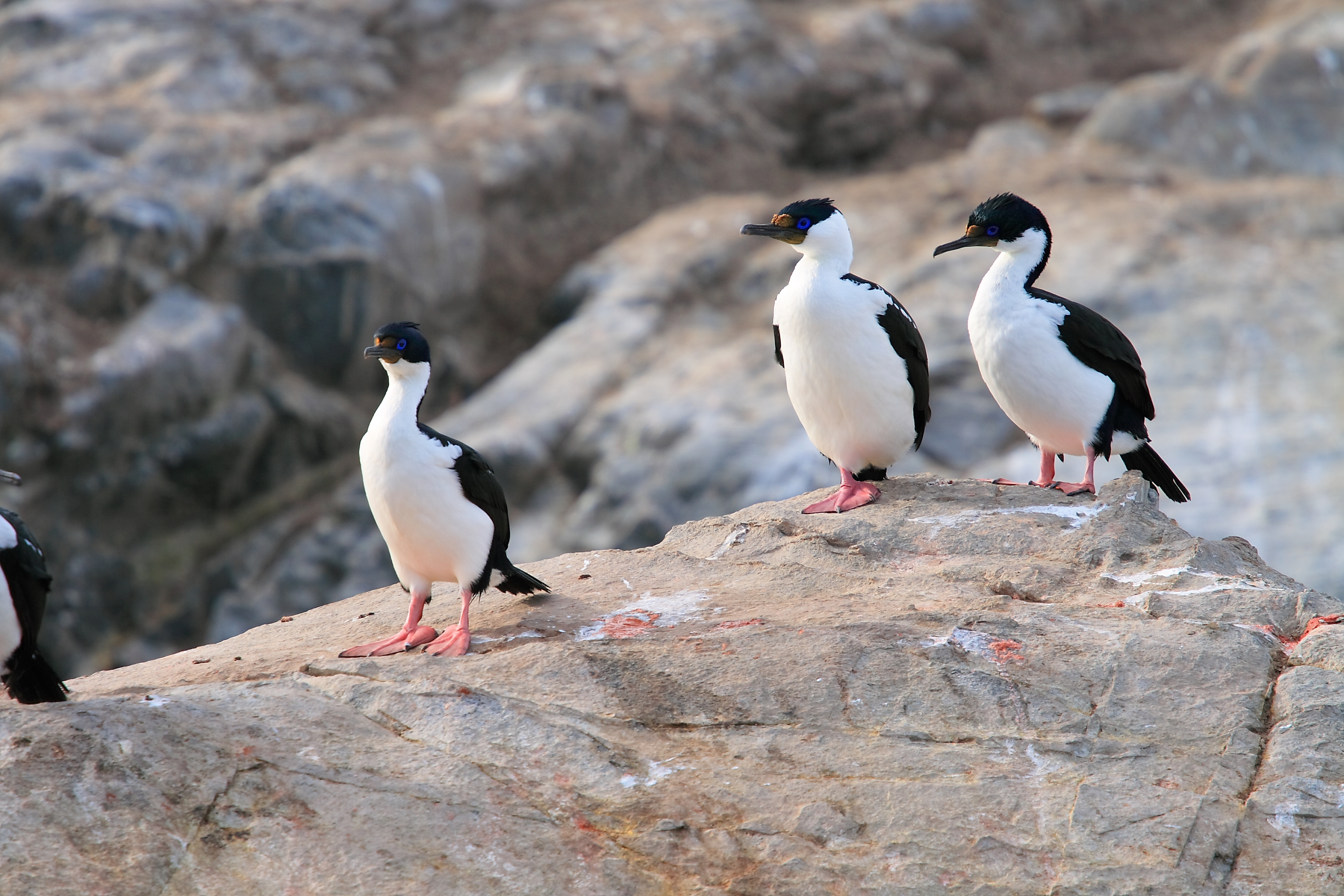
A white-cheeked L. (a.) atriceps with black-cheeked L. (a.) albiventer on either side. Beagle Channel, Argentina

While some authorities consider all of the above — except albiventer — as separate species, others consider all as subspecies of a single species (as done in this article). Alternatively, some recognize two species, the white-cheeked L. atriceps (with subspecies bransfieldensis, nivalis and georgianus) and the black-cheeked L. albiventer (with subspecies melanogenis and purpurascens), or it has been suggested that three species should be recognized: L. atriceps (including albiventer), L. georgianus (with subspecies bransfieldensis and nivalis), and L. melanogenis (with subspecies purpurascens and possibly verrucosus, though the latter is more distinctive, and most consider it a separate species, the Kerguelen shag).

All these taxa are now treated as subspecies of the imperial shag based on a molecular phylogenetic study by Nicolas Rawlence and collaborators that was published in 2022. The authors found that despite their sedentary behaviour and the wide separation between the breeding colonies on the subantarctic islands, the genetic differences are small suggesting a circumpolar dispersal from South America after the Last Glacial Maximum around 21 thousand years ago.

== Description ==
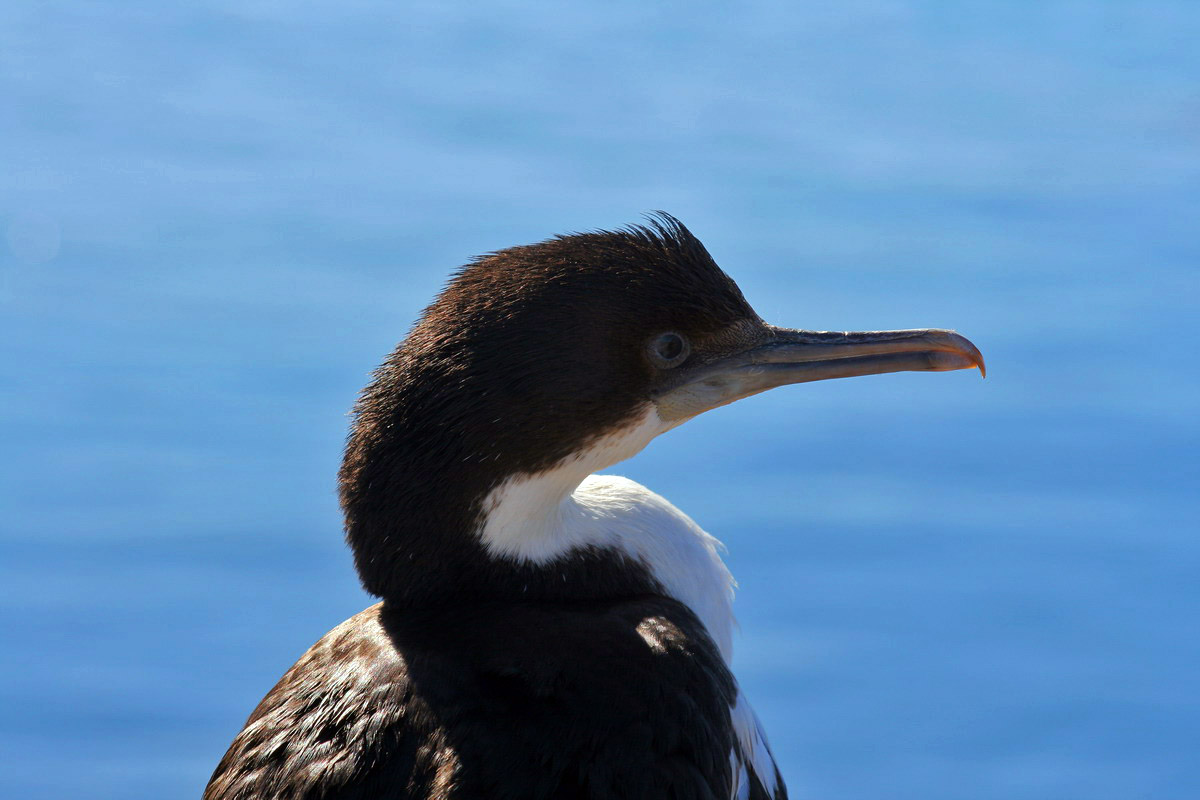
An immature L. (a.) albiventer in Patagonia, Argentina

The imperial shag has a total length of 70–79 cm (28–31 in) and weighs 1.8–3.5 kg (4.0–7.7 lb), with males usually larger than females. It is endowed with glossy black feathers covering most of its body, with a white belly and neck. It possesses a distinctive ring of blue skin around its eyes, an orange-yellow nasal knob, pinkish legs and feet, and an erectile black crest. During the non-breeding season, adults lack the crest, have a duller facial area, and less or no white to the back and wings. It has a serrated bill used for catching fish.

The group varies primarily in the amount of white on the cheeks/ear-coverts, wing-coverts and back. Most taxa have white cheeks and ear-coverts, but these are black in albiventer, purpurascens and melanogenis. Chicks are uniform brownish, and immatures are brownish and white (instead of black and white), have dull facial skin, and lack the orange-yellow nasal knob and blue eye-ring.

== Behavior ==
=== Breeding ===
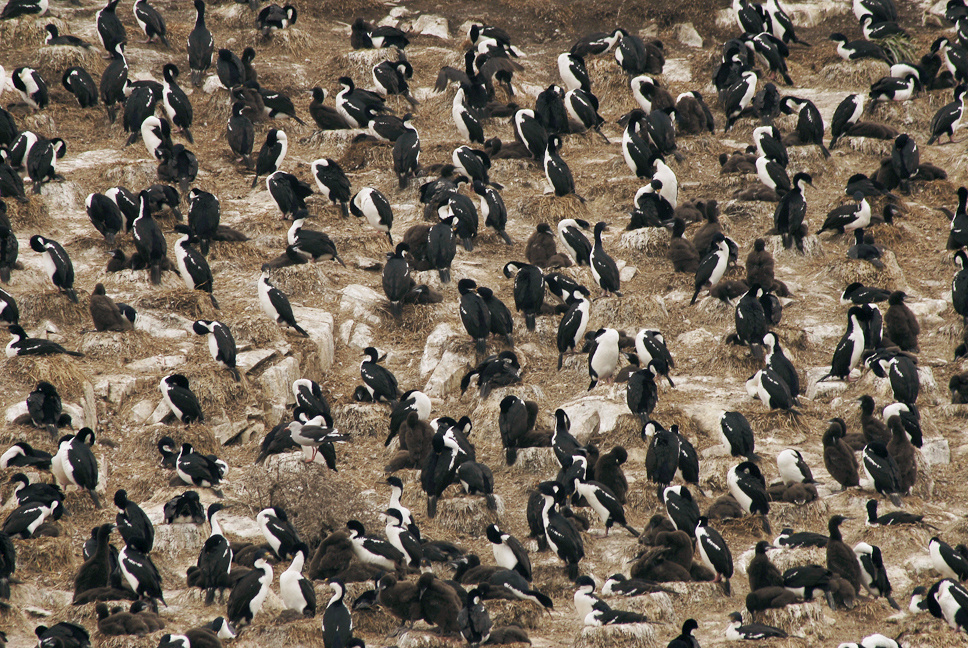
A large colony of L. (a.) albiventer at the Beagle Channel, Argentina. Notice the numerous all-brownish chicks.

This is a colonial, monogamous species. The colonies are usually relatively small, but some consist of hundreds of pairs and are often shared with other seabirds such as rock shags, southern rockhopper penguins and black-browed albatrosses. Up to five eggs (usually two or three) are placed in a nest made of seaweed and grass, and cemented together with mud and excrement. The eggs usually hatch in about five weeks, and are brooded by both parents. Many chicks and eggs are lost to predators such as skuas and sheathbills.

=== Feeding ===
The diet of this species consists of small benthic fish, crustaceans, polychaetes, gastropods and octopuses. They primarily feed on fish, especially Argentine anchoita,. Mean diving depth is almost 25 m (82 ft), and they have been filmed diving as deep as 60 m (200 ft) to forage on the sea floor. Most feeding takes place in inshore regions, but at least some populations will travel some distance from the shore to fish.

== Conservation status ==
Overall this species is not considered threatened and is consequently listed as Least Concern by BirdLife International and IUCN. Most subspecies are relatively common, with estimates of over 10,000 pairs of each.

== Gallery ==
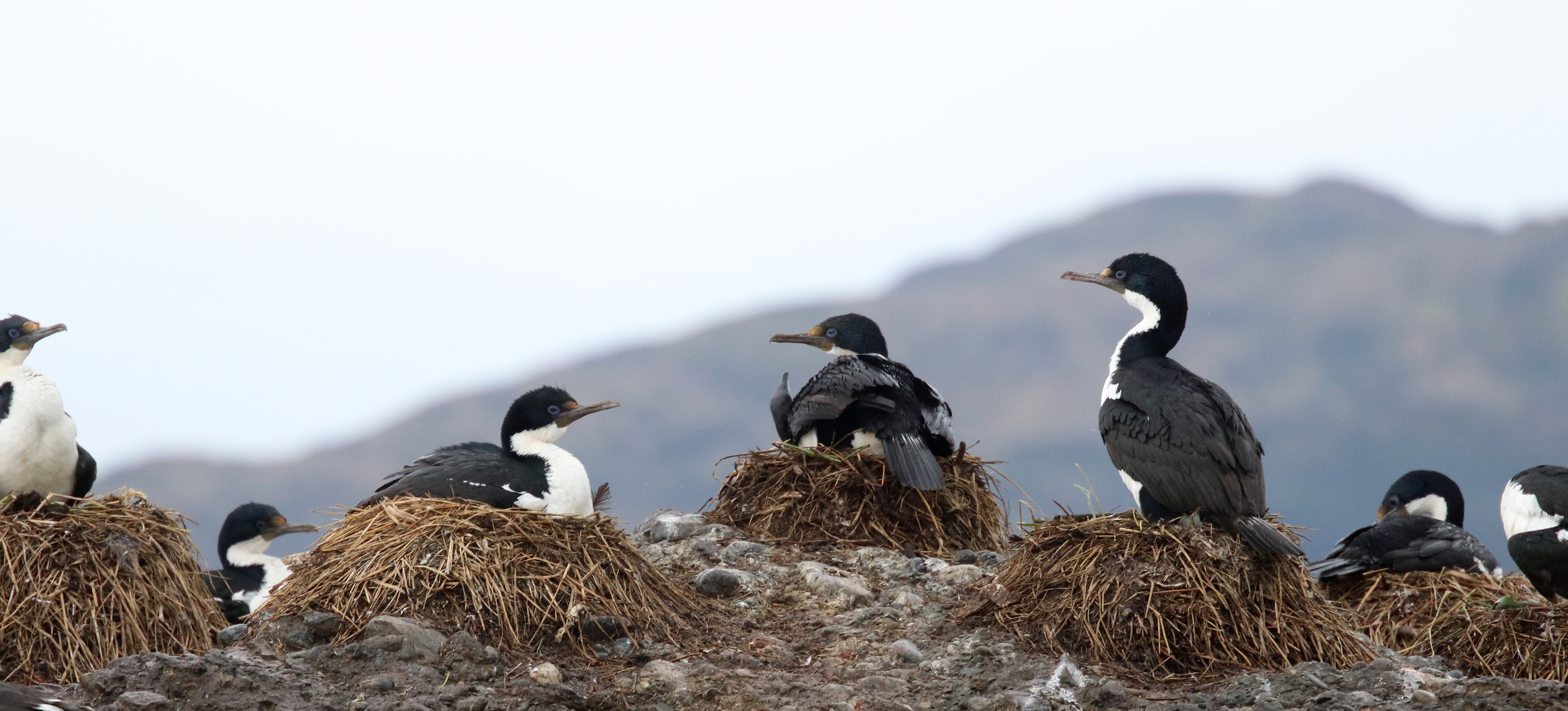
Nesting near Tucker Islets, Patagonia

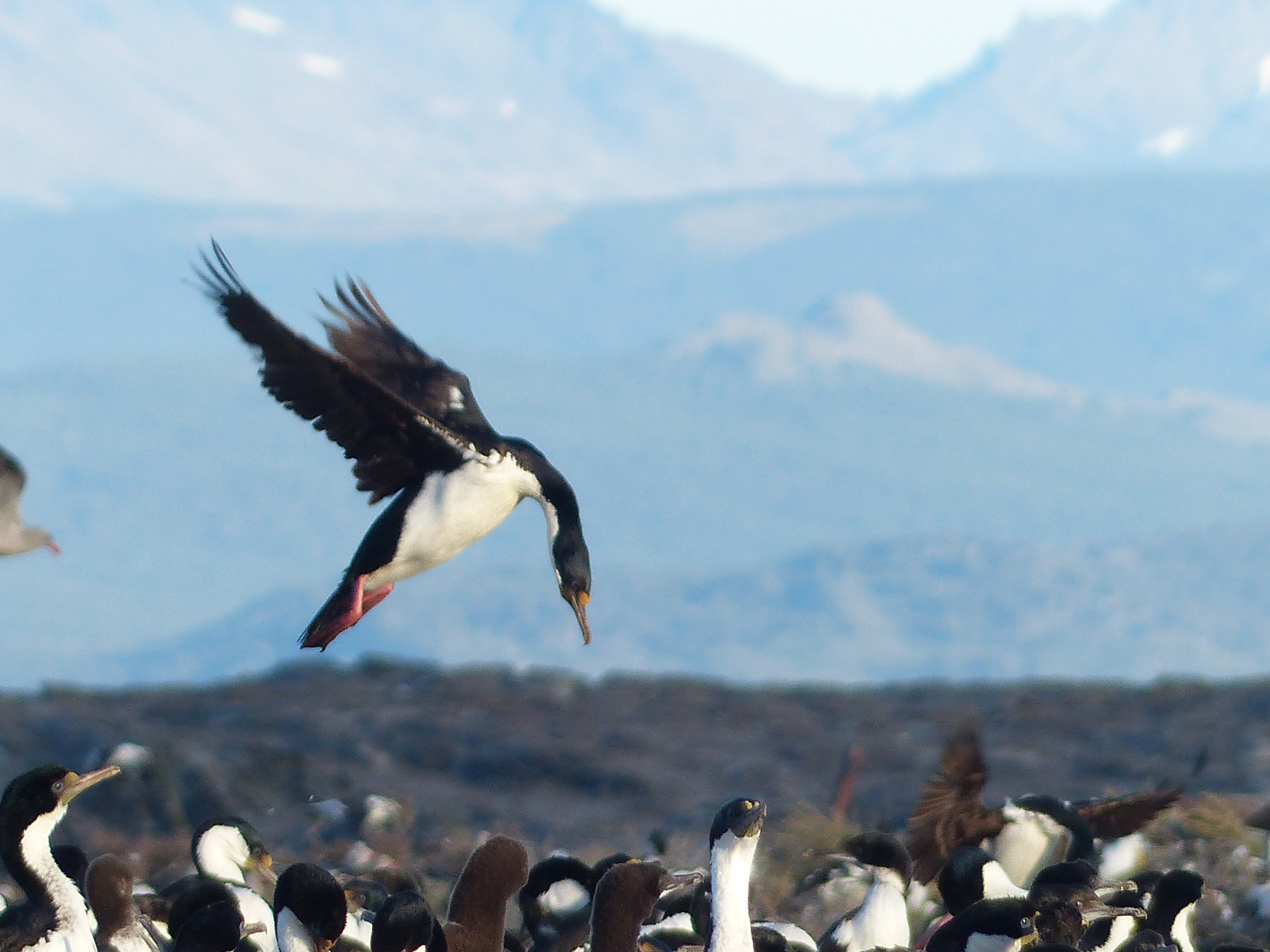
Landing on an island in the Beagle Channel, Argentina

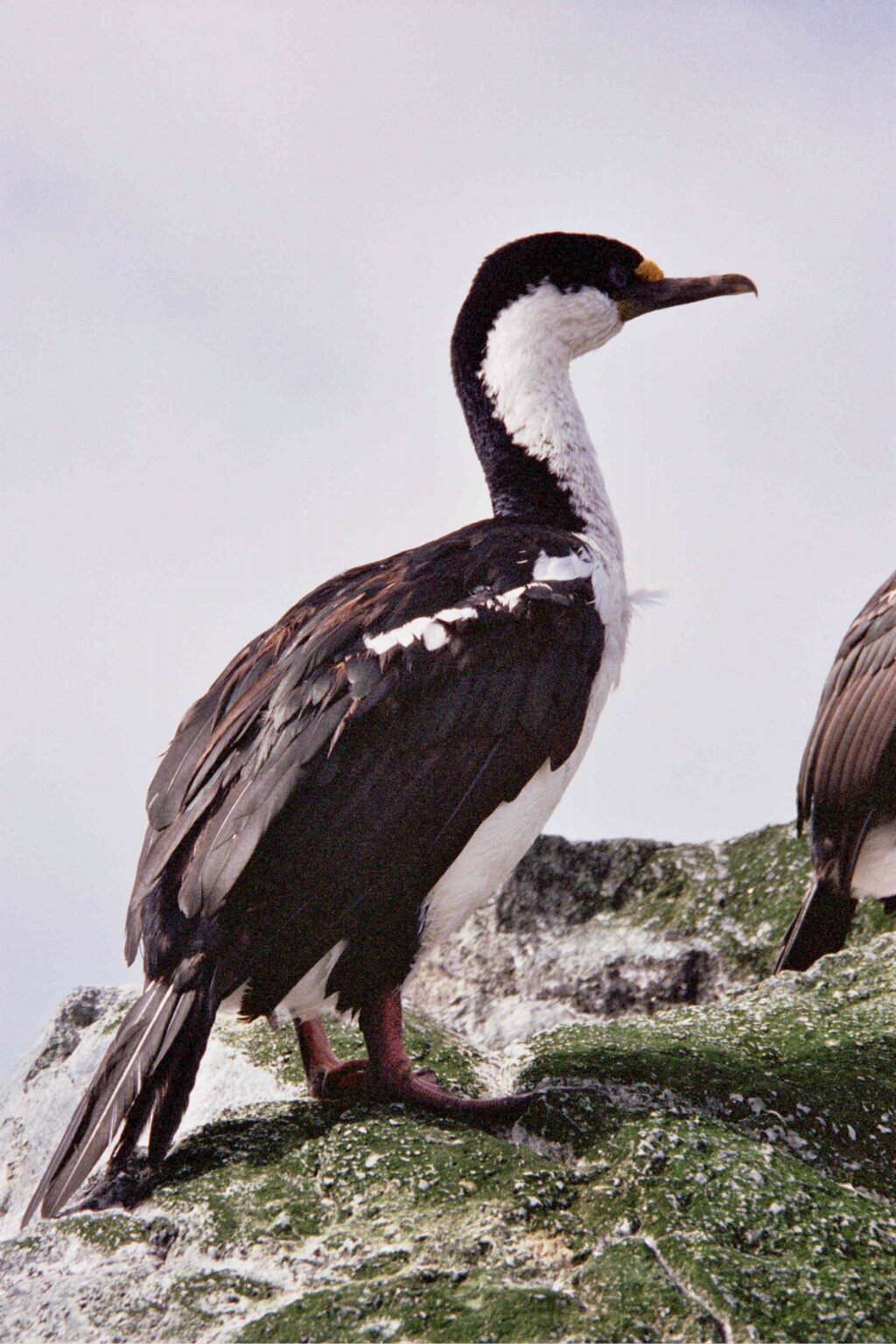
Macquarie shag (L. a. purpurascens) on Macquarie Island

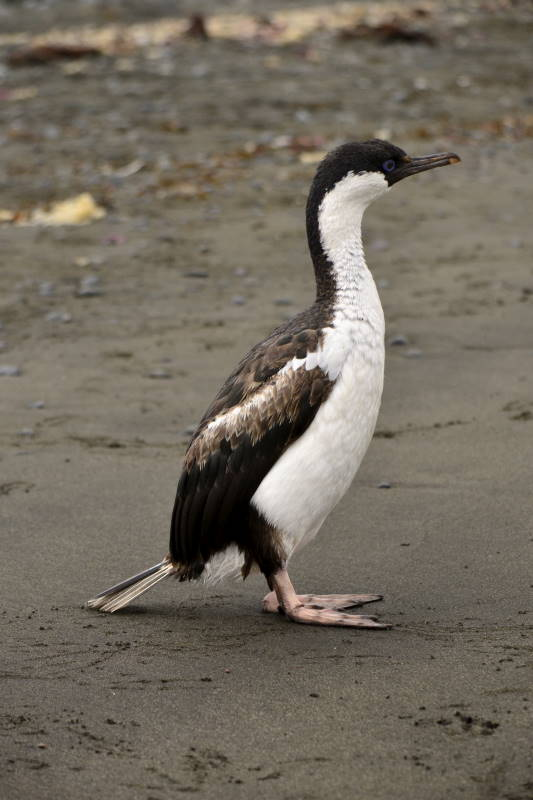
Antarctic shag (L. a. bransfieldensis) on Tower Island off the Antarctic Peninsula

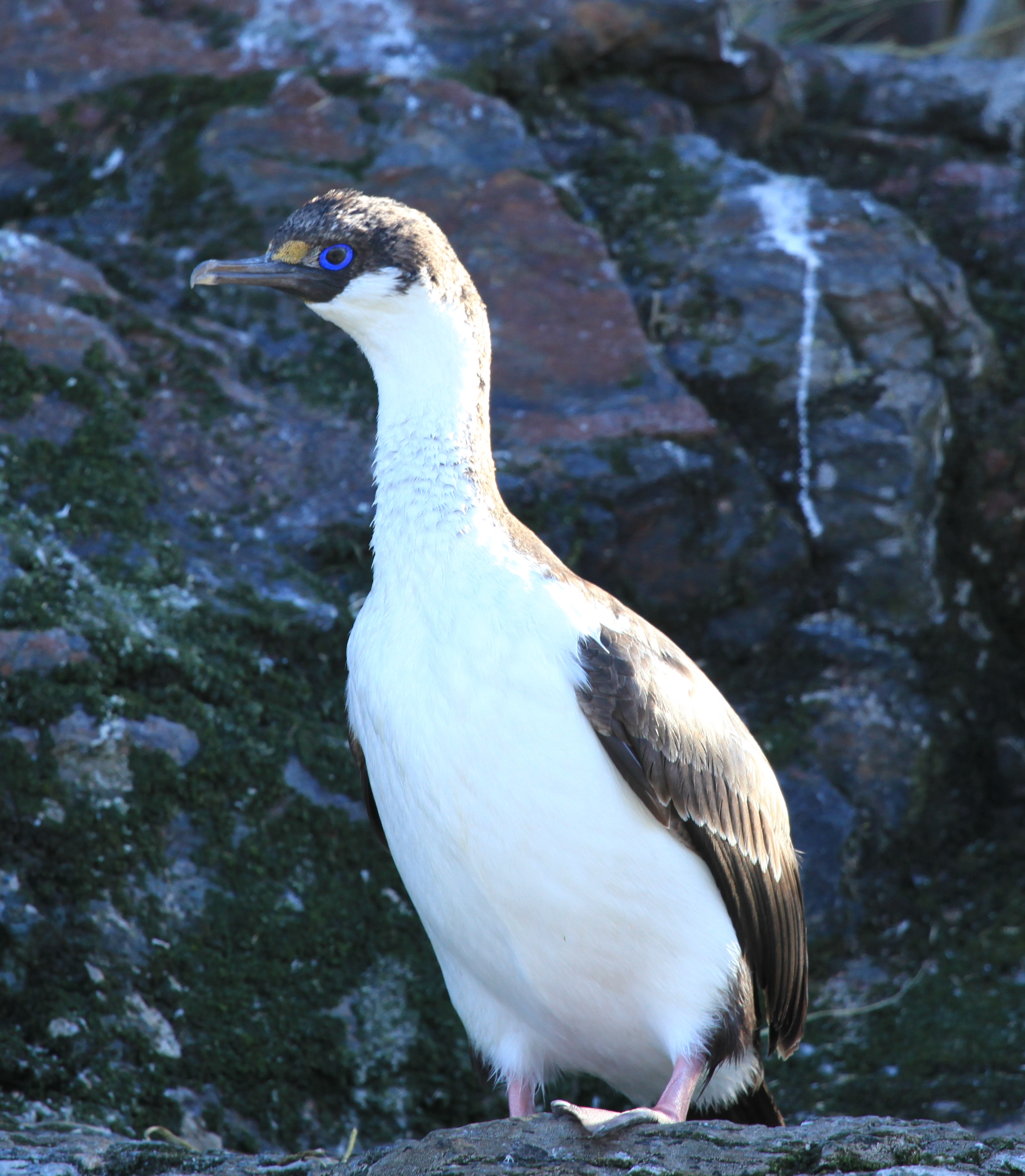
South Georgia shag (L. a. georgianus) on South Georgia

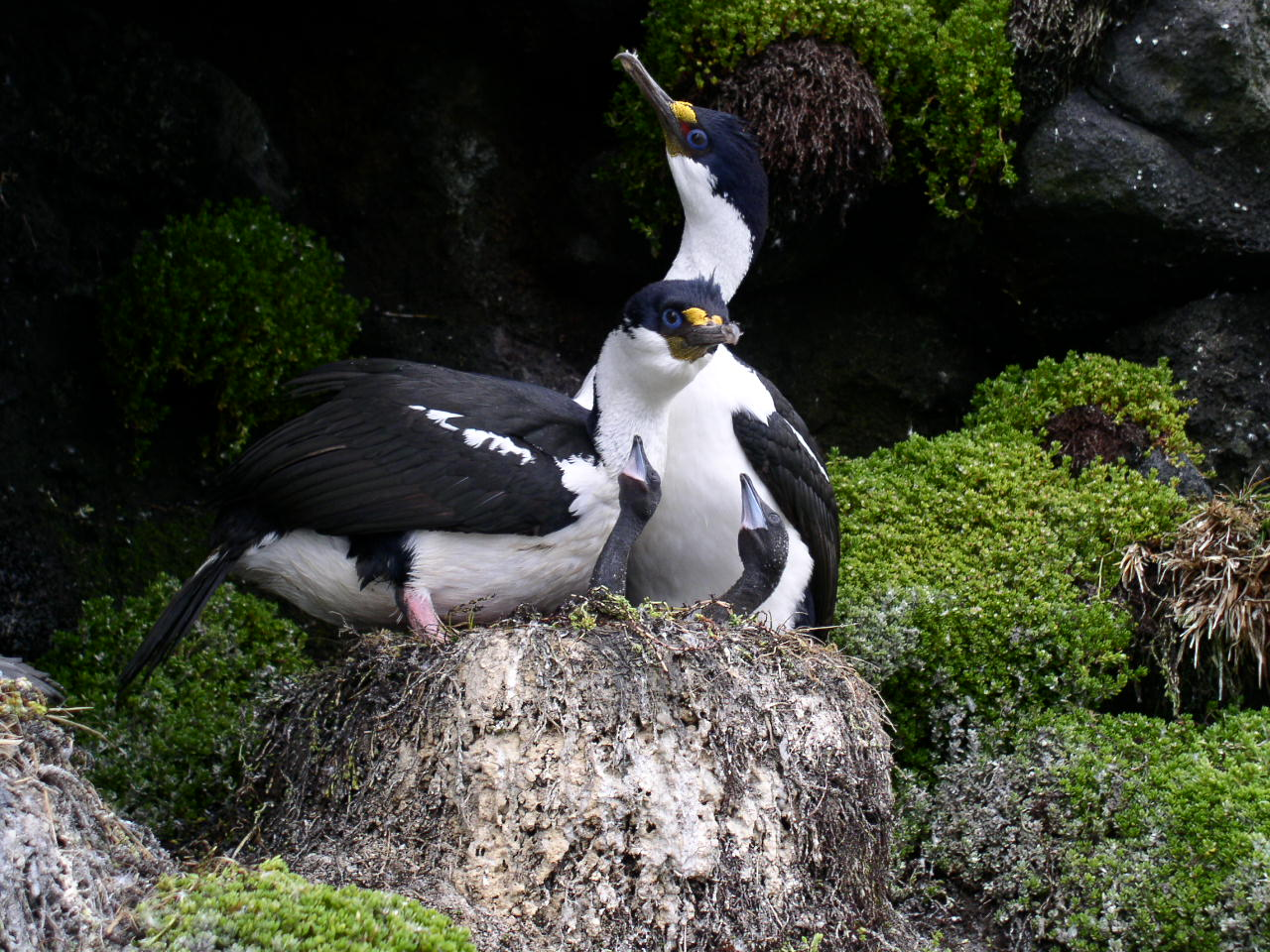
Crozet shag (L. a. melanogenis) on Île de la Possession

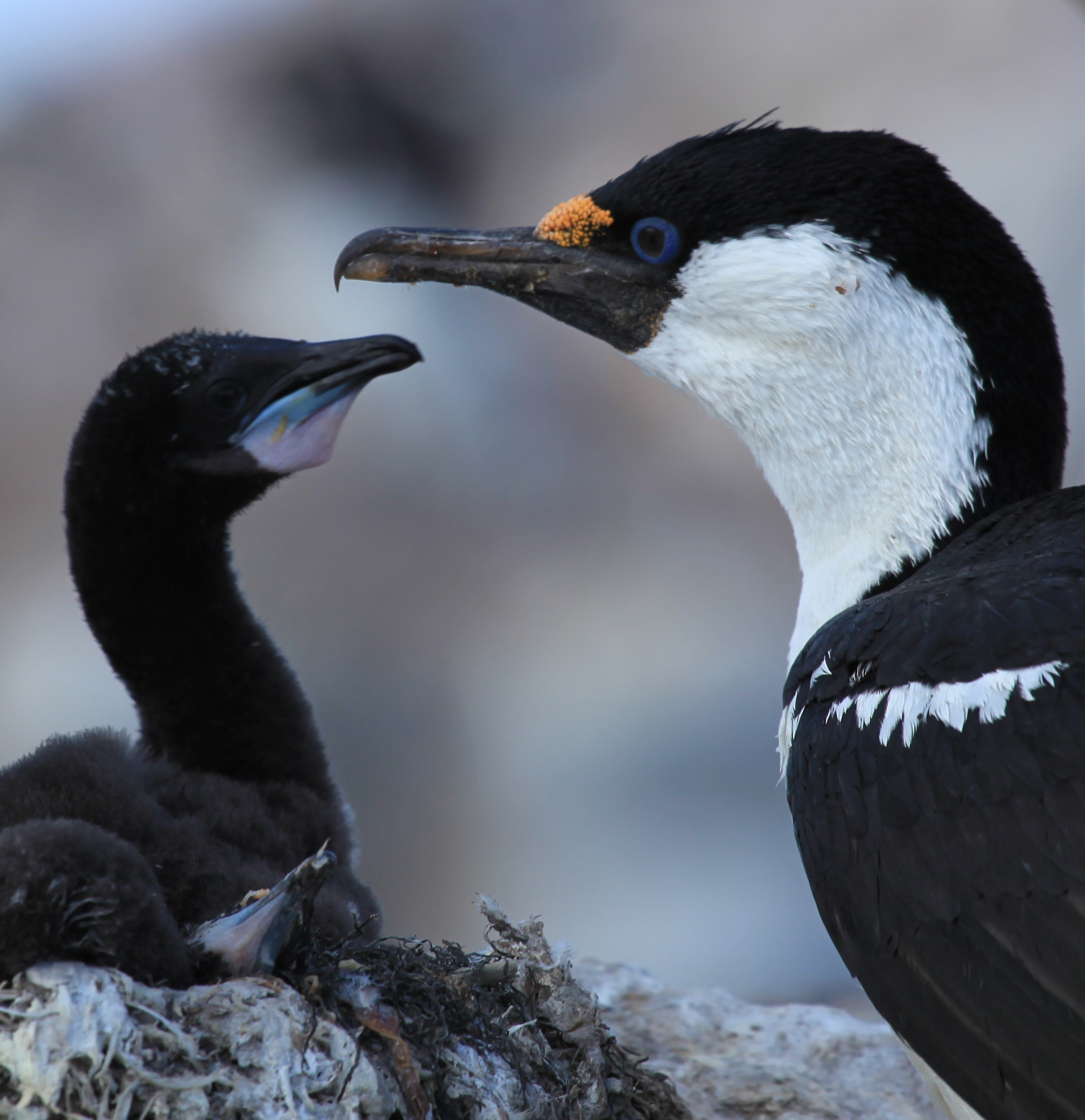
Antarctic shag (L. a. bransfieldensis) with chick at Jougla Point, Antarctica
