= Alice Creek (disambiguation) =

Alice Creek is a cove forming the southernmost portion of Port Lockroy, Wiencke Island, Antarctica.

Other places named Alice Creek include:

- Alice Creek (Montana)
- Alice Creek, Queensland, a locality in the South Burnett Region in Australia
