= Herdman Rocks =

The Herdman Rocks (60°42′S 44°20′W) are two rocks, 15 metres (50 ft) high, lying 1.5 nautical miles (3 km) southeast of Hart Rock and 3 nautical miles (6 km) northeast of Cape Dundas, Laurie Island, in the South Orkney Islands. They were first charted in 1838 by a French expedition under Captain Jules Dumont d'Urville. They were recharted in 1933 by Discovery Investigations and named after Henry F.P. Herdman, for whom Cape Herdman was also named.
