= James Marr (biologist) =

Scottish marine biologist and polar explorer

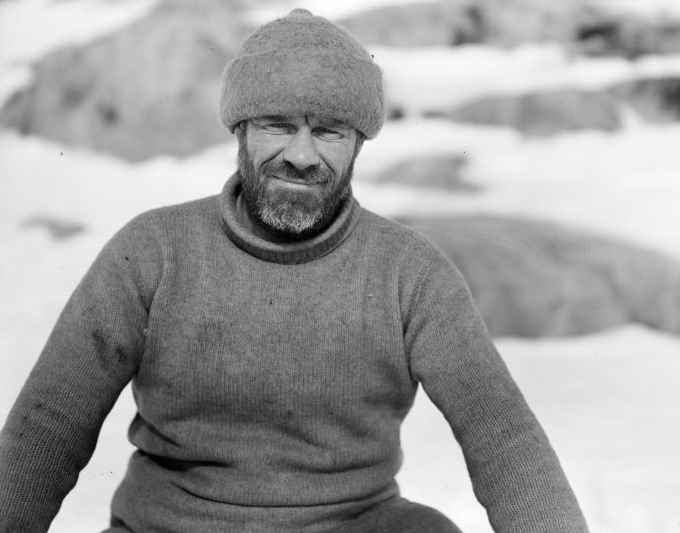
James Marr at Base A, Port Lockroy, 5 Nov 1944, during Operation Tabarin

James William Slessor Marr (9 December 1902 – 30 April 1965) was a Scottish marine biologist and polar explorer. He was leader of the World War II British Antarctic Expedition Operation Tabarin during its first year, 1943–1945.

== Biography ==
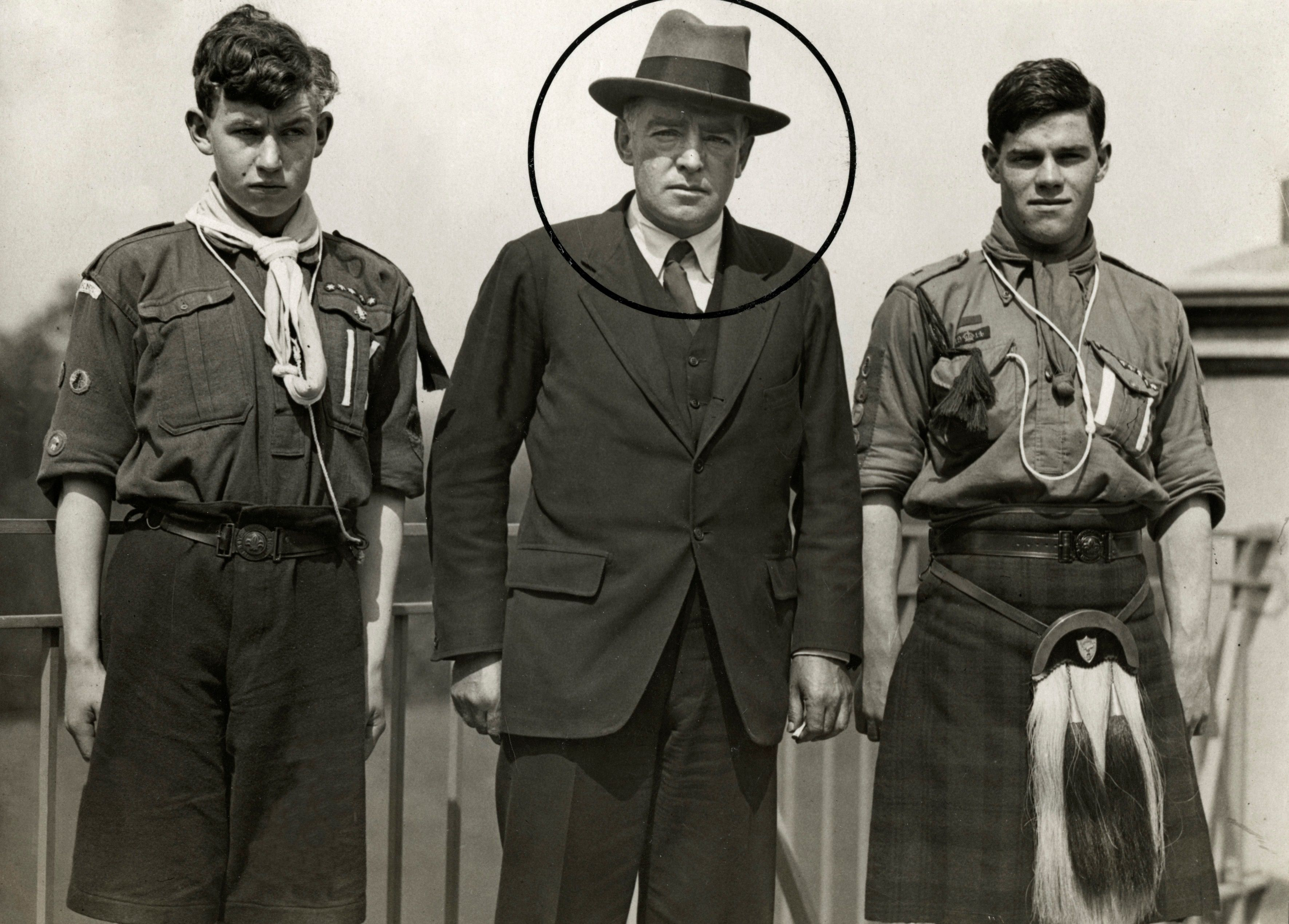
Mooney, Shackleton and Marr (1921)

Marr was born in Cushnie, Aberdeenshire, Scotland, on 9 December 1902. He was the son of farmer John George Marr and Georgina Sutherland Slessor. While studying classics and zoology at the University of Aberdeen, he and Norman Mooney were selected among thousands of Boy Scout volunteers to accompany Sir Ernest Shackleton on the Shackleton–Rowett Expedition in 1921, on board the vessel Quest. The expedition failed to reach its final objective, the Weddell Sea, due to Shackleton's death on 5 January 1922. Upon his return, Marr completed his MA in classics and BSc in zoology. In between, he had to participate in fundraising events that were organised in order to cover the expedition's debts; these included him standing in scout uniform outside cinemas where the film Quest was being shown. Marr spent 1926 as a Carnegie Scholar at a marine laboratory in Aberdeen. He took part in the British Australian and New Zealand Antarctic Research Expedition (BANZARE) with Sir Douglas Mawson. He went on to become a marine biologist, taking part in the Discovery Investigations (1928–1929, 1931–1933 and 1935–1937) specializing in Antarctic krill.

In 1943, during World War II, Lieutenant Marr was promoted to Lieutenant Commander on appointment as expedition leader of Operation Tabarin. This was a secret British Antarctic Expedition launched in 1943 with the intent of establishing permanently occupied bases, thus solidifying British claims to the region. Marr led the overwintering team at Port Lockroy in 1944 but resigned in December due to poor health. In 1949, he joined the National Institute of Oceanography as a Senior Scientific Officer working there until his death on 30 April 1965. His 460-page work Natural History and Geography of Antarctic Krill was published three years after his death.

== Honours and awards ==
- 1936 - W. S. Bruce Medal - for his work in the southern ocean and more particularly for his monograph on the South Orkney Islands.
- 7 October 1941 - Clasp to the Polar Medal (Bronze) - for good services between years 1925–1939, in the Royal Research Ships "Discovery II" and "William Scoresby": James William Sleesor Marr, Esq., M.A., BSc (now Temporary Lieutenant, R.N.V.R.), H.M. Ships Discovery II and William Scoresby.
- 30 November 1954 - Polar Medal - For good services with the Falkland Islands Dependencies Survey in Antarctic expeditions: Temporary Lieutenant-Commander James William Slessor Marr, R.N.V.R., Base Leader, Port Lockroy, 1944.

Mount Marr, in Antarctica, was discovered in January 1930 during the course of BANZARE and subsequently named after Marr.

Marr Bay, on Laurie Island, South Orkney Islands was named in Marr's honour in 1933 by members of the Discovery Investigations.

== See also ==
- Scouting in the Antarctic
- Operation Tabarin
- Paul Siple

== Sources ==
- Haddelsey, Stephen (2014). Operation Tabarin : Britain's secret wartime expedition to Antarctica, 1944–46. Stroud, UK: The History Press. ISBN 978-0-75249-356-5.

== Archives At ==
- State Library of New South Wales, J. W. S. Marr - Papers and pictorial material on Antarctic exploration, 1916-1944. SERIES 05: J. W. S. Marr - Papers on Antarctic exploration, 1916-1944. SERIES 06: Negatives of Shackleton-Rowett expedition, 1921-1922 aboard the Quest, including miscellaneous negatives of Shackleton's other expeditions and of Worsley's Arctic expedition, 1925. SERIES 07: Cuttings of 35 mm. half frame film from Shackleton-Rowett Expedition, 1921-1922 / J.W.S. Marr. nQR2ogZ1
