= Sinker Rock =

Sinker Rock (64°49′S 63°30′W) is a rock off the north tip of Goudier Island, near the center of the harbor of Port Lockroy, in the Palmer Archipelago. Rocks were charted in this position by the French Antarctic Expedition, 1903–05, under Charcot. So named by the Falkland Islands Dependencies Survey (FIDS) in 1944 because a sinker was laid near this rock for a boat mooring.
