= Scouting in the Antarctic =

- Chilly Willy is the mascot of the Esperanza Base group

Scouting in the Antarctic is maintained by a single troop of Argentine Scouts and also by visiting Scouts from other nations who are participating in expeditions and research projects.

== Permanent Scout Group ==
The southernmost Scout unit of the world, the Grupo Scouts 1556 "Esperanza Blanca", is at the Esperanza Base at the tip of the Antarctic Peninsula; it is affiliated to the Scouts de Argentina. Originally, the group belonged to the Asociación Diocesana de Scouts Católicos Argentinos Castrense (Diocesan Association of the Catholic Scouts of Argentina - Military Diocese), an independent Scout organization with links to the Union Internationale des Guides et Scouts d'Europe.

== Scouts participating in Antarctic expeditions ==
Charles Hoadley, who founded one of the first Scout Groups in Footscray, Victoria, Australia, was a member of the Australasian Antarctic Expedition led by Sir Douglas Mawson from 1911 to 1914. Hoadley was a member of the Western Base Party. Cape Hoadley was named after him upon discovery by the exploration party.

James William Slessor Marr was one of two British Scouts who were selected from 1,700 Scouting applicants to accompany Sir Ernest Shackleton on the 1921 Shackleton–Rowett Expedition. The expedition was curtailed following the death of Shackleton, but Marr later joined the 1929 British Australian and New Zealand Antarctic Research Expedition. The other Scout, Norman Mooney, left the expedition en route due to illness.

Paul Siple took part in two Byrd expeditions of 1928 to 1930 and 1933 to 1935, representing the Boy Scouts of America as an Eagle Scout.

=== BSA Antarctic Scientific Program ===
Following the example of Paul Siple, Eagle Scout Richard Chappell was selected to join the researchers of the United States Antarctic Program to mark International Geophysical Year in 1957–58. Mark Lienmiller was similarly selected to go to the Antarctic in 1978 for the 50th anniversary of Byrd's 1928 expedition. This was repeated in 1985 when Doug Barnhart was selected. These placements proved so successful that the National Science Foundation announced that once every three years, the National Science Foundation would sponsor an "Antarctic Scout" to join the Antarctic Program commencing in 1987, with the aim of "providing students with opportunities to participate in research activities outside the college or university setting".

== Scouting Antarctic expeditions ==
Three Scouts of Scouts Australia, Ian Brown, Keith Williams, and Peter Treseder, were the first Australians to walk unaided to the South Pole, and stood at the Pole with the World Scout flag on New Year's Day 1998. It took them 60 days to reach the Pole, pulling all their food and gear with them. "We gained our zest for adventure in Scouts. Scouting is fun and you learn to adventure safely," they said in a message broadcast from Antarctica to Scouts at the 1997/98 Australian Scout Jamboree.

In January 2019 Joe Doherty, a member of Hampshire Scout Expeditions, became the first Scout in the world to ski to the south pole and kite ski back. It took 66 days and covered over 2000 km. The team originally consisted of 5 members, but due to injury and other commitments, Joe went on a guided expedition there and back. Joe skied with 1 guide and two clients to the pole and kite skied back with the guide, from Antarctic Logistics and Expeditions (ALE). They carried all their own supplies, weighing up to 120kg at times.

In December 2021 Venturing Crew 774 of Orange County Council, CA, USA (part of the Boy Scouts of America) participated in an expedition to the Antarctic Peninsula. They traveled aboard the Plancius, operated by Oceanwide Expeditions. During the cruise they assisted with marine faunal collections, working with scientific divers from the Natural History Museum of Los Angeles, camped on the continent, kayaked, and worked on rank advancement and leadership training. 20 youth supported by 19 adult volunteers participated.

In January 2022 a ten strong team of Scouts (8 from Kent and 2 from Scotland) sailed to the Antarctic Peninsular as part of the REQUEST2021 Antarctica Project. This was to commemorate the 1921 - 1922 Shackleton-Rowett "Quest" Expedition for which Scouts James Marr and Norman Mooney were selected as cabin boys by Sir Ernest Shackleton.

== See also ==
- Scouting and Guiding in Argentina
