= Tito Alberti =

Noted Argentine jazz drummer (1923 - 2009)

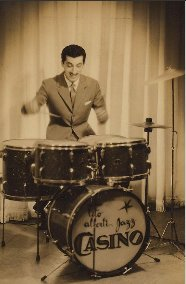
Jazz drummer Tito Alberti with his Jazz Casino, c. 1955

Tito Alberti (January 12, 1923 – March 25, 2009) was an Argentine jazz drummer.

== Life and work ==
Tito Alberti was born Juan Alberto Ficicchia in the port city of Zárate to an Argentine mother and a Sicilian father in 1923. Enjoying a gregarious childhood, he formed a band at age 7 with two brothers, Virgilio and Homero Expósito. The Expósitos, proprietors of a popular local café, encouraged the youthful trio to perform regularly at the establishment: Virgilio was the pianist, Homero played the ukulele, and Tito (as he was known by then) played battery and drums; among the audience one evening in 1930 was legendary tango crooner Carlos Gardel.

Tito was later a company drummer for the local Boy Scouts and, in his teens, enrolled at the Fracasi Conservatory, where he received formal training from Tony Carvajales, a well-known jazz drummer at the time. This experience was cut short, however, by his father's death in 1940, following which he was forced to find employment at Zárate's important Smithfield Foods abattoir. The relatively well-paid job allowed Tito to purchase his first professional drum kit and, in 1942, he was invited by producer Miguel Caló to record Azabache - a milonga written by his friend, Homero Expósito. The album's success brought him to the attention of Buenos Aires big band leader Raúl Marengo and in 1944 of Mexican songwriter Agustín Lara (internationally known by then for his pop standard "Granada").

His many appearances in Argentine radio led to a pseudonym, "Tito Alberti" and to a close friendship with a moderately successful matinée star, Eva Duarte. Her subsequent relationship with the populist Labor Minister, Juan Perón, helped lead to Argentina's Peronist movement (the country's central political development since 1945), among whose first adherents was the increasingly well-known drummer. He continued to receive lucrative contracts: he played for popular local swing orchestra, Ahmed Ratip's "Cotton Pickers," and for Mexican folklore standard Jorge Negrete. Alberti formed Reveríe, his first orchestra, in 1947, and performed at the Argentine Automobile Club's large auditorium. Reveríe became known for Alberti's whimsical, El elefante trompita ("Trunky the Elephant"), and the 1947 children's ditty became among the best-selling Spanish-language compositions in history.

This success earned him a recording contract with Phillips and regular guest appearances with Cuban mambo band leaders Xavier Cugat and Dámaso Pérez Prado, beginning in 1949. Maintaining a busy schedule in and outside Argentina, he created the "Jazz Casino" orchestra with José Finkel, in 1950, and on May 1 of that year, Jazz Casino was commissioned by President Perón to lead International Labor Day festivities. Jazz Casino performed with guest pianist Hugo La Rocca for Argentine television's first broadcast, in 1951, and they continued to lead official May Day festivities until Perón's 1955 overthrow.

Jazz Casino toured throughout Latin America until 1957, becoming well known for their fusion of Caribbean steel drum sounds with Latin jazz, a combination Alberti referred to as Dengue. The group disbanded, however, after which Alberti joined Cuban poet Nicolás Guillén in a touring literary and musical show called Tambores Cubanos ("Cuban Drums"), during 1958. Returning to Argentina that year, his Tito Alberti Orchestra became a fixture in Argentine entertainment and remained, until 1970, the top-grossing Argentine musical ensemble in its genre. They performed in fifty shows a month during that time, including most major local carnivals and a performance of Hasidic music for Israeli Prime Minister Golda Meir. Their hectic schedule and his increasing use of narcotics proved too much of a strain for Alberti, however, who retired for health reasons. The 1981 collapse of the numerous unregulated brokerage houses that opened in Argentina during Economy Minister José Alfredo Martínez de Hoz's free-wheeling tenure cost the musician his fortune, including a yacht and his collection of four roadsters.

The 76-year-old Alberti returned unexpectedly to the stage in 1998, when he joined a Chicago jazz sextet in a successful revival. This fleeting return was followed by one in Zárate's Teatro Coliseo, in 2005. Weakened by a kidney ailment, Tito Alberti died on March 25, 2009, at age 86. Named an Illustrious Citizen of the Province of Buenos Aires in 1999, he was survived by his wife Martha and two sons, both of whom are musicians (Charly Alberti was, for a number of years, the drummer for Argentine rock group Soda Stereo).

== References and external links ==
- MySpace: Tito Alberti
