= Scouting and Guiding in Ivory Coast =

Scouting and Guiding associations in Ivory Coast

The Scout and Guide movement in Ivory Coast is served by

- Fédération Ivoirienne du Scoutisme Féminin, member of the World Association of Girl Guides and Girl Scouts; consisting of:
  - Guides catholiques de Côte d'Ivoire
  - Eclaireuses laïques de Côte d'Ivoire
  - Eclaireuses unionistes de Côte d'Ivoire
- Fédération Ivoirienne du Scoutisme, member of the World Organization of the Scout Movement; consisting of:
  - Scouts catholiques de Côte d'Ivoire
  - Eclaireurs laïcs de Côte d'Ivoire
  - Eclaireurs unionistes de Côte d'Ivoire
  - Scouts Musulmans de Côte d'Ivoire
  - Eclaireuses et Eclaireurs Évangéliques de Côte d’Ivoire
- several non-aligned Scouting organizations, including
  - Conférence Ivorienne du Scoutisme
    - Eclaireurs neutres de Côte d'Ivoire
    - Scouts d'Afrique de Côte d'Ivoire
    - Scouts marins de Côte d'Ivoire
  - Scouts de l'université de Côte d'Ivoire
  - Scouts protestants de Côte d'Ivoire
  - Scouts évangélistes de Côte d'Ivoire
  - Scouts adventistes de Côte d'Ivoire
  - Raiders de Côte d'Ivoire
