= Scouting and Guiding in Benin =

Scouting and Guiding associations in Benin

The Scout and Guide movement in Benin is served by two organisations

- Guides du Bénin, member of the World Association of Girl Guides and Girl Scouts
- Scoutisme Béninois, member of the World Organization of the Scout Movement
