= Marcel Blaguet Ledjou =

- Born: July 8, 1971 (age 54); Abidjan, Côte d'Ivoire
- Occupations: Director of Communication and External Relations at the Town Hall of Port-Bouët, Abidjan
- Known for: One of 12 elected volunteer members of the World Scout Committee

Marcel Blaguet Ledjou of Abidjan, Côte d'Ivoire (born July 8, 1971) is one of 12 elected volunteer members of the World Scout Committee, the main executive body of the World Organization of the Scout Movement. Ledjou served as the Chairman of the Africa Scout Committee, elected during the 13th Africa Scout Conference held from September 3 to 7, 2007 in Kigali, Rwanda succeeding Jos Nanette of Mauritius. Ledjou was elected to the World Scout Committee at the 39th World Scout Conference in Brazil in January 2011. Ledjou's term on the World Scout Committee expired at the 40th World Scout Conference in Ljubljana, Slovenia in 2014, but was eligible for re-election for one additional term.

Ledjou is the National Executive Commissioner of the Association des Scouts catholiques de Côte d'Ivoire. Since November 2006 Ledjou is the Director of Communication and External Relations at the Town Hall of Port-Bouët, Abidjan, and holds a master's degree in communication, Administration and Management from the Université de Cocody in Abidjan. Ledjou is married and is a father of one child.
