= Scouting and Guiding in Guinea =

Scouting and Guiding associations in Guinea

The Scout and Guide movement in Guinea is served by two organisations

- Association Nationale des Guides de Guinée, member of the World Association of Girl Guides and Girl Scouts
- Association Nationale des Scouts de Guinée, member of the World Organization of the Scout Movement
