= Francis Charles Fraser =

Scottish zoologist (1903–1978)

- Born: 16 June 1903
- Died: 21 October 1978 (aged 75)
- Known for: Fraser's dolphin, Fraser Point
- Awards: Fellow of the Royal Society
- Scientific career
- Workplaces: British Museum of Natural History

Francis Charles Fraser CBE FRS (16 June 1903 – 21 October 1978) was a Scottish zoologist, one of the world's leading authorities on cetacea (whales and dolphins). He worked at the British Museum (Natural History) from 1933 to 1969.

== Life ==
He was born at Dingwall, Ross-shire, the son of James Fraser, master saddler and blacksmith, and Barbara Anne Macdonald. He was educated at Dingwall Academy and the University of Glasgow.

Following a brief period as demonstrator in the department of geology at the University of Glasgow, Fraser worked from 1925-33 as a zoologist for the British government's Discovery Committee, investigating whale stocks around the Falkland Islands.

In 1933 Fraser started as assistant keeper in the department of zoology at the British Museum (Natural History), soon specialising in whale research. He was responsible for the 1938 installation of the blue whale model in the museum's whale hall. With the exception of a period during the Second World War working for the Admiralty, he continued to work on whales for the entirety of his career at the museum, continuing his research after retirement in 1969, with work on whale strandings on the British coast and notable research on the hearing of marine mammals. He served as Keeper of Zoology between 1957 and 1964 and was made CBE in 1962 and a Fellow of the Royal Society in 1966. He was awarded the Polar Medal in 1942.

Fraser's dolphin and Fraser Point are named in his honour.
