= Lécuyer Point =

Point on Wiencke Island, Palmer Archipelago, Antarctica

Lécuyer Point (64°50′S 63°30′W) is a point which forms the south side of the entrance to the harbor of Port Lockroy, Wiencke Island, in the Palmer Archipelago, Antarctica. It was discovered and named by the French Antarctic Expedition, 1903–05, under Jean-Baptiste Charcot.
