= Hart Rock =

Rock in the South Orkney Islands

Coordinates: 60°41′S 44°22′W

Hart Rock is a rock, 10 metres (33 ft) high, lying 1.5 nautical miles (2.8 km; 1.7 mi) northwest of the Herdman Rocks and 3 nautical miles (5.6 km; 3.5 mi) north-northeast of the eastern extremity of Laurie Island, in the South Orkney Islands. It was first charted in 1838 by a French expedition under d'Urville. The rock was named in 1933 by Discovery Investigations personnel on the Discovery II, for T. John Hart, a member of the zoological staff of the Discovery Committee.
