= Watson Peninsula =

Peninsula of Antarctica

Coordinates: 60°42′S 44°32′W

Location in Antarctica

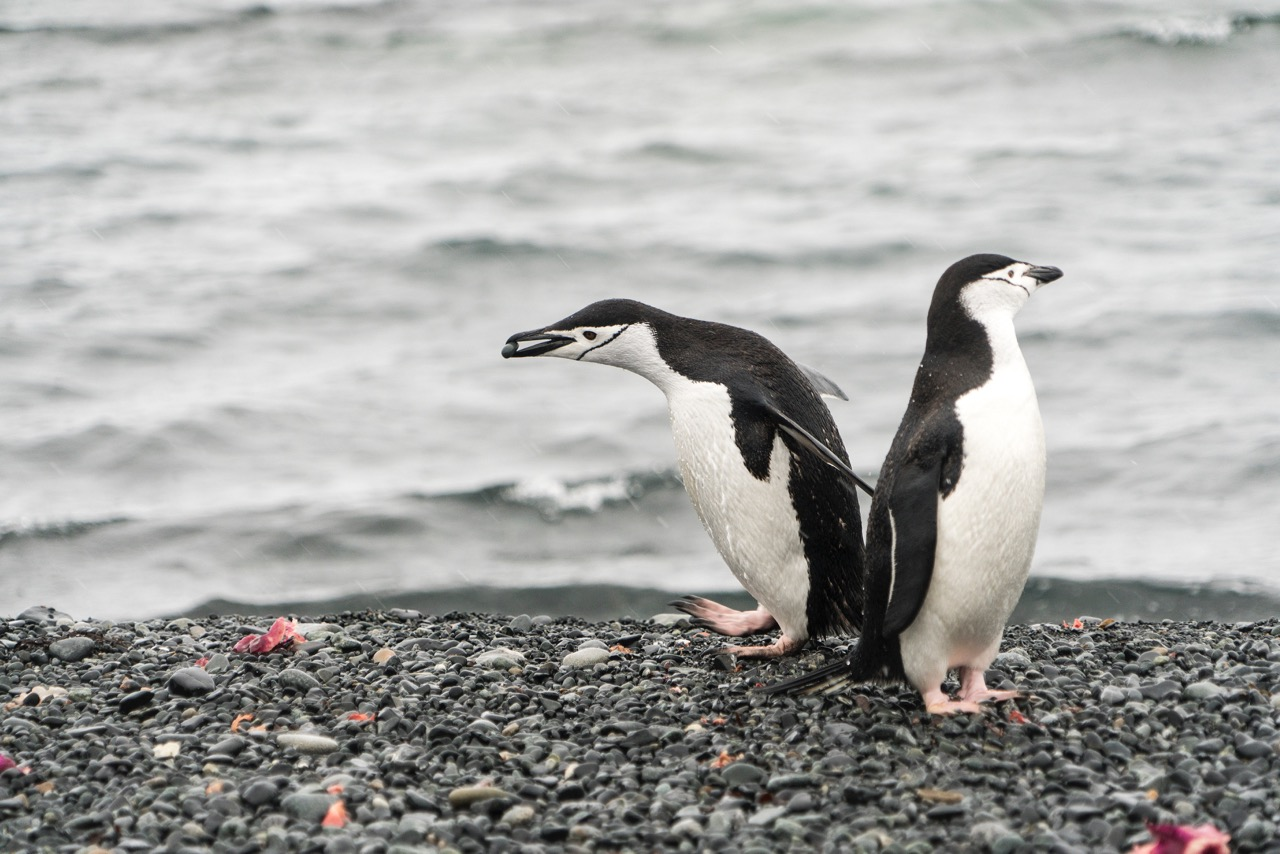
Chinstrap penguins breed in the IBA

Watson Peninsula is a narrow peninsula 4 km (2.5 mi) long separating Macdougal and Marr Bays on the north coast of Laurie Island, in the South Orkney Islands of Antarctica. It was charted in 1903 by the Scottish National Antarctic Expedition under Bruce, who named it for G.L. Watson, yacht designer and redesigner of the expedition ship Scotia.

== Important Bird Area ==
The peninsula has been identified an Important Bird Area (IBA) by BirdLife International because it supports a large breeding colony of about 13,000 pairs of chinstrap penguins. Other birds nesting at the site include Adélie and gentoo penguins as well as southern giant petrels.
