= Fraser Point =

Headland of Antarctica

Coordinates: 60°41′S 44°31′W

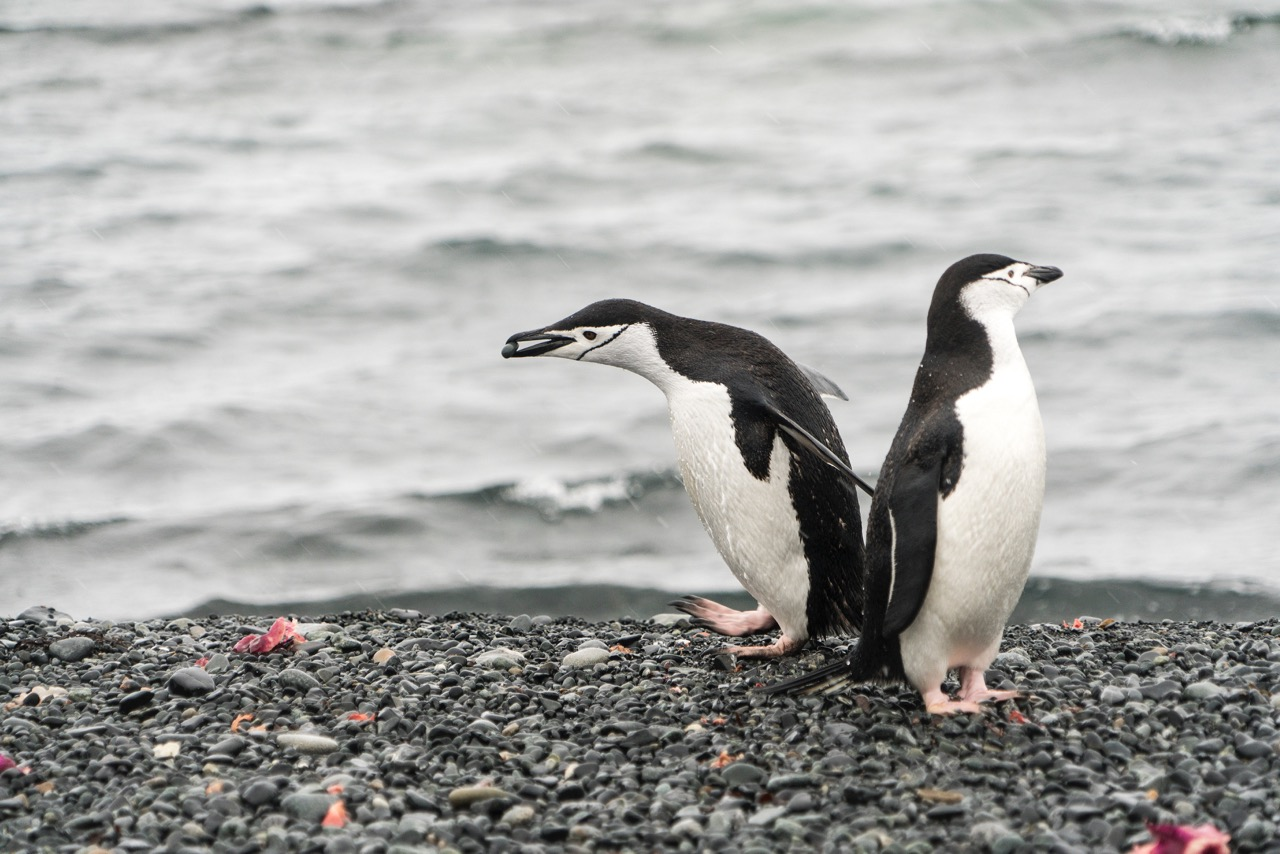
Chinstrap penguins breed in the IBA

Fraser Point is a point between Marr Bay and Mackintosh Cove on the north coast of Laurie Island, in the South Orkney Islands of Antarctica. It was mapped by the Scottish National Antarctic Expedition in 1903, and in 1912–13 by Captain Petter Sorlle. It was remapped in 1933 by Discovery Investigations personnel on the Discovery II who named it for Francis C. Fraser.

== Important Bird Area ==
A 36 hectares (89 acres) site, comprising the ice-free land to the south of the headland, including the eastern shore of Marr Bay and western shore of Mackintosh Cove, has been identified as an Important Bird Area (IBA) by BirdLife International because it supports a large breeding colony of about 11,000 pairs of chinstrap penguins.
