= Scouting and Guiding in Madagascar =

Scouting and Guiding associations in Madagascar

The Scout and Guide movement in Madagascar is served by

- Skotisma Zazavavy eto Madagasikara, member of the World Association of Girl Guides and Girl Scouts, which includes three Members organizations :
  - Fanilon'i Madagasikara (Catholic, girls only)
  - Kiadin'i Madagasikara (interreligious, coeducational)
  - Mpanazava eto Madagasikara (Protestant, girls only)
- Firaisan'ny Skotisma eto Madagasikara, member of the World Organization of the Scout Movement, and which includes three National Scout Associations:
  - Antilin'i Madagasikara (Catholic, boys only)
  - Kiadin'i Madagasikara (interreligious, coeducational)
  - Tily eto Madagasikara (Protestant, boys only)

== History ==
A first scout patrol has appeared in Madagascar on April 9, 1922, initiated by Reverend Jhon Fuller RADLEY. One Year later, on 1923, the Catholic scouts are established, led by Pierre Du Mas de Paysac followed by the protestant in 1924, led by Jean Beigbeder.
