= Marr Bay =

Bay in Antarctica

Marr Bay (60°42′S 44°31′W) is a bay lying between Cape Valavielle and Fraser Point along the north coast of Laurie Island, in the South Orkney Islands off Antarctica. It was mapped in 1903 by the Scottish National Antarctic Expedition under William Speirs Bruce, and was named for James W.S. Marr, a member of the Discovery Committee zoological staff, by personnel on the Discovery II following their survey of the South Orkney Islands in 1933.
