= Goudier Island =

Island in Palmer Archipelago, Antarctica

Location of Goudier Island

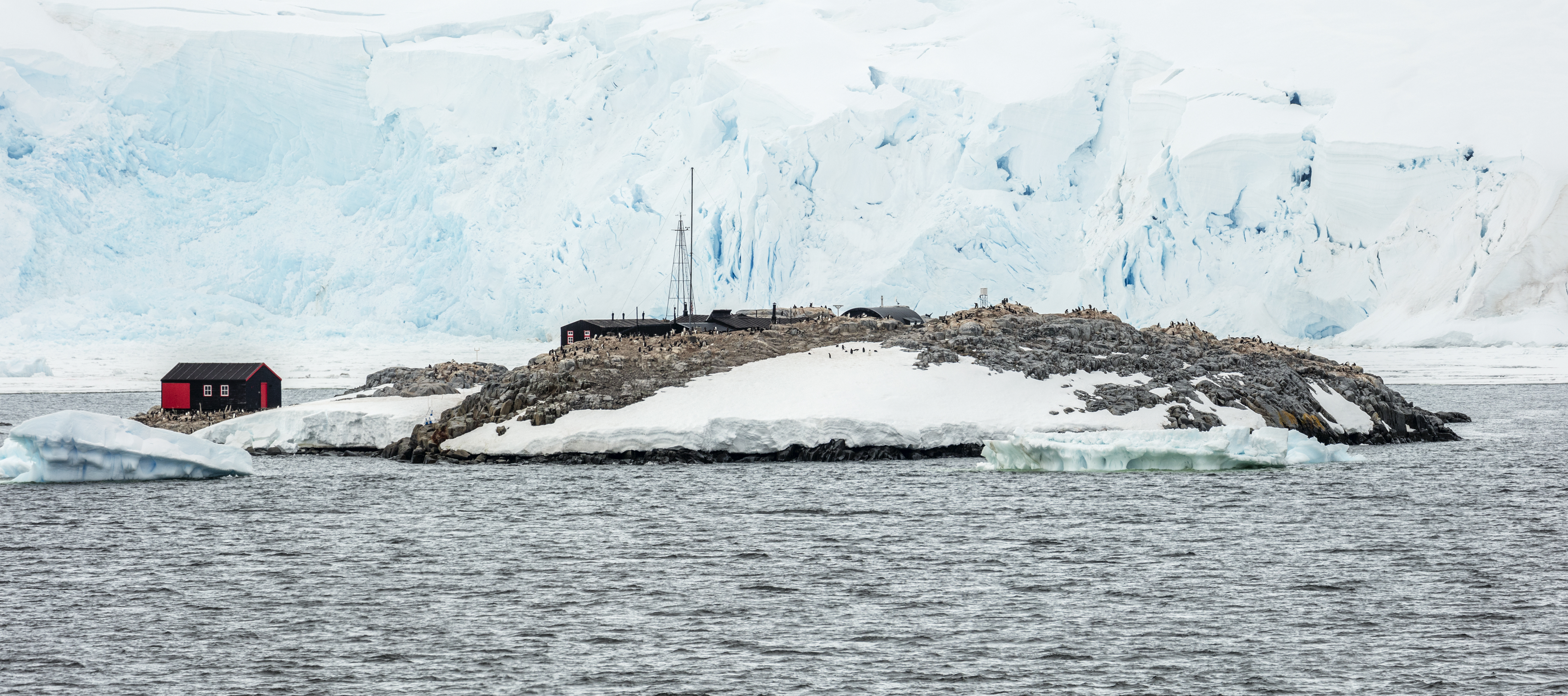
Goudier Island

Goudier Island (64°50′S 63°30′W) is a small island with an appearance of bare, polished rock, lying 0.05 nautical miles (0.1 km) north of Jougla Point in the harbour of Port Lockroy, Wiencke Island, in the Palmer Archipelago. It was discovered by the French Antarctic Expedition, 1903–05, under Jean-Baptiste Charcot, and named after E. Goudier, chief engineer of the expedition ship Français.

Operation Tabarin established a research base, station A, on the island in 1944. Research continued until 1962 when operations were transferred to Station F (Faraday station) on the Argentine Islands. It was restored in 1996 and is now one of the most popular tourist attractions in Antarctica.

== See also ==
- List of Antarctic and subantarctic islands
- Sinker Rock
