= Skotisma Zazavavy eto Madagasikara =

National Guiding federation of Madagascar

- Country: Madagascar
- Founded: 1941
- Membership: 25,152
- Affiliation: World Association of Girl Guides and Girl Scouts

Skotisma Zazavavy eto Madagasikara is the national Guiding federation of Madagascar. It serves 25,152 members (as of 2008). Founded in 1941, the federation became a full member of the World Association of Girl Guides and Girl Scouts in 1963.

Members of the federation are

- Fanilon'i Madagasikara (Catholic, girls only)
- Kiadin'i Madagasikara - Eclaireuses et Eclaireurs de Madagascar (interreligious, coeducational)
- Mpanazava eto Madagasikara sy Tily eto Madagasikara - Eclaireuses et Eclaireurs Unionistes de Madagascar (Protestant Unionist Guides and Scouts of Madagascar, coeducational)

The two latter organizations are also members of the Firaisan'ny Skotisma eto Madagasikara, the national Scouting federation, which is a member of the World Organization of the Scout Movement.

== See also ==
- Firaisan'ny Skotisma eto Madagasikara
- Scouting and guiding in Madagascar
