= Ernest Mehinto =

Benin Scouting leader

Leader of Scoutisme Dahoméen

Ernest Mehinto (-‡2002 to 2005) was a veterinarian and a leader of Scoutisme Dahoméen who served as the Chairman of the Africa Scout Committee.

In 1977, Mehinto was awarded the 109th Bronze Wolf, the only distinction of the World Organization of the Scout Movement, awarded by the World Scout Committee for exceptional services to world Scouting.
