= Scouting and Guiding in Cameroon =

Scouting and Guiding associations in Cameroon

The Scout and Guide movement in Cameroon is served by two organisations

- Association des Guides du Cameroun, member of the World Association of Girl Guides and Girl Scouts
- Les Scouts du Cameroun, member of the World Organization of the Scout Movement
