= Macdougal Bay =

Bay in Antarctica

Macdougal Bay (60°42′S 44°33′W) is a small bay lying between Ferguslie Peninsula and Watson Peninsula on the north coast of Laurie Island, in the South Orkney Islands, Antarctica. It was charted in 1903 by the Scottish National Antarctic Expedition under William Speirs Bruce, who named it for J. Macdougal, third mate of the expedition ship Scotia.
