= Scouting and Guiding in Argentina =

Scouting and Guiding organizations in Argentina

Scouting began to be practiced in Argentina in August 1908. It emerged from isolated initiatives, generally in English schools.

A Scout patrol of Anglo-Argentine students greeted Baden-Powell on his way to visit Argentina, Uruguay and Chile in 1908.

In 1912, the Argentine Boy Scouts Association (Asociación de Boy Scouts Argentinos) was formally established. In 1917, was recognized as a National Institution, and renamed the National Institution of Argentine Scouting (Institución Nacional del Scoutismo Argentino, INSA), and was among the charter members of the World Organization of the Scout Movement in 1922.

At 1937 a Catholic Scout Union (USCA) was created under the sponsorship of the Roman Catholic Church and operated separately until December 2, 1996, when both national associations (INSA and USCA) merged to form the Scouts de Argentina.

Scouts de Argentina is the country's leading Scout organization and a member of the World Organization of the Scout Movement. The Asociación Guías Argentinas is the country's national Guiding organization and a member of the World Association of Girl Guides and Girl Scouts.

== History ==
The origin of Scouting in Argentina is almost simultaneous with its appearance in England in 1907. The Scouting begins to be applied in Argentina in August 1908 following publication of the book 'Scouting for Boys' and comes from individual initiatives, often in English schools. Is institutionalized in 1912 in an association at the national level, which at the end of 1917 is recognized by a Presidential decree by Dr. Hipólito Yrigoyen as a National Institution. Despite this, some groups did not join that institution not to share the focus on educational programs. At the end of the 1920s are beginning to emerge as homogeneous religious groups sponsored by the Catholic Church, which since 1937 institutionalizing the Union Scouts Católicos Argentinos. As collateral phenomenon of migration from, are associations of local scouts who try to uphold the traditions of the countries where they emigrated. Many of these partnerships of local scouts (white Russians, Armenians) with time are similar to existing national institutions. Today the practice of the method and Scout Program developed by Robert Baden-Powell in 1907 adopted as different ways in late 1996 with the unification of the Asociacion de Scouts de Argentina and Union Scouts Católicos Argentinos emerging new partnerships that do not share focus on educational programs of the unified association: Scouts de Argentina.

=== Emergence of Scouting in Argentina ===
==== Early patrols Scouts of America ====
The history of Scouting in Argentina begins when they reach the hands of Penny Arthur, a boy of 13 years, son of England, the six deliveries as a fortnightly magazine for young people of "Scouting for Boys" was published by Robert Baden-Powell in London. Barely a year after Camp Brownsea, in reading this publication begins to form his patrol on August 27, 1908 at Banfield, Buenos Aires, a city in the Lomas de Zamora Partido of Buenos Aires Province. The patrol called the "Eagle" and was elected Patrol Guide. Immediately arises Patrol "Foca", with its Guide Patrol Arturo F. Pearson. These patrols are two known then as the 1st Company Boy Scouts of Lomas de Zamora, now Scout Group No. 1 "General Juan Galo Lavalle" of Scouts de Argentina. The first activities were held at the home of Dr. Daniel Moreno (brother of Perito Moreno), who acts as a Scout Master and provides a space in its fifth placed at the intersection of the streets Leandro N. Alem and French, compared to the station Banfield. His first camp was a Morón, Buenos Aires, Gándara at Chascomús Partido and Claypole, Buenos Aires. According to historical facts is verifiable 1st Scout Troop in the Americas, however it is considered that Chile is the first country to establish their partnership outside England since the institutionalization of the Scout Movement in Argentina has just done in July 1912.

==== Baden Powell visit to Argentina, Chile and Uruguay ====
1909 arrives at the Argentina - General Robert Baden-Powell, hero of Mafeking, officially pleasure trip with the Duke of Richmond and her daughter. Spreading their "hobby" of the Boy Scouts, the idea being to be a global movement. To arrive at the port of Buenos Aires in the ship Aragon on March 14 received the greetings of the Scouts set up patrols in Lomas de Zamora, directed by Arturo Penny in a uniform and improvised. Baden Powell acknowledged the salute and gave Penny a copy of Scouting for Boys with a dedication written and signed by him at the same time and with both hands. This anecdote is told by Russell D. Christian, assistant secretary of YMCA, who at the request of YMCA of Buenos Aires he was invited to deliver a lecture on "Boy Scouts". This exhibition was held on Thursday, April 8 (9 returned to England).

==== Steps of Baden-Powell in Argentina as reported by local newspapers ====
- March 15: reports to remain in our country 3 weeks. Is housed in a department that the Jockey Club makes available. Is hosted by Sir Charles Henry Gordon-Lennox, Duke of Richmond at the home of Mr Drysdale. B-P visit the Hippodrome of Palermo in the company of his aide Lt. Portela and partners. He says the facility as one of the best in the world.
- March 16: lunch with distinguished gentlemen in the local table called Circulo de Armas. In the evening attended a dinner in his honor hosted by Colonel Alfredo Urquiza from the salon in Elizabeth.
- March 18 and 17 travels with his companions at Paysandú, Uruguay, visiting factories and other establishments. BP returns only the final 18.
- March 19 Accompanied by a city official, Jose I Matti; Baden Powell in the afternoon visit the Zoo and Buenos Aires Botanical Garden, then visited the neighborhood of Belgrano and dinner at Olivos.
- March 20 along with the Duke of Richmond, accompanied by the head of the Military Cabinet, Colonel Allaria, and a group of officers visited the camp in May, the School of Shooting and other military units. BP made the journey on horseback, lunch on the Felling and then returned to Hurlingham.
- March 21 Baden-Powell by the morning heading to Chile, the rail line San Martin via Cordillera de los Andes.
- March 27 return by train to Buenos Aires, to reach the tunnel, which was under construction, there was waiting an official of the railway that accompanies riding mules on the road switchbacks called 'Los Caracoles' to move to altitude of 3720 m. from where they descended to the head of the Argentine side of the railroad.
- March 28 arrived last night, remains in Puente del Inca. From where they visit on their way the Christ the Redeemer of the Andes, leaving a further account of his experience in the book Rovering to Success.
- March 29 arrives in Mendoza to catch the train to Buenos Aires. Visit wineries and vineyards. Comes grateful for the care that has been in Chile.
- March 30: Baden Powell arrived back from Chile and Mendoza.
- Until April 4 stays sick for lung ailments.
- April 7 Visit the Argentine National Congress, exchanging ideas with local legislators.
- April 8 Morning visit the Regiment of Mounted Grenadiers (Argentina) José de San Martín, a few years of its new entry into service. Other lunch with his boss, General Pablo Riccheri. In the evening participate in the Conference on the Boy Scouts, to which was committed, was given in the auditorium of YMCA.

, on the streets of 452 Moreno street, San Telmo, in the city of Buenos Aires.

- April 9 the trip back along with his companions.

==== Consequences of Baden-Powell's dissertation ====
Baden-Powell gave a lecture in the afternoon of Thursday, April 8, 1909, in the auditorium of YMCA on the streets of Barrio 452 Moreno of San Telmo, Buenos Aires. Just finished the dissertation the founder of YMCA, Bertram A. Shuman, offers its partners make an extraordinary meeting on Saturday April 10. Unanimously approved the motion and is established as the sole item on the Agenda Committee to form a Promoter of Scouting in Argentina. Until then the existing companies had emerged from individual initiatives, without a guide. On August 10 were elected members of the Scouting Promoter Commission:

- Chairman: J. Monteith Drysdale
- Vice President: RF Wall Burney
- Secretary: MS Fairlie
- Treasurer: J. Wilson
- Vocals: Penny and Arthur CC Kennard.

=== Promotion of Scouting in Argentina ===
==== Travel to United States ====
As part of this commitment, YMCA sent him to Russell D. Christian to United States to interview Ernest Thompson Seton founded the "Woodcraft Indians", a youth movement that took inspiration from the Native Americans.

In October 1910, Russell D. Christian, during his return voyage, the ship received a letter from the commission to be the promoter provides Chief Scout. Politely rejected the request to be the future first President of the Argentine Association of Boy Scouts, explaining that if the post was occupied by an outstanding Argentine dissemination of the emerging movement would best support. Finally assumed as National Scout Commissioner (coordinator of educational methods, i.e. Youth Program Training and Scouters).

==== Tournament Scouts ====
Immediately Russell D. Christian is dedicated to spreading the scouts and individuals interested in sponsoring a new company. To attain public visibility organizes' Scout Tournament '. On December 8, 1910 is the first tournament with the participation of Scout Companies Lomas de Zamora and Scots College, which were first created. Then, in late 1910, Fairlie organized a camp for the two companies together to Russell D. Christian, who as Assistant Field applies some of the activities observed to Ernest Thompson Seton. We know, furthermore, that local authorities were also encouraging groups or companies, as they are called in that time. In December 1910 the MS Fairlie organized and ran a camp for the two companies, which assists Russell D. Christian as an assistant.

==== Companies are beginning to emerge new ====
In 1911 the branch opened in Boca — Barracks of YMCA, located in the Montes de Oca 958 Street, 2nd Cía. of Barracas and "English High School" was born the 1st Cía. Villa Devoto. On September 3, 1911, Arthur Penny, the Patrol Guide Lomas de Zamora received a BP in the port, presented to Russell D. Christian with the "Perito" Moreno, then School Board President and Deputy National V. The "Perito" Moreno permission to follow with interest the development of Scouting in YMCA through conversations with his brother, who participated in the Lomas de Zamora Company. From that meeting was how the 3rd Cía. Barracks (In the present 3er Scout Company Cnel Pringles) at the School of No. 12.CE.No 20 St. Mary Street 479 Barracks with the sponsorship of the "Work of the Fatherland." In 1911, for the effort and personal contribution of Arthur Young Engineer is published for twelve months, the magazine "El Argentino Scout" then that would be the official organ of the Movement. Young engineer worked installing telephones, radio stations, which is far from Buenos Aires and was so together with Christian, who was convalescing in Cordova, material sent from there to the magazine and continued to appear. The proposals and ideas of Scouting spread, born ences. In Palermo, Belgrano, Caballito, Flores and the center of the City of Buenos Aires (Estrada Cia). Groups appear to "Boy Scouts", "leading to the Motherland", also "Explorers Argentinos", plus local groups that sponsor foreign Different groups are friends and sometimes mutually antagonistic, lack direction and ran the risk of Scouting pervert. In that year and early 1912 there are new companies in other areas of the city of Buenos Aires: Palermo, Belgrano, Caballito, Flores and the center of the City of Buenos Aires (Estrada Cia). However, there was a common direction of Scouting Argentina.

=== Institutionalization of Scouting in Argentina ===
The Commission on the Promotion of Scouting Argentina emerged from the initiative of YMCA manages the support of the Patriotic Association "Work of the Homeland", consisting of eminent persons, chaired by Francisco Moreno Pascasio, to create a partnership that meets all scattered efforts. On 4 julo 1912 is the constituent assembly of the Argentine Association of Boy Scouts, whose participants were declared "Founders of Scouting in Argentina." Through the Patriotic Association "Work of the Homeland", consisting of eminent persons, chaired by its founder, "Perito" Francisco Moreno, coordinating with the Promoter of Scouting in Argentina sponsored by YMCA; resolves sponsor creation of an Association that meets all the attempts and efforts in pursuit of profit that gave Scouting to boys. Thus on 4 julo 1912 is the constituent assembly of the Argentine Association of Boy Scouts, whose participants were declared "Founders of Scouting in Argentina." The meeting worked founding the following: [Edit] MINUTES OF THE FOUNDATION OF ARGENTINE ASSOCIATION OF BOY SCOUTS "ACT ONE" Session of the July 4, 1912 "In the City of Buenos Aires, to four days of July, nineteen hundred twelve, the subscribed, Argentines and foreigners gathered at the home of Dr. Francisco Moreno, Calle Caseros 2841, penetrated by the desirability of promoting the civilization and life in Argentina, function and maintenance of an institution to its purpose, which was organized in London the illustrious General Baden Powell, under the name of Boy Scouts, and whose idea has been the most enthusiastic reception in England, in many nations of Europe and America, from children and teachers, and after an exchange of ideas about the importance of education as a means to stimulate the life of children and youth of the Republic a taste for outdoor excursions, observations in nature, the cult of honor, loyalty and honesty, respect and mastery of self and others, to love neighbor of the family, the fatherland and to humanity, solves: FIRST: In accordance with the plan of the Association of the "Work of the Homeland", and combining these efforts in previous works, the Organizing Committee to become the Movement country. SECOND: The institution was called the "Argentine Association of Boy Scouts' THIRD: To appoint Mr. Francisco Moreno, President, General Rosendo Fraga, Vice President Montheit Drysdale. Treasurer; Doctor Modesto Quiroga, Secretary; general Allaria Angel P, Juan José Biedma, John Canter, Dr. Manuel J. Corvalán General Luis J. Dellepiane, Ricardo Dowdall, Clemente Onelli, General Pablo Richieri, Carlos R. Ripamonte Colonel Martín Rodríguez, Tomás Santa Coloma, Dr. Frank L. Soler, Carlos Thays engineer Arthur Young, Board Members and National Commissioner, Russell D. Christian, to constitute the Provisional Organizing Board. FOURTH: To authorize the President, Secretary and Commissioner to begin the work of organization, to adopt Rules and Regulations and carry out acts of action and propaganda do know the idea of the institution in the country and stimulate greater interest by the national development of it. There being no other business, which was read this, aprobose unanimously adjourned at 7 pm and signed for the record.

 Signed

- FRANCISCO P. MORENO,
- MODESTO QUIROGA,
- DANIEL MORENO,
- ANGEL P. ALLARIA

Fundación "La Obra De La Patria", along with YMCA, were the founders of organizations and Argentina resulted in the Scouting Association. In 1917 a national decree of President Hipólito Yrigoyen said the National Institution. [Edit] Unification of ASA and USCA

In the 1980s the first exchanges take place between the 2 scouts associations majority of Argentina (INSA after ASA and USCA) to talk about a future unity or federation that meets. These attempts by certain interests are not always well explained and is not specified, only in 1992 restart talks under the auspices of the Interamerican Scout Office. As a result of these talks setting up a European Constitution with the task of agreeing a merger status of the two Associations, reserving the USCA as the Association of Private Faithful through the creation of a "Scout Catholic Pastoral Committee (COPASCA) suprainstitucional in character with the new partnership that arises from the unit. These Agreements are approved by the Argentine Episcopal Conference, but each diocese reserves its right to form private associations of the faithful in their jurisdiction where they can see the identity of the weakened Catholic Scouts in its two key aspects, "Faithfulness to the Scout Movement and fidelity to Catholic doctrine, (USCA WORK OF THE CHURCH). On December 1 of 1996, merged the Union Scouts Católicos Argentinos (USCA) and the Association of Scouts of Argentina (ASA), a National Assembly in the town of Ezeiza in the land of the Trade Union of Employees of Industry and Textiles Allied Republic of Argentina (SETI). As a result of this merger creates a unified new partnership: Scouts of Argentina. Groups Scouts who differ with the idea of creating a unified association Diocesan Associations (ADISCAS) covering the beginning of the article and others are kept separate from any structure, becoming familiarly called "Groups Scouts parish."

== Scout associations ==
There are currently a large number of associations that use the Scout method in Argentina:

- Scouts de Argentina, member of the World Organization of the Scout Movement, interreligious, co-educational, 70,000 members
- Asociación Guías Argentinas, member of the World Association of Girl Guides and Girl Scouts, interreligious, co-educational, 4,894 members
- Scouts y Guías Adultos de Argentina, member of the ISGF Central Branch since 2003.
- Coordinación De Asociaciones Diocesanas De Scouts Católicos Argentinos (CADISCA), a federation of several Catholic Scout associations, observer at the Union Internationale des Guides et Scouts d'Europe, co-educational
- Asociación de Guías Argentinas Católicas, Catholic, girls-only
- Asociación Argentina de Scouts de Baden Powell, affiliated to the Baden-Powell Scouts and the World Federation of Independent Scouts
- Sociedad Argentina de Boy Scouts Independientes, affiliated to the World Federation of Independent Scouts
- Exploradores Argentinos de Don Bosco Movimiento Exploradoril Salesiano, Catholic, co-educational
- Club de Conquistadores Adventistas (Pathfinders), affiliated to Pathfinders international, Adventist
- Scouts Armenios de Argentina, an Armenian Scouts-in-Exile association (see also Hayastani Azgayin Scautakan Sharjum Kazmakerputiun)
- Plast Scout Organization of Ukraine, Ukrainian Scouts in Argentina.
- Organization of Russian Young Pathfinders (ORYuR), a Russian Scouts-in-Exile group in Córdoba, Argentina
- Hashomer Hatzair Buenos Aires
- USTA Argentina affiliated to the Unión de Scouts Tradicionales de América (USTA)

Apparently there are also smaller, regional organizations, most of them also Catholic. There is a significant number of independent groups and other youth movements practising the Scout method among them Liga de Aventureros, Exploradores de Don Orione and Exploradoras de María Auxiliadora.

=== Extinct or merged Scout associations in Argentina ===
The Association of Scouts de Argentina, founded in 1912 by Francisco Pascasio Moreno as the "Argentine Association Boy Scouts" and later known as the National Association of Boy Scouts Argentinos, Argentinos Boy Scouts", declared then "National Institution of Scouting Argentino" by presidential decree Dr. Hipólito Yrigoyen in 1917 and also known as the Scout Association National Institute Argentino ", all names in the same indistinct legal entity, was dissolved on December 1 of 1996 to join Scouts from Argentina Asociación Civil. The Union Scouts Católicos Argentinos (USCA) was created on April 7, 1937 was dissolved on December 1 of 1996 to join Scouts of Argentina Asociación Civil. Scouting Argentino (Mo.Sc.A.) was a brief split in the National Institution of Scouting Argentino (INSA) and then returned to join it. There was also a scout group of Scouts called the local Poles in exile. Which then joined the National Institution of Scouting Argentino (INSA) ( 'also see Harcerstwa Zwiazek Polskiego).

Extinct or merged Scout associations in Argentina include the two that united to form the Scouts de Argentina in 1996, INSA (1912–1996), and USCA (1937–1996). Prior to 1996, Polish Scouts-in-Exile also existed in Argentina as part of INSA (see also Związek Harcerstwa Polskiego).

=== International Scout units in Argentina ===
In addition, there are American Boy Scouts in Buenos Aires, linked to the Direct Service branch of the Boy Scouts of America, which supports units around the world.

== See also ==
- Scouts de Argentina
- Scouting in the Antarctic
