= Cape Valavielle =

Cape in the South Orkney Islands, Antarctica

- Cape
- Coordinates: 60°41′S 44°32′W

Cape Valavielle is a cape marking the north end of Watson Peninsula on the north coast of Laurie Island, in the South Orkney Islands.

It was charted and named by the French expedition, 1837–1840, under Captain Jules Dumont d'Urville.
