= Jougla Point =

Headland in Antarctica

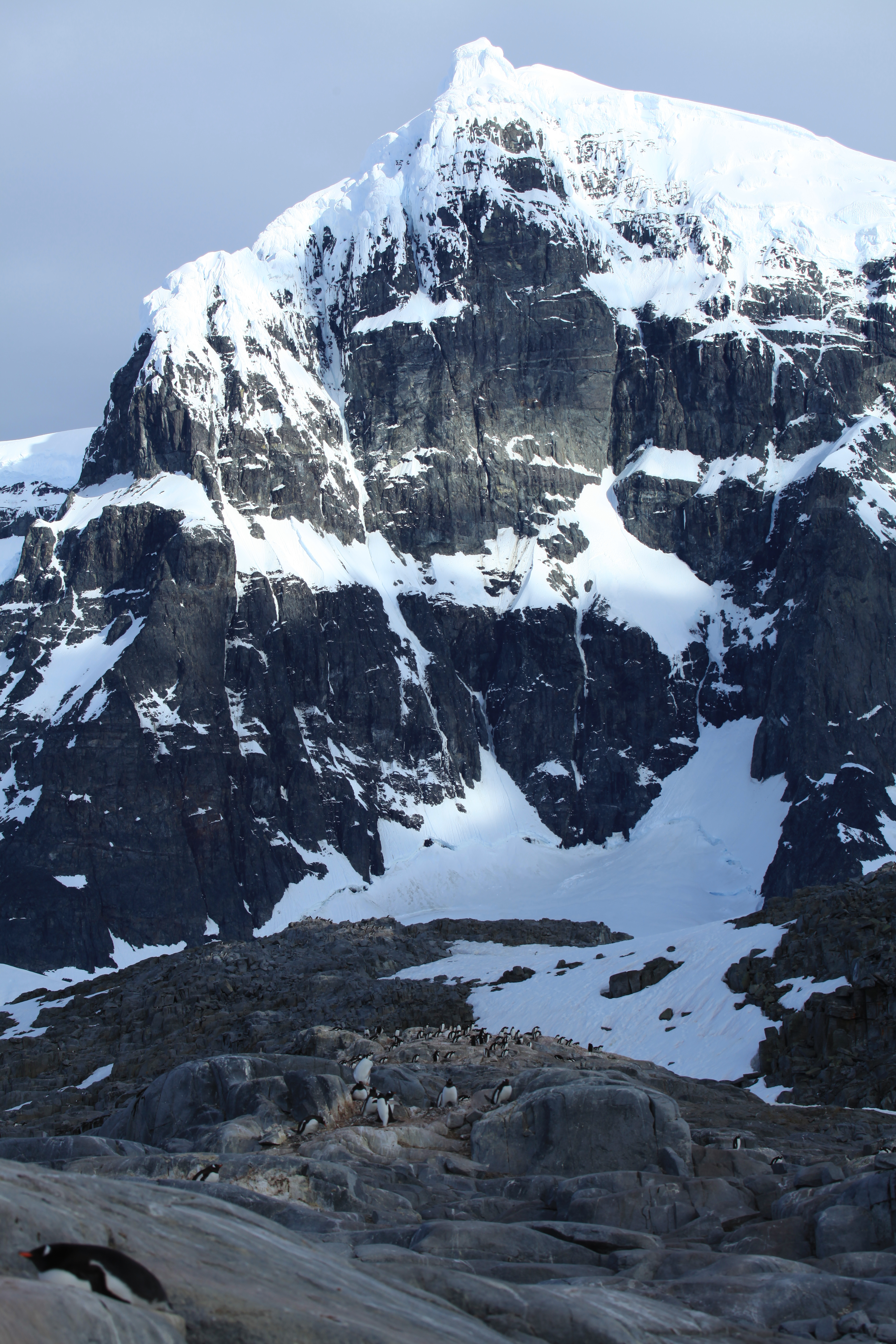
Gentoo penguin nests dot the landscape at Jougla Point, with the mountains of Wiencke Island in the background.

Jougla Point (64°50′S 63°30′W) is a point forming the west side of the entrance to Alice Creek in Port Lockroy, lying on the west side of Wiencke Island, in the Palmer Archipelago, Antarctica. It was discovered and named by the French Antarctic Expedition, 1903–05, under Jean-Baptiste Charcot, who considered it to be a peninsula. Because of its small size the term point is considered more appropriate.
