= Asociación Guías Argentinas =

- Association of Argentine Guides
- Country: Argentina
- Founded: 1953
- Membership: 4,500+
- Affiliation: World Association of Girl Guides and Girl Scouts
- Website https://www.wagggs.org/es/our-world/asociacion-guias-argentinas/

The Asociación Guías Argentinas (Association of Argentine Guides, AGA) is the national Guiding organization of Argentina. It serves more than 4,500 members (as of 2023). The organization founded in 1953 became an associate member of the World Association of Girl Guides and Girl Scouts in 1957 and a full member in 1963.

== Program ==
=== Program sections ===
The association is divided in five sections according to age:

- Ages 5 to 6: Pimpollito (Rosebud) / (Rainbows)
- Ages 7 to 9: Alita (Little Wing) / (Brownies)
- Ages 10 to 12: Guía en Caravana (Caravan Guide) / (Guides)
- Ages 13 to 15: Guía del Sol (Sun Guide) / (Rangers)
- Ages 15 to 18: Guía Mayor (Senior Guide)

And there is a sixth one named Mariposas (Butterflies) for girls and young women between 10 and 25 years old who have special educational needs derived from a disability and who have joined the group after applying the standard admission protocol for these cases.

=== Girl Guide Motto ===
The mottos of the sections are:

- Pimpollitos: Siempre alegre (Always happy)
- Alitas: Siempre Mejor (Always better)
- Guías en Caravana/Mariposas: Siempre Lista (Always ready/Be Prepared)
- Guías del Sol: Siempre Adelante (Always forward)
- Guías Mayores: Servir (To serve)

=== Girl Guide Promise ===
"Yo, (...), siendo fiel a mí misma y a mis creencias, prometo hacer todo lo posible para construir una sociedad mejor, ayudar a los demás en toda circunstancia y vivir según la Ley Guía."
I, (...), being true to myself and my beliefs, promise to do everything I can to build a better society, help others under any circumstances and live accordingly to the Girl Guide Law.

=== Girl Guide Law ===
1. La Guía es honesta y confiable. (The Girl Guide is honest and trustworthy.)

2. La Guía es reflexiva, crítica y responsable. (The Girl Guide is thoughtful, critical and responsible.)

3. La Guía es solidaria y se involucra en su entorno. (The Girl Guide is supportive and gets involved with her surroundings.)

4. La Guía se respeta a sí misma y valora la diversidad. (The Girl Guide respects herself and values diversity.)

5. La Guía es amable y atenta. (The Guide is nice and kind.)

6. La Guía se reconoce como parte de la naturaleza y protege el medio ambiente. (The Girl Guide sees herself as part of Nature and protects the environment.)

7. La Guía es activa y busca superarse a sí misma. (The Girl Guide is active and seeks to improve herself.)

8. La Guía es optimista y enfrenta las dificultades con serenidad. (The Girl Guide is optimistic and faces up to conflict with serenity.)

9. La Guía hace uso consciente y sostenible de todos los recursos. (The Girl Guide practices efficient and sustainable utilization of resources.)

10. La Guía es auténtica y actúa de acuerdo a sus valores y creencias. (The Girl Guide is genuine and behaves in accordance with her values and beliefs.)
