= Association Nationale des Guides de Guinée =

National Guiding organization of Guinea

- National Guide Association of Guinea
- Country: Guinea
- Membership: 4,889
- Affiliation: World Association of Girl Guides and Girl Scouts

The Association Nationale des Guides de Guinée is the national Guiding organization of Guinea. In 2018, there were 4,889 members. The girls-only organization became a full member of the World Association of Girl Guides and Girl Scouts in 2014.

== See also ==
- Association Nationale des Scouts de Guinée
