= Guides du Bénin =

National Guiding organization of Benin

- Girl Guides of Benin
- Country: Benin
- Founded: 1960
- Membership: 1,533
- Affiliation: Scoutisme Béninois, World Association of Girl Guides and Girl Scouts

The Guides du Bénin (Girl Guides of Benin) is the national Guiding organization of Benin. Guiding in Benin started in 1954, the association was founded in 1960 and became a member of the World Association of Girl Guides and Girl Scouts (WAGGGS) in 1963. The girls-only association has 1,533 members (as of 2003). It is affiliated to Scoutisme Béninois, the national member of the World Organization of the Scout Movement.

== History ==
The first Guide patrols in then-Dahomey developed in Porto-Novo in 1954. Two years later, the first Guide camp was held and the movement spread to Cotonou. When the association was official founded in 1960, all three sections were introduced. In 1963, the Guides du Bénin became an associate member of WAGGGS. In the following years, membership numbers stagnated, and the association was only granted full membership in WAGGGS in 2005.

== Program ==
=== Sections ===
The association is divided into three sections, according to the age of the members:

- Jeanettes (Brownies) - ages 8 to 11
- Guides (Girl Guides) - ages 11 to 16
- Guides âinées (Ranger Guides) - ages 16 and older

=== Promise, law and motto ===
The Guide Promise of the Guides du Bénin has the following wording:

Sur mon honneur je m'engage à servir Dieu et mon pays en toute circonstances, à aider mon prochain et à observer la loi des guides.
On my honour, I undertake to serve God and my country in all circumstances, to help other and to keep the Guide Law.

The Guide Law of the Guides du Bénin:

1. La Guide n'a qu'une parole.
  A Guide keeps her word.
2. La Guide est loyale.
  A Guide is loyal.
3. La Guide est utile à ses parents, ses camarades et son pays.
  A Guide is useful to her parents, friends and country.
4. La Guide est l'amie de tous.
  A Guide is a friend to all.
5. La Guide est courtoise et sait obéir.
  A Guide is courteous and knows how to obey.
6. La Guide découvre la nature et la protège.
  A Guide learns about Nature and protects it.
7. La Guide est toujours de bonne humeur.
  A Guide is always good-tempered.
8. La Guide est économe et travailleuse.
  A Guide is thrifty and hardworking.
9. La Guide est propre dans ses pensées, ses paroles et ses actes.
  A Guide is pure in her thoughts, her words and her deeds.
10. La Guide est civiquement consciente et sert les intérêts du peuple béninois.
  A Guide is a responsible citizen and acts for the good of the people of Benin.

The Guide Motto is Toujours prêt!, Always Prepared in French.
