= Fédération Ivoirienne du Scoutisme Féminin =

National Guiding organization of Côte d'Ivoire

- Ivory Coast Federation of Female Scouting
- Country: Ivory Coast
- Founded: 1937
- Membership: 1,900
- Affiliation: World Association of Girl Guides and Girl Scouts

The Fédération Ivoirienne du Scoutisme Féminin (Ivory Coast Federation of Female Scouting) is the national Guiding organization of Côte d'Ivoire. It serves 1,900 members (as of 2008). Founded in 1937, the girls-only organization became a full member of the World Association of Girl Guides and Girl Scouts in 1963.

Members of the federation are:

- Guides catholiques de Cote d'Ivoire
- Eclaireuses laïques de Cote d'Ivoire
- Eclaireuses unionistes de Côte d'Ivoire

== See also ==
- Fédération Ivoirienne du Scoutisme
