= Mackintosh Cove =

Mackintosh Cove (60°42′S 44°30′W) is a cove immediately southeast of Fraser Point along the north coast of Laurie Island, in the South Orkney Islands, Antarctica. It was charted in 1903 by the Scottish National Antarctic Expedition under William S. Bruce, and was named for Neil A. Mackintosh, then a member of the Discovery Committee zoological staff, by Discovery Investigations personnel on the Discovery II following their survey of the South Orkney Islands in 1933.
