= Association Nationale des Scouts de Guinée =

National Scouting association of Guinea

- National Scout Association of Guinea
- Country: Guinea
- Founded: 1984
- Membership: 10,592
- Affiliation: World Organization of the Scout Movement

The Association Nationale des Scouts de Guinée, the national Scouting association of Guinea, became a member of the World Organization of the Scout Movement first in 1990 and again in 2005, after a break in membership. Scouting was officially founded in 1984. The association has 10,592 members (as of 2008).

The Association Nationale des Scouts de Guinée consists of several sub-associations, among them the Association des Scouts Catholiques de Guinée (Catholic Scout Association of Guinea).

The Scout Motto is Sois Prêt (Be Prepared) in French.

== See also ==
- Association Nationale des Guides de Guinée
