= Cape Dundas =

Cape Dundas (60°44′S 44°24′W) is the easternmost point of Laurie Island, in the South Orkney Islands. It was sighted by Captain James Weddell on January 12, 1823, and named by him in honor of the illustrious Dundas family.
