= Alice Creek =

Cove in Antarctica

Alice Creek (64°50′S 63°29′W) is a cove forming the southernmost portion of Port Lockroy, Wiencke Island, in the Palmer Archipelago of Antarctica. It was discovered by the French Antarctic Expedition, 1903–05, under Jean-Baptiste Charcot, and named by him for the wife of Édouard Lockroy, Vice President of the French Chamber of Deputies who assisted Charcot in obtaining government support for the expedition.

The most outstanding local feature is known as Knife Edge Ridge, bounding the western edge of Alice Creek, and forms the point where the glacier turns into the inner harbour region of Port Lockroy. Being composed of ice and snow, this feature changes shape and position from time to time, meaning no accurate position may be recorded. It is for this reason that the name has no official adoption.
