= Firaisan'ny Skotisma eto Madagasikara =

National Scouting federation of Madagascar

- Country: Madagascar
- Founded: 1959
- Membership: 85,000
- Affiliation: World Organization of the Scout Movement

The Firaisan'ny Skotisma eto Madagasikara, the national federation of three Scouting organizations of Madagascar. Scouting in Madagascar was started in 1921 under the auspices of the respective French organizations. The federation was founded in 1959 and became a member of the World Organization of the Scout Movement in 1960. The coeducational Firaisan'ny Skotisma eto Madagasikara has 14,905 members as of 2011.

Members of the federation are

- Antilin'i Madagasikara (Catholic, boys only)
- Kiadin'i Madagasikara - Éclaireuses et Éclaireurs de Madagascar (interreligious, coeducational)
- Tily eto Madagasikara - Protestant Scouts of Madagascar, boys only

The two latter organizations are also members of the Skotisma Zazavavy eto Madagasikara - Fédération du Scoutisme Féminin de Madagascar, the national Guiding federation, which is a member of the World Association of Girl Guides and Girl Scouts.

All three associations in this Federation are community development oriented and there are several development centers in the capital and the provinces.

Scouts take an active part in rural education and help with instruction in adult literacy classes. They also help during national disasters, undertaking relief projects, rescuing farmers during flooding, and rounding up cattle to move them to high land.

The Scout Motto is Sois Prêt (Be Prepared) or Toujours Prêt (Always Prepared) in French, depending on the organization.

== Emblems ==
The Scout emblems of each association incorporate the national colors of the flag of Madagascar, and indicate which French Scouting association they are associated with.

== See also ==
- Skotisma Zazavavy eto Madagasikara
