= Les Scouts du Cameroun =

- Scouts of Cameroon
- Country: Cameroon
- Founded: 1973
- Membership: 8,859
- Affiliation: World Organization of the Scout Movement

Les Scouts du Cameroun is the national Scouting organization of Cameroon. Scouting in Cameroon was started in 1937. The association was founded in 1973 through the merger of five predecessors. Cameroonese Scouting became a member of the World Organization of the Scout Movement in 1971. The coeducational "Scouts du Cameroun" has 8,859 members as of 2021.

Scouting in Cameroon is noted for its emphasis on community service, good citizenship and many conservation projects.

In 1981, Solomon T. Muna was awarded the Bronze Wolf, the only distinction of the World Organization of the Scout Movement, awarded by the World Scout Committee for exceptional services to world Scouting.

== Program ==
The organization is divided in four sections according to age:

- Louveteaux (Cub Scouts) - ages 6 to 11
- Éclaireurs (Scouts) - ages 11 to 15
- Scouts aînés (Senior Scouts) - ages 15 to 19
- Routiers (Rover Scouts) - ages 19 to 26

The Scout Motto is Sois Prêt (Be Prepared) in French.

== See also ==
- Association des Guides du Cameroun
