= Scoutisme Béninois =

National scouting organization of Benin

- Beninese Scouting
- Country: Benin
- Founded: 1932
- Membership: 8,873
- Affiliation: World Organization of the Scout Movement
- Website scoutdubenin.org

Scoutisme Béninois is the national Scouting organization of Benin. Scouting in Benin started around 1930 and became a member of the World Organization of the Scout Movement in 1964 under the previous name Dahomey. Its Girl Guide branch, the Guides du Bénin, is a member of the World Association of Girl Guides and Girl Scouts.

The coeducational Scoutisme Béninois has 8,873 members as of 2021.

In 1977, Ernest Mehinto was awarded the Bronze Wolf, the only distinction of the World Organization of the Scout Movement, awarded by the World Scout Committee for exceptional services to world Scouting.

== Activities ==
Scouts carry out literacy campaigns and offer courses in childrearing. They are involved in community projects such as digging wells, anti-malaria campaigns, building village schools and developing modern farms where children may spend several weeks learning to read and grow food.

The Market Center of Ouidah, which was established by the Scouts more than 20 years ago, trains young people in agricultural skills, thus helping to reverse the exodus towards the cities. Benin Scouts have also engaged in a cattle farm project in the southern forest region of the country, raising healthy cattle despite the threat of disease spread by tsetse fly.

A workshop has been held on "New Energies". As a result, Scouts are now building and showing others how to build cooking stoves that use 90 percent less fuel than open fires.

== Sections ==
- Louveteaux/Louvettes - ages 6 to 12
- Eclaireurs/Eclaireuses - ages 11 to 16
- Compagnons/Compagnes - ages 15 to 19
- Routiers/Guides - ages 18 to 35

The Scout Motto is Sois Prêt, Be Prepared in French.
