= Scouts de Argentina =

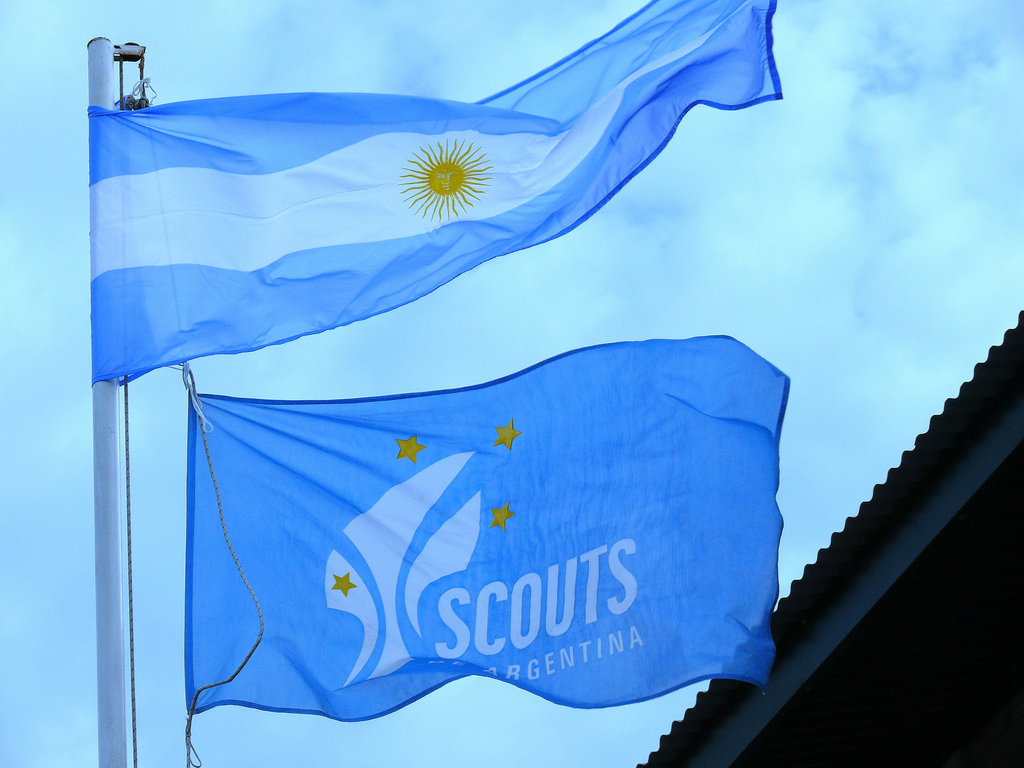
- The Scouts of Argentina and the national flag of Argentina together
- Headquarters: Buenos Aires
- Country: Argentina
- Founded: 1912; 114 years ago
- Founder: Francisco Moreno
- Membership: 75,000
- President National Chief Scout: María Luján Peciña
- Vice President: Alfredo Berteloot
- Affiliation: World Organization of the Scout Movement
- Website scouts.org.ar

Scouts de Argentina Asociación Civil (Scouts of Argentina Civil Association) is one of the national Scouting associations of Argentina. It was founded by Perito Francisco Moreno with the name "Boy Scouts Association Argentinos" and subsequently known as the "National Association of Boy Scouts Argentinos", "Boy Scouts Argentinos", then declared "National Institution of Argentine Scouting" by presidential decree Dr. Hipólito Yrigoyen in 1917. It is also known as "Argentine Scouting National Institute"; all these indistinct names refer to the same organization.

Scouts of Argentina is a non-profit aimed at non-formal education, one of the scouts associations in Argentina with national scope and multi-faith guidance, formed by the merger of the USCA (Argentine Catholic Scouts Union) and the Association of Scouts of Argentina.

USCA and INSA were dissolved on December 1, 1996, to join Scouts of Argentina, Civil Association.

== History ==
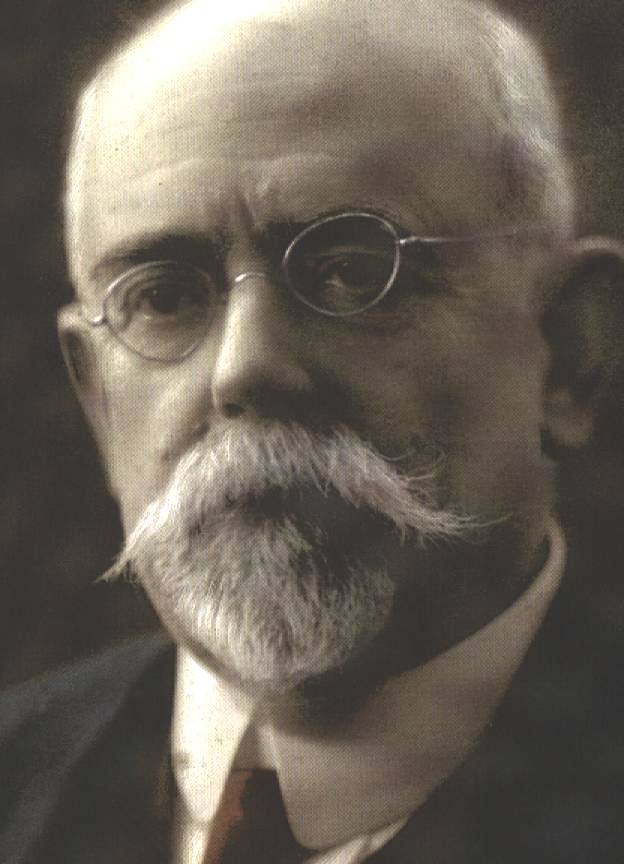
Francisco Moreno, founder

Scouting was officially founded by explorer and academic Perito Francisco Moreno in 1912, shortly after the publication of "Scouting For Boys" in Spanish, which was granted a National Charter in 1917, and was among the charter members of the World Organization of the Scout Movement in 1922. Scouts de Argentina has 75,000 members as of 2020.

A Scout patrol of Anglo-Argentine students greeted Baden-Powell on his way to visit Brazil, Uruguay, Argentina and Chile in 1908. In the late 1930s, a Catholic Scout Union (USCA) was created under the sponsorship of the Roman Catholic Church and operated separately until December 2, 1996, when INSA and USCA merged to form the Scouts of Argentina.

In the mid-1990s there were two major Scout associations in Argentina:

- Argentina Scout Association (INSA, also known as ASA), recognized by the World Organization of the Scout Movement
- Argentine Catholic Scouts Union (USCA), an entity sponsored by the Catholic Church

In 1980, there were talks to agree on a federation of the two organizations, but they succumbed to differences between the leaders of the associations, and restarted further talks in 1991 under the auspices of the Interamerican Scout Region (World Organization of the Scout Movement).

In 1995, as a result of these discussions, they created a Constitution Committee which aimed to draft a merger of both associations to agree on a common educational project and establish convergence in education and land.

As one of the partnerships was an organization of the Catholic Church, the Argentine Episcopal Conference in early 1996 tried to make the adoption of Terms of Reference for the unification, although each Bishop reserves the right to form a private association in their jurisdiction if they consider that it would weaken the identity of Catholic Scouts in its two key aspects, "Faithfulness to the Scout Movement and fidelity to the Catholic doctrine. As part of these agreements, the USCA set aside a private association of the Catholic Church through the establishment of a "Scout Catholic Pastoral Committee" (COPASCA). The COPASCA assumed a supra-institution in the new partnership that arises from the unit.

On December 1, 1996, the Argentine Catholic Scouts Union (USCA) and the Association of Scouts of Argentina (ASA) merged, and a joint National Assembly was held in the town of Ezeiza on the grounds of the Textile Workers Union (SETI) next to the Matanza River.

As a result of the merger, the organization became Scouts of Argentina, the name of the new unified association.

In December 2016, the Catholic Archdiocese of La Plata announced that it will no longer sponsor Scouts of Argentina, because the organization has strayed from Christian values.

== Characterization ==
It is an educational organization composed of girls, children, youth and adults.

== Program ==
The definition of Youth Program groups in Scouts of Argentina takes place in different stages.

- Transition: Since the merger of USCA and INSA to 2000 the Scout Groups were phased out the program of the association from which they came.
- Educational Renewal Stage: named the period beginning in April 2000 when the executive director approved the publication of 'Notes for the Scout Game' I and II and 'Notes for the leader of the Walkers and Rover Scout Branches'. For Cub Scout and Scouts Branches adopting publications by Interamerican Scout Region (World Organization of the Scout Movement).
- Stage Review: The year 2002 a national consultation began called the Program Conference. As a result of this consultation, they detected a number of implementation problems that required changes to the program. As the Director of the Youth Program, Rodrigo González Cao started Indaba, which ended in 2008, with modifications to the following four branches:

=== Scout Sections ===
- Lobatos/Lobeznas - Manada - ages 7 to 10

On this section, kids participate of activities and learn the basics skills to prepare them to join the Unidad. The environment is thematically oriented after Rudyard Kipling's "The Jungle Book". The troop leaders are named after characters of the book like Bagheera, Baloo, Akela, Kaa, Kotick, Raksha and Rikki-Tikki-Tavi. Manada literally means pack, for pack of wolves. The children are called "Lobatos y Lobeznas", wolf cubs, representing the wolves from the book. When going on camping trips the Manada usually sleeps in one big tent as a group.

- [Scouts - Unidad] - ages 10 to 14

The Unidad is the main phase of the scouting experience. Kids are divided into small groups of about 4-7 people that are named after native animals of Argentina. Girls and boys are separated when forming these small groups as they will later sleep together as groups in one tent during the camping trips. The scouts will learn most of their skills in this phase. Activities are mostly organized in a competitive way between the different small groups called "Patrullas", patrols. The camping trips usually include a long-term competition that lasts the whole trip. Each patrol has a guide and sub-guide that take decisions as well as designated roles to be occupied by the members while on camping trips or during meetings. The guides and sub-guides themselves for their own patrol for special events where they meet guide-patrols from other scout groups.

- Caminantes - ages 14 to 18

Caminantes is the phase were the scouts leave the competing units to work as one group and develop more as individuals. On this phase the meetings are no longer heavily organized by the troop leaders and the scouts have more freedom to do as they please. Their camping trips last a bit longer than those in the Unidad and are characterized by them being trecking trips where the scouts carry their own gear while walking long stretches from place to place.

- Rovers - ages 18 to 22

=== Symbolism and progression ===
Also, any Scout Groups could participate in the Sea Scouts option.

Books written by Robert Baden-Powell, 1st Baron Baden-Powell in which underpin the Youth Programme and Scout method are:

- Cub Scout: The Wolf Cub's Handbook
- Scouts: Scouting for Boys
- Rovers: Rovering to Success

And the general guidelines for tasks of the adult leaders were presented in Aids to Scoutmastership.

The Scout Motto is Siempre Listo (Always Prepared).

The Scout emblem incorporates the color scheme of the flag of Argentina.

== Scout Promise ==
The Committee on Constitutions of the World Scout Movement, adopted in 1999, the words of the Scout Promise to Argentina:

I, ... (name), promise on my honor and with the grace of God to do all that I can do to fulfill my debts to God, my country, to others and against myself, to always help my fellow men and to live the Scout Law.

The Confessional Religious Commissions, in accordance with their respective terms of reference or preliminary agreements, "may include additional terms in the text of the Pledge and determine a badge that identifies them to be used on the uniform by members who profess their faith, in accordance with any international educational agencies Scouts of Argentina and respecting the methodological guidelines that are handed down.

- Catholics: I (...), my honor and with the grace of God I promise to do everything in my power to fulfill my duty to God, the Church, the country, with others and myself, helping others and living Scout Law
- Evangelical Christians: I (...), my honor and with the grace of God I promise to do everything in my power to fulfill my duty to God, the Church, the country, with others and myself, helping others and live the Scout Law
- Buddhists: I (...), and taking refuge in the triple gem by my honor I promise to do everything in my power to fulfill my duties to my Buddhist faith, the Fatherland, with others and myself, helping others and living Scout Law
- Latter Day Saint movement (Mormons), I (full name) on my honor I promise to do everything in my power to fulfill my duties to God, country, to others and myself, helping others and living Scout Law
- Jews (...), on my honor I promise to do everything in my power to fulfill my duties to Gd, the Torah, the country, with others and myself, helping others and living the Scout Law

== Scout Law ==
The text of the Scout Law Scout Argentina was adapted from the original formulation of Robert Baden-Powell to the current youth language. As the new wording contains the expression of the three scout principles, incorporating the duties to the profession of religious faith was not present in the proposed Act by B-P. The final text was drafted in the National Conference of Commissioners held in Puerto Pibes, City of Buenos Aires in July 1998, and ratified by the National Assembly In October of that year. Then the Committee on Constitutions of the World Scouting Organization approved it in 1999 .

1. A Scout loves God and lives his/her faith fully.
2. A Scout is loyal and worthy of all trust.
3. A Scout is generous, courteous, and shows solidarity.
4. A Scout is respectful
5. A Scout defends and values the family.
6. A Scout loves and defends life and nature.
7. A Scout knows how to obey; he/she chooses and acts with responsibility.
8. A Scout is optimistic even through difficult times.
9. A Scout is economic, hard-working, and respectful of others' goods and properties.
10. A Scout is pure and leads a healthy life.

== National Structure ==
- National Assembly: Define policies
- Directive Board: Defining lines of action
- Executive Committee: Perform action lines
- Zone: province representation
- District: territorial division structure, apply policies and actions and support of the Scout Groups
- Scout Group: Application scenario of the Scout Method and fundamental part of the partnership structure.

== Ephemerides ==
In Argentina it is customary to celebrate the Scout Good Turn Day every year on September 5 . In some cases, the scouts collect food for the homeless. But it has recently been extended to assemble in the city's square with a fleur de lis and disposable plastic bottle caps. The recyclable material is then donated to children's hospitals to take care of children with complex health problems. One of the major benefitting organizations is the Juan Pedro Garrahan National Pediatric Hospital Foundation.

== Community Action ==
Scouts of Argentina has signed national, provincial and municipal various initiatives to promote peace education and prevent youth addictions. Among them are:

- Play for Peace Program: awarded by the Government of the Autonomous City of Buenos Aires, declared parliamentary interest by the Argentine Chamber of Deputies, by the Municipality of Rosario, Santa Fe and by the Senate of the Santa Fe Province.
- Addiction prevention by the Government of the Autonomous City of Buenos Aires.

== See also ==
- Scouting and Guiding in Argentina
