= Port Lockroy =

Harbor on Wiencke Island in the Antarctic Peninsula

Coordinates: 64°49′31″S 63°29′40″W

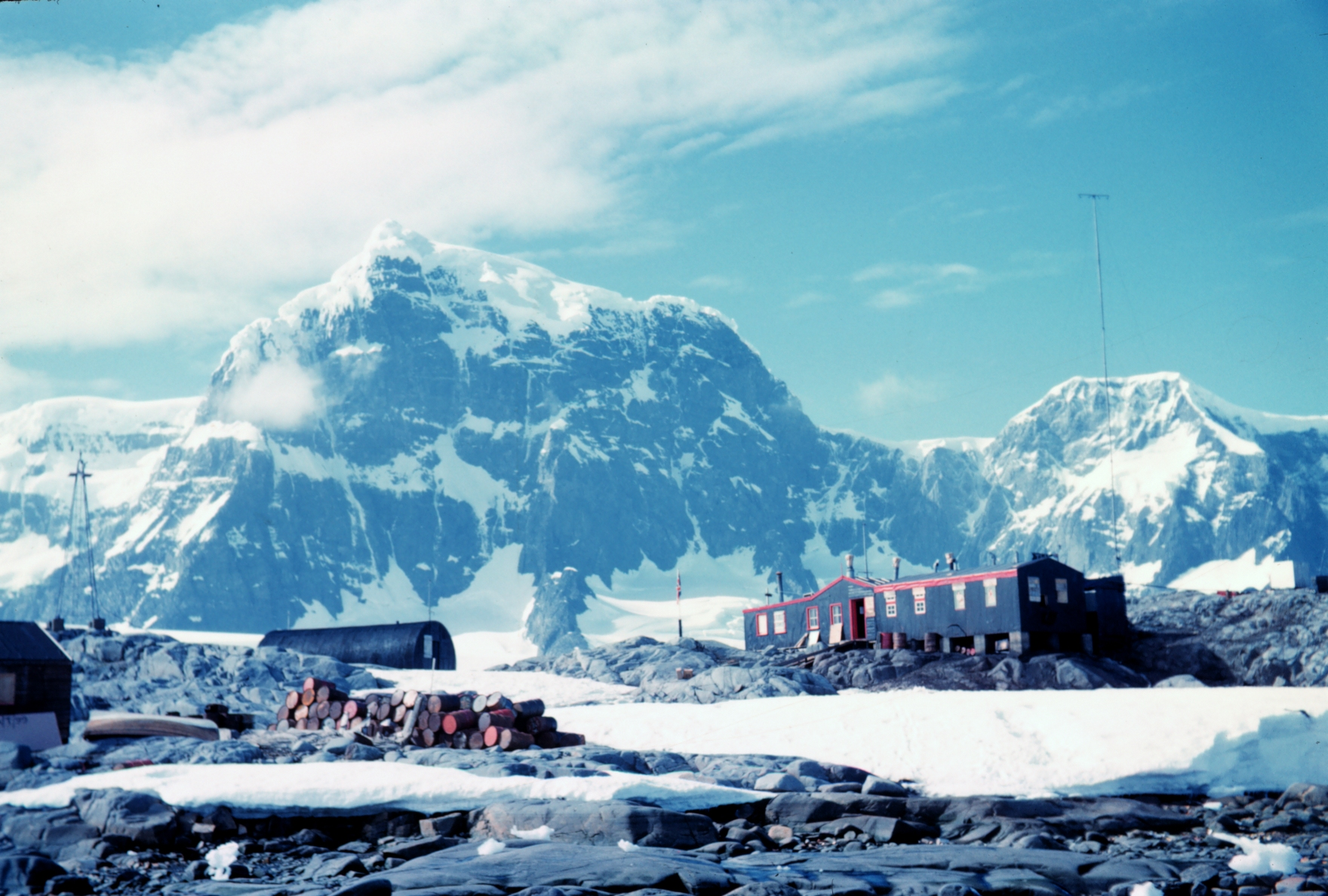
The abandoned British base at Port Lockroy, 1962

Location of Port Lockroy

Port Lockroy is a bay forming a natural harbour on the north-western shore of Wiencke Island in the Palmer Archipelago to the west of the Antarctic Peninsula. The Antarctic base with the same name, situated on Goudier Island in this bay, includes the most southerly operational post office in the world. The base was left unstaffed from 2020 to 2022 due to the COVID-19 pandemic, though the museum house remained open to individual visits. On 4 October 2022 it was announced that a team of four women had been chosen to return to open the base for the summer 2022/23 season.

Goudier Island in 2014

== History ==
The bay was discovered in 1904 and named after Edouard Lockroy, a French politician and Vice President of the Chamber of Deputies, who assisted Jean-Baptiste Charcot in obtaining government funding for his French Antarctic Expedition. The harbour was used for whaling between 1911 and 1931. During World War II, the British military Operation Tabarin established the Port Lockroy Station A on tiny Goudier Island in the bay, which continued to operate as a British research station until January 16, 1962.

In 1996 renovation of the Port Lockroy base buildings was begun by staff from the British Antarctic Survey, funded by the Government of British Antarctic Territory. The United Kingdom Antarctic Heritage Trust took over management and conservation of the site in 2006 and operates a museum and post office (affectionately known as the 'Penguin Post Office') staffed in the Antarctic summer, usually November–March.

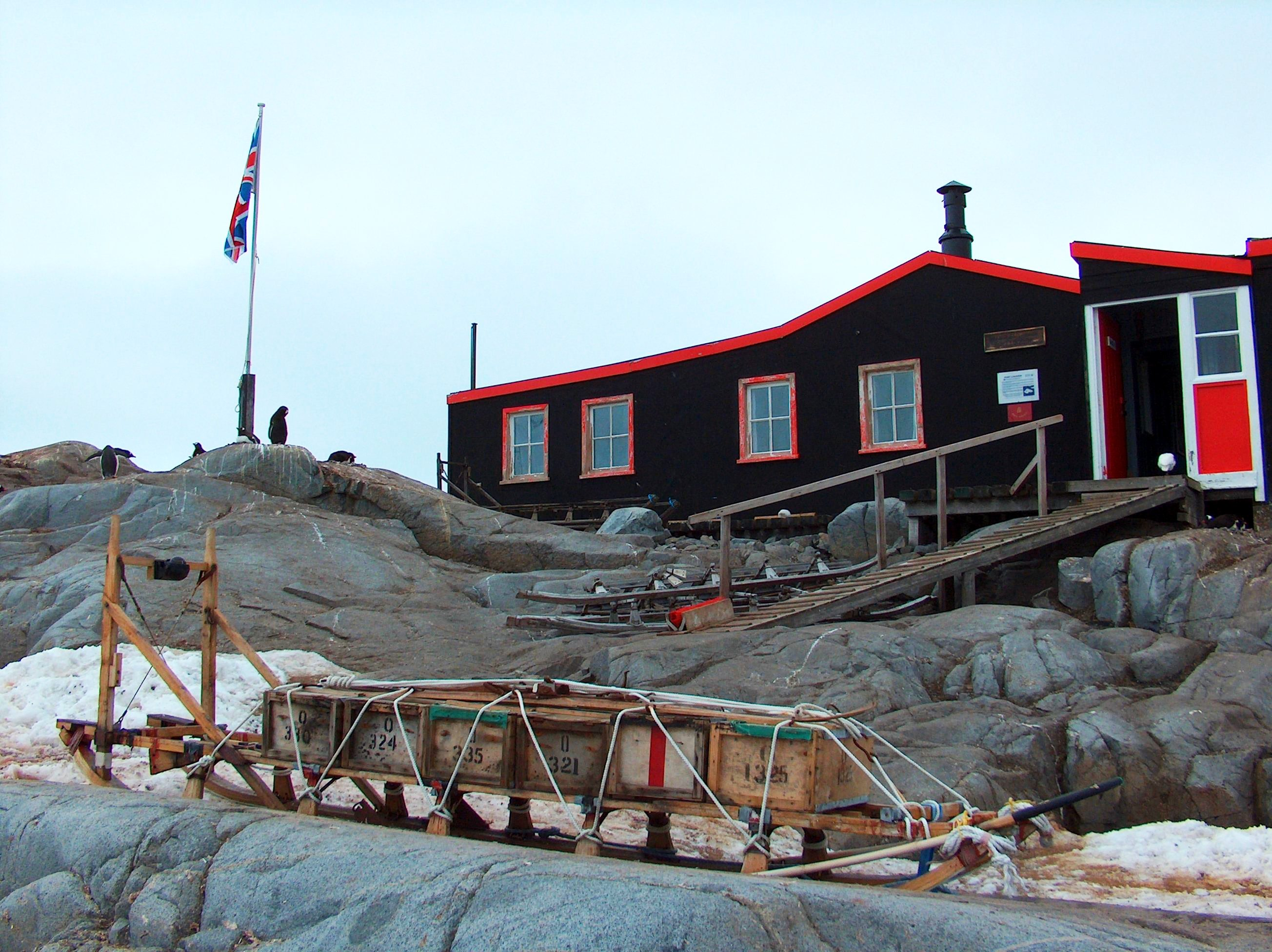
The base has been renovated into a museum

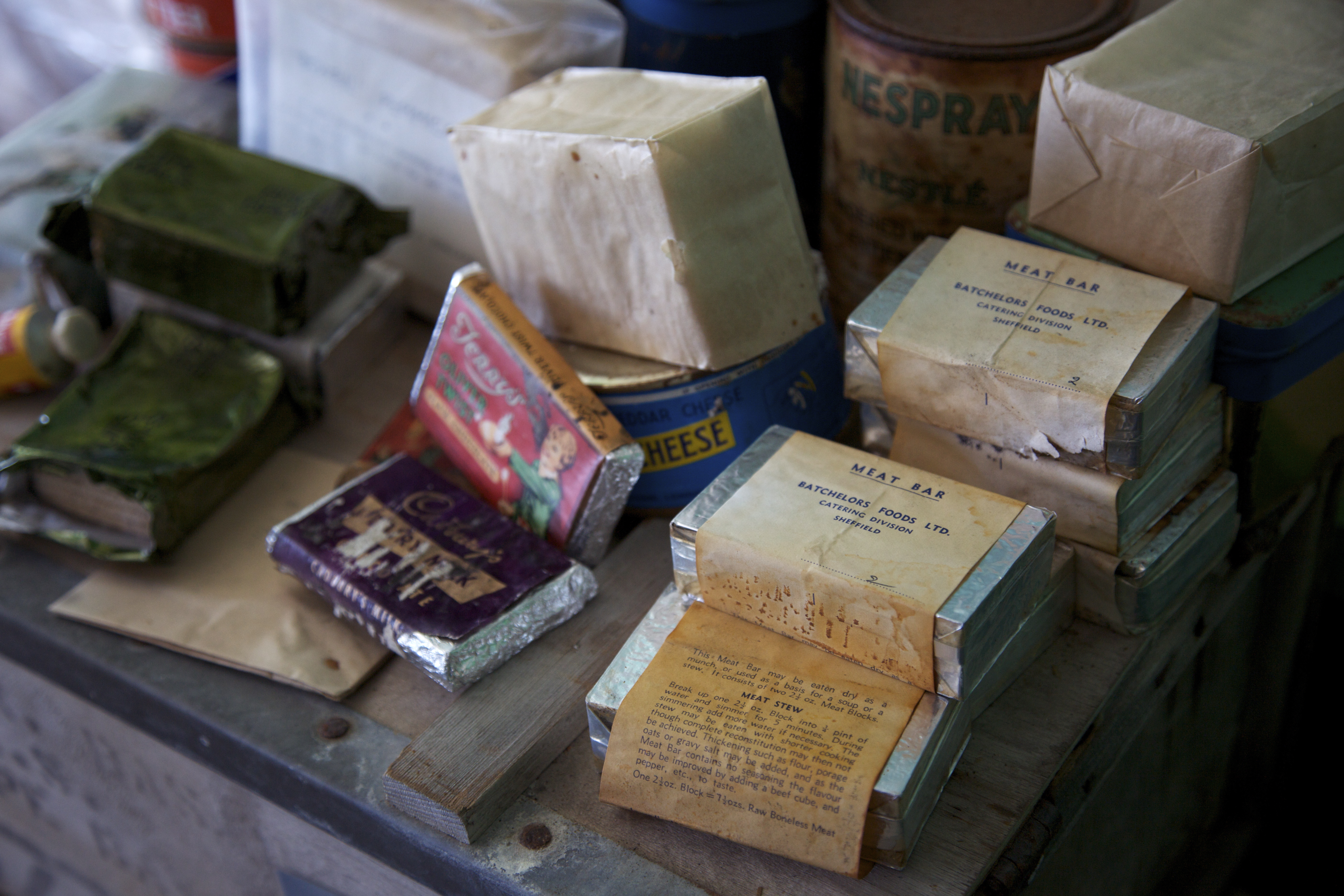
Food rations on display at the museum

It is one of the most popular tourist destinations for cruise-ship passengers in Antarctica. Proceeds from the small souvenir shop fund the maintenance of the site and other historic sites and monuments in Antarctica. The Trust collects data for the British Antarctic Survey to observe the effect of tourism on penguins. Half the island is open to tourists, while the other half is reserved for penguins. A staff of four typically process 70,000 pieces of mail sent by 18,000 visitors that arrive during the five month Antarctic cruise season. A souvenir passport stamp is also offered to visitors.

=== Historic site ===
The historic importance of the site relates to both its establishment as an Operation Tabarin base in 1944, and for the scientific work performed there, including the first measurements of the ionosphere, and the first recording of an atmospheric whistler (electronic waves), from Antarctica. It was also a key monitoring site during the International Geophysical Year (1957). The site has been designated a Historic Site or Monument (HSM 61), following a proposal by the United Kingdom to the Antarctic Treaty Consultative Meeting.

== Features ==
- Jougla Point, forming the west side of the entrance to Alice Creek
- Lécuyer Point, forms the south side of Port Lockroy harbor entrance

== See also ==
- List of Antarctic research stations
- Operation Tabarin
- List of Antarctic field camps
- Crime in Antarctica
