= Fédération Ivoirienne du Scoutisme =

Ivorian Scouting organization

- Ivorian Scouting Federation
- Country: Côte d'Ivoire
- Founded: 1962; 64 years ago
- Membership: 23,213
- Affiliation: World Organization of the Scout Movement
- Website fiscout.org

The Fédération Ivoirienne du Scoutisme (FSI, Ivorian Scouting Federation) is the national federation of three Scouting organizations of the Côte d'Ivoire. The coeducational Fédération Ivoirienne du Scoutisme has 23,213 members as of 2011.

== History ==
Scouting was introduced to Côte d'Ivoire in 1937; the Scout units where part of the respective French associations. After the country's independence in 1960, they formed three faith based associations following the French example. In 1962 these associations formed the Collège Ivoirien du Scoutisme which was renamed to Fédération Ivoirienne du Scoutisme in 1963. The federation became a member of the World Organization of the Scout Movement on September 23, 1972.

== Component associations ==
The Federation consists of five Scout associations

- the Roman Catholic Association des Scouts Catholiques de Côte d'Ivoire (Association of Catholic Scouts of Côte d'Ivoire)
- the laic Eclaireurs Laïcs de Côte d'Ivoire (Scouts of Côte d'Ivoire)
- the Protestant Eclaireurs Unionistes de Côte d'Ivoire (Unionist Guides and Scouts of Côte d'Ivoire)
- the Muslim Scouts Musulmans de Côte d'Ivoire (Muslim Scouts of Côte d'Ivoire)
- the evangelical Eclaireuses et Eclaireurs Évangéliques de Côte d’Ivoire (Evangelical Scouts and Guides of Côte d'Ivoire).

== Program ==
Scouting in the Ivory Coast has an emphasis on community service. There is a great deal of activity in local Scouting and a good record of social action, especially in the development of youth and cultural centers for the vocational training of young people.

Age groups within the associations are governed by the respective organization. The ASCCI uses a five sections system:

- Petite enface (Early childhood) - ages 4 to 7
- Louveteaux (Cub Scouts) - ages 8 to 12
- Eclaireurs (Scouts) - ages 12 to 15
- Cheminots - ages 15 to 18
- Routiers (Rover Scouts) - ages 18 to 21.

== Motto ==
The Scout Motto is Sois Prêt (Be Prepared) or Toujours Prêt (Always Prepared) in French, depending on the organization.

== Emblems ==
Each of the Scout emblems incorporate elephant tusks, representing the ivory of the country's name.

Association des Scouts Catholiques de Côte d'Ivoire

== See also ==
- Fédération Ivoirienne du Scoutisme Féminin
