= Operation Tabarin =

Secret British expedition to the Antarctic during WWII

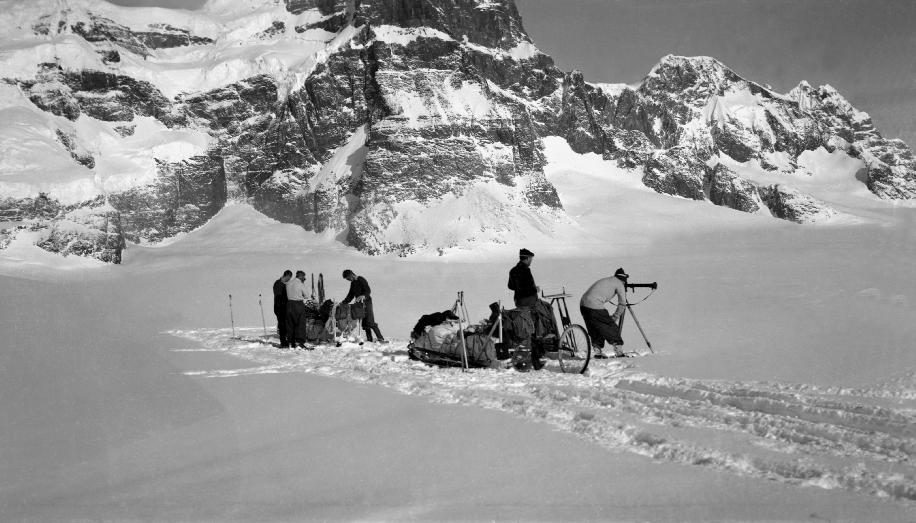
Field party of Operation Tabarin surveying on Wiencke Island, 22 September 1944

Operation Tabarin was the code name for a secret British expedition to the Antarctic during World War Two, operational 1943–1946. Conducted by the Admiralty on behalf of the Colonial Office, its primary objective was to strengthen British claims to sovereignty of the British territory of the Falkland Islands Dependencies (FID), to which Argentina and Chile had made counter claims since the outbreak of war. This was done by establishing permanently occupied bases, carrying out administrative activities such as postal services and undertaking scientific research. The meteorological observations made aided Allied shipping in the South Atlantic Ocean.

Following Cabinet approval in January 1943, there was an intensive period of planning, recruitment and procurement, before the expedition left the UK in November 1943, led by Lieutenant-Commander James Marr. Two bases were established in early 1944 – firstly, Base B, at Deception Island, South Shetland Islands, and later the main base, Base A, at Port Lockroy, Wiencke Island. A variety of science and mapping work was carried out. 14 men over-wintered in 1944.

In the Antarctic summer of 1944/45, Captain Andrew Taylor became leader, following the resignation of Marr due to ill health. A base hut was built on Coronation Island, South Orkney Islands (Base C) but not occupied. Base D, Hope Bay, Trinity Peninsula, was established as the centre for the expedition's second year. The resupply of the bases included men, supplies and equipment, together with 25 sled dogs to extend field work on the mainland of the Antarctic Peninsula. A full programme of science and mapping was undertaken. 21 men over-wintered in 1945.

The expedition was relieved in March 1946 by members of the newly formed Falkland Islands Dependencies Survey (FIDS). FIDS had been established in July 1945, following the end of the War in Europe, to put the work started by Operation Tabarin on a permanent footing. In 1962 FIDS was re-named the British Antarctic Survey (BAS), following Britain's ratification of the Antarctic Treaty and the creation of British Antarctic Territory.

Operation Tabarin established the first British permanently-occupied stations in the Antarctic and, in commencing geology, biology and mapping, was the foundation for continuous British scientific research in Antarctica. The huskies provided the core of a British Antarctic husky population, used for survey journeys, that lasted until 1994.

== Background ==
Following the outbreak of World War II, Allied shipping across the globe became vulnerable to attacks by German Navy commerce raiders and U-boats. The War also threatened to reignite the longstanding Falkland Islands sovereignty dispute with neutral Argentina.

The important trade routes round Cape Horn and the Cape of Good Hope made the waters of the South Atlantic Ocean a particular target, with a corresponding threat to the Falkland Islands and its Dependencies. In January 1941, the German cruiser Pinguin attacked the unarmed and unescorted Norwegian whaling fleet. Pinguin seized a haul of 20,320 tons of whale oil, one of the largest prizes seized by a commerce raider during the war.

In response, the British authorities sent the armed merchant cruiser Queen of Bermuda to patrol the area between South Georgia, the South Shetland Islands and Weddell Sea. On 5 March, Queen of Bermuda visited the abandoned Norwegian Hektor Whaling Station in Whalers Bay, Deception Island, which was a well known safe harbour, destroying stocks of coal and oil, and associated equipment, to prevent them from falling into enemy hands.

The entry of Japan into the war in December 1941 increased the threat, with fear that Japan might seek to seize the Falkland Islands as a base in the South Atlantic. The Islands' defences were minimal and approaches to the USA for support were unsuccessful, though endorsed by the British prime minister, Winston Churchill.

In January 1942, Argentina's Comisión Nacional del Antártico dispatched the transport ARA Primero de Mayo to Deception Island, afterwards sailing to the Melchior Islands, Palmer Archipelago and Winter Island. Argentine flags were raised in these locations and all territories south of 60° S and between 25° W and 68.34° W were declared annexed.

On 28 January 1943 a meeting of the War Cabinet, chaired by Clement Attlee considered Foreign Office proposals to address what were seen as mounting Argentine encroachments on British territory. These were to dispatch the armed merchant cruiser HMS Carnarvon Castle to the Dependencies to make landings, carry out administrative activities and remove marks of Argentine claims, and, crucially, to establish permanently occupied bases at strategic locations. Both were approved.

Upon reaching Deception Island, Carnarvon Castle replaced the Argentinian flag with the Union Jack and placed four British Crown Land signs. A month later Primero de Mayo returned and duly replaced the Union Jack with the Argentinian flag. The British concluded that occupation was indeed necessary to end these tit-for-tat tactics.

=== Planning and preparation ===
In May 1943, following a number of interdepartmental meetings, planning started for an expedition to occupy sites in the Falkland Islands Dependencies (FID). A meeting on 27 May set the objective of establishing permanent bases on Deception Island, South Shetland Islands, and on Signy Island, South Orkney Islands, funded through sales of a new FID stamp issue to philatelists, though in the event most costs were met through the Admiralty. During the planning stage the priority for the location of the second base was changed to Hope Bay, since it was on the mainland, with an option to erect a hut on Signy Island if resources allowed. Final instructions were issued in November 1943, clarifying the physical and political objectives, importance of the issuing of stamps, appointment of magistrates and other acts of sovereignty. In the field the expedition was under the authority of the Governor of the Falkland Islands, who received instructions from the Secretary of State for the Colonies.

An Expedition Committee was established in June 1943, chaired by A.B. Acheson, Colonial Office Under-Secretary, with members from the Colonial Office, Foreign Office, Admiralty, Treasury, Crown Agents, Ministry of War Transport and Discovery Investigations.

It was agreed that scientific research and mapping should be undertaken by the expedition and three scientists with significant Antarctic experience were involved. Two joined the committee from the outset: geologist and polar explorer James Wordie, a member of Shackleton's Imperial Trans-Antarctic Expedition and one of the founders of the Scott Polar Research Institute, and Neil Mackintosh, a zoologist and Director of the Discovery Investigations. The third, Brian Roberts, was an ornithologist on the British Graham Land Expedition, who was working with Wordie in the Admiralty Intelligence Department on cold-climate clothing and equipment. He was formally involved after February 1944, when he took up a post at the Foreign Office Research Department. Mackintosh prepared a detailed scientific programme for the shore parties.

The expedition code name 'Tabarin' was acknowledged in October when departments within the Admiralty were informed, though it is likely to have been in use earlier. A hand-written note by Roberts explains that the name, after the Paris night club Bal Tabarin, was chosen because of the amount of night work required and the chaotic organisation. According to some sources the expedition was briefly code named Operation Bransfield, after Royal Navy officer Edward Bransfield. The Forces mail address Naval Party 475 was allocated for the bases to be established, and Naval Party 470 for the expedition ship. The expedition was considered top secret but by April 1944 news of it had leaked out, not least because of the philately work undertaken at the direction of the Colonial Office.

Marine biologist and polar explorer James Marr was selected as leader of the expedition. His experience included participation in Shackleton's last expedition, during 1921–22, as an 18-year old; the British, Australian and New Zealand Antarctic Research Expedition (BANZARE) 1929–30; and as a scientist on the Discovery Investigations 1928–1929, 1931–1933, 1935–1937. At the time of his recall, Marr was serving as a lieutenant in the Royal Naval Volunteer Reserve in the Far East. He arrived in the UK in July 1943 and joined the expedition committee. He was subsequently promoted to Lieutenant Commander.

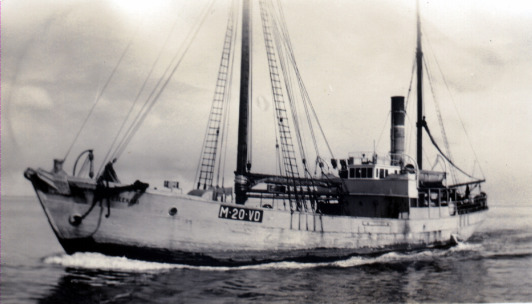
Norwegian sealing vessel Veslekari

Marr's priorities were to find an expedition vessel and recruit suitably experienced volunteers. In the circumstances of war and time constraints it was difficult to find a ship built to navigate through sea ice and with sufficient cargo capacity. He flew to Iceland to inspect a Norwegian sealer Veslekari, built in 1918, that had been used on Arctic expeditions in the past. After further inspection by a surveyor, she was considered suitable, brought to Tilbury, London for a refit and requisitioned by the Admiralty under the name HMS Bransfield. Lieutenant Victor Marchesi, Royal Navy, was appointed as her captain and second-in-command of the expedition. Marchesi had served on the Discovery Investigations with Marr.

Potential recruits were identified by Marr, assisted by Wordie and Mackenzie, and interviewed by him at the Colonial Office in September. Most were serving in the armed forces or the merchant navy, but some were still in civilian roles. Several were well known to them through the Discovery Investigations, including the chief steward Thomas Berry, ship's carpenter Lewis Ashton, senior wireless operator James Farrington, handymen John Matheson and Gwion Davies. Other specialists recruited were surveyor Andrew Taylor, a Canadian with cold-weather experience; medical officer Eric Back; meteorologist Gordon Howkins; botanist Ivan Mackenzie Lamb, then working at the British Museum of Natural History; and two geologists, William Flett, from Glasgow University and Buck, who withdrew from the expedition before it left the UK; and wireless operator Norman Layther, a New Zealander.

== Expedition ==
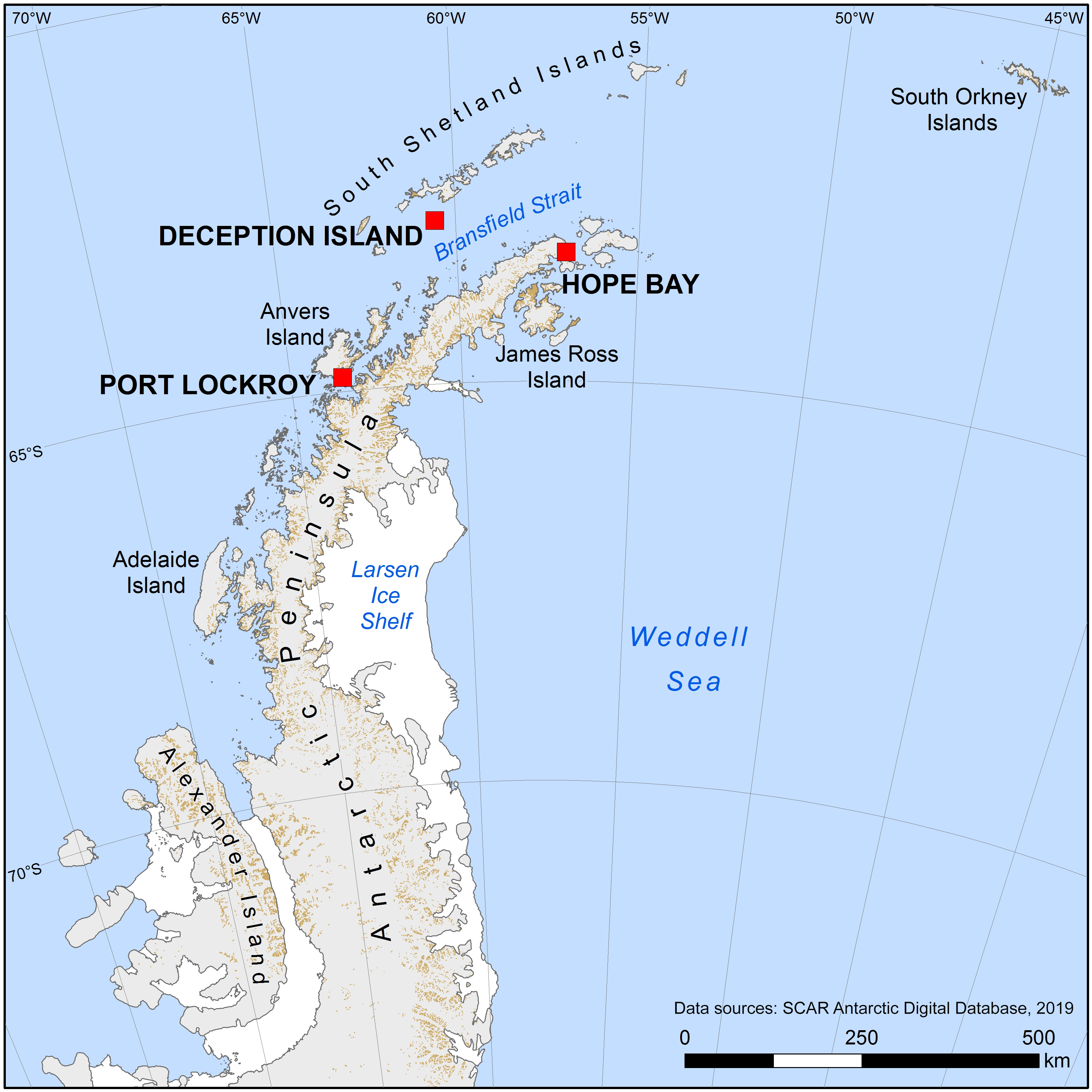
Antarctic Peninsula showing Tabarin bases

By late October all the necessary equipment and stores were packed and assembled at the Royal Albert Dock, London. As the Bransfield was too small to carry the whole load, some of the cargo, including the prefabricated hut, had already been shipped ahead aboard steamships Groix and Ragnhildsholm, and now more stores and two expedition members were allocated to SS Marquesa. Bransfield herself, with the rest of the expedition, was scheduled to sail on 6 November, but was delayed when leaking fresh water tanks had to be replaced.

=== Journey south ===
On 12 November 1943 Bransfield finally sailed from London, joining a small coastal convoy bound for Falmouth. Problems arose almost immediately and she had to put in to Portsmouth for repairs. She continued on 25 November but proved unseaworthy during a gale on the voyage west. Meanwhile, the Marquesa, on leaving Liverpool wharf, had grounded on a submerged wreck and the Tabarin contingent were ordered to re-join the rest of the expedition. Forced to abandon the Bransfield, the expedition was trans-shipped to the troop ship Highland Monarch at Avonmouth in Bristol on 8 December. She was taking a relief garrison to the Falkland Islands and sailed on 14 December, calling at Gibraltar and Montevideo before reaching Port Stanley on 26 January. Waiting for them, to replace Bransfield, was HMS William Scoresby. Built for whale marking work by the Discovery Investigations, she had been requisitioned by the Royal Navy for mine sweeping duties in the South Atlantic during the war. She had very limited cargo capacity but the Falkland Islands Company vessel SS Fitzroy had also been assigned to the expedition to transport cargo and most of the personnel. The Fitzroy had already collected the cargo carried to Montevideo on other vessels.

=== 1st year – Antarctic summer 1943/44 and winter 1944 ===
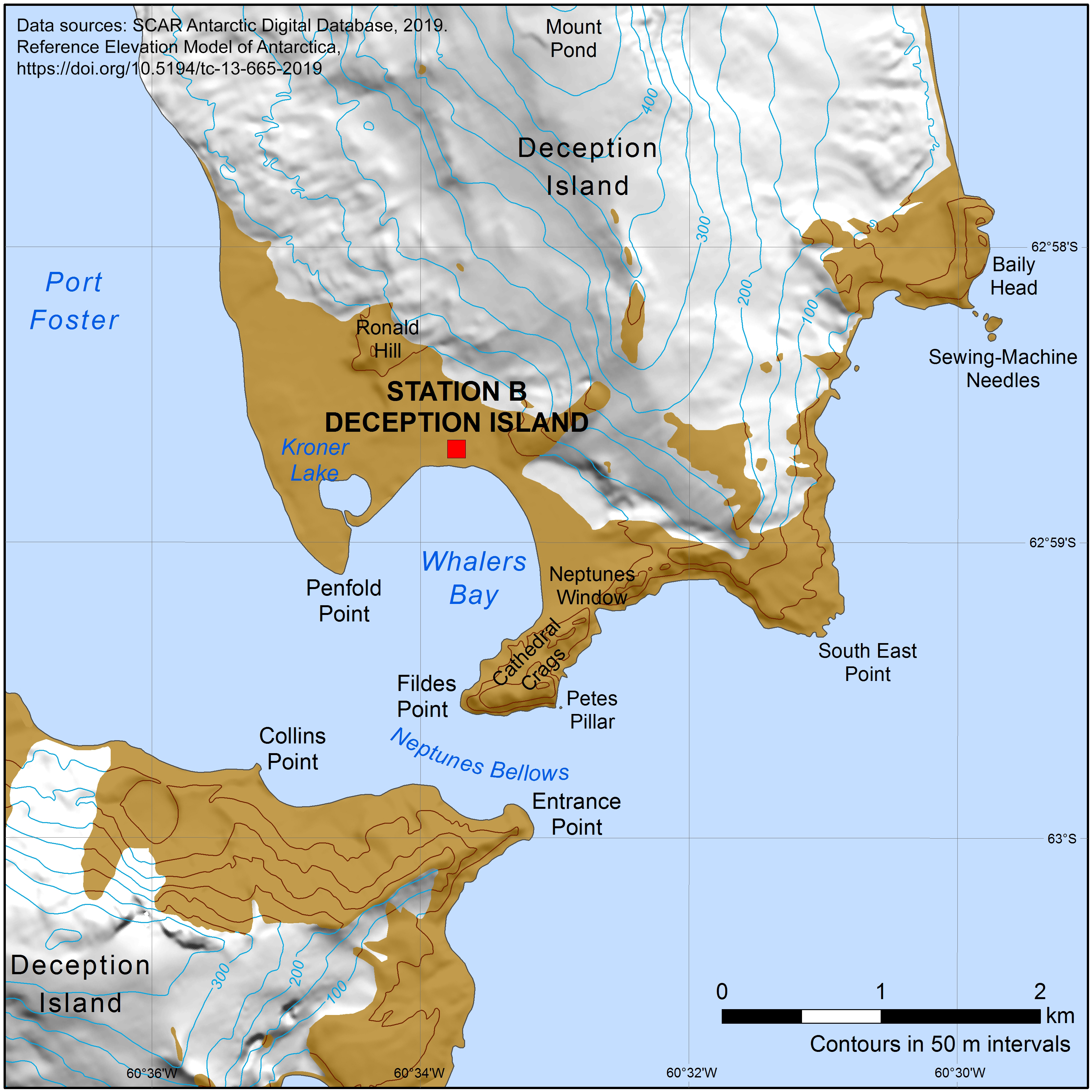
Base B, Whaler's Bay, Deception Island

The two ships left Port Stanley on 29 January. In addition to the expedition, the Fitzroy carried Tim Hooley, his wife and 14-year-old daughter. Hooley was taking up a two-year post as wireless operator for the Government station on South Georgia, and the family were only landed there once the priority objectives of establishing two Tabarin bases was achieved. On 3 February 1944 the expedition arrived at Port Foster, Deception Island. This being the most likely place for Argentine or German vessels to shelter, they were relieved that there were no signs of recent occupation, other than an Argentine flag painted on a fuel tank, which was promptly erased. Few of the buildings were inhabitable, but one of the Hektor Station buildings was selected for Base B. Unloading commenced immediately and by 6 February the two ships were able to depart, leaving geologist Flett as leader of a five-man party.

The expedition sailed for Hope Bay, arriving on 7 February, to find that the approach to the bay from Antarctic Sound was through a 10-mile wide band of pack ice. This posed a risk to the safety of the Fitzroy, which was not ice-strengthened in any way. William Scoresby proceeded through the sea ice and landed a reconnoitering party, but, though urged to follow, the Fitzroy's captain, Keith Pitt, and Captain David Roberts (a representative of the Falkland Islands Company), decided they could not risk the ship. The following day the attempt was reluctantly abandoned and the decision made to proceed south-west along the coast of the Antarctic Peninsula in search of an alternative mainland site. Due to thick fog, it was not until 10 February that the ships left Bransfield Strait and began the search. With Fitzroy now running low on coal and no suitable landing site having been found, Marr agreed that the expedition should make for Port Lockroy, Wiencke Island, a well known safe harbour with several low rocky islets where the base could be built. The two vessels arrived there on the afternoon of 11 February.

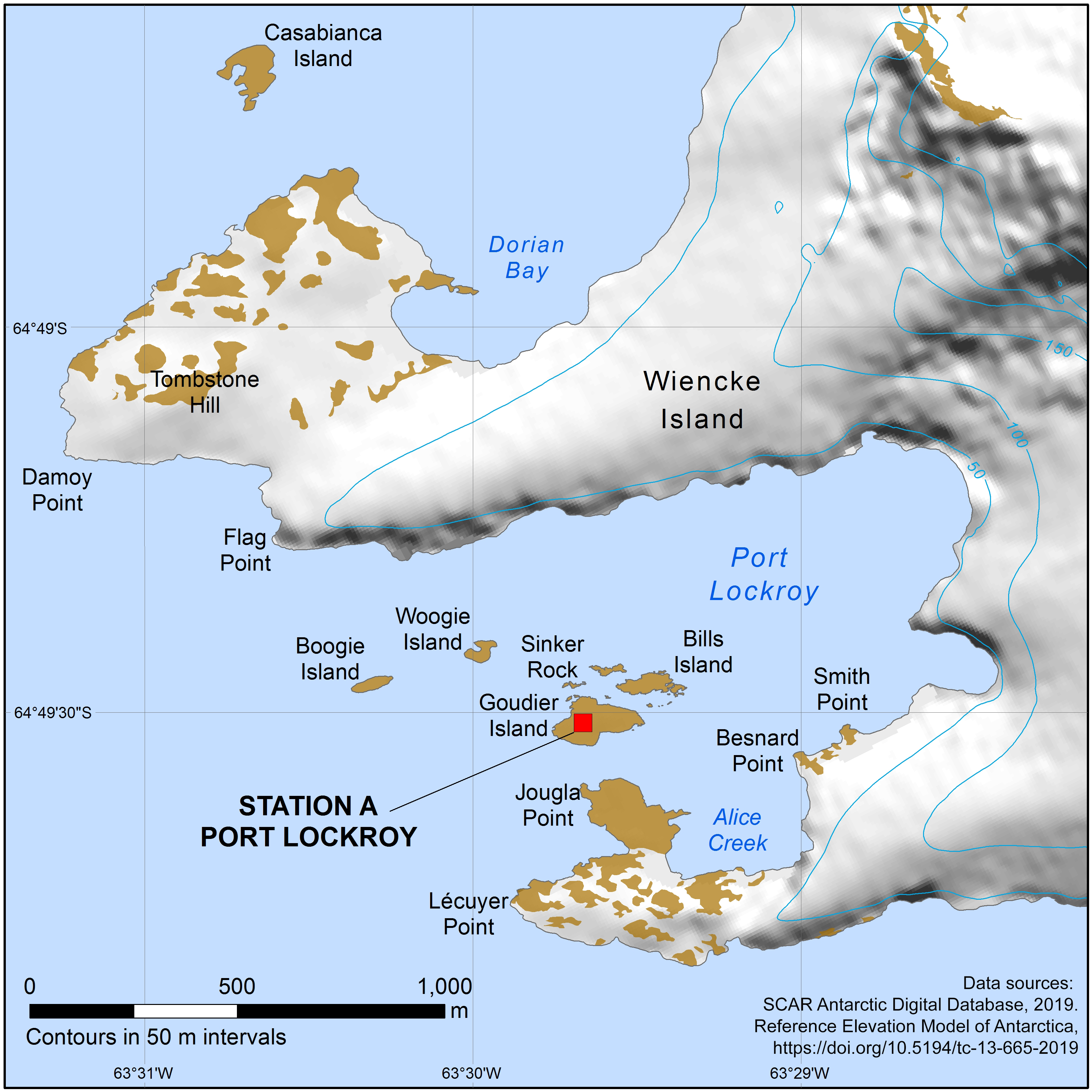
Base A, Port Lockroy, Goudier Island, Wiencke Island

Although long-used by ships visiting the area, Port Lockroy's location restricted the range of scientific activities possible because the Gerlache Strait rarely froze, so cutting off access to the mainland. In addition, as an island location, it was inferior to Hope Bay, on the Peninsula mainland, from the perspective of strengthening British sovereignty, though this was somewhat mitigated by it being so well known. Both these factors added to the pressure Marr was under. Nevertheless, a site for the hut was chosen on Goudier Island, Base A was established, and discharging of cargo began at once. Signs of Argentine territorial claims left by Primero de Mayo were removed.

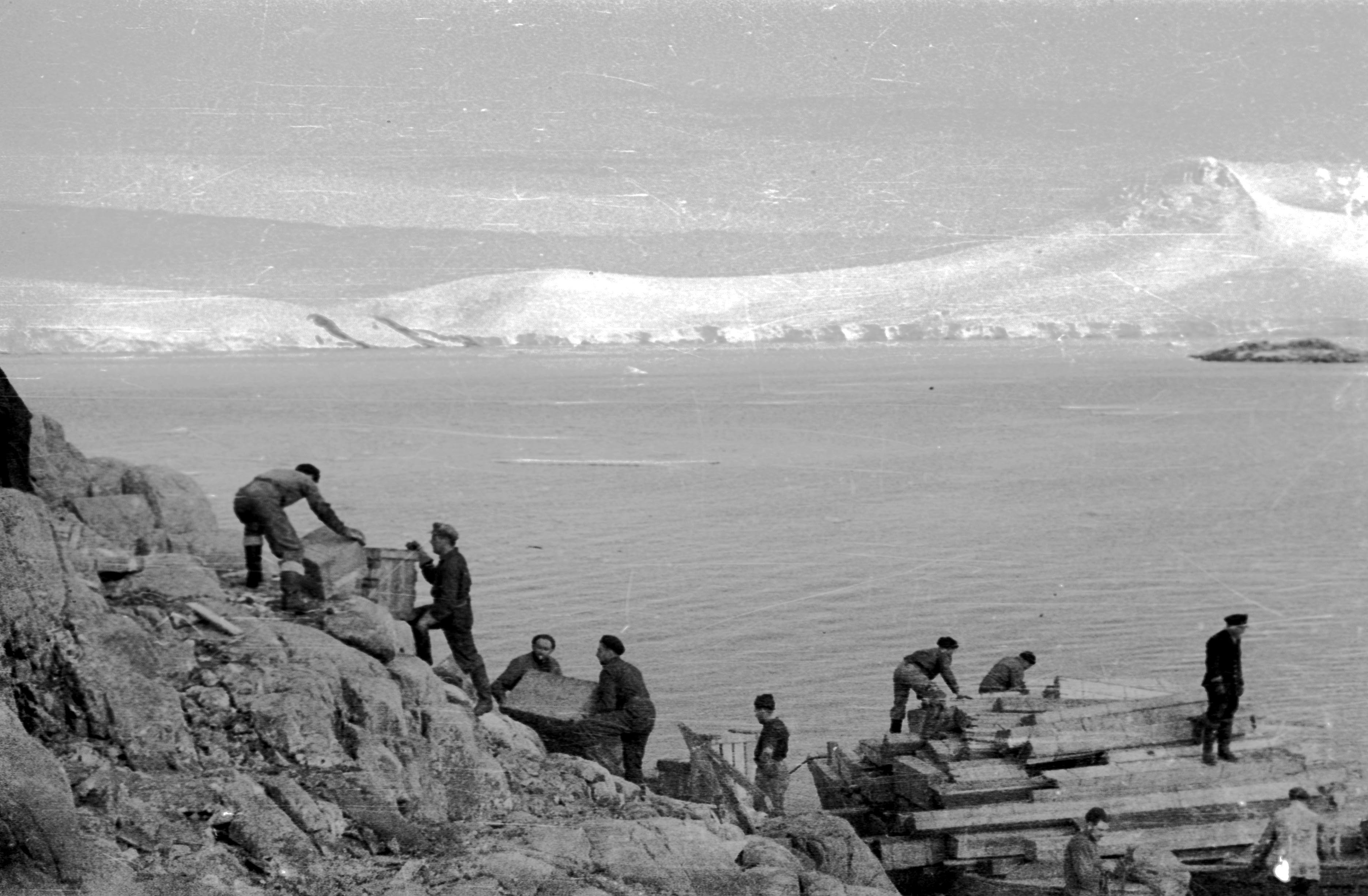
Personnel unload supplies at Port Lockroy in February 1944.

The main hut, named Bransfield House in memory of their original expedition ship, was a prefabricated design by the Norwich firm of Boulton and Paul. On 15 February the generator was successfully installed, enabling wireless communication with Stanley and Base B to be established. Three extensions to the hut were added between February and April, using materials brought from Deception Island or found nearby, and also a Nissen hut for storage. The postmarking of mail at Port Lockroy began on 12 February, indicating the importance given to philatelic duties. Falkland Islands stamps overprinted with the inscription "Graham Land, Dependency of" were used. The William Scoresby and Fitzroy left the new base on 17 February for Base B, Deception Island, before visiting Signy Island, arriving on 20th. A landing was made and a Union flag nailed to a disused whaling hut. Mail was processed using South Orkney overprinted stamps. From there the vessels sailed to Grytviken, South Georgia, where the Hooley family disembarked, before returning to the Falkland Islands, taking official mail.

William Scoresby visited Base A twice more before winter set in. On 19 March she brought Falkland Islander John Blyth, who joined the team as a cook/handyman in place of Blair. On 17 April, she delivered a large quantity of mail to be stamped and cancelled. On 22 April Marr and others were aboard when the vessel visited Cape Renard to erect a Union Jack and British Crown Land sign. Port Stanley Town Hall, in which the Post Office was located, was destroyed by fire on 16 April. In addition to the loss of expedition mail, this compromised the expedition's secrecy as correspondence now passed through Montevideo. Tabarin's existence became known to the outside world through a BBC announcement and press releases on 24 April.

Both bases made meteorological observations, transmitted twice a day to the meteorological station in Stanley, and sea ice observations during the winter. At Deception Island upper air observations were made using meteorological balloons. A geological survey was also undertaken, and aspects of glaciology and physiography observed. At Port Lockroy scientific work began in early May with the collection of rock samples from the foot of Jabet Peak and Savoia Peak. A botanical survey was made by Lamb, mainly of lichens, that included the discovery of a number of unrecorded species, including Verrucaria serpuloides, the then only known true marine lichen, thus making a considerable contribution to the taxonomy of Antarctic lichens. During the winter the nine men practised skiing, prepared equipment for planned field trips and Taylor carried out local mapping work. In September a party of four, man hauling two sledges, undertook a topographic survey of Wiencke Island over 25 days, in challenging terrain and poor weather conditions. As spring advanced Lamb took advantage of the low tides and melting snow to conduct an ecological study of the local beaches, Marr encouraging the others to collect zoological specimens. On 18 November Lamb led a field party back to Blyth Point (on Wiencke Island) to complete his botanical collecting there. Bird and lichen specimens were gathered, the former for the needs of the British Museum (Natural History).

List of Winterers 1944 – British Antarctic Survey – Operation Tabarin List of personnel

Base A, Port Lockroy

- James W.R. Marr – expedition commander, base leader, zoologist
- Lewis Ashton – carpenter
- Eric H. Back – medical officer, meteorologist
- A. Thomas Berry – purser/ storeman
- John Blyth – cook (replaced Kenneth C.G. Blair in March 1944)
- Gwion Davies – handyman, scientific assistant
- James E.B.F. Farrington – senior wireless operator mechanic
- Elke Mackenzie – botanist
- Andrew Taylor – surveyor

Base B, Deception Island

- William R. Flett – base leader, geologist
- Gordon A. Howkins – meteorologist
- Norman F. Layther – wireless operator mechanic
- John Matheson – handyman
- Charles Smith – cook

=== 2nd year – Antarctic summer 1944/45 and winter 1945 ===
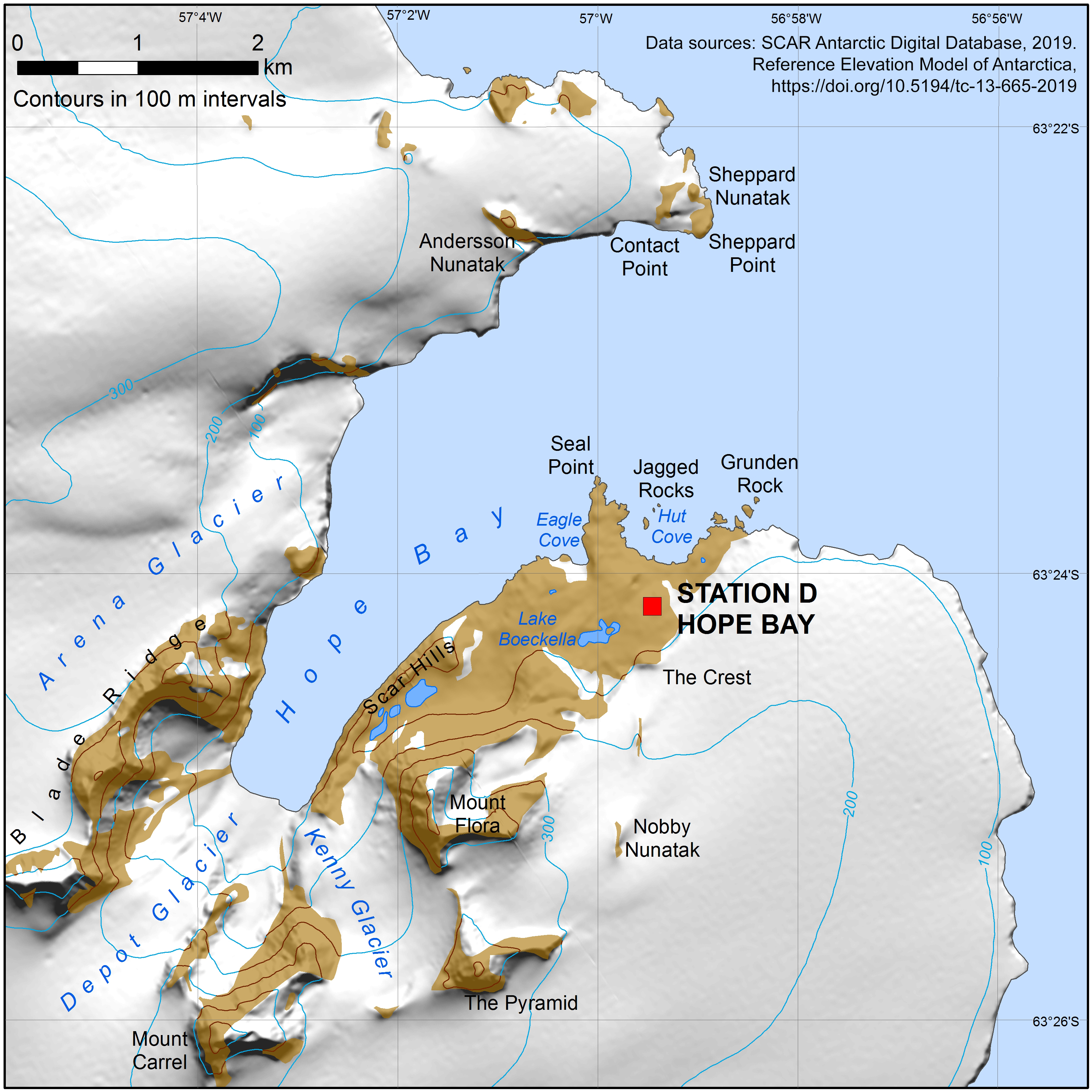
Base D, Hope Bay, Trinity Peninsula

On 6 December, William Scoresby returned to Station B bringing plants native to the Falklands and soil for Lamb to conduct a transplantation experiment, which ultimately failed due to low humidity and strong winds. On 3 February 1945, Fitzroy and the 550 ton sealer Eagle arrived at Port Lockroy, with Victor Russell and David James, Norman Bertram Marshall, Gordon Lockley, Frank White, Alan Reece, Thomas Donnachie and Norman Layther aboard. Stores, equipment and crew members destined for the erection of an unmanned Base E on Stonington Island moved into Eagle, others boarded William Scoresby and Fitzroy in order to build Station D on Hope Bay.

On 7 February, Marr resigned on account of poor health and later returned to the Falklands, with Taylor replacing him as expedition leader. Taylor abandoned the plan to build the Stonington Island station focusing his attention on Station D. On 13 February, Seal Point was selected as the most suitable location for Station D and the first steps for its erection were made, construction was completed on 20 March. On 23 February, a hut was built on Coronation Island to reinforce British claims to the area. Later on the British expedition paid the Argentine meteorological station on Laurie Island a courtesy visit.

A few fossil specimens were collected at Hope Bay in February, with systematic gathering of paleobotanical specimens from Mount Flora's shale beginning on 8 June. A sledging expedition from Hope was launched in August. On 29 December, the sledging party returned to Base D, having visited Vortex Island, Duse Bay, James Ross Island and numerous small islands in its vicinity.

The trip resulted in 250 kilograms (550 lb) of lichen, fossil and rock samples, meteorological and glaciological measurements as well as corrections to Otto Nordenskjöld's maps.

List of Winterers 1945

Base A, Port Lockroy

- Gordon J. Lockley – base leader, meteorologist, zoologist – British Antarctic Survey – Operation Tabarin List of personnel
- John K. Biggs – handyman
- Norman F. Layther – wireless operator mechanic
- Francis White – cook – British Antarctic Survey – Operation Tabarin List of personnel

Base B, Deception Island – British Antarctic Survey – Operation Tabarin List of personnel

- Alan W. Reece – base leader, meteorologist
- Samuel Bonner – handyman
- James E.B.F. Farrington - senior wireless operator mechanic
- Charles Smith - cook

Base D, Hope Bay – British Antarctic Survey – Operation Tabarin List of personnel

- Andrew Taylor – expedition commander, base leader, surveyor
- Lewis Ashton – carpenter
- Eric H. Back – medical officer, meteorologist
- A. Thomas Berry – storeman, cook
- John Blyth – cook
- Gwion Davies – handyman, scientific assistant
- Thomas Donnachie – wireless operator mechanic
- William R. Flett – geologist
- David P. James – surveyor
- Elke Mackenzie Lamb (then known as Ivan Mackenzie Lamb) – botanist
- Norman B. Marshall – zoologist
- John Matheson – handyman
- Victor I. Russell – surveyor

=== 3rd year – Antarctic summer 1945/46 ===
On 14 January 1946, William Scoresby, Fitzroy and 300-ton sealer Trepassey began evacuating the members of the expedition to the Falklands. On 11 February, those serving in the military boarded HMS Ajax (22), and the rest sailed home on Highland Monarch.

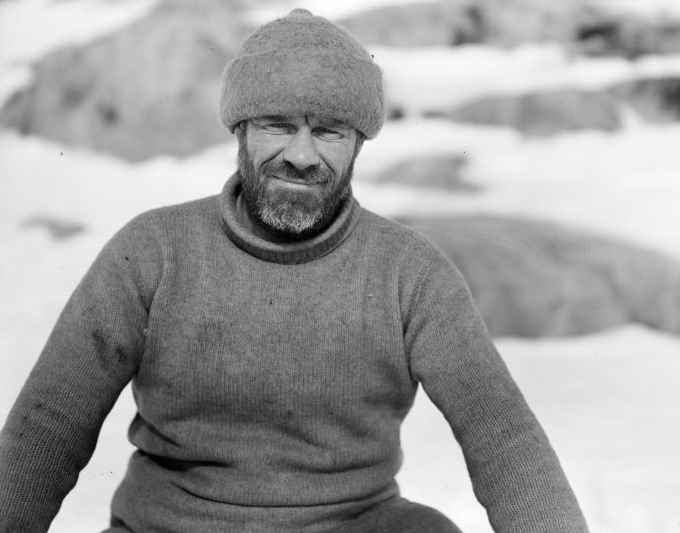
James Marr at Base A, Port Lockroy, 5 Nov 1944

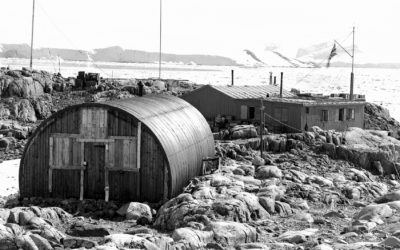
Base A, Port Lockroy, Goudier Islet, Wiencke Island, 6 Jan 1945

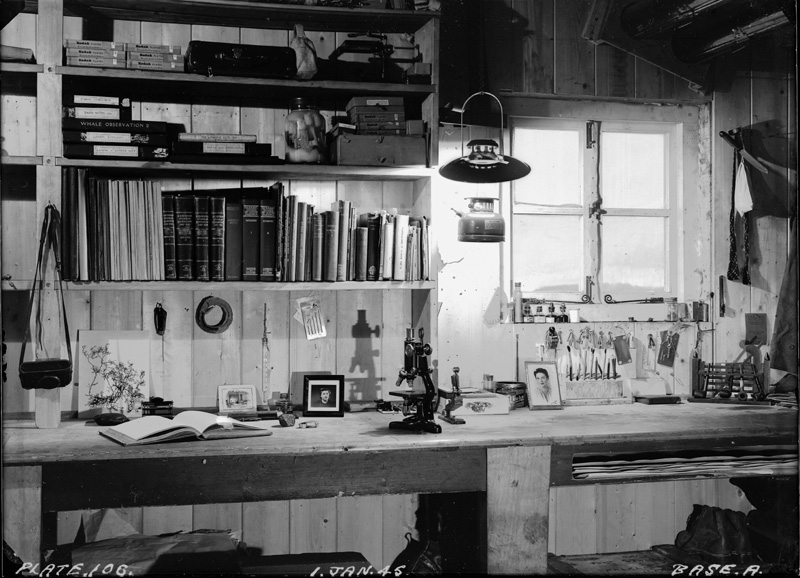
Port Lockroy, laboratory in Bransfield House, Jan 1945

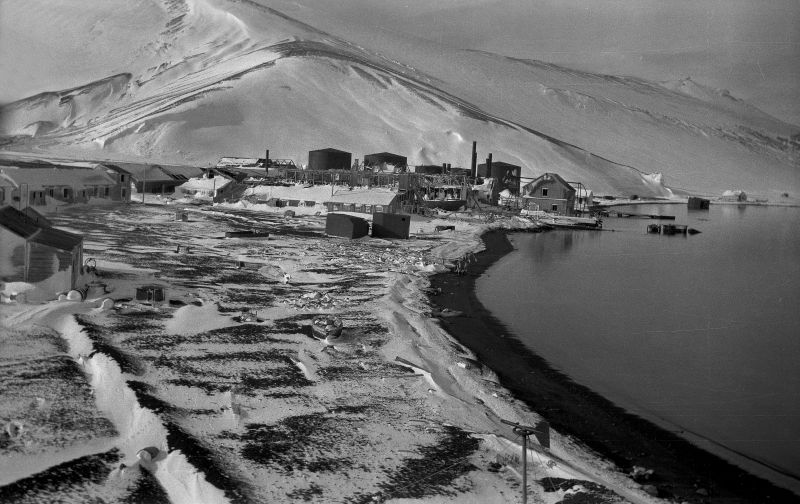
Abandoned Hektor Whaling Station, Deception Island, April 1945. Base B occupied one of the buildings.

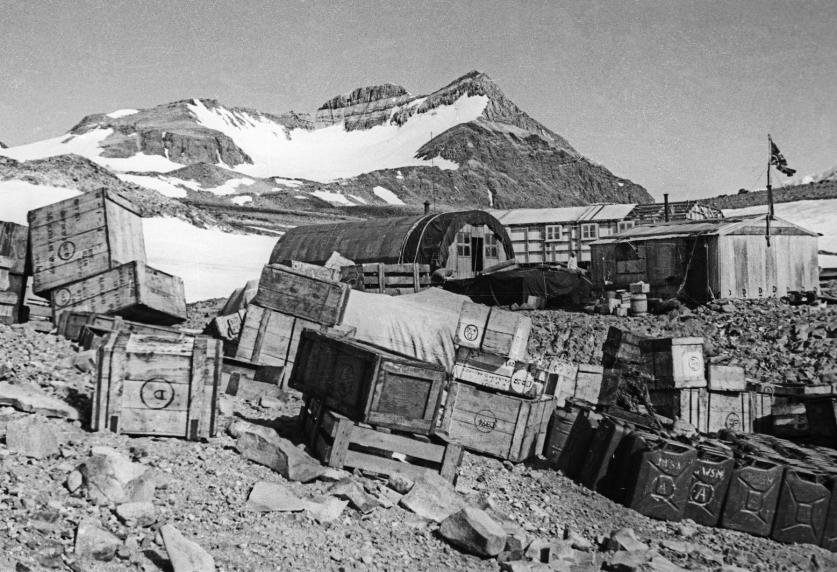
Base D, Hope Bay, under construction, 1 March 1945. Mount Flora behind.

== Aftermath ==
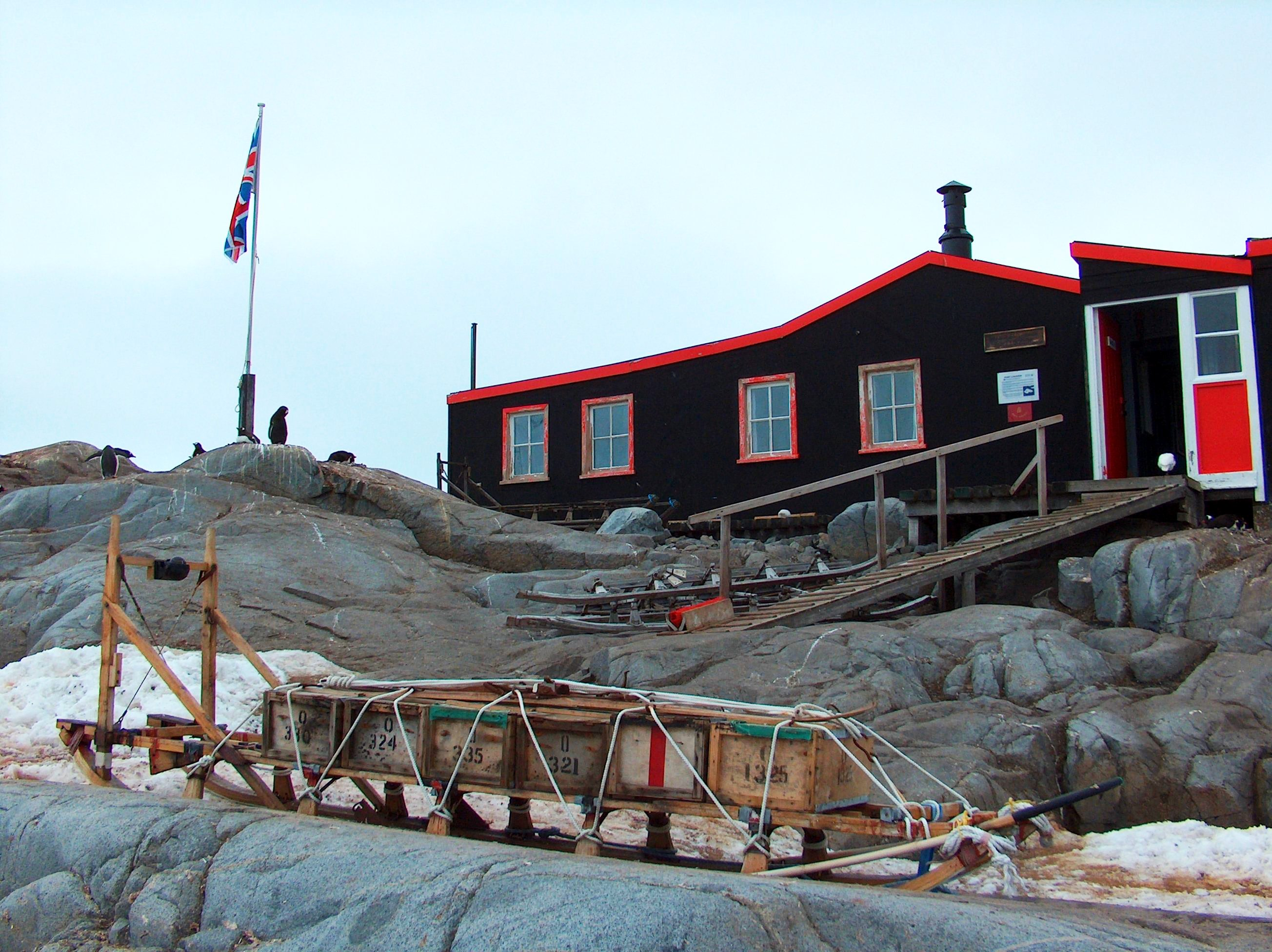
Port Lockroy Station A as it is today – now a museum

The end of World War II led to renewed interest in the Antarctic region. The United States refused to recognise any foreign territorial claims to Antarctica, initiating Operation Highjump. Argentina and Chile signed the Argentine-Chilean Agreement on Joint Defence of "Antarctic Rights", a defence agreement that envisioned potential military action over disputed Antarctic lands. Chile organized its First Chilean Antarctic Expedition in 1947–1948.

Among other accomplishments, it brought Chilean President Gabriel González Videla to inaugurate one of its bases personally, and he thereby became the first head of state to set foot on the continent.

Britain, on the other hand, continued the operation of the bases built during Operation Tabarin by transferring them to the newly established Falkland Islands Dependencies Survey. Operation Tabarin veterans Reece, White and Russell remained at their bases and continued their work for the FIDS. Participants of Operation Tabarin were awarded the Polar Medal in 1953.

Port Lockroy made the first measurements of the ionosphere and the first recording of an atmospheric whistler (electronic waves). It was also a key monitoring site during the International Geophysical Year of 1957. Port Lockroy was designated a Historic Site or Monument (HSM 61) and is now a museum following a proposal by the United Kingdom to the Antarctic Treaty Consultative Meeting.

== See also ==
- UK Antarctic Heritage Trust
- List of Antarctic expeditions
- New Swabia
- Territorial claims in Antarctica

== Sources ==
- Dudeney, J. R.; Walton, D. W. (2012). "From Scotia to Operation Tabarin – Developing British Policy for Antarctica". Polar Record. 48 (4): 342. Bibcode:2012PoRec..48..342D. doi:10.1017/S0032247411000520. S2CID 145613031.
- Fuchs, Sir Vivian E. (1982). Of Ice and Men. The Story of the British Antarctic Survey 1943-1973. Anthony Nelson.
- Haddelsey, S. (2014). Operation Tabarin: Britain's Secret Wartime Expedition to Antarctica, 1944–46. Stroud: History Press. ISBN 9780752493565.
- Pearce, Gerry (2018). Operation Tabarin 1943-45 and its Postal History. Independent Publishing Network. ISBN 978-1-78926-580-4. (Self-published but extensively references primary sources in national and specialist archives. Copies held by the UK legal deposit libraries, Trinity College Dublin Library and the libraries of the British Antarctic Survey and Scott Polar Research Institute (both in Cambridge, England))
- Robertson, S. C. (1993). Operation Tabarin. British Antarctic Survey. Information booklet produced for 50th anniversary.
- Taylor, Andrew (2017). Heidt, D.; Lackenbauer, P. W. (eds.). Two Years Below the Horn. Operation Tabarin, Field Science and Antarctic Sovereignty, 1944-1946. Canada: University of Manitoba Press. ISBN 978-0-88755-791-0.
- Walton, Kevin; Atkinson, Rick (1995). Of Dogs and Men: Fifty Years in the Antarctic. Illustrated Story of the Dogs of the British Antarctic Survey. Images (Booksellers & Distributors) Ltd. ISBN 1-897817-55-X.
- Wordie, J. M. (1946). "The Falkland Islands Dependencies Survey, 1943–6". Polar Record. 4 (32): 372–384. Bibcode:1946PoRec...4..372W. doi:10.1017/S0032247400042479. S2CID 129588807.
