= Vázquez Island =

Island in the Palmer Archipelago

- Location within Antarctica

Geography
- Location: Antarctica
- Coordinates: 64°55′S 63°25′W
- Archipelago: Palmer Archipelago

Administration
- Administered under the Antarctic Treaty System

Demographics
- Population: Uninhabited

Vázquez Island is an island lying between Fridtjof and Bob islands, off the southeast side of Wiencke Island in the Palmer Archipelago. It was first charted by the French Antarctic Expedition under J.B. Charcot, 1903–05. The name appears on an Argentine government chart of 1950.

== See also ==
- List of Antarctic and sub-Antarctic islands
