= Dayne =

== Given name ==
- M. Dayne Aldridge, former Dean of the School of Engineering at Mercer University
- Dayne Beams (born 1990), professional Australian rules football player
- Dayne Crist (born 1989), American football quarterback
- Dayne Kinnaird (born 1982), motocross rider for Zoo York Skateboard Company
- Dayne Pratzky, Australian anti-fracking activist
- Dayne Robertson (born 1988), Scottish football midfielder
- Dayne Sherman (born 1970), American writer of fiction and journalism
- Dayne Walling (born 1974), mayor of Flint, Michigan
- Dayne Wescott (1850–1929), member of the Wisconsin State Senate
- Dayne Weston (born 1986), Australian rugby league player
- Dayne Zorko (born 1989), professional Australian rules football player

== Surname ==
- Bella Dayne, German actress
- Blanche Dayne (1871–1944), American vaudeville actress
- Ron Dayne (born 1978), former American college and professional football player
- Taylor Dayne (born 1962), American pop and freestyle music singer-songwriter and actress

== See also ==
- Dayné Peak, a distinctive pyramidal peak northeast of Cape Errera, the southwest tip of Wiencke Island, in the Palmer Archipelago
- Dayne Ogilvie Prize, Canadian literary award
- Daynes
- Dane (disambiguation)
- Daye (disambiguation)
- Dwayne
- Dyne, a CGS unit of force
