= Jabet =

Jabet may refer to:

- Jabet Peak, Wiencke Island, in the Palmer Archipelago, Antarctica
- George Jabet, author of Nasology, parody nose classification
- Quentin Jabet (born 2002), French equestrian vaulter
- Jabet, Peudada, village in Peudada District, Bireuën Regency, Indonesia
