= Doumer =

Doumer may refer to:

== People ==
- Paul Doumer (1857–1932), French president
- René Doumer (1887–1917), French flying ace

== Places ==
- Doumer Hill, Palmer Archipelago, Antarctica
- Doumer Island, Palmer Archipelago, Antarctica
