= Janssen Peak =

Mountain in Antarctica

Janssen Peak (64°53′S 63°31′W) is a conspicuous peak, 1,085 metres (3,560 ft) high, forming the southwestern end of the Sierra DuFief in the southwestern part of Wiencke Island, in the Palmer Archipelago, Antarctica. It was discovered by the Belgian Antarctic Expedition, 1897–99, under Gerlache, and charted by the French Antarctic Expedition, 1903–05, under Jean-Baptiste Charcot, who named it for Jules Janssen, a noted French astronomer.
