= Breakwater Island =

Island in the Palmer Archipelago, Antarctica

Breakwater Island (64°47′S 63°13′W) is a small island in the Palmer Archipelago with a line of rocks extending in a southwest arc from it, lying opposite Nipple Peak, 0.3 nautical miles (0.6 km) off the east side of Wiencke Island. The descriptive name, suggestive of an artificial breakwater, was given by the Falkland Islands Dependencies Survey in 1944.

== See also ==
- List of Antarctic and sub-Antarctic islands
