= Stokes Hill =

Stokes Hill (64°52′S 63°32′W) is a small but prominent rocky peak, 270 m, lying 1 nautical mile (1.9 km) southeast of Doumer Hill on Doumer Island, in the Palmer Archipelago. First charted by the French Antarctic Expedition under Charcot, 1903–05. Surveyed by the British Naval Hydrographic Survey Unit in 1956–57. So named by the United Kingdom Antarctic Place-Names Committee (UK-APC) because the hill was first climbed by the engineer of the Unit's motor-launch; stokes is naval slang for a seaman who works in the engine room.
