= Luigi di Savoia =

Luigi di Savoia may refer to:

- Prince Luigi Amedeo, Duke of the Abruzzi
- Italian cruiser Luigi di Savoia Duca degli Abruzzi
- Luigi di Savoia, Libya, the Italian name of the Libyan town Al Abraq, Libya, named after the duke
- Savoia Peak or Luigi de Savoia Peak, named after the duke
- Mount Luigi di Savoia ninth highest peak in Africa
