= Peltier Channel =

Channel in Antarctica

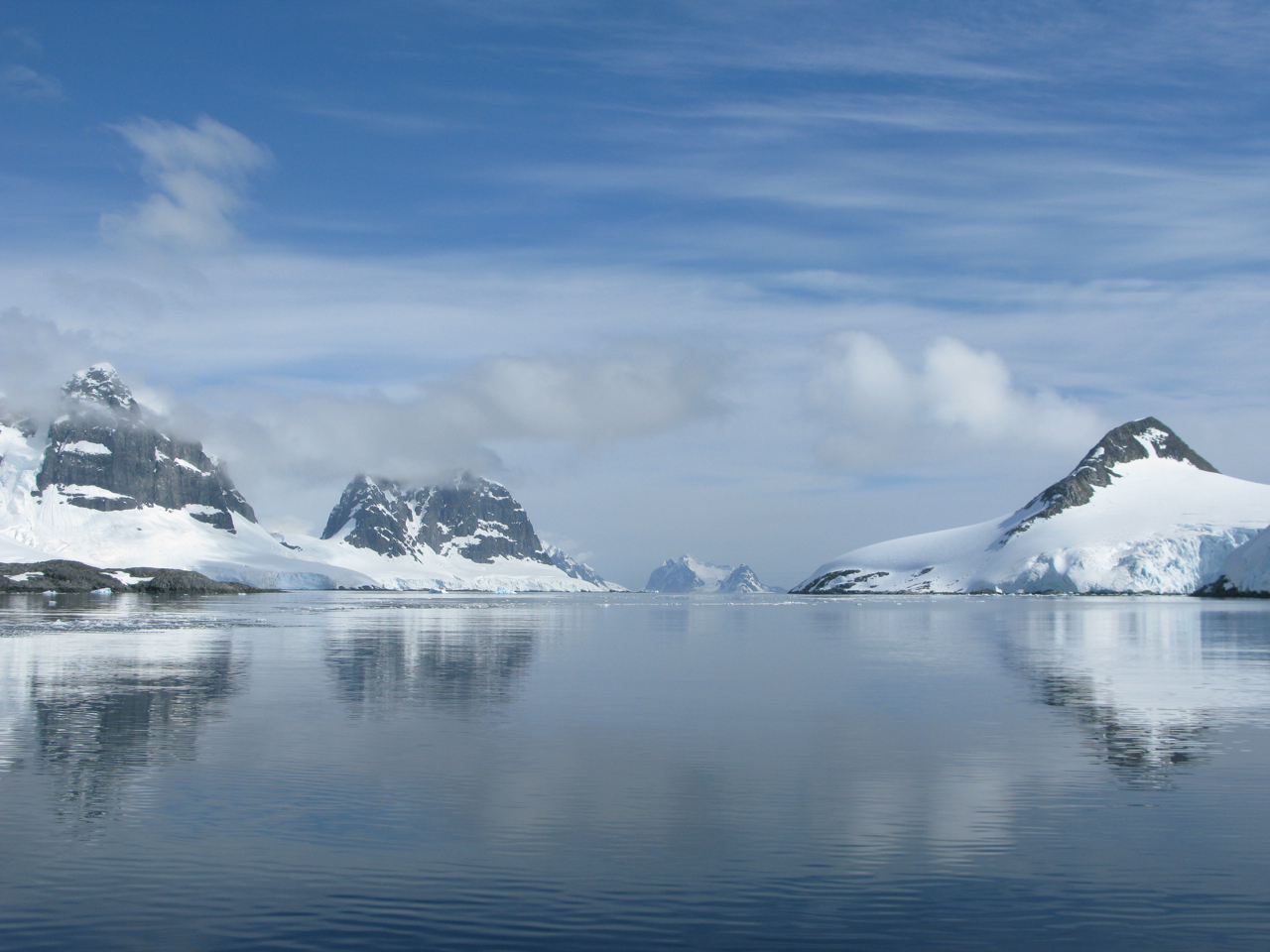
Peltier Channel, seen towards the south exit.

Peltier Channel (64°52′S 63°32′W) is a channel 6 nautical miles (11 km) long, in a NE-SW direction, separating Doumer and Wiencke Island Islands to the south of Port Lockroy, in the Palmer Archipelago to the west of the Antarctic Peninsula. Discovered by the French Antarctic Expedition, 1903–05, and named by Charcot for Jean Peltier, noted French physicist.

It was surveyed for the first time in March 2019 by HMS Protector.

== See also ==
- Gerlache Strait Geology
- Bauprés Rocks
