= Security Bay =

Security Bay (64°51′S 63°37′W) is a bay lying between Homeward and Gauthier Point on the north side of Doumer Island, in the Palmer Archipelago. First charted by the French Antarctic Expedition under Charcot, 1903–05. So named by the United Kingdom Antarctic Place-Names Committee (UK-APC) in 1958 because the bay gives adequate shelter to small craft against both the southwest gales which create a heavy sea in the southern entrance to Neumayer Channel and the strong northeasterly winds which funnel down the channel; it was used for this purpose several times by the British Naval Hydrographic Survey Unit in 1956–57.

== See also ==
- Homeward Point
