= Nemo Peak (Antarctica) =

Mountain in Antarctica

Nemo Peak (64°46′S 63°16′W) is a conspicuous peak, 865 m, standing 1 nautical mile (1.9 km) northeast of Nipple Peak in the north part of Wiencke Island, in the Palmer Archipelago. Discovered by the Belgian Antarctic Expedition, 1897–99, under Adrien de Gerlache. The name appears on a chart based on a 1927 survey by DI personnel in the RRS Discovery, but may reflect an earlier naming.
