= Lockley Point =

Headland in Antarctica

Lockley Point (64°47′S 63°23′W) is a low, ice-covered point lying 1 nautical mile (2 km) northeast of Noble Peak on the northwest side of Wiencke Island, in the Palmer Archipelago, Antarctica. It was discovered by the Belgian Antarctic Expedition under Gerlache in 1898. The point was resighted and charted by the Falkland Islands Dependencies Survey in 1944, and named for Lieutenant J.G. Lockley, Royal Naval Volunteer Reserve, base leader, biologist, and meteorologist at Port Lockroy in 1945.
