= Yelcho Base =

Yelcho Station
- Antarctic Station
- Location of Yelcho Station in Antarctica
- Coordinates: 64°52′33″S 63°35′01″W
- Country: Chile
- Location in Antarctica: South Bay; Doumer Island; Antarctica
- Administered by: Instituto Antártico Chileno (INACH)
- Established: 18 February 1962
- Named for: Yelcho (1906)
- Elevation: 10 m (33 ft)

Population (2017)
  - Summer: 28
  - Winter: 0
- Type: Seasonal
- Period: Summer
- Status: Operational
- Activities: List: Marine biology; Oceanography
- Website: Base Yelcho (INACH)

Yelcho Base is a Chilean Antarctic research base. It is located on the shore of the South Bay, Doumer Island.

The station was built in 1962 by the Chilean Army and was given to the INACH in 1980. It was abandoned between 1998 and 2014, and was reopened in 2015.

After its last remodeling it went from being a small "sub-base", a scientific shelter of 50 m^{2} built, to have a built area of 200 square metres (2,200 sq ft), with its own laboratories and an increase in accommodation capacity, from its original 7 beds, until completing space for up to 28 people.

== Toponymy ==
It is named for the Yelcho that was commanded by Luis Pardo, who saved the Shacketon's Expedition in 1916 from the Elephant Island.

== History ==
The construction of the base was initiated by the Chilean Navy during the 16th Antarctic campaign of Chile, and was completed in the following season, on 18 February 1962.

== See also ==
- List of Antarctic research stations
- List of Antarctic field camps
