= Hektor Station =

Abandoned whaling station in Antarctica

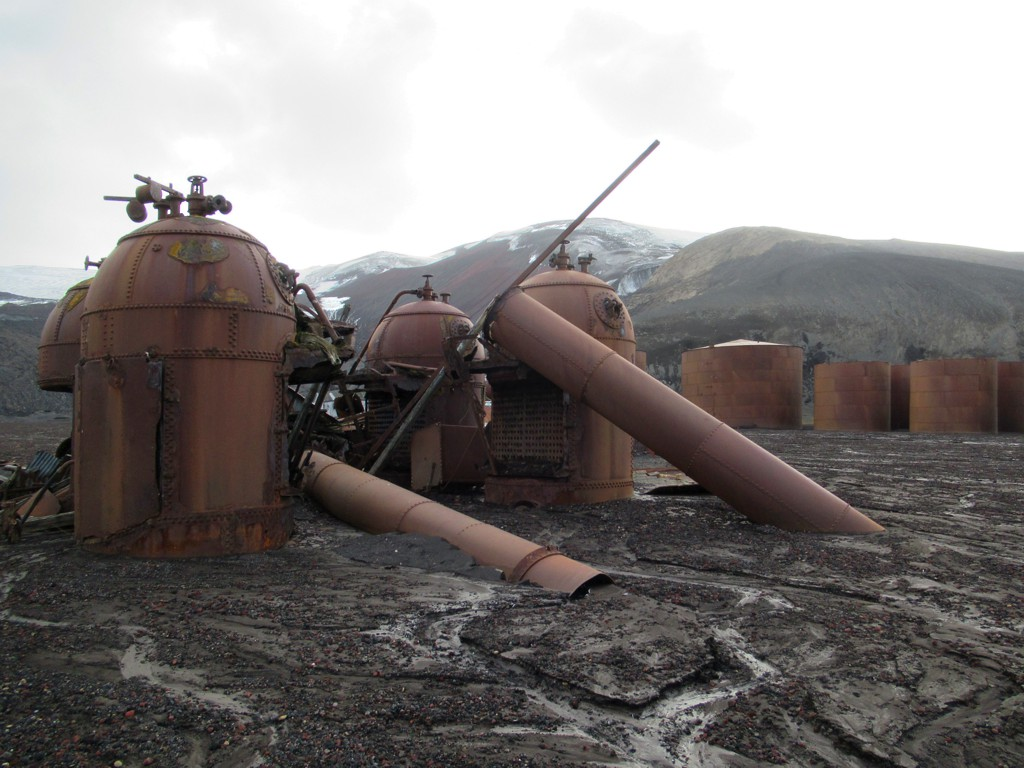
The ruins of Hektor Station's tank farm in 2022.

Hektor Station is the name of a now-abandoned whaling station located on the shore of Deception Island, Antarctica.

== History ==
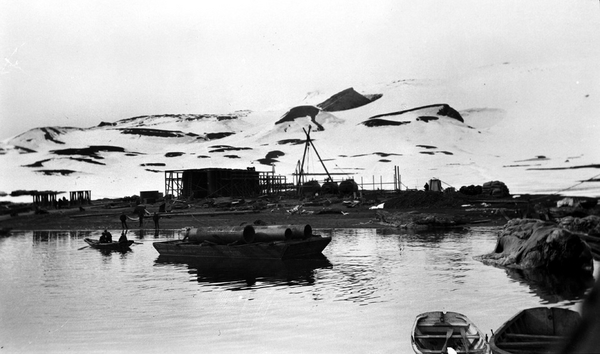
Hektor Station under construction (1912).

In 1911, the government of the Falkland Islands Dependencies granted the Hektor Whaling Company (based in Tønsberg, Norway) a license to establish a whaling station on the coast of Deception Island. The purpose of the factory, which was built in 1912 on 500 acres of land, was to more efficiently extract oil from whale corpses. While whale fat was processed aboard factory boats, the whale's bodies were boiled at the station on land and the oil was stored in large iron tanks.

The station was most active each year from November through March, and regularly employed around 150 people. As J. Stephen Dibbern has noted, "The land factory was a complete operation needing very little in outside support other than resupply of fuels." Indeed, the site was equipped with barracks, a mess hall and kitchen, a magazine, a hospital, various production shops, storehouses, a guano mill, and a tank farm. The station even had its own cemetery, where 35 men were buried, making it the largest in Antarctica. (This cemetery was later buried by volcanic mudflow in 1970.)

Hektor Station was highly profitable before World War I, but during the war, the station was temporarily closed. During the 1920s, the company was facing financial challenges, and by April 1931, the price of whale oil had reached a low, necessitating that Hektor Station be closed for good. In 1944, as part of Operation Tabarin, the British military established a base (Base B) in the remains of Hektor Station. This base, which conducted meteorological and geographical research, was staffed until 1969, when it was destroyed by a volcanic eruption. Today, the site is in a state of disrepair. However, the station's tank farm, though "tilted and rusted", is still a prominent feature.

== Gallery ==
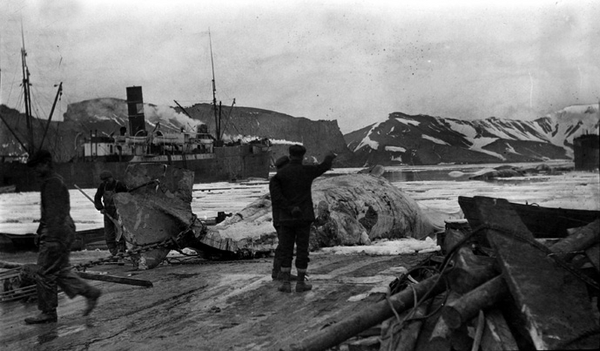
Hektor Station in 1912. The factory ship Hektoria (I) is in the background.

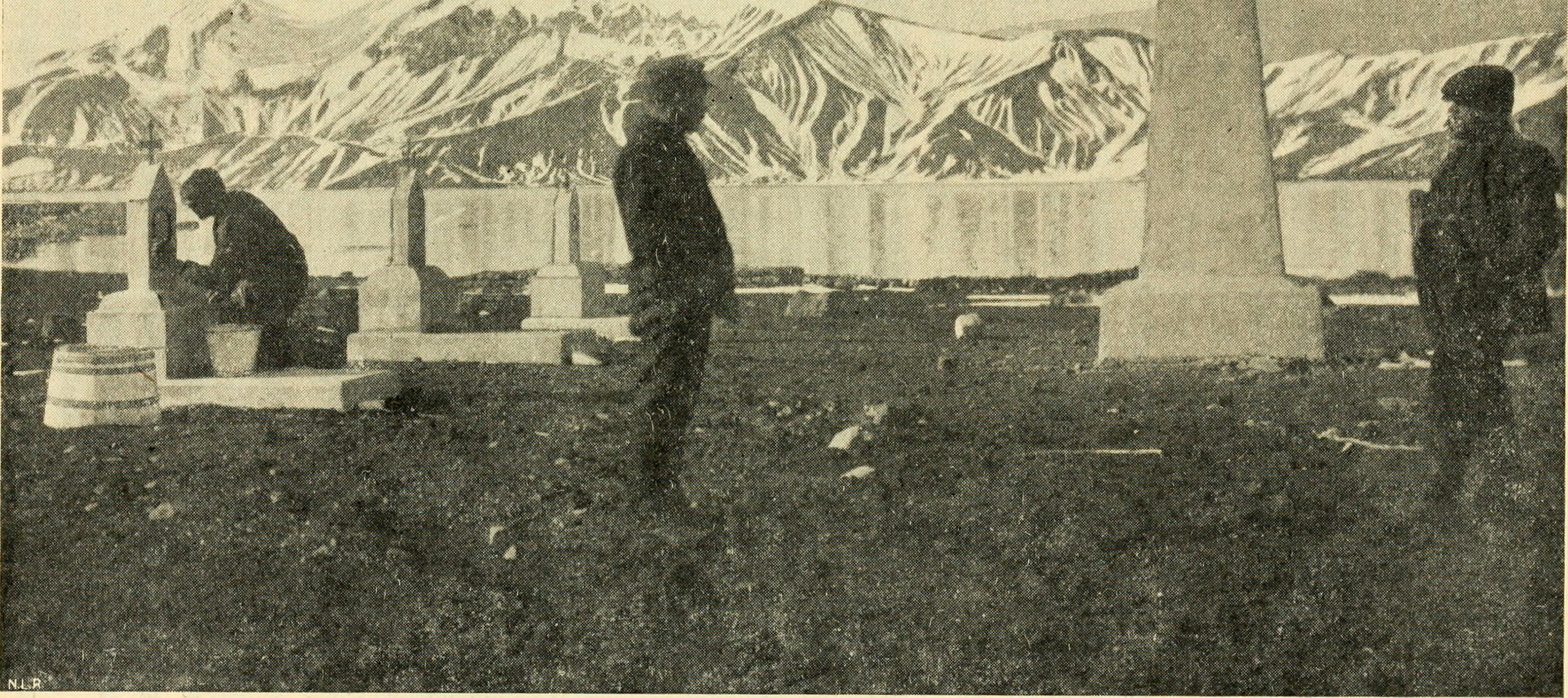
The Hektor Station cemetery in 1922.

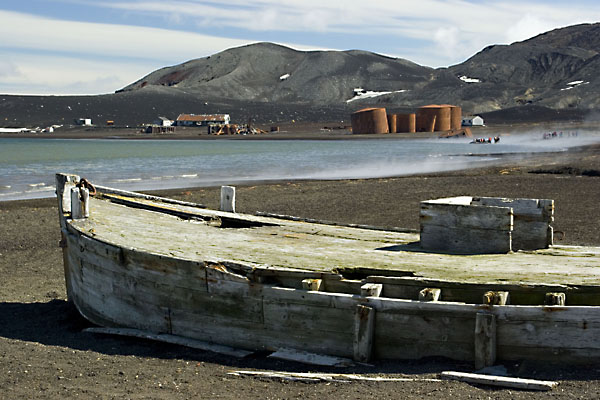
An abandoned boat, with the ruins of Hektor Station in the background (2006).

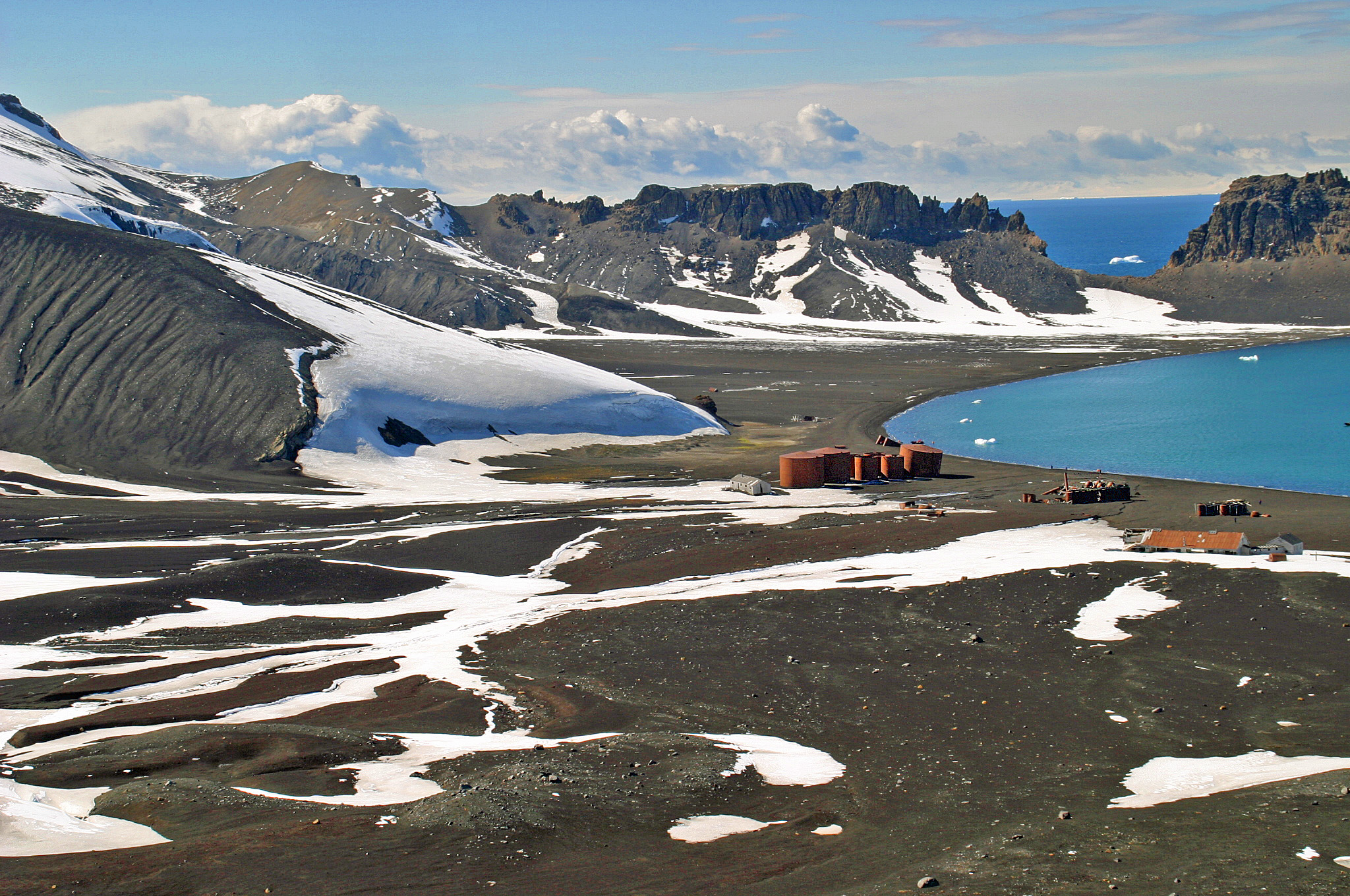
The ruins of Hektor Station (2005).

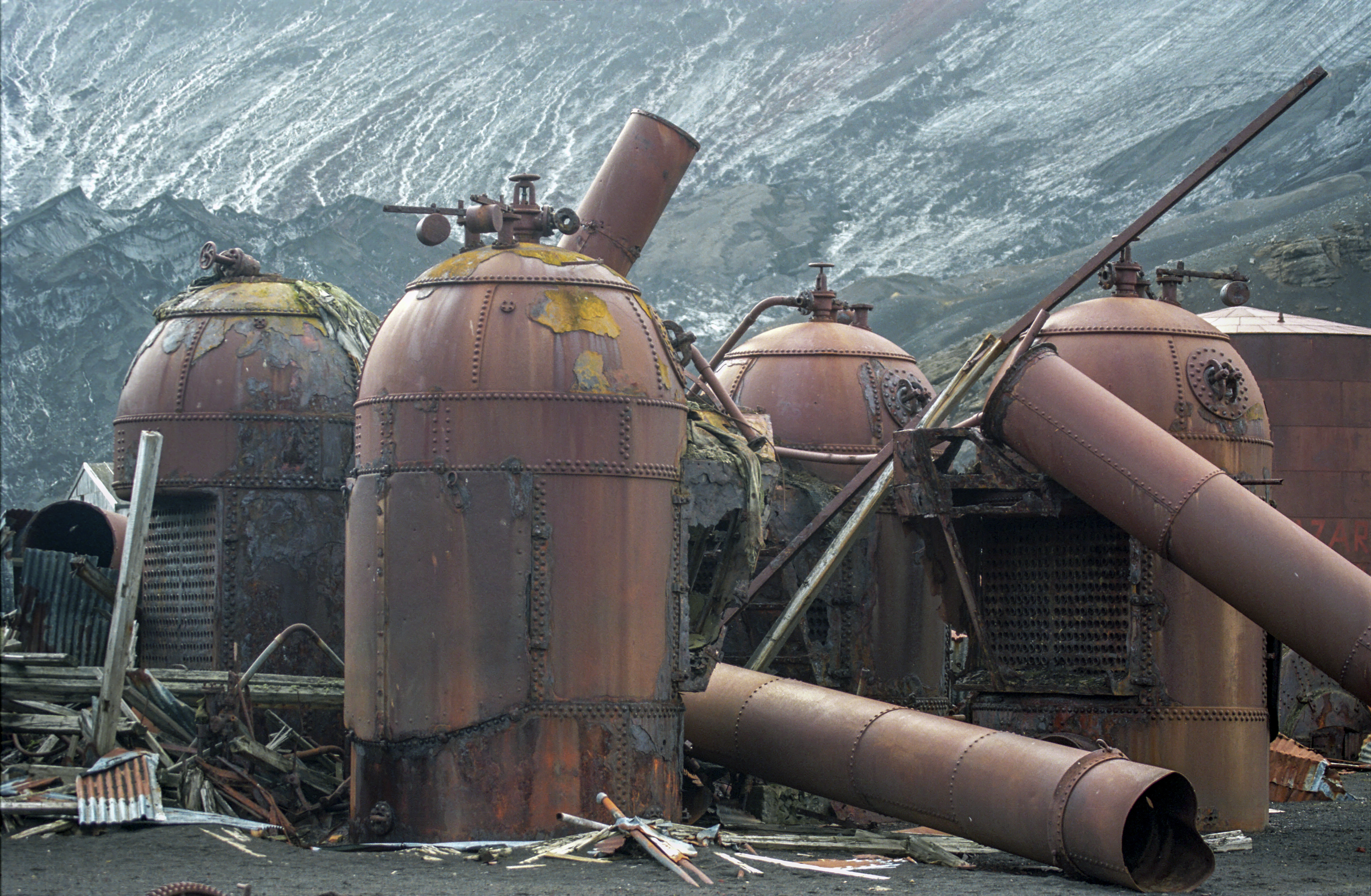
Hektor Station's rusted tank farm (2000).

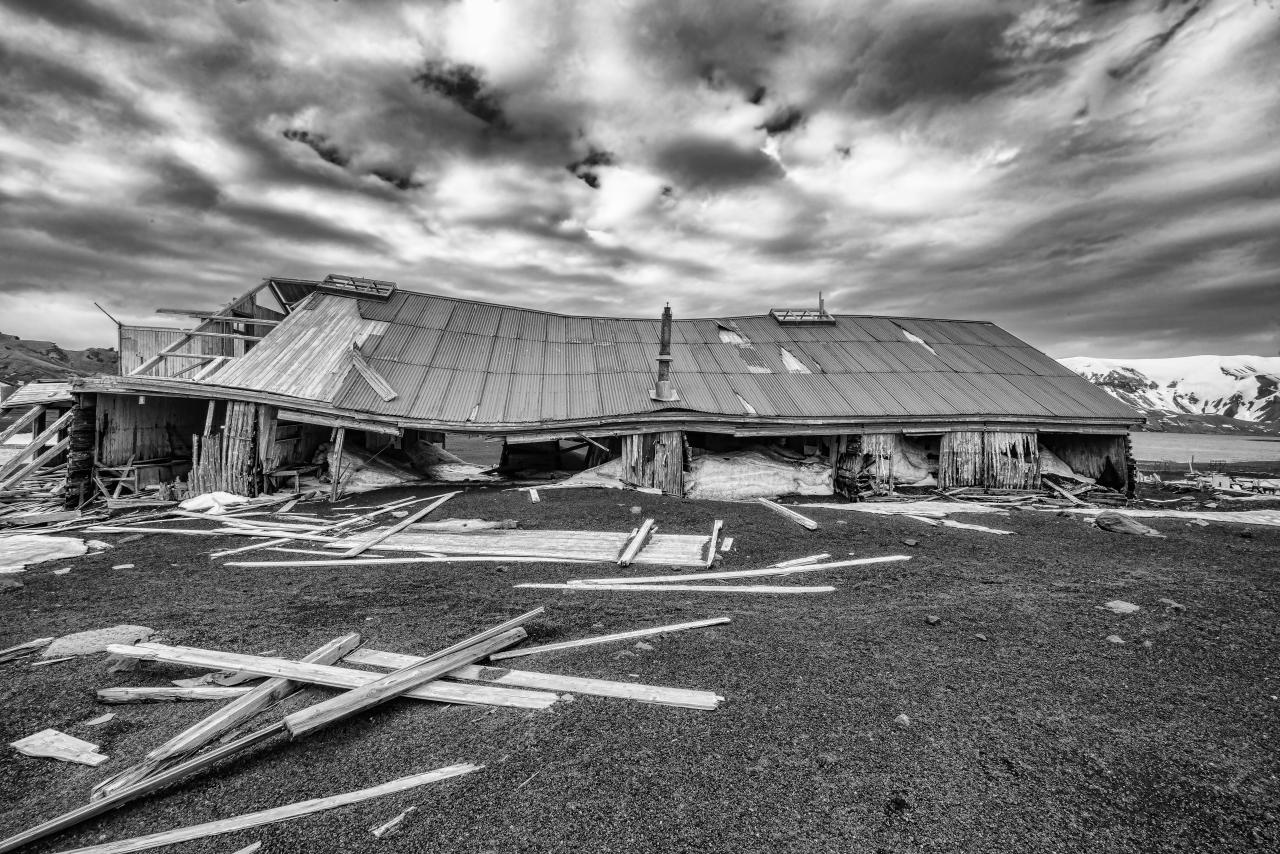
Ruins of one of the buildings at Hektor Station (2013).

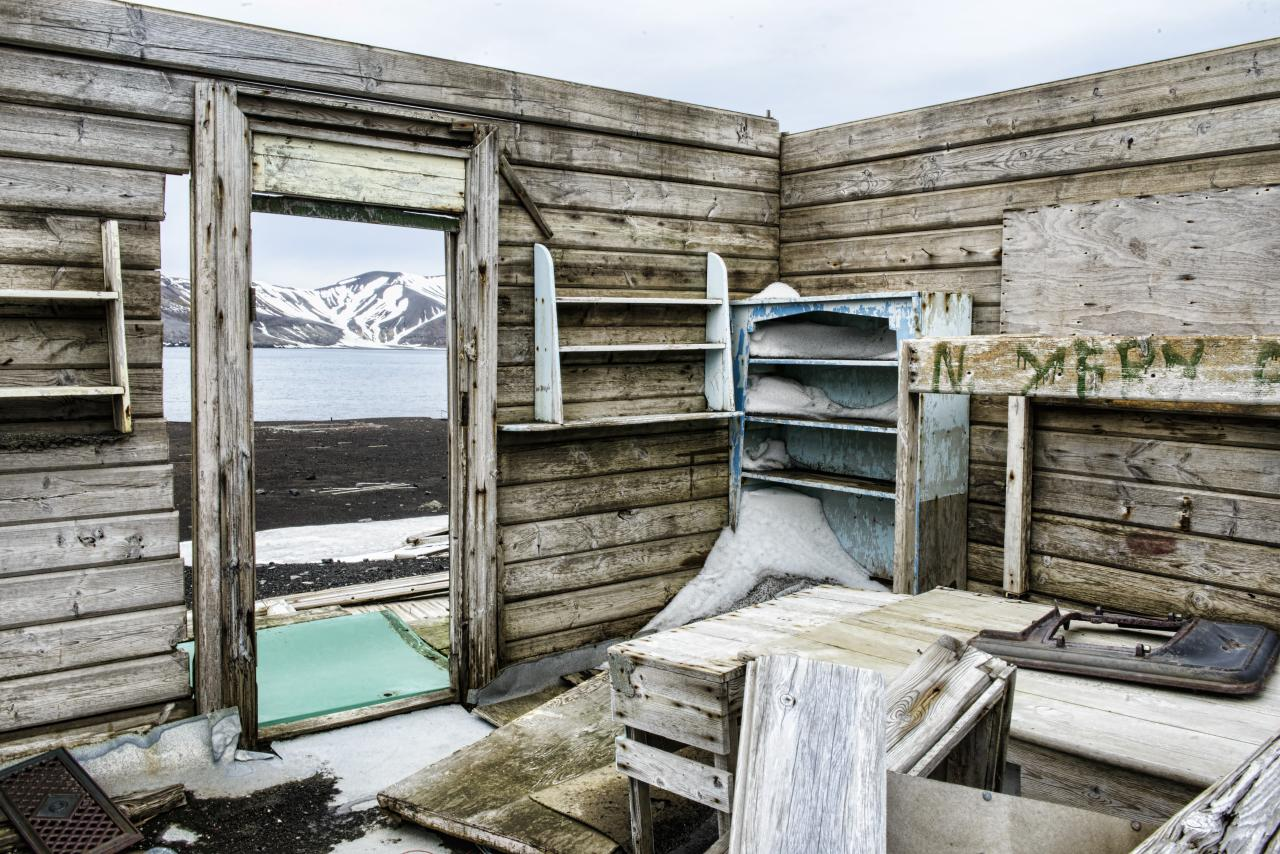
The interior of one of the buildings at Hektor Station (2013).
