= Dayné Peak =

Dayné Peak (64°54′S 63°36′W) is a distinctive pyramidal peak, 730 metres (2,400 ft) high, immediately northeast of Cape Errera, the southwest tip of Wiencke Island, in the Palmer Archipelago. It was discovered by the Belgian Antarctic Expedition, 1897–99, under Gerlache, and was named by the French Antarctic Expedition, 1903–05, under Jean-Baptiste Charcot, for Pierre Dayné, a mountain guide and a member of the expedition.
