= Comer Range =

Mountain range in Wiencke Island

The Comer Range (64°48′00″S 63°26′00″W) is an Antarctican mountain range, 3 nautical miles (5.6 km) long, running southwest to northeast and rising to 600 meters to the west of Harbour Glacier in Wiencke Island, Palmer Archipelago. From south to north the range includes Jabet Peak and Noble Peak. Named by the Advisory Committee on Antarctic Names in 2007 after Gary Comer (1927–2006), an American philanthropist and founder of the Lands' End company whose association with polar research stems from his 2001 trip through the Northwest Passage in the vessel Turmoil. The ease of his passage in comparison to that of numerous experienced sailors previously convinced him that climate change was occurring. To research the issue Comer contacted distinguished scientists Wallace S. Broecker, Lamont-Doherty Geological Observatory, and F. Sherwood Rowland, University of California, Irvine, and engaged their help in sponsoring a fellowship/mentorship program that he would fund. Comer's investments in climate and environmental change research in the Arctic, and in particular the polar science internship program that he developed and supported, represents a substantial contribution to the advancement of polar science. The new intellectual capital represented by the cadre of new scientists trained through his internship program has already made substantial contributions to knowledge of the Arctic and this in turn represents a significant contribution to improving the global glacial-geologic and glaciological context that is essential for understanding climate change work in the Antarctic.
