= Cape Kemp =

Cape Kemp (64°52′S 63°39′W) is a cape forming the southwest tip of Doumer Island, in the Palmer Archipelago, Antarctica. It was first charted by the French Antarctic Expedition, 1903–05, under Jean-Baptiste Charcot. Various islands of the Palmer Archipelago were charted in 1927 by Discovery Investigations personnel on the Discovery, and this cape was subsequently named for Dr. Stanley W. Kemp, a British marine biologist and oceanographer, who was scientific leader on the Discovery.
