= Sierra DuFief =

Mountain range in Antarctica

The Sierra DuFief (64°52′S 63°28′W) is a mountain range 4 nautical miles (7 km) long with numerous sharp peaks, the highest at 1,415 metres (4,640 ft), extending in a northeast–southwest direction in the south part of Wiencke Island, in the Palmer Archipelago. It was discovered by the Belgian Antarctic Expedition, 1897–99, and named by Gerlache for Jean DuFief, then general secretary of the Belgian Royal Geographical Society.

== See also ==
- Janssen Peak
