= Bob Island =

Antarctic island

- Location within Antarctica

Geography
- Location: Antarctica
- Coordinates: 64°56′15″S 63°26′0″W
- Archipelago: Palmer Archipelago

Administration
- Administered under the Antarctic Treaty System

Demographics
- Population: Uninhabited

Bob Island is a rocky island 1 nautical mile (2 km) long and 145 metres (480 ft) high, lying 4 nautical miles (7 km) southeast of Cape Errera, on Wiencke Island in the Palmer Archipelago off the coast of Antarctica. An island in this vicinity was surveyed and photographed by the Belgian Antarctic Expedition (BelgAE) under Gerlache in the year 1898. It was originally called "Ile Famine", but in the reports resulting from the expedition it was renamed "Ile Bob". In a survey of the area in 1955, the Falkland Islands Dependencies Survey (FIDS) made a landing on this island. Although it differs somewhat in size and position from the BelgAE reports, the FIDS found it closely resembles the BelgAE photograph and consider it to be the island originally named.

== See also ==
- List of Antarctic and sub-Antarctic islands
