= Pursuit Point =

Peninsula in Antarctica

Coordinates: 64°55′S 63°27′W

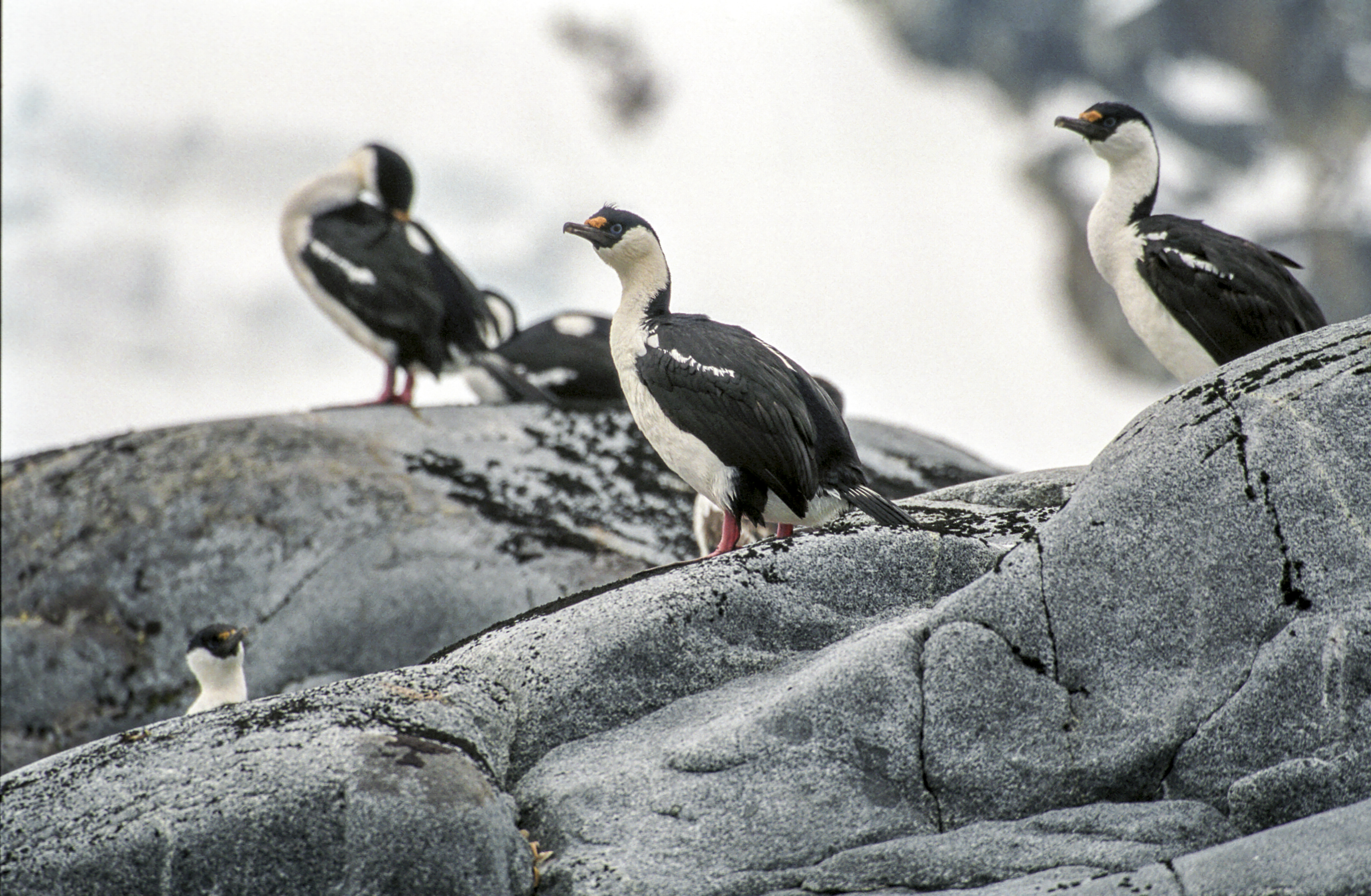
The IBA is an important breeding site for imperial shags

Pursuit Point is a mostly ice-covered peninsula on south-eastern Wiencke Island, one of the larger islands of the Palmer Archipelago of Antarctica.

== Important Bird Area ==
The peninsula has been identified as an Important Bird Area (IBA) by BirdLife International because it supports breeding colonies of about 200 pairs of chinstrap penguins and 140 pairs of imperial shags.
