= Fridtjof Island =

Island in the Palmer Archipelago

- Location within Antarctica

Geography
- Location: Antarctica
- Coordinates: 64°53′S 63°22′W
- Archipelago: Palmer Archipelago

Administration
- Administered under the Antarctic Treaty System

Demographics
- Population: Uninhabited

Fridtjof Island is an island lying 2.4 km (1.5 mi) northeast of Vázquez Island, off the southeast side of Wiencke Island in the Palmer Archipelago. It was discovered and named by the Belgian Antarctic Expedition under Gerlache, 1897–99. It is among several islands charted and named by this expedition in 1898, before their ship crossed the Antarctic Circle on 15 February.

== See also ==
- List of Antarctic and sub-Antarctic islands
