= Homeward Point =

Homeward Point (64°51′S 63°37′W) is a point forming the west side of the entrance to Security Bay, on Doumer Island in the Palmer Archipelago, Antarctica. It was first charted by the French Antarctic Expedition, 1903–05, under Jean-Baptiste Charcot, and so named by the British Naval Hydrographic Survey Unit in 1956–57 because the point was sighted as a prominent landmark almost daily by the crew of their motor-launch when homeward bound for Port Lockroy at the end of a day's survey work in the Bismarck Strait.
