= Lefèvre-Utile Point =

Lefèvre-Utile Point (Antarctica)

Lefèvre-Utile Point (64°50′S 63°31′W) is a point 1 nautical mile (2 km) west of Curie Point along the north side of Doumer Island, in the Palmer Archipelago, Antarctica. It was discovered and named by the French Antarctic Expedition, 1903–05, under Jean-Baptiste Charcot.
