= South Bay (Doumer Island) =

Cove on Doumer Island in the Palmer Archipelago, Antarctica

Coordinates: 64°52′11″S 63°34′45″W

South Bay is a 1.7 km wide bay indenting for 2.8 km between Cape Kemp and Py Point on the south-west coast of Doumer Island in the Palmer Archipelago of Antarctica. It was charted by the British Graham Land Expedition in February 1935 and so named from its position on the island. The summer only Yelcho research station, administered by the Chilean Antarctic Institute, stands on the shore of the bay. The eastern part of the bay is designated as Antarctic Specially Protected Area (ASPA No.146) (Site of Special Scientific Interest No.28) to shield it from accidental interference because it is the subject of a long-term marine ecology research program.
