= Bauprés Rocks =

Bauprés Rocks (64°54′S 63°37′W) are two rocks lying in the middle of the southern entrance to Peltier Channel, in the Palmer Archipelago. First charted by the French Antarctic Expedition under Jean-Baptiste Charcot, 1903–05, the descriptive name Rocas Bauprés (bowsprit rocks) was used on Argentine government charts as early as 1952; when viewed from a distance the feature is reported to resemble the bowsprit of a ship.
