= Noble Peak =

Mountain in Antarctica

Noble Peak (64°48′S 63°25′W) is a peak in the Comer Range, 720 m, standing 1 nautical mile (1.9 km) southwest of Lockley Point and marking the northeast end of a prominent ridge on the northwest side of Wiencke Island, in the Palmer Archipelago. Discovered by the Belgian Antarctic Expedition, 1897–99, under Gerlache. The name appears on a chart based on a 1927 survey by DI personnel on the Discovery, but may reflect on earlier naming.
