= Daynes =

Daynes is a surname. Notable people with the surname include:

- Colin Daynes (born 1974), Canadian sport wrestler
- Élisabeth Daynès (born 1960), French sculptor
- Joseph J. Daynes (1851–1920), English organist
- Kathryn M. Daynes (born 1946), American historian

== See also ==
- Dayne
