= Aquiline nose =

Human nose with a prominent bridge

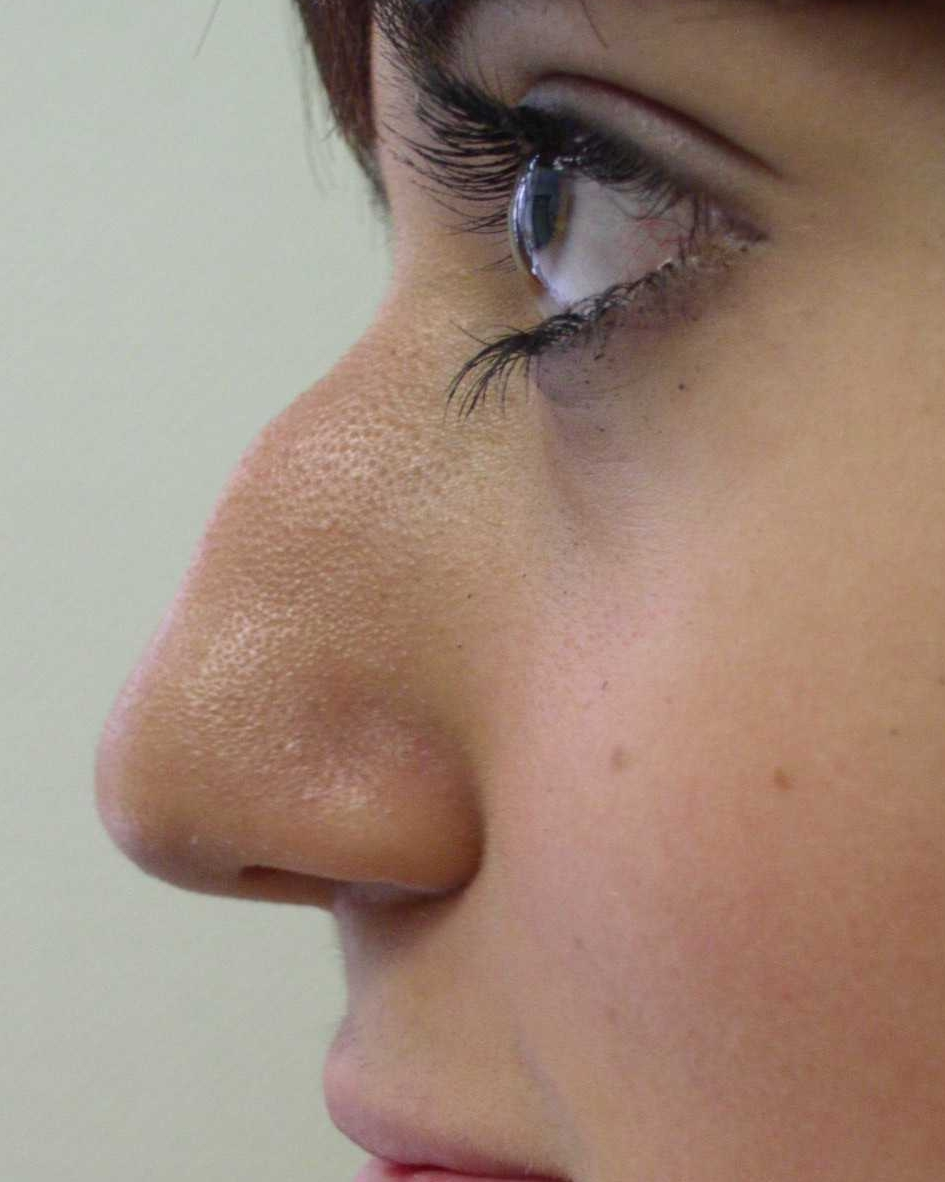
A woman with an aquiline nose

An aquiline nose (also called a Roman nose) is a human nose with a prominent bridge, giving it the appearance of being curved or slightly bent. While some have ascribed the aquiline nose to specific ethnic, racial, or geographic groups, and in some cases associated it with other supposed non-physical characteristics (i.e. intelligence, status, personality, etc.—see below), no scientific studies or evidence support any such linkage. As with many phenotypical expressions (e.g. 'widow's peak', eye color, earwax type) it is found in many geographically diverse populations.

== Etymology ==
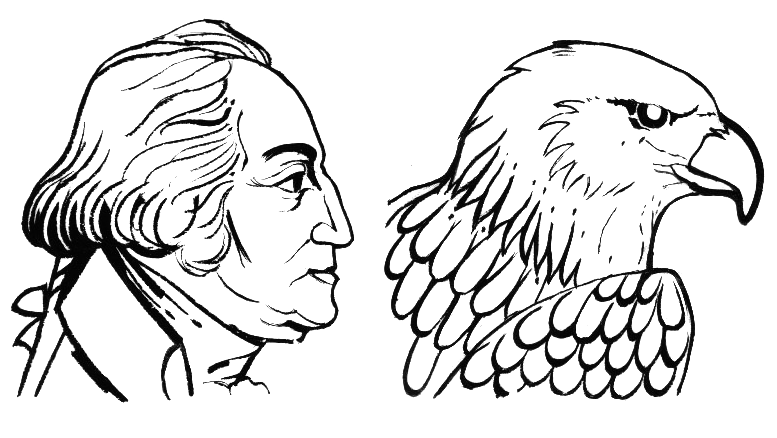
A comparison of an aquiline nose and an eagle's beak

The word aquiline comes from the Latin word aquilinus ("eagle-like"), an allusion to the curved beak of an eagle.

== In art ==
=== Portraiture ===
In ancient Roman imperial portraiture, a prominent hooked nose was a recurring element in depictions of the Julio-Claudian dynasty and the emperors of the first century AD, before emerging again in the third and early fourth centuries as a defining feature in portraits of Constantius Chlorus and his son, Constantine the Great; prominent noses could represent the vigour and authority of the emperor and his regime.

=== Literature ===
From parody nose classification Notes on Noses: "It indicates great decision, considerable Energy, Firmness, Absence of Refinement, and disregard for the bienseances of life".

In some fictional works, especially that of post-Enlightenment Western writers, a Roman nose has been characterized as a marker of beauty and nobility. A well-known example of the aquiline nose as a marker contrasting the bearer with their contemporaries is the protagonist of Aphra Behn's Oroonoko (1688). Although an African prince, he speaks French, has straightened hair, thin lips, and a "nose that was rising and Roman instead of African and flat". These features set him apart from most of his peers, and marked him instead as noble and on par with Europeans.

== Racism ==
In the context of scientific racism, writers have attributed aquiline noses as a characteristic of different "races"; e.g. Jan Czekanowski claimed that it was characteristic of the Arabid race, Armenoid race, Mediterranean race, and Dinarid race. In 1899, William Z. Ripley claimed that it was characteristic of peoples of Teutonic descent. The supposed science of physiognomy, popular during the Victorian era, made the "prominent" nose a marker of Aryanness: "the shape of the nose and the cheeks indicated, like the forehead's angle, the subject's social status and level of intelligence. A Roman nose was superior to a snub nose in its suggestion of firmness and power, and heavy jaws revealed a latent sensuality and coarseness".

Among South Asian ethnic groups, the aquiline nose type is most common among the peoples of Afghanistan, Dardistan, the Pamirs, also frequent in Kashmir as well as among the Hindus of various castes in rest of India, as well as a prominent feature in the Greco-Buddhist statuary of Gandhara (a region spanning the upper Indus and Kabul River valleys throughout northern Pakistan and north-east Afghanistan). The ethnographer George Campbell, in his Ethnology of India, stated:

The high nose, slightly aquiline, is a common type [among Kashmiri Pandit]. Raise a little the brow of a Greek statue and give the nose a small turn at the bony point in front of the bridge, so as to break the straightness of the line, you have the model type of this part of India, to be found both in living men and in the statues of the Peshawar Valley.

== Notable examples ==
=== Cleopatra ===
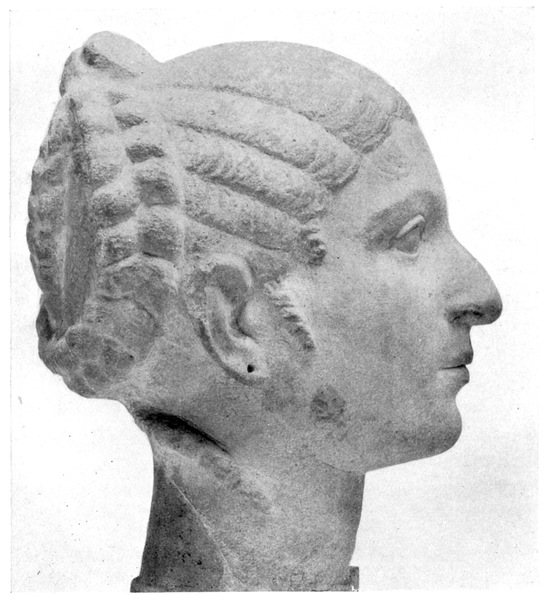
An ancient Roman portrait head, c. 50–30 BC, now located in the British Museum, which may depict Cleopatra, or a woman who closely modelled herself on her

In ancient portraiture, Cleopatra is typically depicted with a prominent aquiline nose. The French polymath Blaise Pascal believed that the queen's nose played a role in the way she had seduced both Julius Caesar and Marc Antony, writing in his Pensées that "if it had been shorter, the whole face of the Earth would have changed".

== See also ==
- Rhinoplasty § Nasal analysis
- Jewish nose – Ethnic stereotype
- Nasone
