= Tombstone Hill (Palmer Archipelago) =

Coordinates: 64°49′S 63°31′W

Tombstone Hill is a hill which rises to 50 m close east-northeast of Damoy Point, Wiencke Island, in the Palmer Archipelago. It was discovered and first mapped by the French Antarctic Expedition, 1903–05, under Charcot. The name given by the Falkland Islands Dependencies Survey (FIDS) in 1944 is descriptive of some rocks on the top of the hill.
