= Nasology =

1848 book by George Jabet

Nasology: Or, Hints towards a Classification of Noses
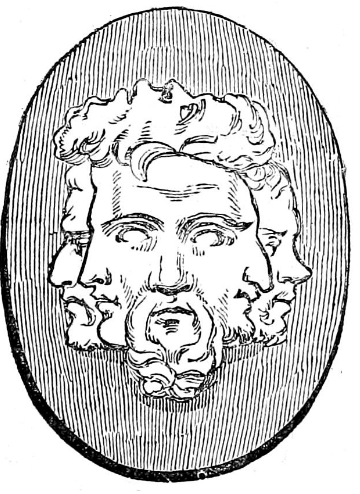
- An illustration on the title page of the book
- Author: Eden Warwick [pseudonym; George Jabet]
- Language: English
- Publisher: Richard Bentley
- Publication date: 1848
- Publication place: London, England, United Kingdom
- Media type: Hardcover
- Pages: 263
- OCLC: 479075

Nasology: Or, Hints towards a Classification of Noses (reissued as Notes on Noses) was a 1848 book published in London under the authorship of Eden Warwick, pen name of a George Jabet, an elaborate parody on phrenology, 282 pages thick. There were several editions of the book in the mid-19th century, and it was taken seriously, in press and among doctors.

== The author ==
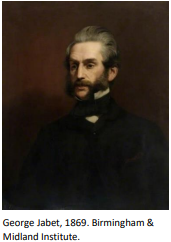
George Jabet, by William Thomas Roden

George Jabet (1815–1873) was a solicitor and he was actively involved in the public life of Birmingham, being associated with many literary and educational societies of the city. In addition to Nasology, he published several other books under the pen name Eden Warwick, the first one being The Poets' Pleasaunce, or, Garden of All Sorts of Pleasant Flowers (1847), as its Preface says, "to illustrate the extent of homage which our best Poets, prior to the present century, have paid to Nature, in Flowers" and "it is intended to exhibit a History of the Poetry in Flowers".

== The book ==
Nasology originated as a paper communicated to a small literary society as Handsworth, later expanded into a book. However the title proved to be unattractive, and the publisher reissued the book under the title Notes on Noses in 1859.

The book has a pronounced anti-scientific stance, which probably did not reflect actual Jabet's views on science. For example, the book jokingly criticizes the contemporary science, saying that it works for monetary gain, rather than for the advancement of knowledge, especially picking on geology: instead of "raising and elevating the mind" it facilitates "the discovery of minerals, or the boring of artesian wells".

=== Nasal classification ===
Warwick states that "besides being an ornament to the face, or a convenient handle by which to grasp an impudent fellow, it is an important index to its owner's character; and that the accurate observation and minute comparison of an extensive collection of Noses of persons whose mental characteristics are known, justifies a Nasal Classification." Then the book proceeds with the latter, recognizing six main classes, with detailed analysis, at the same time noting that "there are infinite crosses and intermixtures".

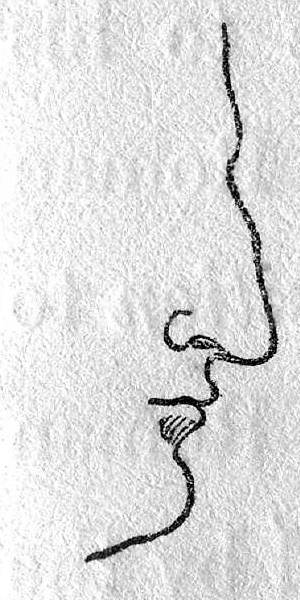
Class I. (Roman or Aquiline Nose)

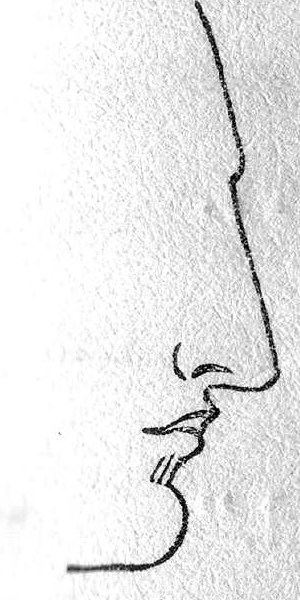
Class II. (Greek or Straight Nose)

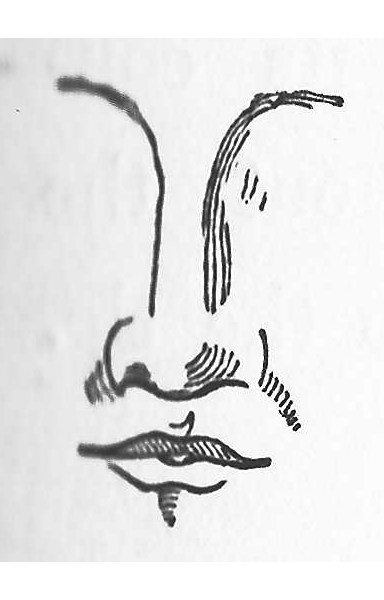
Class III. (Cogitative or Wide-Nostrilled Nose)

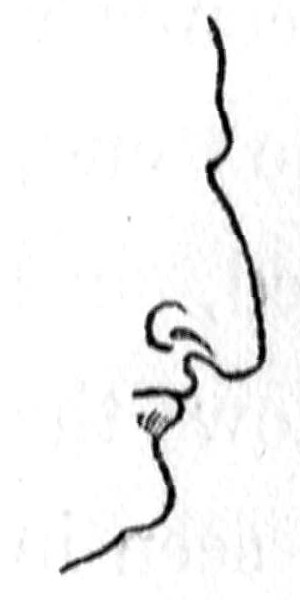
Class IV. (Jewish or Hawk Nose)

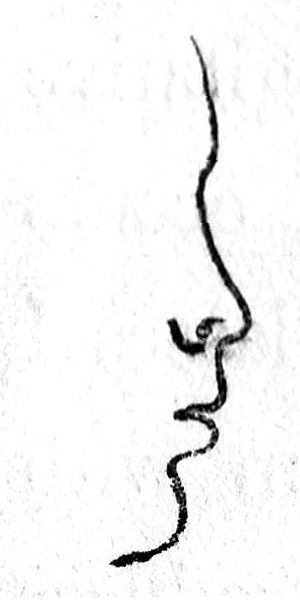
Class V. (Snub Nose)

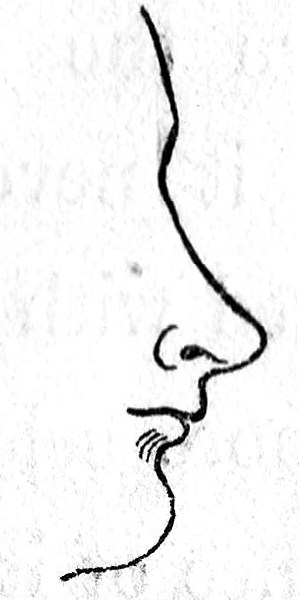
Class VI. (Celestial or Turn-Up Nose)

Below is a sample description.

Class II. The Greek, or Straight Nose, is perfectly straight; any deviation from the right line must be strictly noticed. If the deviation tend to convexity, it approaches the Roman Nose, and the character is improved by an accession of energy; on the other hand, when the deviation is towards concavity, it partakes of the “Celestial,” and the character is weakened. It should be fine and well chiselled, but not sharp.

It indicates Refinement of character, Love for the fine arts and belles-lettres, Astuteness, Craft, and a preference for indirect, rather than direct action. Its owner is not without some energy in pursuit of that which is agreeable to his tastes; but, unlike the owner of the Roman Nose, he cannot exert himself in opposition to his tastes. When associated with the Roman Nose, and distended slightly at the end by the Cogitative, it indicates the most useful and intellectual of characters; and is the highest and most beautiful form which the organ can assume.

In addition, the book has chapters "Of Feminine Noses" ("The subject of Nasology would not be complete without some observations on the Feminine Nose, because sex modifies the indications, some of which, though disagreeable and repulsive in a man, are rather pleasing, fascinating, and bewitching in a woman, and vice versâ.") and "Of National Noses" ("Every nation has a characteristic Nose; and the less advanced the nation is in civilization, the more general and perceptible is the characteristic form.").

On importance of the "nasal classification", Warwick maintains: "We all acknowledge the impression given by the mind to the mouth and eyes because they express Temper and Passion - feelings which interest us in our mutual intercourse. The nose is not influenced by feelings which agitate and vary the mind. Unmovable and Unvaried." "The Nose is an important Index to Character."

== Influence ==
Started as a parody, the "science" of nasology, it was taken seriously. During late 19th century nearly all American newspapers and many magazines, including Saturday Evening Post, Harper’s Bazaar, The New York Times, Washington Post, had articles on the topic. It also influenced real medicine and doctors.

Sharrona Pearl described it as "widely read and enduring" and as an example of "tongue-in-cheek treatment of pocket physiognomy" of the 19th century.
