= Savoia Peak =

Mountain peak in Antarctica

Coordinates: 64°51′S 63°26′W

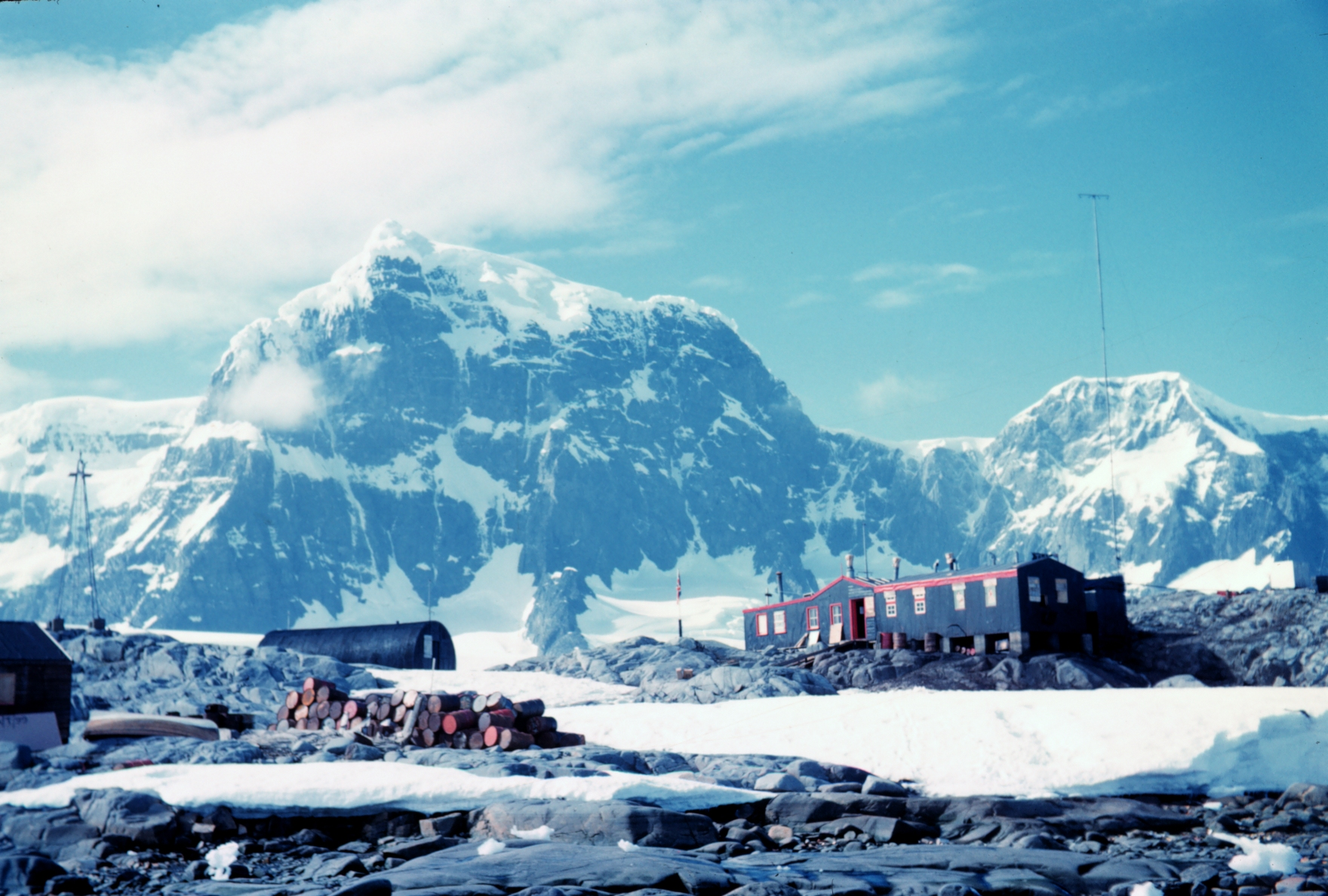
- The abandoned British base at Port Lockroy with Luigi di Savoia Peak in the background

Highest point
- Elevation: 1,415 m (4,642 ft)
- Prominence: 1,415 m (4,642 ft)
- Listing: Ribu

Geography

Savoia Peak is a peak, 1,415 m, at the northeast end of Sierra DuFief, a mountain range in the southwest part of Wiencke Island, in the Palmer Archipelago. Discovered by the Belgian Antarctic Expedition under Gerlache, in 1898, and scaled by members of the French Antarctic Expedition under Charcot, 1903–05. Named by Charcot for Luigi di Savoia, Duke of the Abruzzi.
