= Gauthier Point =

Gauthier Point (64°50′S 63°36′W) is a point which forms the northern extremity of Doumer Island in the Palmer Archipelago. It was discovered by the French Antarctic Expedition, 1903–05, under Jean-Baptiste Charcot, who named it for François Gauthier, builder of the expedition ships Français and Pourquoi-Pas.
