= Dayne Sherman =

American writer

- Born: 1970 (age 55–56); Louisiana
- Occupations: novelist, professor, librarian
- Writing career
- Subjects: crime fiction, "country noir" Louisiana

Dayne Sherman (born 1970) is an American journalist and fiction writer. He has published two novels set in the Baxter Parish, Louisiana, based on the real-life Tangipahoa Parish. Sherman's work has been characterized as "country noir", a term coined by Daniel Woodrell in his 1996 novel Give Us a Kiss.

== Early life and education ==
Sherman was born in Hammond, Louisiana. He attended nearby private and public schools, spending three years in ninth grade and dropping out twice. He took his GED aged 18 and enrolled at Southeastern Louisiana University in Hammond. He earned a BA in communication from Southeastern, then a Master of Library and Information Science degree from Louisiana State University, and an MA in English and creative writing. He studied under Tim Gautreaux and Andrei Codrescu.

== Marriage and family ==
Sherman lives in Ponchatoula, Louisiana, north of New Orleans on the edge of the swamp. He is married and has one son born in 2005. He has a large extended family in southeast Louisiana with hundreds of cousins. He is adopted.

== Career ==
Sherman, by this point a full professor of library science, began publishing short fiction in 2001. Hard to Remember Hard to Forget, a short story chapbook, was published in 2003. His first novel, Welcome to the Fallen Paradise, was published in 2004 by MacAdam/Cage.

Sherman is the founder and co-host of BAM, The Best in American Music Show (originally Bluegrass And More) with Davy Brooks for KSLU 90.9 FM; this show launched on January 6, 2013. Sherman's hobbies include playing vintage guitars, songwriting, hunting, fishing, book collecting, and buying Southern art and antiques.

== Honors ==
Welcome to the Fallen Paradise was selected as the August 2005 Adult Fiction selection for Dearreader.com, a program used by 3,000 libraries. was listed in Booklist magazine's "Hard-Boiled Gazetteer to Country Noir" on May 1, 2012. It was also named a Best Crime Novel Debut of the Year by Booklist in 2005, a "Best Debut" of 2004 by The Times-Picayune, and a Notable Book for January 2005 by the American Booksellers Association Book Sense program.

"Talk About the South" was listed in Pop South's "Have Y'all Heard? Voices from the Southern Blogosphere" by Karen L. Cox in February 2015.

Sherman was given the "Outstanding Faculty Service Award, 2009-2010" by the Southeastern Louisiana University Student Conduct Hearing Board, Judicial Affairs. He also won the 2005-2006 Southeastern Louisiana University President's Award for Excellence in Artistic Activity.

== Works ==
Chapbooks and Novels

- Hard to Remember, Hard to Forget, a limited edition chapbook (Over the Transom, 2003)
- Welcome to the Fallen Paradise: A Novel (MacAdam/Cage, 2004, 2005; reprinted by Accendo Books in 2015)
- Zion: A Novel (Published by Accendo Books on October 30, 2014.)

Short Stories in Anthologies

- "Chemistry." Reprinted in Word and Image: Invitations to a Culture of Composition, 2nd ed. (Boston: Pearson Custom Publishing, 2013), the SLU Dept. of English Custom Reader.
- "Snakebit." Reprinted in Word and Image: Invitations to a Culture of Composition (Boston: Pearson Custom Publishing, 2010), the SLU Dept. of English Custom Reader.
- "Too Late to Change." Reprinted in Roots to Branches: An Ecology of Writing and Reading (Boston: Pearson Custom Publishing, 2007), the Southeastern Louisiana University Dept. of English Custom Reader.
- Chapbooks and Novels
- "Hard to Remember, Hard to Forget." Reprinted in the 2004 edition of Stories from the Blue Moon Café III: Anthology of Southern Writers (San Francisco: MacAdam/Cage). Aug. 2004.

Short Stories

- "Fat Boy: A Memoir." Arkansas Review (Arkansas State University). 2015.
- "Witness: A Louisiana Story." Southeast Louisiana Review (Southeastern Louisiana University). 2014.
- "Security." Big Muddy: A Journal of the Mississippi River Valley (Southeast Missouri State University Press). 2013.
- "Chemistry." The Louisiana Review (Louisiana State University-Eunice). Spring 2011.
- "One More Disaster." The Louisiana Review (Louisiana State University-Eunice). Spring 2009.
- "Too Stupid to Love." Arkansas Review: A Journal of Delta Studies (Arkansas State University). Aug. 2006. Nominated for a Pushcart Prize, Dec. 1, 2006.
- "Man Enough to Buy a Gun." Mississippi Review (University of Southern Mississippi). Partly True Stories Issue. (Summer 2006).
- "Too Late to Change." Country Roads Magazine. Runner-Up for the Summer Fiction Contest. (Baton Rouge, LA). June 2006.
- "Returning Like a Dog." Originally published in The Dead Mule. Web. Nov. 2002 issue. Reprinted in Microcosm (Copiah-Lincoln Community College). Spring 2005. Sherman was also the "featured author" for the issue.
- Chapter 3, an untitled excerpt from Welcome to the Fallen Paradise, a self-contained short story & novel chapter; reprinted in Louisiana Cultural Vistas (New Orleans, LA), the journal of the Louisiana Endowment for the Humanities. Spring 2005.
- "Dogs of Pain." Jabberwock Review (Mississippi State University, Starkville). Winter 2005.
- "Spit." The Powhatan Review (Norfolk, VA). Summer 2004.
- "The Sudden Sting of Memory." The Distillery (Motlow College, Lynchburg, TN). July 2004.
- "The Hole." Country Roads Magazine (Baton Rouge, LA). Print. Reprinted in the June 2003 Local Literature issue. Originally published in The Distillery. Jan. 2002. Reprinted as the prologue in Welcome to the Fallen Paradise.
- "Boys." The Powhatan Review (Norfolk, VA). Summer 2002.
- "Snakebit." Fourteen Hills: The San Francisco State University Review. Winter 2001. Reprinted in Word and Image: Invitations to a Culture of Composition (Boston: Pearson Custom Publishing, 2010), the SLU Dept. of English Custom Reader.

== Social Activism ==
Sherman regularly writes guest editorials and commentaries on politics, K-12 education, pension reform, and higher education issues. His articles appear in the Shreveport Times, the Houma Courier, the Thibodaux Comet, The Political Desk, Louisiana Voice, and Action News 17.

A critic of the former Governor Bobby Jindal, Sherman denounced the governor on the steps of the Louisiana State Capitol on April 30, 2013. Currently a registered Democrat (He has been a Republican and an Independent) Sherman is aligned with progressive causes.
