= Doumer Hill =

Coordinates: 64°51′S 63°34′W

Doumer Hill is a snow-covered pyramidal hill, 515 metres (1,690 ft) high, forming the summit of Doumer Island in the Palmer Archipelago. It was first charted by the French Antarctic Expedition, 1903–05, under Jean-Baptiste Charcot, and was named in 1958 by the UK Antarctic Place-Names Committee, in association with Doumer Island.
