= Nipple Peak =

Peak in Palmer Archipelago, Antarctica

Coordinates: 64°47′S 63°17′W

Nipple Peak is a 675 m (2,215 ft) peak standing 1.9 kilometres (1.2 mi) north-east of Channel Glacier in the northern part of Wiencke Island, in the Palmer Archipelago of Antarctica. It was discovered by the Belgian Antarctic Expedition, 1897–99, under Adrien de Gerlache. The name, which suggests the shape of the feature, was given by the Falkland Islands Dependencies Survey (FIDS) who mapped the peak in 1944.
