= Jabet Peak =

Mountain in Antarctica

Jabet Peak (64°49′S 63°28′W) is a peak in the Comer Range, 545 metres (1,790 ft) high, which marks the southwestern end of the serrate ridge 1 mile (1.6 km) northeast of Port Lockroy, Wiencke Island, in the Palmer Archipelago, Antarctica. It was probably first sighted in 1898 by the Belgian Antarctic Expedition under Gerlache, and was first charted by the French Antarctic Expedition, 1903–05, under Jean-Baptiste Charcot, who named it for Jacques Jabet, boatswain of the expedition ship Français.
