= Cape Errera =

Headland in Antarctica

Cape Errera (64°55′S 63°37′W) is a cape which forms the southwest end of Wiencke Island, in the Palmer Archipelago. It was discovered by the Belgian Antarctic Expedition, 1897–1899, and named by Gerlache for Leo Errera, Paul Errera, and Madame M. Errera, contributors to the expedition.
