= Doumer Island =

Island in Antarctica

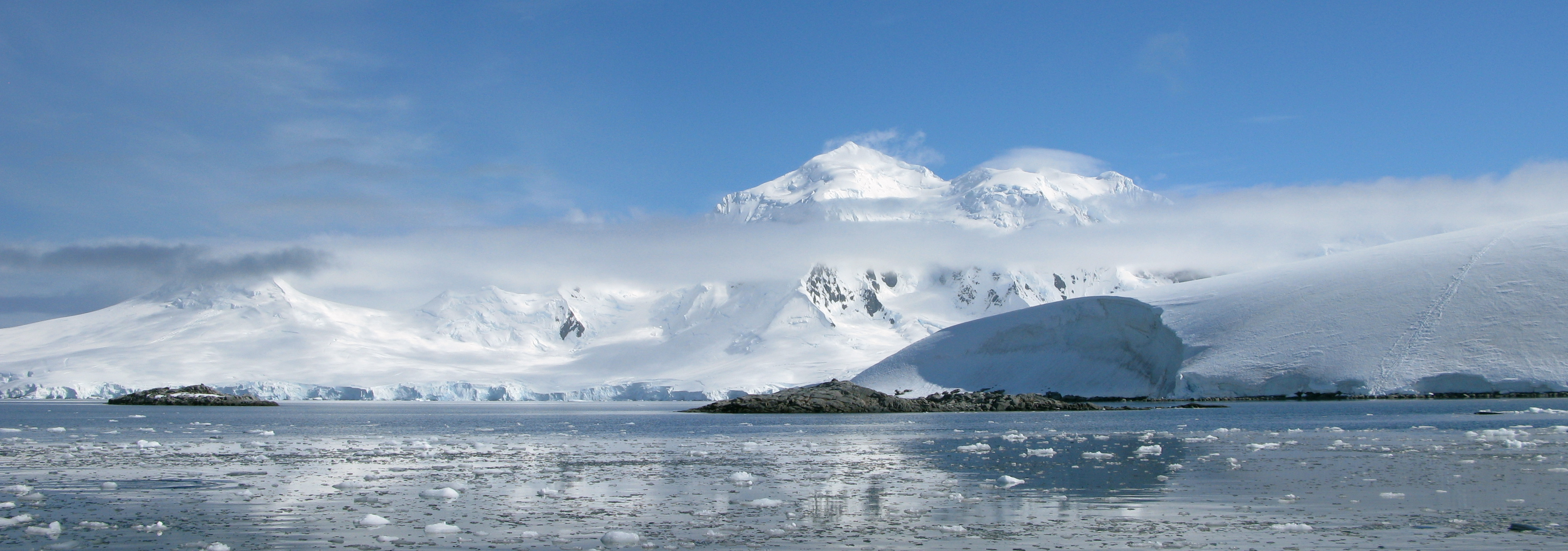
- Image of Doumer Island

- Location of Doumer Island

- Location in Antarctica Doumer Island (Antarctica)

Geography
- Location: Antarctica
- Coordinates: 64°51′S 63°35′W
- Archipelago: Palmer Archipelago
- Length: 8.3 km (5.16 mi)
- Width: 3.7 km (2.3 mi)
- Highest elevation: 515 m (1690 ft)
- Highest point: Doumer Hill

Administration
- Administered under the Antarctic Treaty System

Demographics
- Population: Uninhabited

Doumer Island is an island 8.3 km (4.5 nmi) long and 3.7 km (2 nmi) wide, surmounted by a snow-covered pyramidal peak, 515 m (1,690 ft), lying between the south portions of Anvers Island and Wiencke Island in the Palmer Archipelago of Antarctica. It was first seen by the Belgian Antarctic Expedition, 1897–99, under Adrien de Gerlache. It was resighted and charted by the French Antarctic Expedition, 1903–05, under Jean-Baptiste Charcot, who named it for Paul Doumer, President of the French Chamber of Deputies and later President of France.

== Yelcho Station ==
Chile's summer Yelcho research station, 64°52′33″S 63°35′01″W, administered by the Chilean Antarctic Institute, stands on the southern shore of South Bay.

== Features ==
- Gauthier Point, the northern extremity of Doumer Island
- Homeward Point, the west side of the entrance to Security Bay, on Doumer Island
- Lefèvre-Utile Point, along the north side of Doumer Island
- Stokes Hill

== See also ==
- Gerlache Strait Geology
- List of Antarctic and subantarctic islands
- List of Antarctic research stations
- List of Antarctic field camps
