= Wiencke Island =

Antarctic island

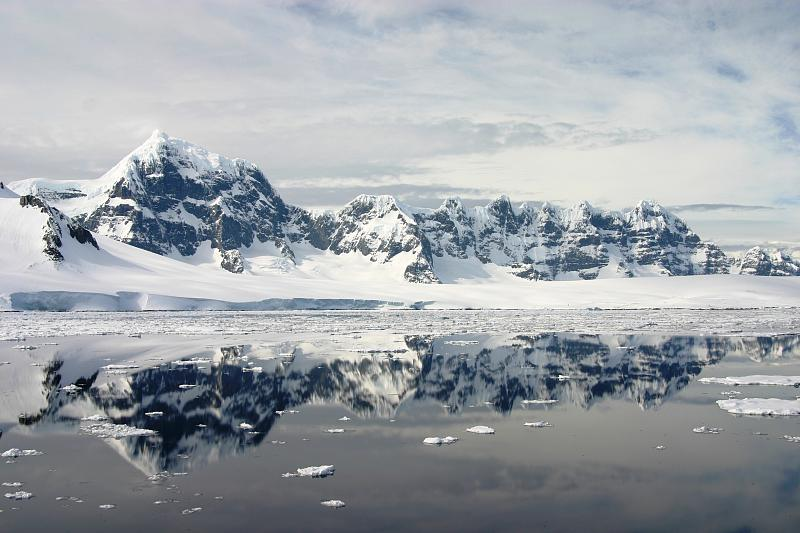
- Luigi peak, Fief Range, Wiencke Island

- Location of Wiencke Island

- Location in Antarctica Wiencke Island (Antarctica)

Geography
- Location: Antarctica
- Coordinates: 64°50′S 63°23′W
- Archipelago: Palmer Archipelago
- Area: 67 km^{2} (26 sq mi)
- Length: 26 km (16.2 mi)
- Width: 5.6 km (3.48 mi)
- Highest elevation: 1,435 m (4708 ft)
- Highest point: Luigi Peak

Administration
- Administered under the Antarctic Treaty System

Demographics
- Population: Uninhabited

Wiencke Island is an island 26 km (16 mi) long and from 3 to 8 km (1.9 to 5.0 mi) wide, about 67 km^{2} (26 sq mi) in area, the southernmost of the major islands of the Palmer Archipelago, lying between Anvers Island to its north across the Neumayer Channel and the west coast of the Antarctic Peninsula to its east across the Gerlache Strait.

== Description ==
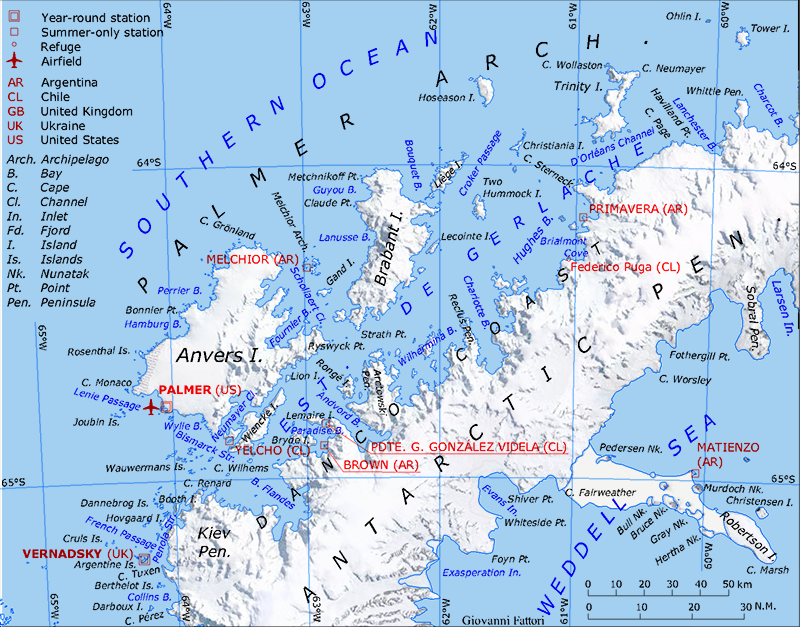
Wiencke Island is located between Anvers Island and the Antarctic Peninsula

The rocky island is mostly covered by glaciers, snow and ice. Some small rocky beaches lie on the western and northern sides of the island. There, some grasses, moss and lichens can be found. There are three mountain ridges, with Nemo Peak, 864 m (2,835 ft) high, to the north-west; Nipple Peak to the north-east; and Luigi Peak, 1,415 m (4,642 ft) high, to the south-west. Luigi Peak is the island's summit, despite it never having been completely surveyed.

Wiencke's northernmost point is Cape Astrup, a bold, dark-colored bluff discovered by the Belgian Antarctic Expedition, 1897–99. It was named by Adrien de Gerlache for Eivind Astrup, Norwegian Arctic explorer and member of Robert Peary's expeditions to Greenland in 1891–92 and 1893–95. The very southeast end of the island is Principal Point, a prominent ice-covered headland lying 4 nautical miles (7 km) east of Cape Errera. Principal Point was first charted by the French Antarctic Expedition under Charcot, 1903–05. The name, applied by the Argentine Antarctic Expedition, 1953–54, suggests the prominence of the feature. Nearby on the southeast coast is Pursuit Point, an Important Bird Area.

Wiencke is surrounded by minor islands, such as Breakwater Island, 33 m (108 ft) high, 8 kilometres (5 mi) north of Cape Astrup. Near the south-east side is Fridtjof Island, 136 m (446 ft) high, connected to Wiencke by a chain of small rocks and islets. In the vicinity of Cape Willems, the south-easternmost extremity of Wiencke, are the Bob Islands, three in number, of volcanic origin, up to 134 m (440 ft) high.

== History ==
=== 19th century ===
The island seems to have been discovered first by Edward Bransfield on board the brig Williams in January 1820, though he named it a cape. In 1829 Henry Foster (scientist) sailed around the island. In 1873 the German Eduard Dallmann was the first to land on the island, and reported it 'a lonely place'. The island was named by Adrien de Gerlache, leader of the 1897–99 Belgian Antarctic Expedition, after Carl August Wiencke, a Norwegian seaman aboard the expedition ship RV Belgica who was washed overboard in a storm in January 1898.

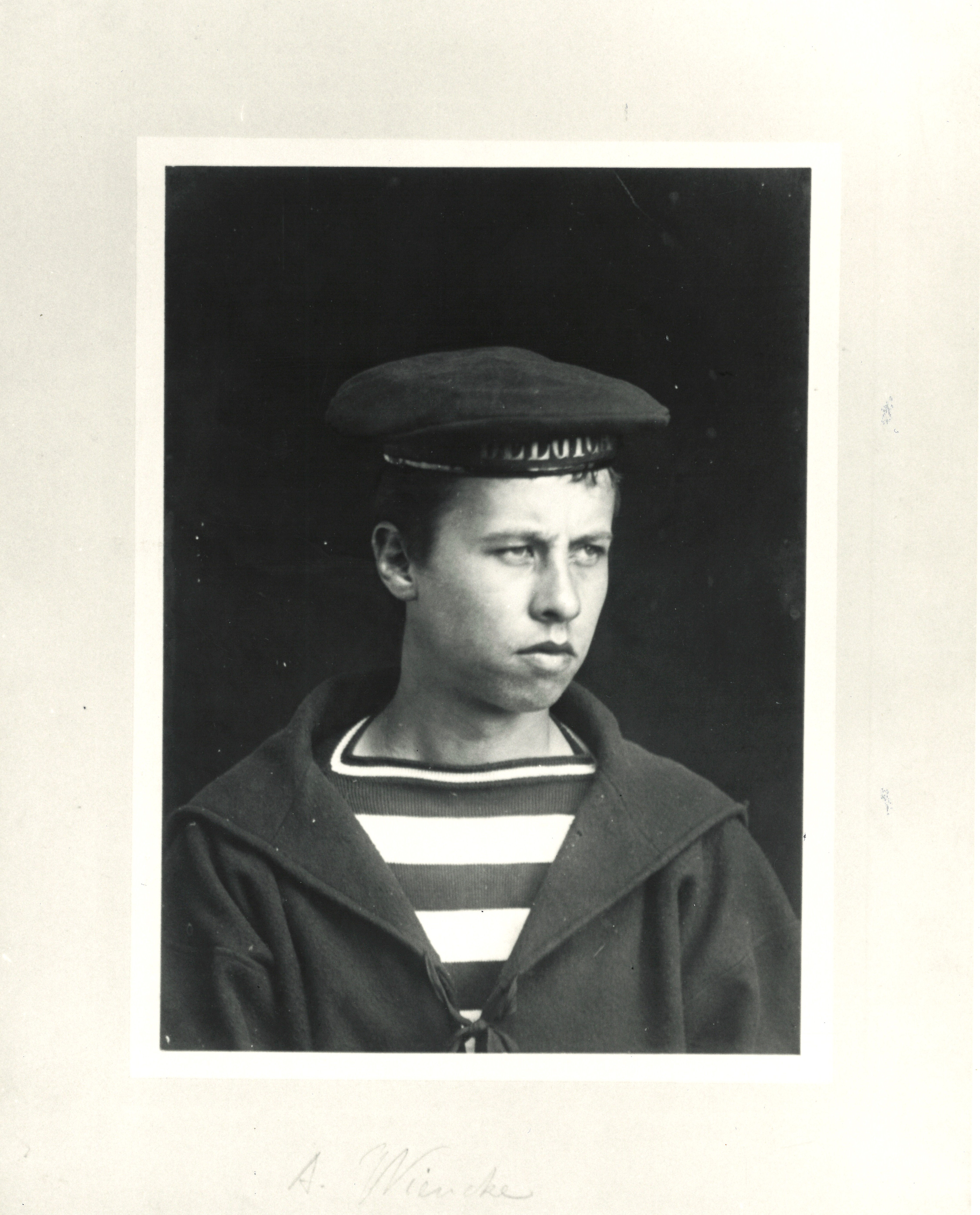
Carl August Wiencke, namesake of the island

=== 20th century ===
Britain set up bases on Deception and in a bay of Wiencke Island in 1944 and another at Hope Bay in 1945, to do weather reporting and to check that there was no German naval activity. Only one of these three bases remains, on Goudier Island in the bay of Port Lockroy, off Jougla Point, near Wiencke Island's south-western end.

An Argentinean light tower was installed in 1947 at Py Point at the southwest end of the Peltier Channel on nearby Doumer Island, and a refuge hut erected in Dorian Bay in 1957, north of Port Lockroy. British Antarctic Survey (BAS) erected a staging hut, known as the Damoy Point refuge, near this Argentinean refuge in 1975 to act as a base for a temporary summer aircraft ice-strip. This was taken out of use in 1995, and stands restored as a historic site.

Another scientific station (Yelcho) was established in 1962 by the Chilean Navy in South Bay on nearby Doumer Island. An emergency shelter was built in 1957 in Alice Creek 150 m south of Goudier Island on the east coast of the island, followed two years later by a larger hut, for use when maintaining a low-frequency electromagnetic aerial and remote receiving equipment. These two huts were removed in 1996 when derelict while Base 'A' on Goudier Island was restored.

== Features ==
- Comer Range
  - Jabet Peak
  - Noble Peak
- Dayné Peak
- Tombstone Hill

== See also ==
- Gerlache Strait Geology
- List of Antarctic and subantarctic islands
