= Pete's Pillar =

Sea stack in the South Shetland Islands

Coordinates: 63°0′S 60°33′W

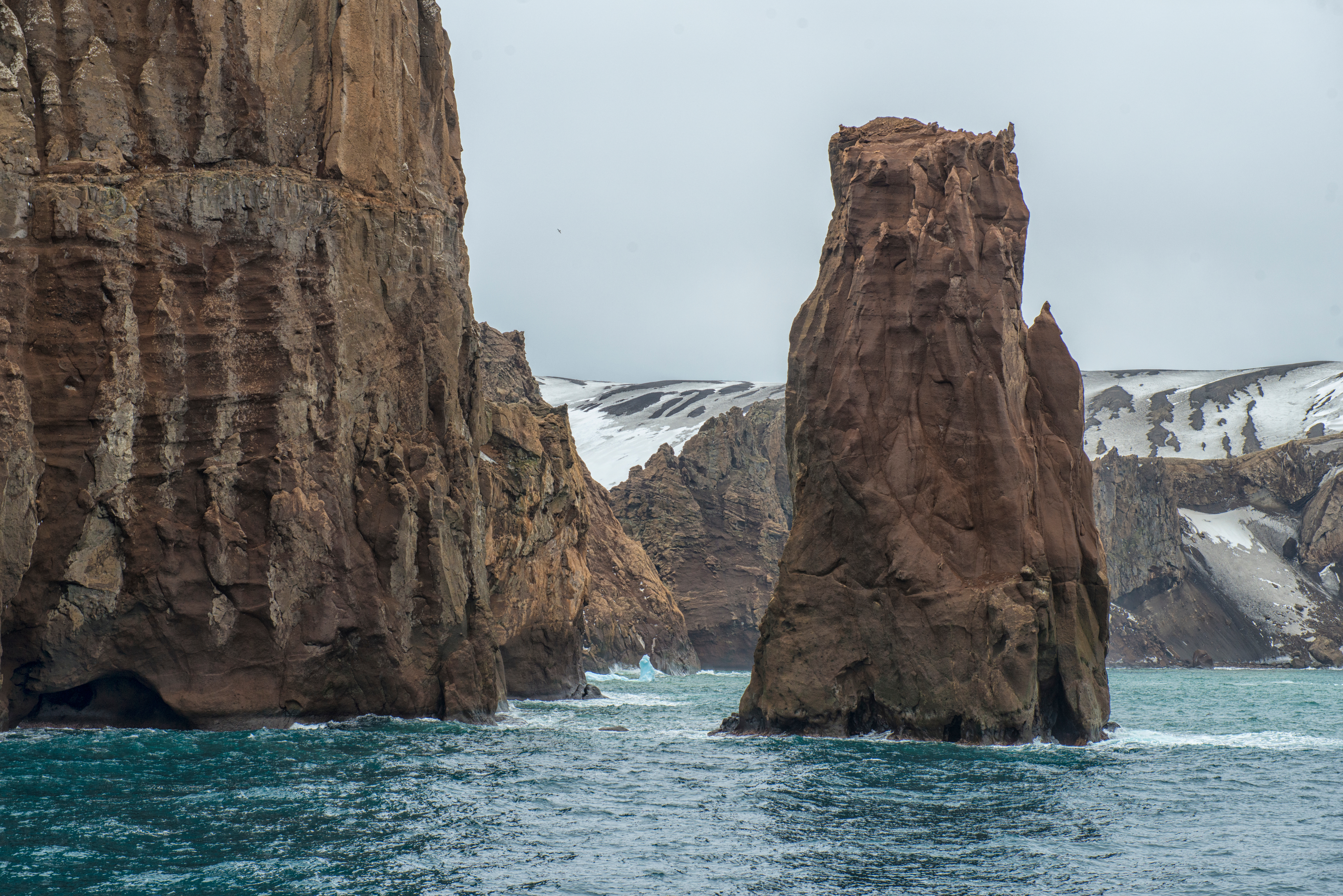
Pete's Pillar

Pete's Pillar is a pillar rock or stack lying immediately east of Fildes Point at the north side of the entrance to Port Foster, Deception Island, in the South Shetland Islands. The pillar was presumably a well-known landmark to early sealers at Deception Island and appears on the chart drawn by Lieutenant E.N. Kendall of the Pilot Officer Pete St. Louis, RCAF, pilot with the Falkland Islands Dependencies Survey (FIDS) in 1949–50.
