= Collins Point =

Collins Point Lighthouse
- Location: Deception Island, South Shetland Islands, Collins Point, Antarctica
- Coordinates: 62°59′45″S 60°35′11″W

Tower
- Construction: fiberglass (tower), concrete (foundation)
- Height: 3 m (9.8 ft)
- Shape: cylinder
- Markings: White, Stripe (red, horizontal direction)
- Power source: solar power

Light
- Focal height: 10 m (33 ft)
- Range: 6 nmi (11 km; 6.9 mi)
- Characteristic: Fl W 5s

Collins Point is a small but prominent headland 1.4 km (0.87 mi) west-south-west of Fildes Point, on the south side of Port Foster, Deception Island, in the South Shetland Islands of Antarctica. It was charted by a British expedition under Foster, 1828–31. It was named by Lieutenant Commander D.N. Penfold, Royal Navy, following his survey of the island in 1948–49, for Rear Admiral Kenneth Collins of the Hydrographic Department of the Admiralty.

== Antarctic Specially Protected Area ==
The site forms part of an Antarctic Specially Protected Area (ASPA 140), comprising several separate sites on Deception Island, and designated as such primarily for its botanic and ecological values.

== See also ==
- List of lighthouses in Antarctica
