= Entrance Point =

Geographical point in Neptunes Bellows

Entrance Point (63°0′S 60°33′W) is a point marking the south side of Neptunes Bellows, the entrance to Port Foster, Deception Island, in the South Shetland Islands. Deception Island was known to sealers in the area as early as 1821. The point was named by the Hydrographic Department of the Admiralty following a survey by Lieutenant Commander D.N. Penfold, Royal Navy, in 1948–49.
