= South East Point (South Shetland Islands) =

Coordinates: 62°59′S 60°31′W

South East Point is a point 1.9 km (1.2 mi) east-north-east of Fildes Point, marking the south-eastern point of Deception Island, in the South Shetland Islands of Antarctica. It was charted by a British expedition 1828–31, under Henry Foster. The name was proposed in 1949 by the Hydrographic Department of the Admiralty, following a survey of the island by Lieutenant Commander D.N. Penfold, Royal Navy, in 1948–49.

== Antarctic Specially Protected Area ==
The point forms part of an Antarctic Specially Protected Area (ASPA 140), comprising several separate sites on Deception Island, and designated as such primarily for its botanic and ecological values.
