= Ravn Rock =

Ravn Rock (63°0′S 60°34′W) is a submerged rock lying in the center of Neptune's Bellows, the entrance to Port Foster, Deception Island, in the South Shetland Islands. Charted by the French Antarctic Expedition under Charcot, 1908–10. Named for the whale catcher Ravn, based at Deception Island at that time.
