= Cathedral Crags =

Cathedral Crags (63°0′S 60°34′W) is a rocky, ice-free hill with steeply cliffed sides, 140 metres (460 ft) high, surmounting the peninsula between Neptune's Window and Fildes Point on the southeast side of Deception Island, in the South Shetland Islands. Although the feature was called The Convent or Weathercock Hill by the whalers operating from Deception Island in the period before 1930, these names have not been used recently. The name Cathedral Crags was reported in 1953 to have become well established in local use at the nearby Falkland Islands Dependencies Survey station.
