= Sewing-Machine Needles =

Rock formations in Antarctica

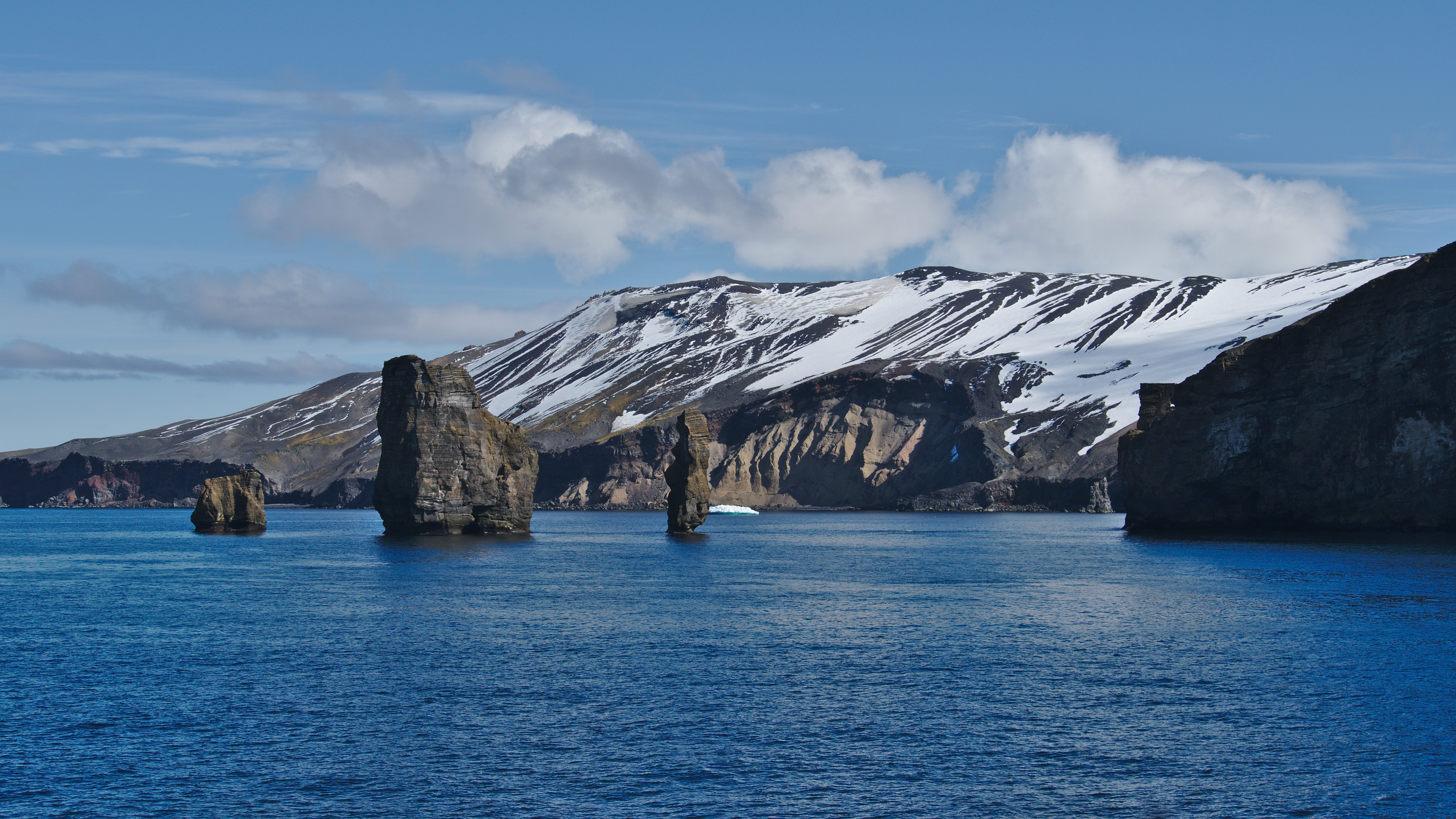

- Location within Antarctic Peninsula Location within Antarctica

Geography
- Location: Antarctica
- Coordinates: 62°58′11.8″S 60°29′39.1″W
- Archipelago: South Shetland Islands

Administration
- Antarctica
- Administered under the Antarctic Treaty System

Demographics
- Population: uninhabited

Sewing-Machine Needles, also known as Rocas Ministro Ezcurra (62°58′11.8″S 60°29′39.1″W) is a group of three prominent rock needles, the highest 45 m above water, lying close southeast of Rancho Point, Deception Island, in the South Shetland Islands. The name Sewing-Machine Rock was given by whalers for what was originally a conspicuous natural arch. Needles is now considered the more suitable descriptive term; an earthquake tremor in 1924 caused the arch to collapse. The name Rocas Ministro Ezcurra was given by Dr Douglas (later Sir Douglas) Mawson, leader of the Australasian Antarctic Expedition of 1912-14.

These rocks are remnants of a tuff cone, part of the Baily Head Formation.

== See also ==
- Composite Antarctic Gazetteer
- List of Antarctic islands south of 60° S
- SCAR
- Territorial claims in Antarctica
