= Neptune's Window =

Neptune’s Window
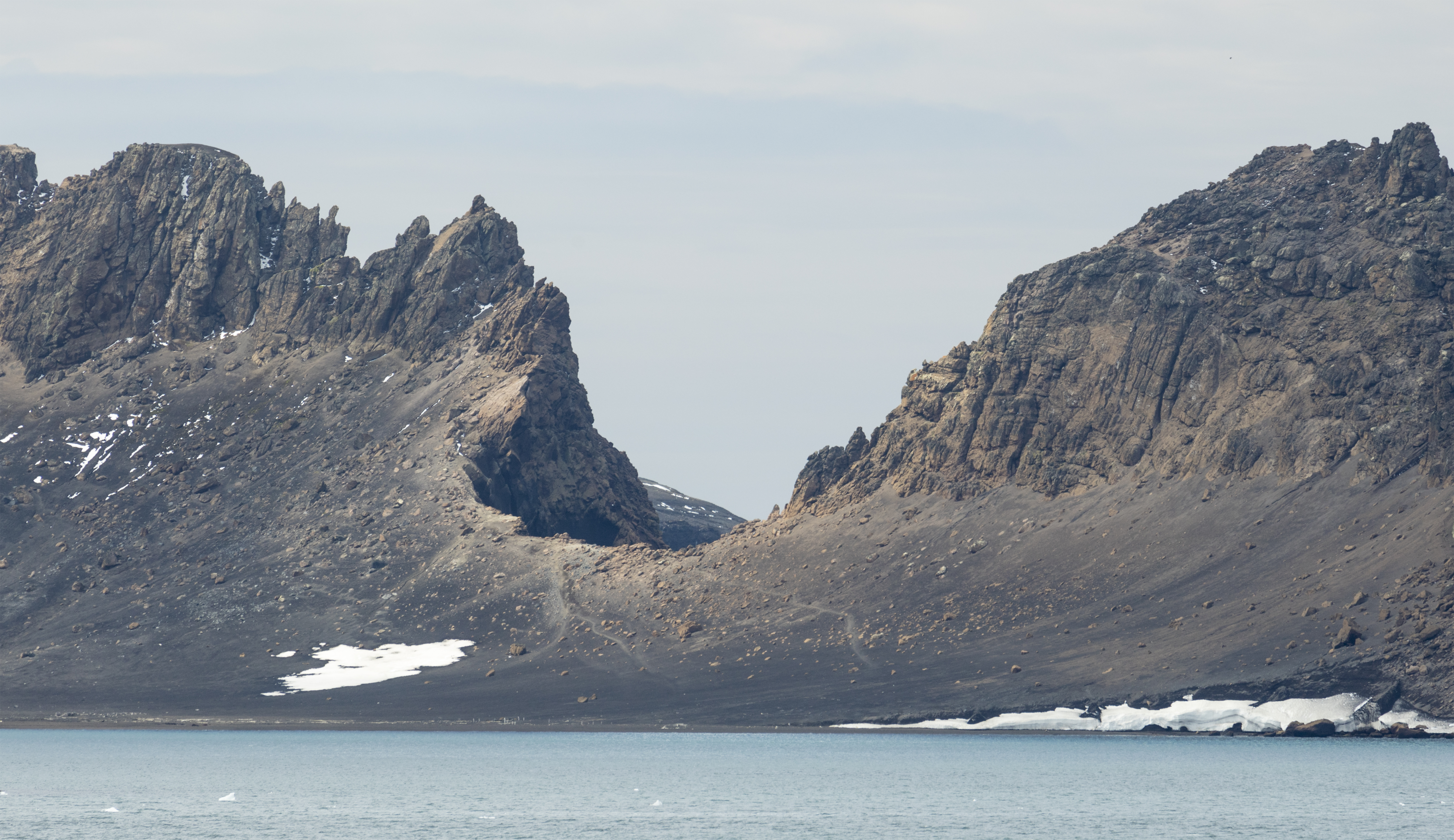
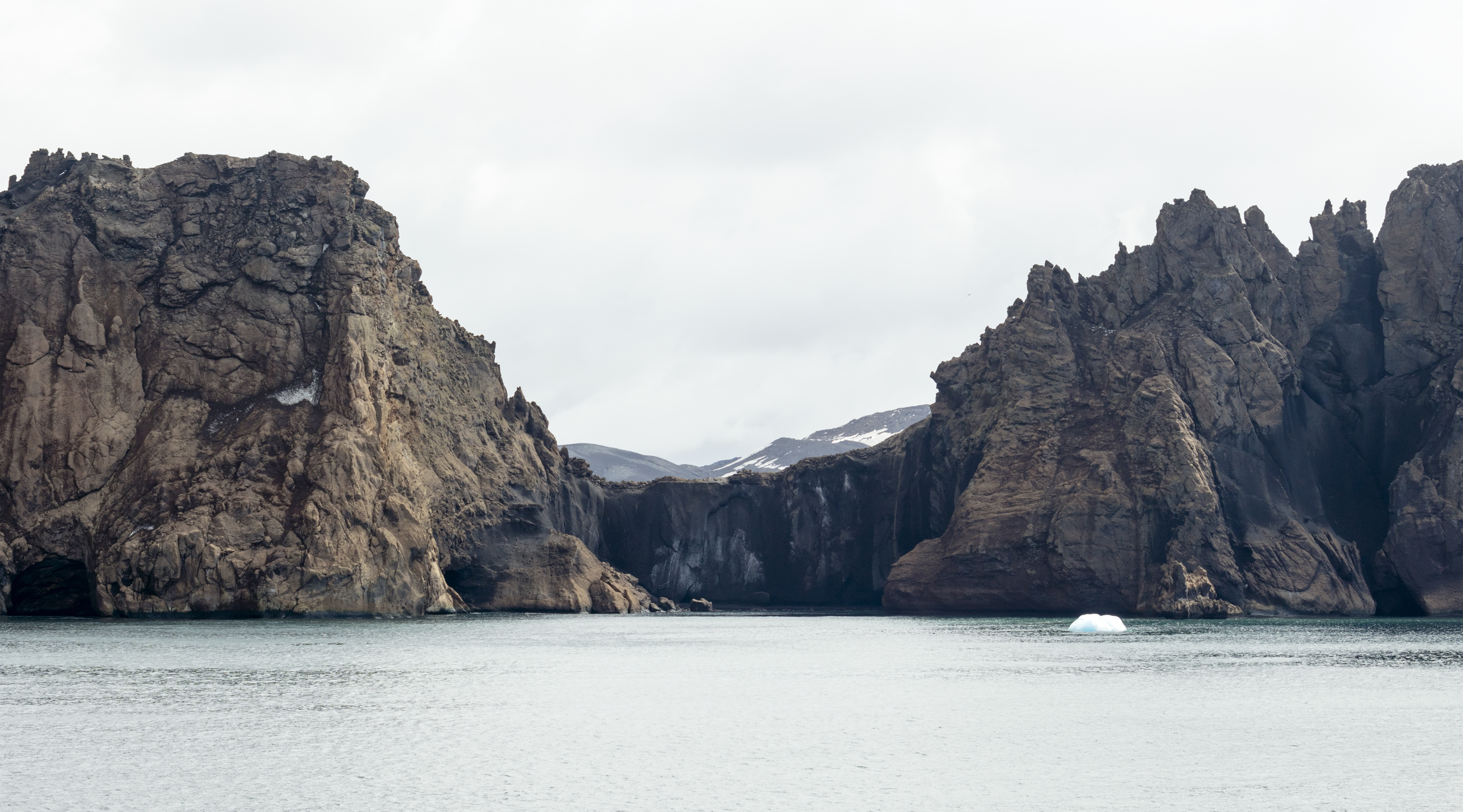
Inside the caldera looking out (top)
Outside the caldera looking in (bottom)

Neptune's Window (62°59′S 60°33′W) is a narrow gap between two rock pillars, situated close east of Whalers Bay on the southeast side of Deception Island, in the South Shetland Islands. So named by Lieutenant Commander D.N. Penfold, Royal Navy, following his survey of Deception Island in 1948–49, because weather and ice conditions in the approach to Neptunes Bellows could conveniently be observed from this gap.
