= Crater Lake (South Shetland Islands) =

Lake of the South Shetland Islands, Antarctica

Coordinates: 62°59′S 60°40′W

Crater Lake is a volcanic crater, now filled with water, lying north-west of Mount Kirkwood on the south side of Deception Island, in the South Shetland Islands of Antarctica. The descriptive name was given by the United Kingdom Antarctic Place-Names Committee (UK-APC) in 1959.

== Antarctic Specially Protected Area ==
The site forms part of an Antarctic Specially Protected Area (ASPA 140), comprising several separate sites on Deception Island, and designated as such primarily for its botanic and ecological values.
