= Ronald Hill =

Ronald Hill may refer to:

- Ronald Hill (rugby), Welsh rugby union and rugby league player
- Ronnie Hill (1934–2011), South African international rugby union player
- Ronald Hill (racing driver) (born 1967), American semi-retired professional stock car racing driver
- Ron Hill (1938–2021), English Olympic runner and clothing entrepreneur
- Ronald Hill (South Shetland Islands), a hill in Antarctica
