= Fumarole Bay =

Bay of Deception Island, Antarctica

Coordinates: 62.966°S 60.7°W

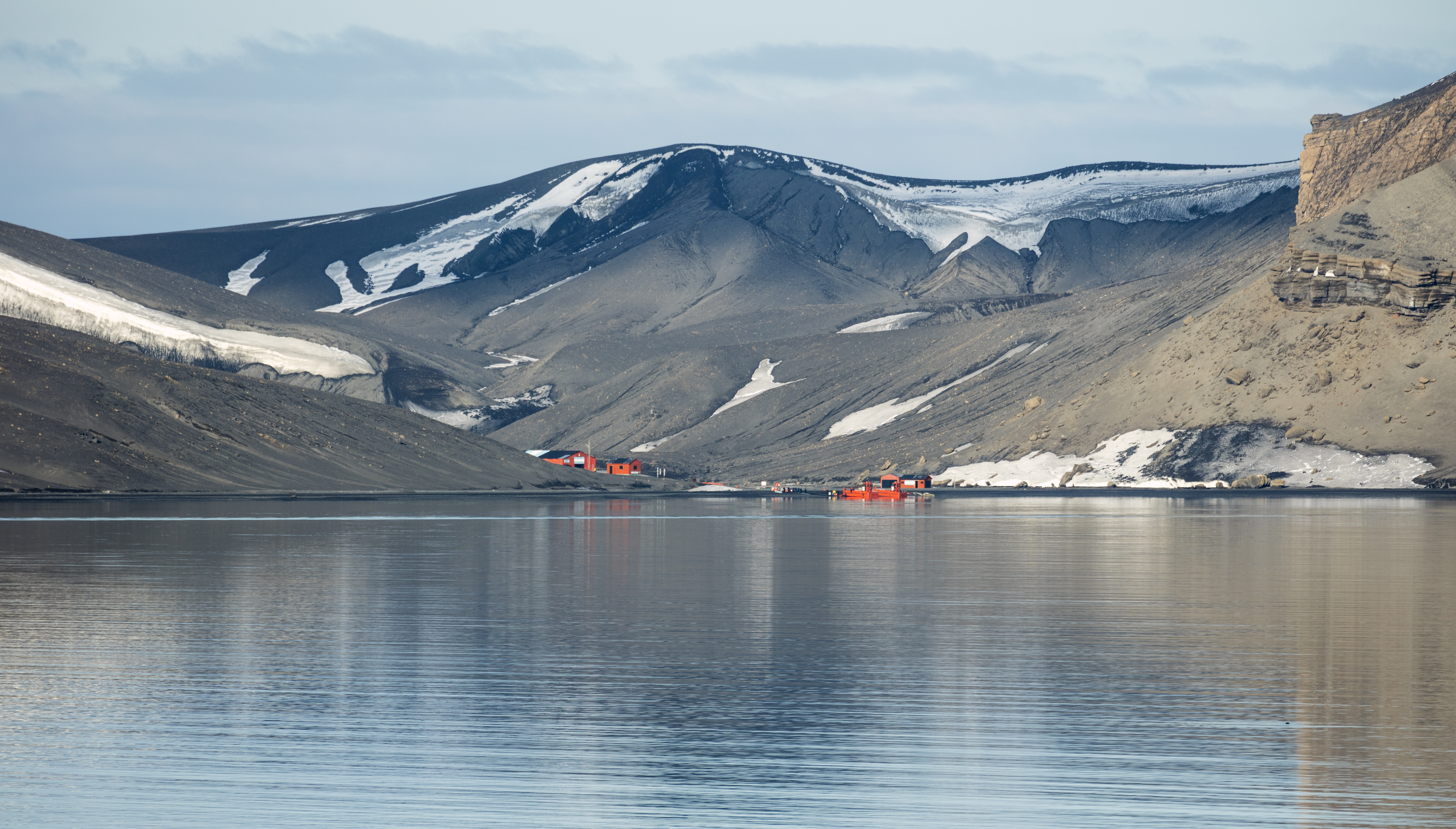
Decepción station on Fumarole Bay

Map of Deception Island

Fumarole Bay is a bay on the southwest side of Port Foster in the interior of Deception Island, in the South Shetland Islands. Having a similar name in the same island is the Vapour Col.

The bay is part of the larger, enclosed water of Port Foster. It was named "Bahia 1 de Mayo" or "Bahia Primero de Mayo" by the Argentine Antarctic Expedition of 1942–43, after the 1 de Mayo, an expedition ship which visited Deception Island in 1942 and 1943; she sank off the coast of Argentina on 5 February 1944.

The Falkland Islands Dependencies Survey carried out a full survey in 1953-54. Aerial photography was carried out by the Falkland Islands and Dependencies Aerial Survey Expedition of 1956-57. After this, the bay was named 'Fumarole Bay' because the most active fumarole on the island is situated here.

Fumaroles at the bay are in the temperature range of 100-107 °C.

== See also ==
- Wensleydale Beacon
