= Baily Head =

Headland in Antarctica

Coordinates: 62°58′S 60°30′W

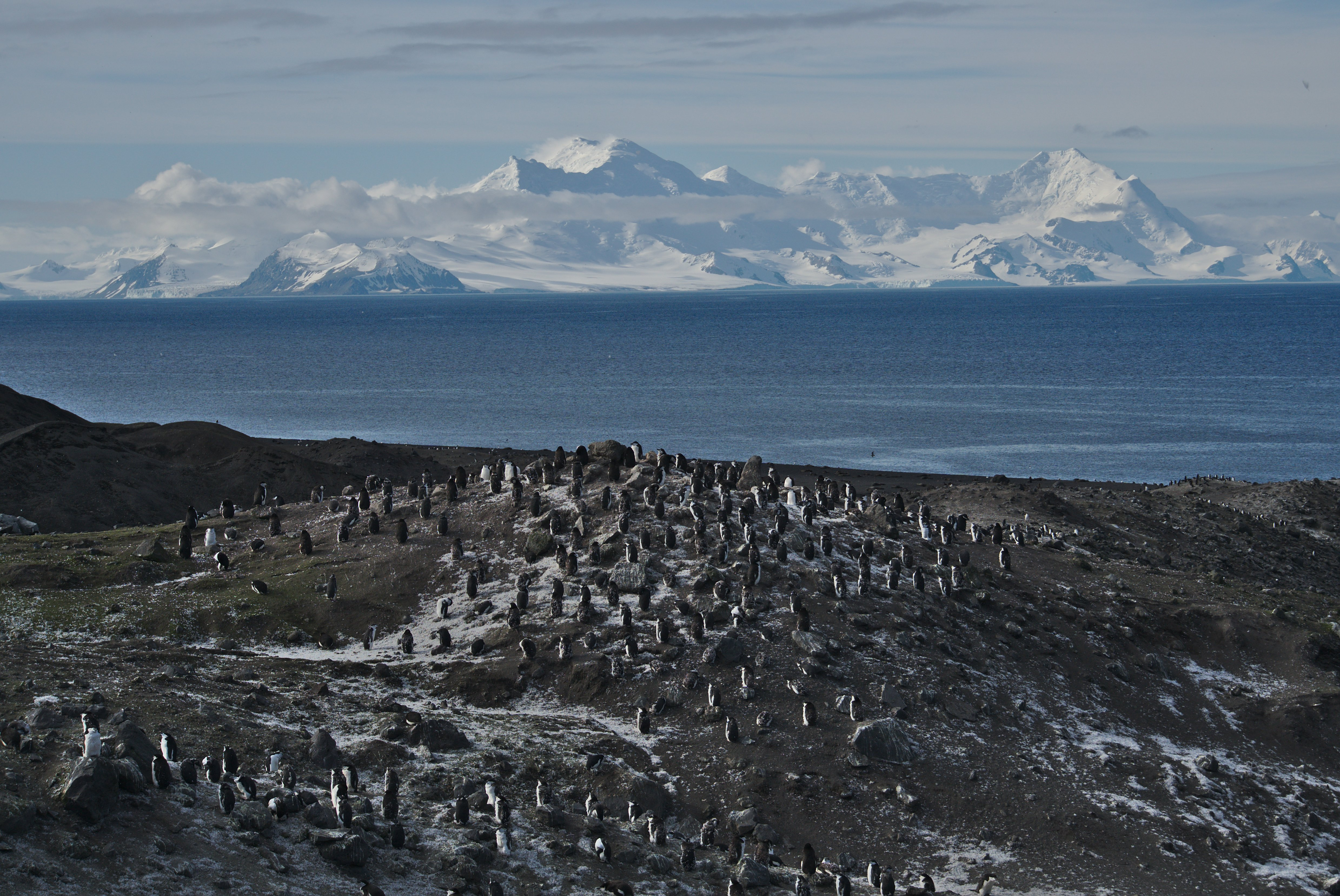
Baily Head

Bail Head forms the easternmost part of Deception Island

Baily Head is a prominent headland, 160 m high, forming the easternmost extremity of Deception Island, in the South Shetland Islands of Antarctica.

== Important Bird Area ==
The headland has been identified as an Important Bird Area (IBA) by BirdLife International because it supports a very large breeding colony of chinstrap penguins (100,000 pairs). The 78 ha IBA comprises the ice-free headland and about 800 m of black sand beach on either side of it. Other birds known to nest at the site include brown skuas, Cape petrels and snowy sheathbills. Antarctic fur seals frequently haul out along the beaches, while Weddell, crabeater, leopard and southern elephant seals have also been recorded.
