= Deception Station =

- Antarctic base
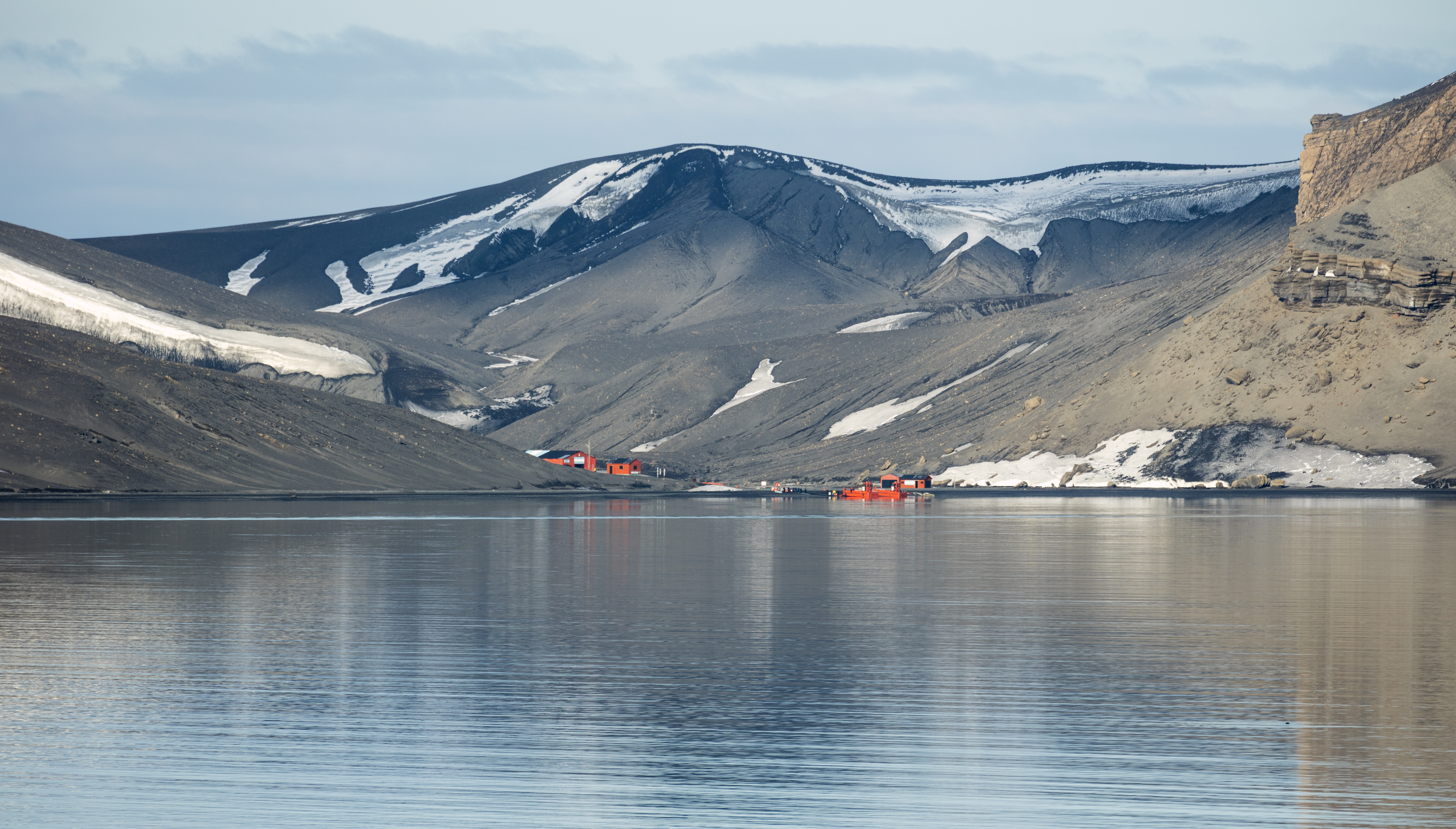
- Base Decepción in 2016

- Location of Deception Station in Antarctica
- Coordinates: 62°58′31″S 60°41′52″W
- Country: Argentina
- Location in Antarctica: Deception Island; South Shetland Islands
- Administered by: Instituto Antártico Argentino
- Established: 25 January 1948
- Elevation: 7 m (23 ft)

Population (2017)
  - Summer: 18
  - Winter: 3
- Type: Seasonal
- Period: Summer
- Status: Operational
- Activities: List: Seismology; Volcanogy; Geomorphology
- Website: Dirección Nacional del Antártico

Deception Station (Spanish: Base Decepción) is an Argentine antarctic base located at Deception Island, South Shetland Islands.

== History ==
The station was founded on January 25, 1948 by Argentina. In 1950 a seismograph was installed in the base, and in 1951 it also received ionospheric equipment. In 1993 a volcano observatory was opened.

Initially, it operated year-round, serving as a hub for scientific research and exploration. However, in December 1967, violent volcanic eruptions forced the evacuation of the base. Since then, Deception Station has been inhabited only during the summer months. The island experienced severe volcanic activity in 1967, 1969, and 1970.

Gabriel de Castilla Base, a Spanish research station, was constructed on Deception Island in the late 1980s. Deception Island has also been home to scientific stations run by Argentina, Chile, Spain, and the United Kingdom.

== Climate ==
Climate data for Deception Island
Month	Jan	Feb	Mar	Apr	May	Jun	Jul	Aug	Sep	Oct	Nov	Dec	Year
Mean daily maximum °C (°F)	3 (37)	3 (37)	2 (35)	−1 (31)	−3 (27)	−5 (23)	−6 (21)	−6 (22)	−3 (26)	−1 (31)	0 (32)	2 (36)	−1 (30)
Mean daily minimum °C (°F)	−1 (31)	−1 (31)	−2 (29)	−4 (24)	−7 (19)	−10 (14)	−12 (11)	−11 (12)	−8 (17)	−5 (23)	−4 (25)	−1 (30)	−6 (22)
Average precipitation mm (inches)	58 (2.3)	53 (2.1)	69 (2.7)	51 (2)	5.1 (0.2)	7.6 (0.3)	15 (0.6)	25 (1)	23 (0.9)	110 (4.3)	97 (3.8)	51 (2)	560 (22.2)
Source: Weatherbase

== See also ==
- Gabriel de Castilla Base
- List of Antarctic research stations
- List of Antarctic field camps
