= Mount Kirkwood =

Mountain in Deception Island, South Shetland Islands, Antarctica

Mount Kirkwood (63°0′S 60°39′W) is a mountain, 460 m, standing 3 nautical miles (6 km) west of Entrance Point in the south part of Deception Island, in the South Shetland Islands. First charted by a British expedition 1828–31, under Foster. Named in 1950 by the United Kingdom Antarctic Place-Names Committee (UK-APC) for Commander Harry Kirkwood, Royal Navy, master of the John Biscoe in Antarctic waters 1948–50.
