= Stanley Patch =

Shoal in Port Foster, Antarctica

Stanley Patch (62°59′S 60°38′W) is a shoal (shallow water) lying in Port Foster, 2 nautical miles (3.7 km) west-northwest of Fildes Point, Deception Island, in the South Shetland Islands. Named after Stanley, Falkland Islands, by Lieutenant Commander D.N. Penfold, Royal Navy, following his survey in 1948–49.
