= Bynon Hill =

Bynon Hill (62°55′S 60°36′W) is an ice-covered, dome-shaped hill with two rounded summits, 340 metres (1,120 ft) high, standing 1.5 nautical miles (3 km) north of Pendulum Cove, Deception Island, in the South Shetland Islands. The name appears on an Argentine government chart of 1953.
