= Gabriel de Castilla =

Spanish explorer and navigator

Gabriel de Castilla (c. 1577 – c. 1620) was a Spanish explorer and navigator. A native of Palencia, it has been argued that he was the early explorer of Antarctica.

== Biography ==
In March 1603, Castilla was at the head of an expedition that weighed anchor from Valparaíso. Under his control were three ships: the galleon Jesús María, of 600 tons and 30 cannons, Nuestra Señora de la Visitación (which had belonged to Richard Hawkins) and Nuestra Señora de las Mercedes. The expedition was entrusted by the Viceroy of Peru, Luis de Velasco, marqués de Salinas, to suppress the incursions of Dutch privateers in the seas to the south of Chile.

Historians conjecture that they penetrated to a latitude of (64° S) in the Southern Ocean, south of Drake Passage. If correct, this would be the farthest south that anyone had travelled, at that time. Subsequently, several merchant vessels reported being blown south of 60° S rounding Cape Horn in severe weather.

== See also ==
- List of Antarctic expeditions
- Gabriel de Castilla Base
