= Ronald Hill (South Shetland Islands) =

Mountain in the South Shetland Islands

Coordinates: 62°59′S 60°35′W

Ronald Hill is a rocky, ice-free hill, 105 m in height, standing north of Kroner Lake on Deception Island, in the South Shetland Islands of Antarctica. It was charted, photographed and named by Olaf Holtedahl of the Norwegian expedition 1927–28, after the floating factory SS Ronald, which belonged to the Hektor Whaling Company. and was anchored at Deception Island in 1911-12 and many later seasons.

== Antarctic Specially Protected Area ==
The hill forms part of an Antarctic Specially Protected Area (ASPA 140), comprising several separate sites on Deception Island, and designated as such primarily for its botanic and ecological values.
