= Wensleydale Beacon =

Wensleydale Beacon (62°57′S 60°42′W) is a hill, 110 m, situated just north of Fumarole Bay, on the west side of Port Foster, Deception Island, in the South Shetland Islands. The hill was charted by a British expedition 1828–31, under Foster. Named by Lieutenant Commander D.N. Penfold, Royal Navy, following his survey of the island in 1948–49, after Wensleydale in Yorkshire, England.
