= Rancho Point =

Rancho Point (62°58′S 60°30′W) is a conspicuous rock headland, 170 m, marking the east extremity of Deception Island, in the South Shetland Islands. It rises from the sea to become a large rock which, because of its shape, has received the name. The name was proposed by the commander of the Argentine ship Granville in the year 1947 through having observed, by chance, that the feature resembles a hut with a double-pitched roof.
