= Gabriel de Castilla Base =

- Antarctic base
- Base Antártica Española del Ejército de Tierra, Gabriel de Castilla
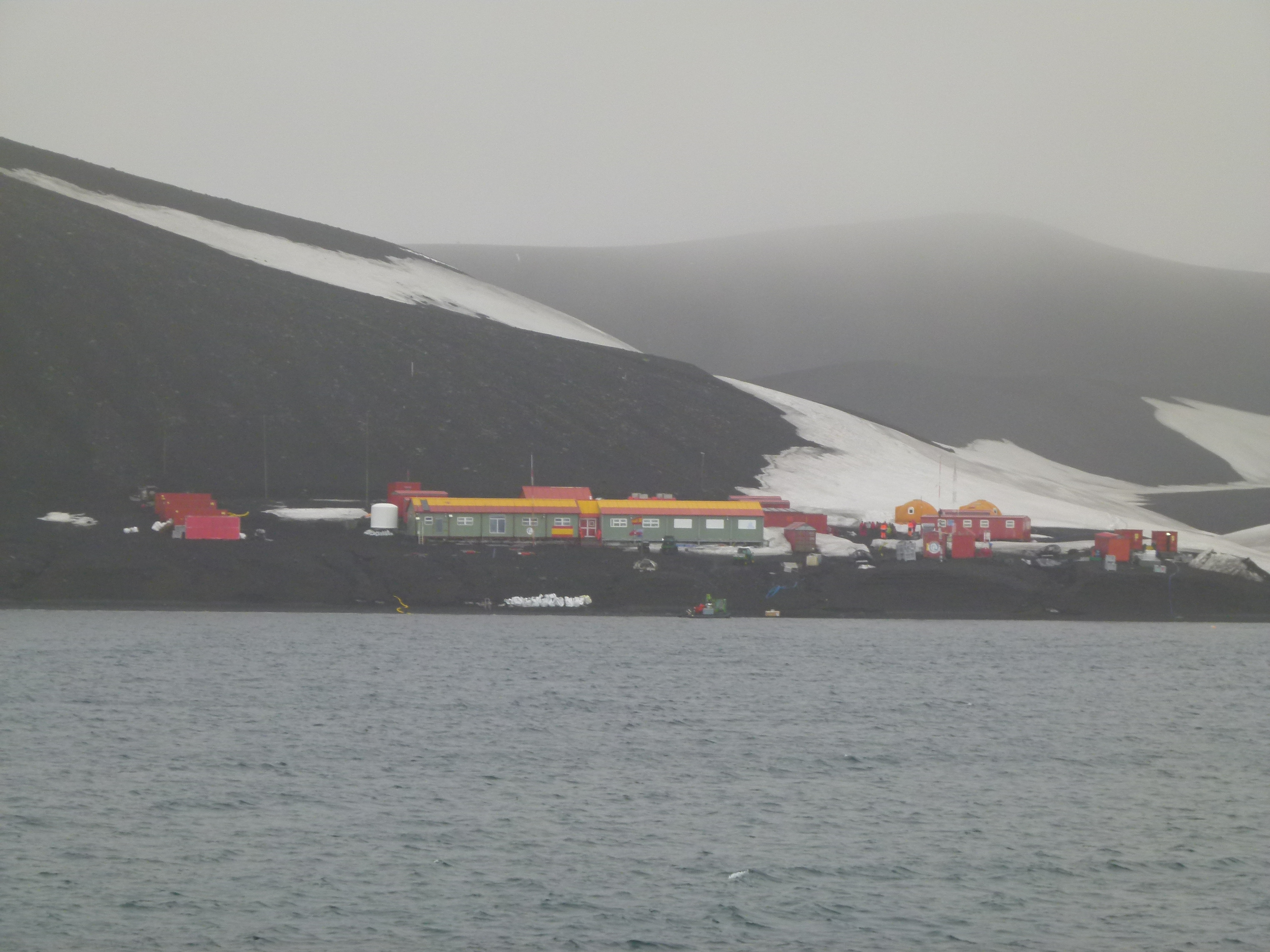
- Gabriel de Castilla Base in 2013

- Flag Seal

- Location of Gabriel de Castilla Base in Antarctica
- Coordinates: 62°58′37″S 60°40′31″W
- Country: Spain
- Location in Antarctica: Deception Island; South Shetland Islands
- Established: 20 December 1989
- Named for: Gabriel de Castilla
- Elevation: 15 m (49 ft)

Population (2017)
  - Summer: 33
  - Winter: 0
- UN/LOCODE: AQ GDC
- Type: Seasonal
- Period: Summer
- Status: Operational
- Activities: List: Geomagnetism; Marine biology; Geology; Seismology

Gabriel de Castilla Base is a Spanish research station located on Deception Island, South Shetland Islands, Antarctica. The station was constructed in late 1989. The station is named for Gabriel de Castilla, a 17th-century Spanish navigator and, according to some reports, the first person to sight mainland Antarctica.

== See also ==
- Juan Carlos I Antarctic Base
- Deception Station
- List of Antarctic research stations
- List of Antarctic field camps
