= Kroner Lake =

Lake in Antarctica

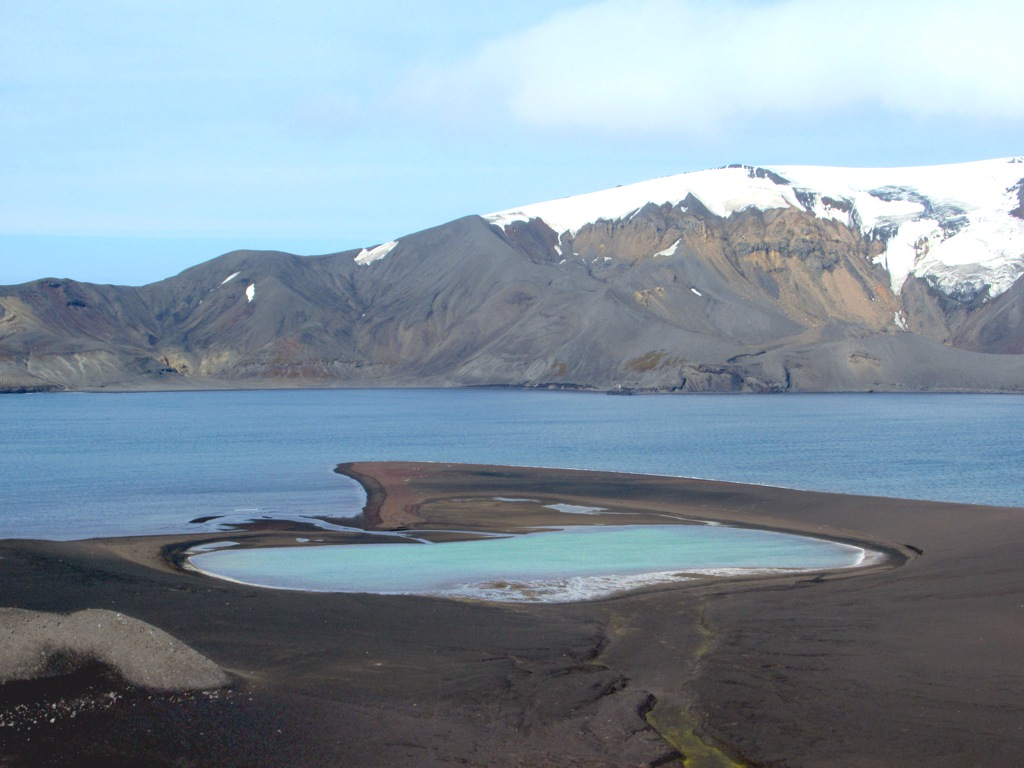

- Location within Antarctica
- Location: Deception Island
- Coordinates: 62°59′00″S 60°35′00″W
- Max. length: 370 m (1,210 ft)
- Max. width: 370 m (1,210 ft)

Kroner Lake is a circular lake 370 m (1,210 ft) in diameter, lying immediately west of Whalers Bay, on Deception Island in the South Shetland Islands of Antarctica. Its old name, "Tokroningen", meaning the two kroner piece, was given by whalers during the period 1905–31. The original name was altered to Kroner Lake in 1950, by the UK Antarctic Place-Names Committee following a survey of Deception Island by Lieutenant Commander D.N. Penfold, Royal Navy, in 1948–49.

== Antarctic Specially Protected Area ==
The lake forms part of an Antarctic Specially Protected Area (ASPA 140), comprising several separate sites on Deception Island, and designated as such primarily for its botanic and ecological values.
