= Fildes Point =

Point in South Shetland Islands, Antarctica

Coordinates: 63°0′S 60°34′W

Fildes Point is a point which forms the north side of Neptunes Bellows, the entrance to Port Foster, Deception Island, in the South Shetland Islands of Antarctica. Deception Island was known to sealers in the area as early as 1821; the point was later named for Robert Fildes, a British sealer in these waters at that early time.

== See also ==
- Stanley Patch
