= Henry Foster (scientist) =

British naval officer and scientist

Henry Foster FRS (1797 – 5 February 1831) was a British naval officer and scientist who took part in expeditions to both the Arctic and Antarctic, and made notable scientific contributions to studies of the figure of the earth and the earth's magnetic field.

== Career ==
Foster was the eldest son of the Rev. Henry Foster of Woodplumpton, Lancashire. He joined the Royal Marines in 1812, serving first aboard HMS York. In 1817 he joined HMS Blossom in which he surveyed the mouth of the Columbia River. In 1819 he joined HMS Creole, and carried out a survey of the north shore of the Río de la Plata. From 1820 to 1822 he served on HMS Conway, commanded by Basil Hall, first as midshipman, then as Master's mate, on a yoyage to South America. In his journal of the voyage, Hall refers to Foster as an "admirable surveyor". Foster carried out a survey of the harbour of Copiapó, and prepared a Hydrographical Memoir, with details of all the ports visited on the voyage. During the voyage, Hall and Foster used an invariable pendulum to determine the gravitational field at numerous locations. This allowed a calculation of the ellipticity of the earth. The value they obtained, 1/301.77, or 0.003314 differs by just over 1% from the modern value of 0.003353. The results were published in the Philosophical Transactions of 1823.

In 1823, he served aboard HMS Griper under the command of Douglas Clavering and with the astronomer Edward Sabine in a voyage to Svalbard and East Greenland. He assisted in surveying and in more pendulum observations. He was elected a Fellow of the Royal Society in 1824, and was promoted to Lieutenant in the same year.

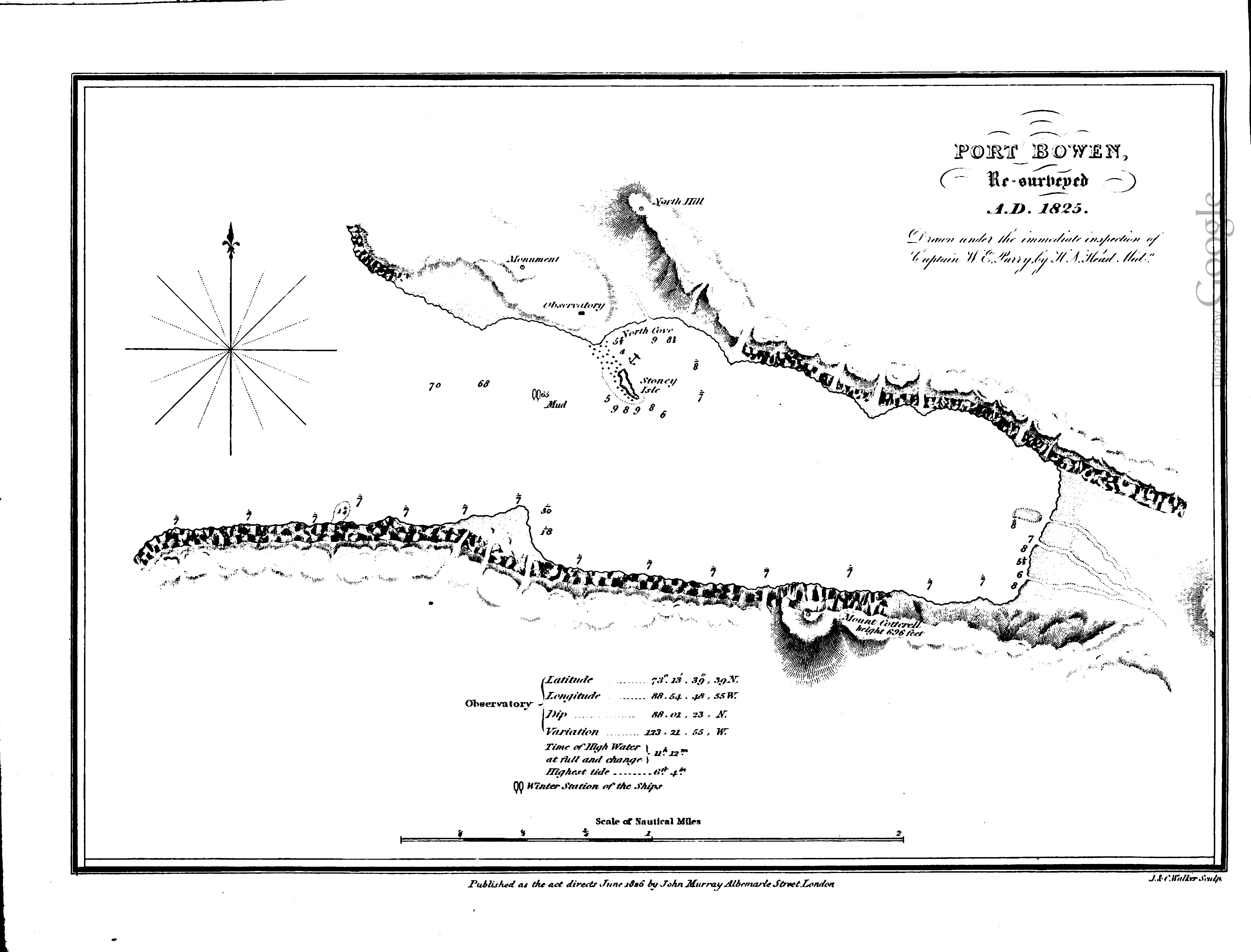
1825 chart of Port Bowen, from Parry (1826)

In 1824 and 1825 he was part of Parry's third voyage for the discovery of a Northwest Passage, as third Lieutenant of HMS Hecla and assistant surveyor. The Winter of 1824-1825 was spent in Port Bowen, on the east side of Prince Regent Inlet. They set up an observatory, and Foster used a Dollond Transit instrument to determine their longitude using the method of moon-culminating stars. He published a comparison of this method with lunar distances and occultations of stars by the moon. During the expedition he continued his pendulum experiments, and also made many observations on the Earth's magnetic field. The results were published in 1826 as a complete issue of the Philosophical Transactions. For this work he was awarded the Royal Society's Copley Medal in 1827. On the day the medal was delivered, Foster was promoted to Commander, and the assignment to his next command, in the South Altlantic, was confirmed.

In 1826 Captain Basil Hall had suggested a naval expedition "for the express purpose of research". This suggestion was taken up by the Board of Longitude and the Royal Society. The Board sponsored the voyage, and a Royal Society committee including Francis Beaufort and the astronomer John Herschel contributed to the programme of investigation. The goals were to continue the programme of pendulum experiments, to determine the longitudes of various ports and important landmarks, and to carry out observations of meteorology, geomagnetism, and ocean currents.

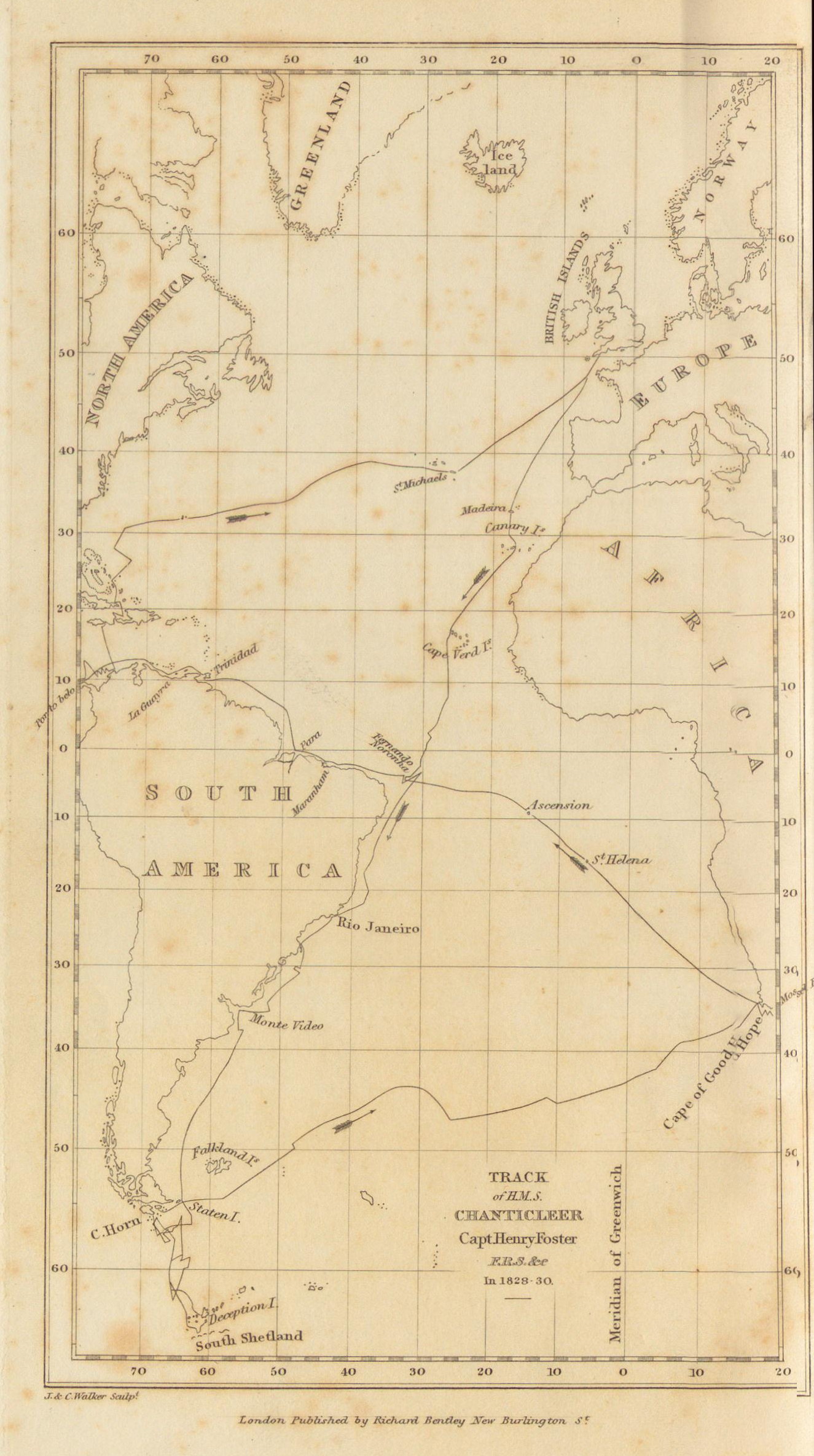
Track of HMS Chanticleer 1828-1831

The ship chosen for the British Naval Expedition to the South Atlantic, commanded by Foster, was HMS Chanticleer, and the voyage lasted from 1828 to 1831. Their route took them across the Atlantic to the island of Fernando de Noronha off the N.E coast of Brazil, then to Rio de Janeiro, Montevideo, Staten Island, and then to Cape Horn and the Wollaston Islands, which he named after the British chemist William Hyde Wollaston. They then sailed south to the South Shetland Islands, just north of the Antarctic Peninsula, and at that time the most southerly land known. Foster and Lieutenant Kendall landed and explored Deception Island.

They then crossed back over the Atlantic to the Cape of Good Hope, where they rated their chronometers, then back once more to Fernando de Noronha via Saint Helena and Ascension Island. On Fernando de Noronha, they were given considerable assistance by the Governor, who let Foster use part of his own house for the pendulum experiments. They then sailed along the north coast of South America to Darien to establish the positions of locations on the Atlantic and Pacific coasts, transporting chronometers across the isthmus and using rockets as time signals. While carrying out these observations, Foster drowned in the Chagres River in 1831 after slipping and falling overboard. After Foster's death, Chanticleer made a few more observations in Porto Bello, Jamaica, Bermuda, and the Azores, before returning to Falmouth where she arrived on 17 May 1831.

The narrative of the voyage was written by the ship's surgeon, W.H.B. Webster, and published in 1834 It was considered very important because of his observations on the southern hemisphere. It was translated into French and republished in 1849. The results of the pendulum experiments were published by the astronomer Francis Baily, also in 1834.

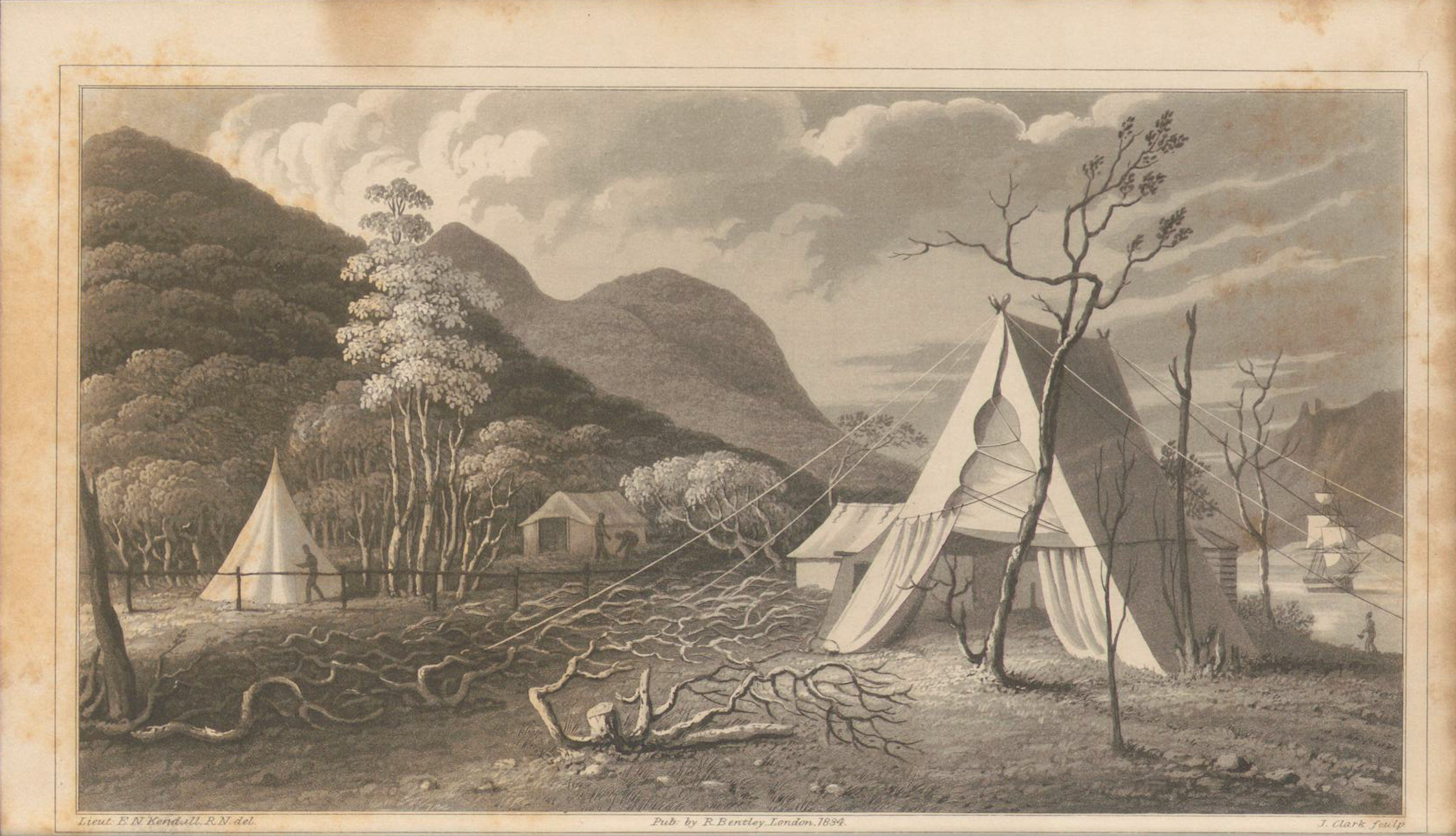
Pendulum Station on Staten Island

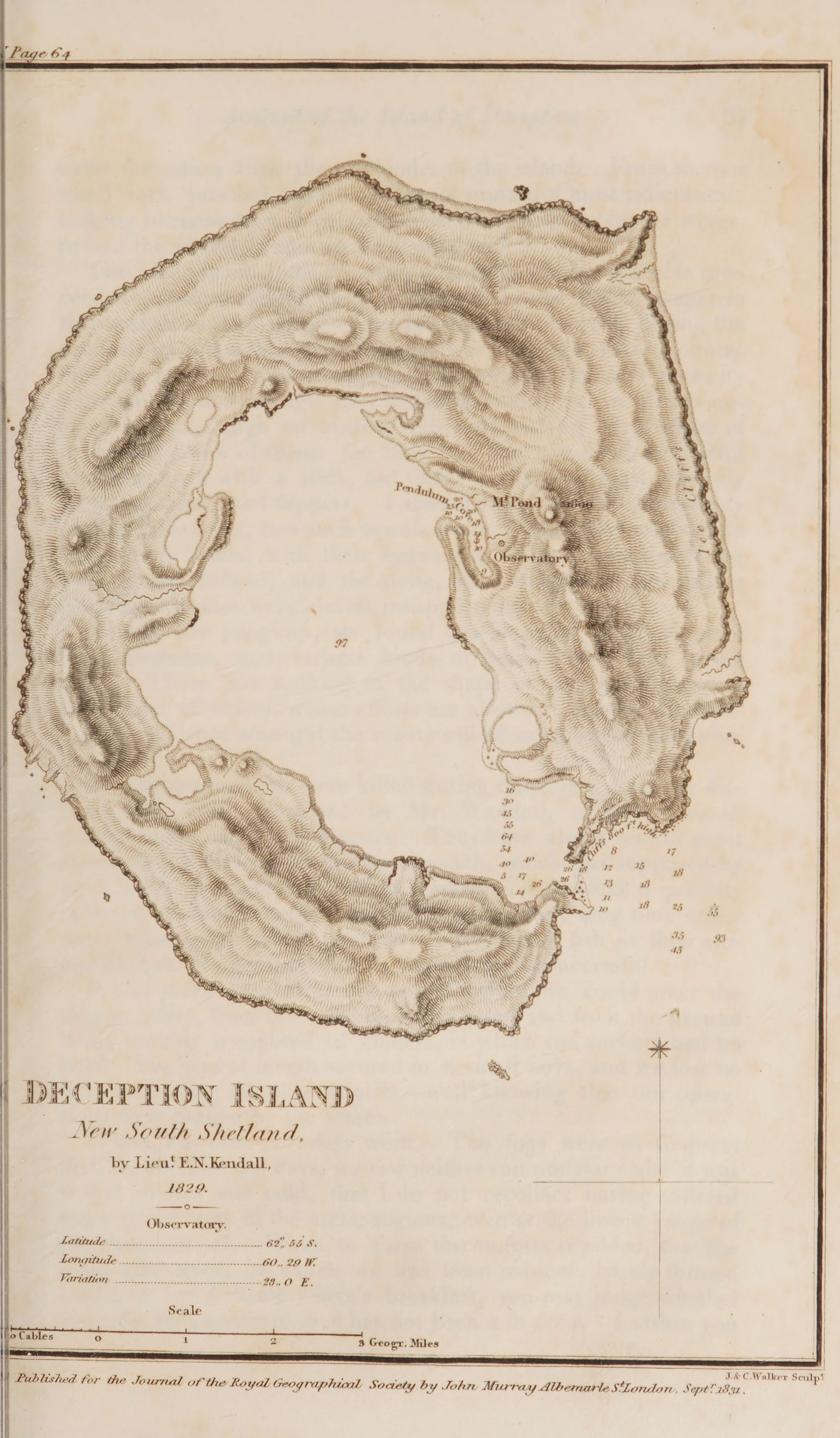
Chart of Deception Island

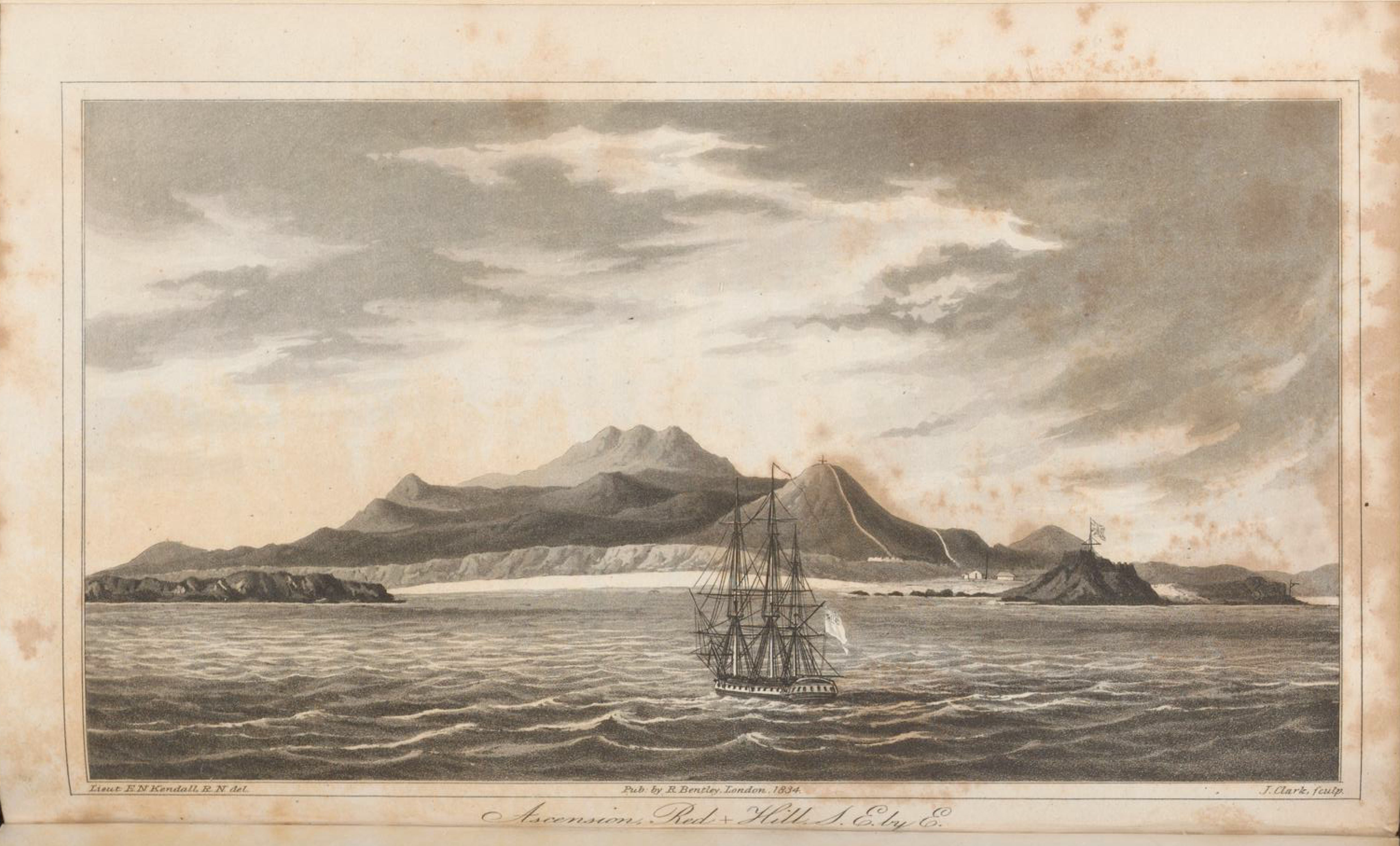
Chanticleer and Ascension Island

== Legacy and honours ==
- Port Foster in Deception Island and Mount Foster on Smith Island are named after him. Also a middle school in Longview, Texas was named after him.
