= Neptune's Bellows =

Oceanic channel in Antarctica

Coordinates: 63°0′S 60°34′W

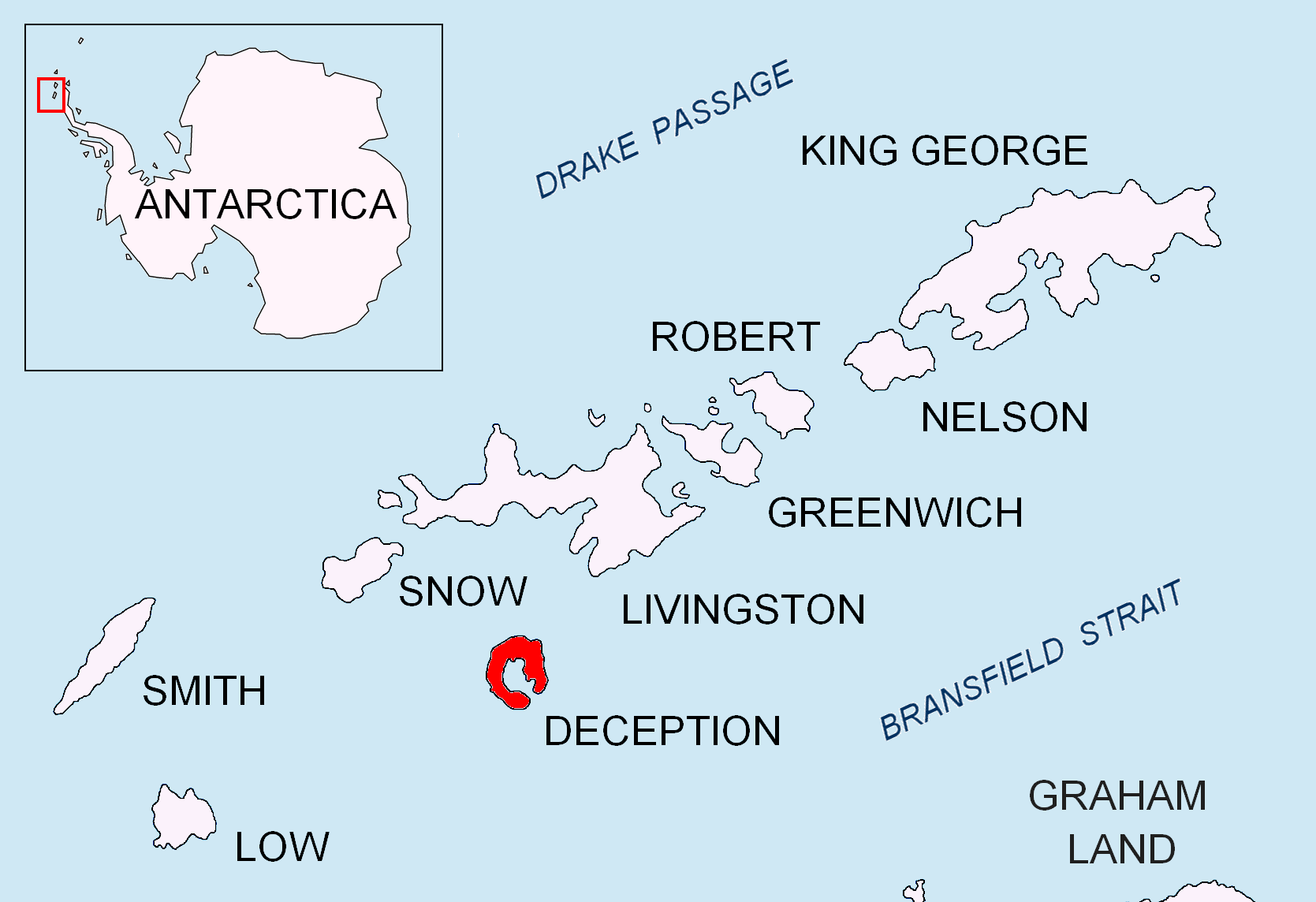
Location of Deception Island in the South Shetland Islands.

Deception Island map with topography and location of stations and protected zones

Neptune's Bellows is a channel on the southeast side of Deception Island forming the entrance to Port Foster, in the South Shetland Islands. The name, after the Roman sea god Neptune, was appended by American sealers prior to 1822 because of the strong gusts experienced in this narrow channel.

Named for "the gusts that blow in and out as if they came from a trumpet or funnell (sic)."

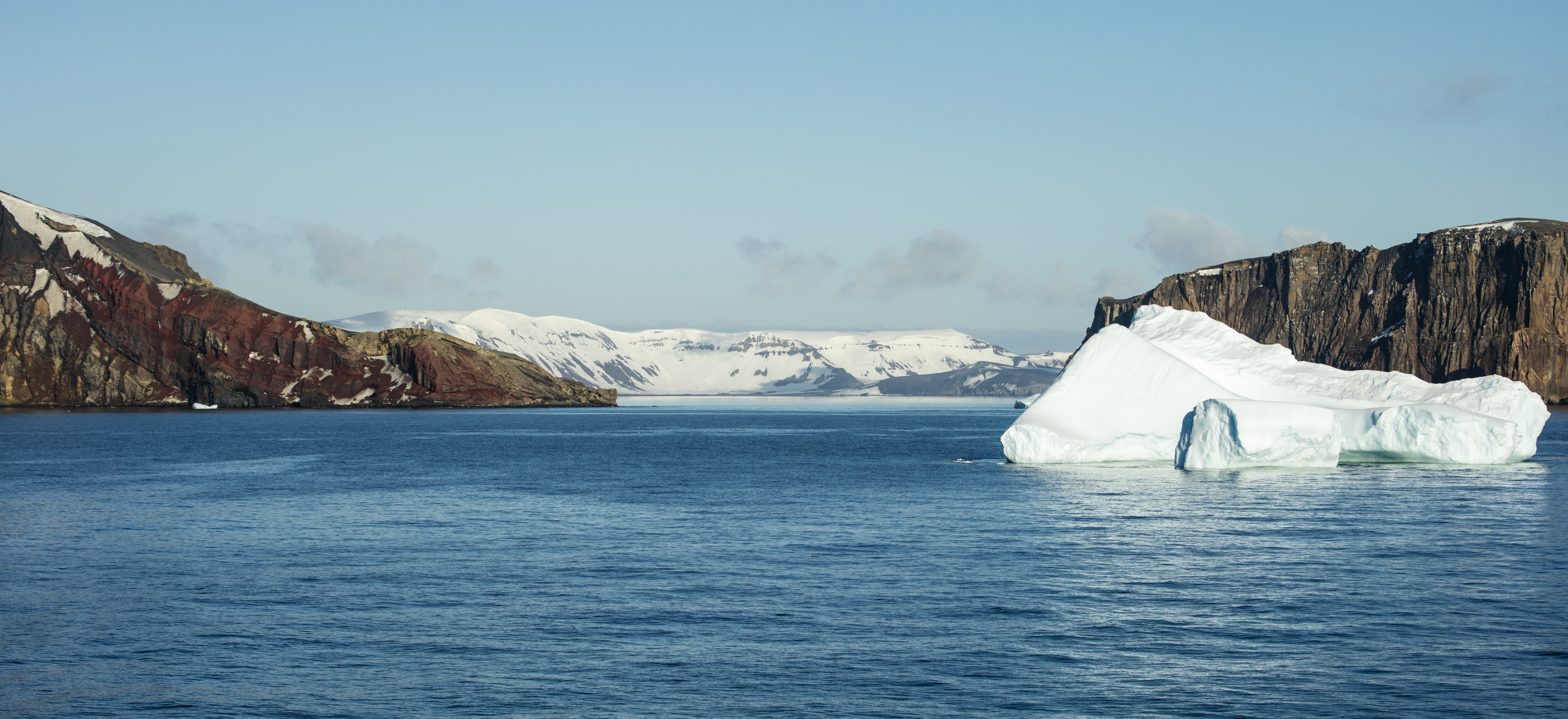
Deception Island: Neptune’s Bellows (2016)
