= Deception Island =

Active volcanic island in the South Shetland archipelago

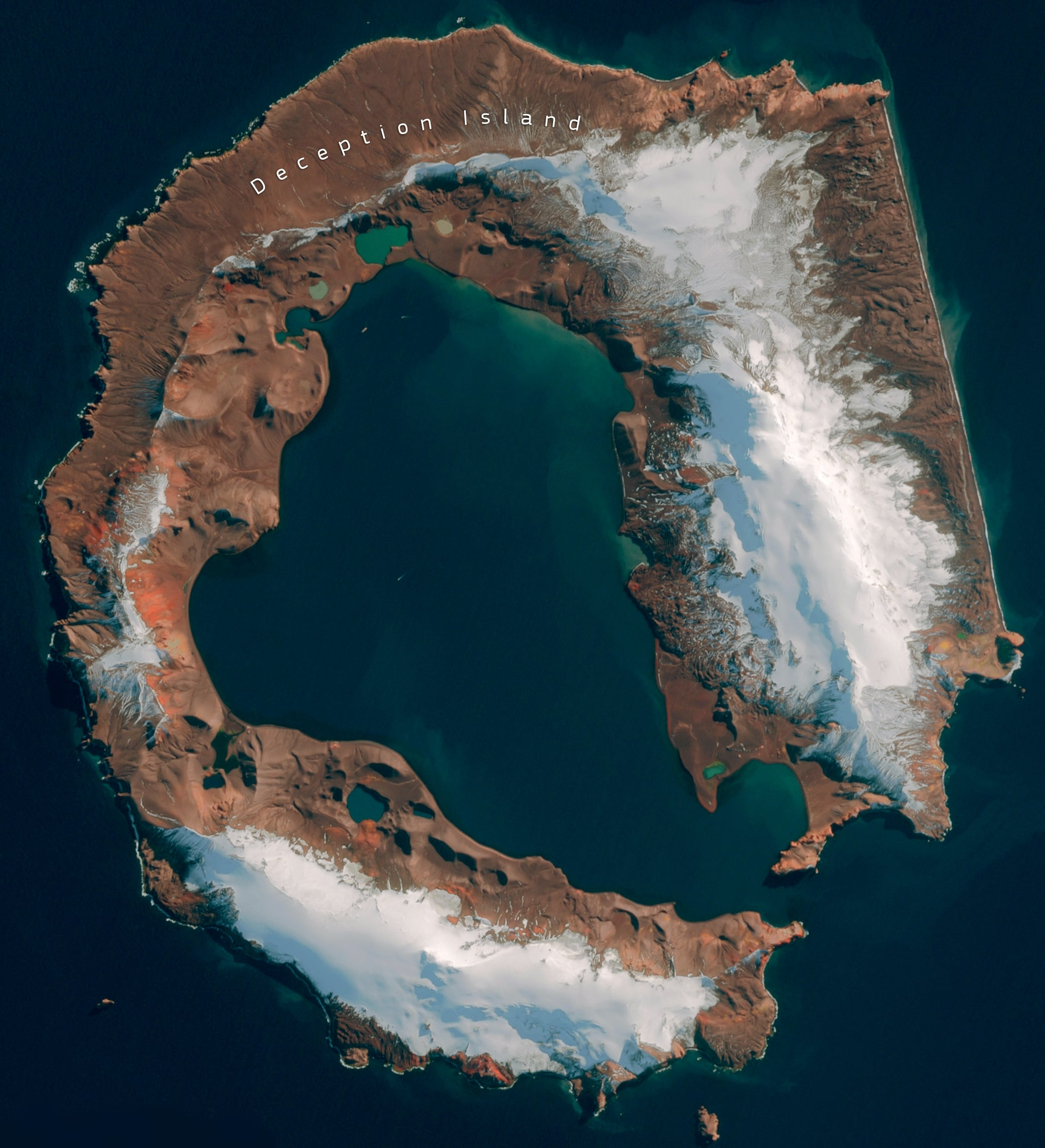
- Satellite image of the island by Sentinel-2 (March 2023)

- Location within South Shetland Islands Location within Antarctica

Geography
- Location: Antarctica
- Coordinates: 62°57′30″S 60°38′30″W
- Archipelago: South Shetland Islands
- Area: 79 km^{2} (31 sq mi)
- Length: 12 km (7.5 mi)
- Width: 12 km (7.5 mi)
- Highest elevation: 542 m (1778 ft)
- Highest point: Mount Pond

Administration
- Administered under the Antarctic Treaty System

Demographics
- Population: 0
- Surgidero Iquique Lighthouse
- Construction: concrete (foundation), fiberglass (tower)
- Height: 4.5 m (15 ft)
- Shape: cylinder
- Markings: Stripe (white, orange, horizontal orientation)
- Power source: solar power
- Focal height: 114 m (374 ft)
- Range: 5 nmi (9.3 km; 5.8 mi)
- Characteristic: Fl W 5s

Deception Island map with the topography and the location of the stations and protected zones

Deception Island is in the South Shetland Islands close to the Antarctic Peninsula with a large and usually "safe" natural harbour, which is occasionally affected by the underlying active volcano. This island is the caldera of an active volcano, which seriously damaged local scientific stations in 1967 and 1969. The island previously held a whaling station. It has now become a tourist destination, attracting over 15,000 visitors annually. Two research stations are operated by Argentina and Spain during the summer season. While various countries have asserted sovereignty, it is still administered under the Antarctic Treaty System, meaning it is under no control.

== Geography ==
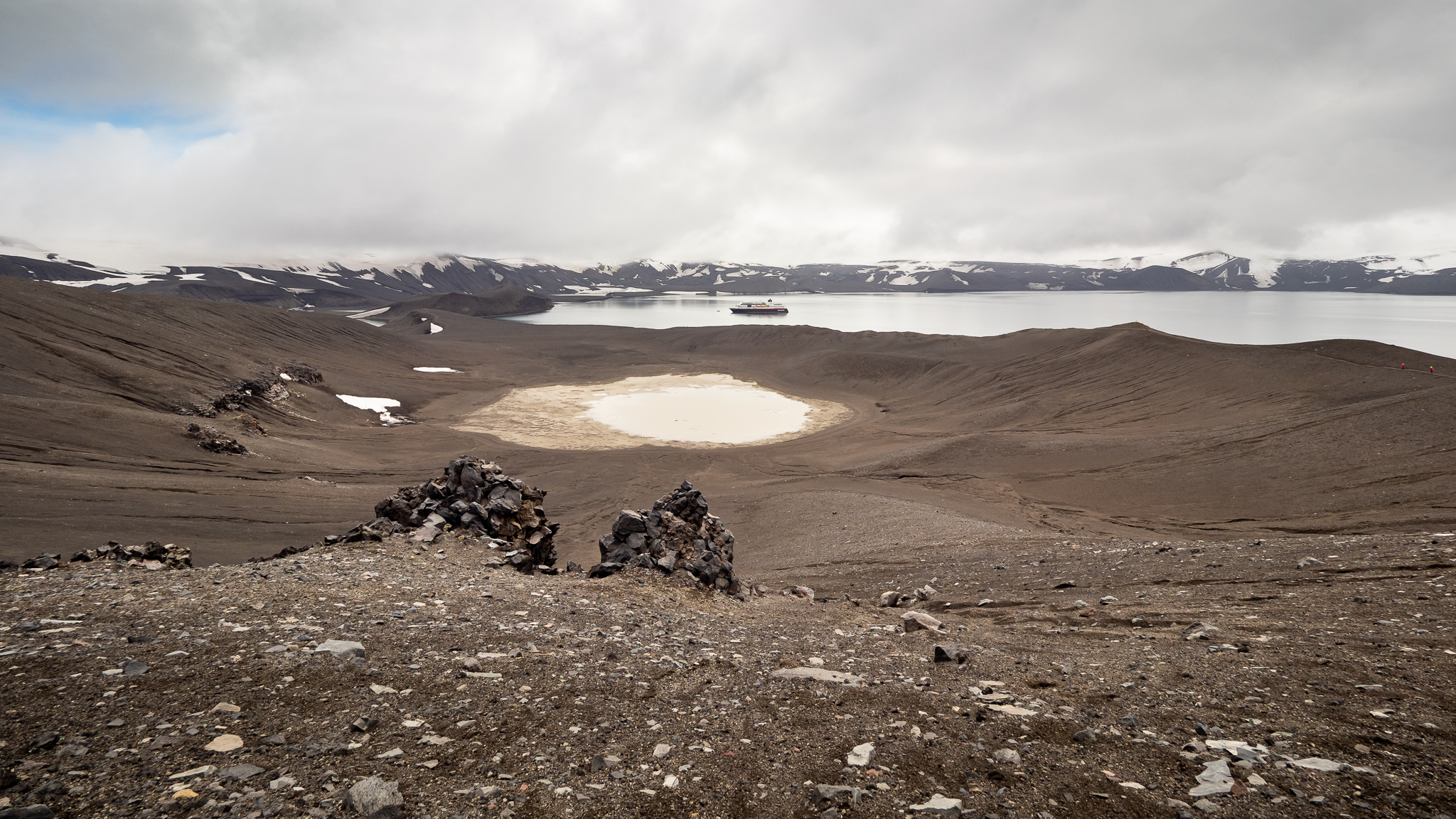
Telefon Bay

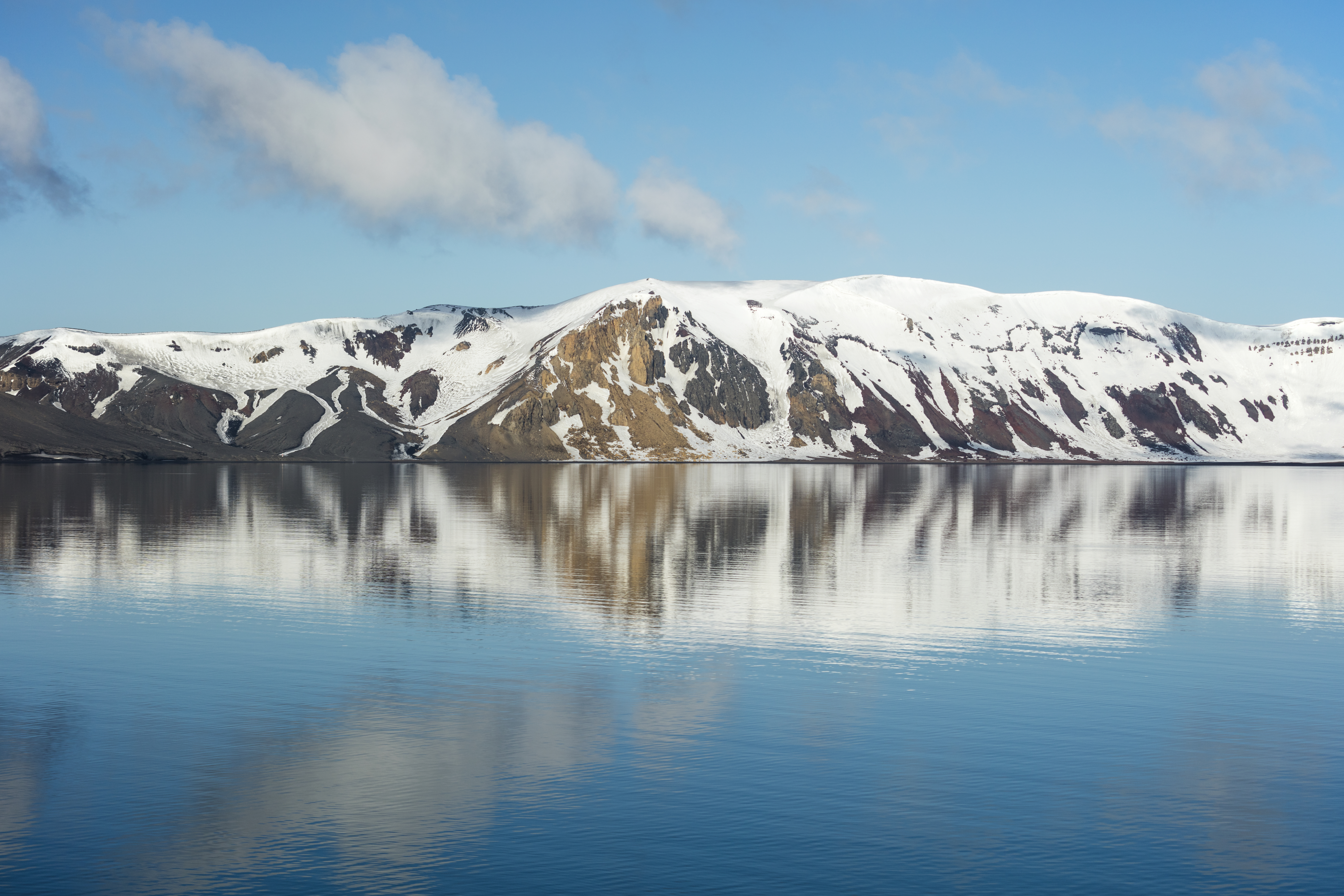
Looking WSW from the center of the caldera

Located within the Bransfield Strait, the island is roughly circular and horseshoe-shaped, with a maximum diameter around 15 km (9.3 mi). The highest peak, Mount Pond on the east side of the island, has an elevation of 539 m (1,768 ft), while Mount Kirkwood on the west has an elevation of 452 m (1,483 ft). Over half (57%) of the island is covered by glaciers up to 10 m thick, ice-cored moraines, or ice-covered pyroclasts. The sea has flooded the centre of the island to form a large bay, now called Port Foster, about 10 km (6.2 mi) long and 7 km (4.3 mi) wide. The bay has a narrow entrance, just 500 m (1,640 ft) wide, called Neptune's Bellows. The port is a basin with a flat floor up to 170 m (560 ft) deep with several small submarine cones and domes. The port is rimmed by a shallow coastal shelf with sandy-gravelly beaches. The outer coast of the island is characterised by 30–70 m (98–230 ft) cliffs of rock or ice.

Ravn Rock, a navigation hazard, lies 2.5 m (8.2 ft) below the water in the middle of the channel. Just inside Neptune's Bellows lies the cove Whalers Bay, which is bordered by a large black sand beach. Several maars line the inside rim of the caldera, with some containing crater lakes (including one named Crater Lake). Others form bays within the harbour, such as the 1 km (0.6 mi) wide Whalers Bay. Other features of the island include Mount Kirkwood, Fumarole Bay, Sewing-Machine Needles, Telefon Bay, and Telefon Ridge.

The linear Costa Recta spanning most of the east coast is hypothesised to be a scarp of a retreated submarine fault.

A 2016 study on Ardley Island, 120 km (75 mi) to the northeast, examined lake guano sediments and studied penguin population dynamics over 7,000 years. Three of five population growth phases were terminated by a sudden crash, due to volcanic eruptions from the active volcano of Deception Island. The history of volcanic eruptions is still under investigation, but several large eruptions have occurred in the last 10,000 years.

== Geology ==
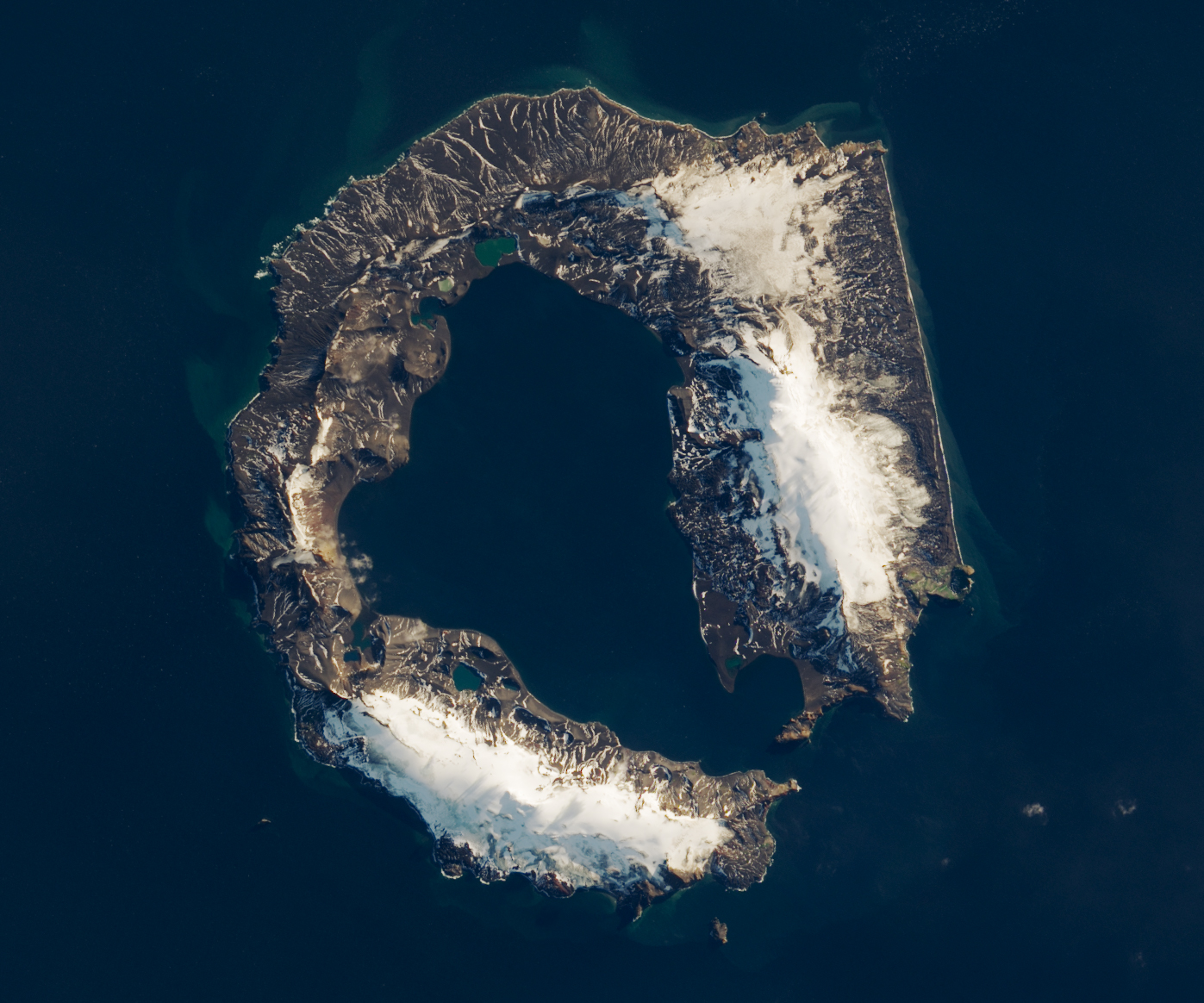
Landsat 8 satellite photograph taken on 23 March 2018

Deception Island is the exposed portion of an active shield volcano 30 km in diameter. The island is associated with Bransfield Basin seafloor spreading that includes a volcanic ridge and seamounts dating back to the Pleistocene. Deception Island volcanic ash layers have been found on other South Shetland Islands, the Bransfield Strait, the Scotia Sea and in South Pole ice cores. Volcanic tremors are common, originating from depths less than 10 km. Historical eruptions occurred in 1839–1842, 1967, 1969, and 1970.

Stratigraphy of the island is characterised by the pre-caldera Port Foster Group and the post-caldera Mount Pond Group, both within the Deception Island Volcanic Complex. The Port Foster Group's principal outcrops are located at South Point, Cathedral Crags near Entrance Point and north of Punta de la Descubierta, forming spectacular coastal cliffs along the western portion of the island. The group is composed of the Fumarole Bay Formation consisting of hydrovolcanic tephra, the Basaltic Shield Formation consisting of lavas and Strombolian scoria, and the Outer Coast Tuff Formation consisting of lapilli-tuffs. The Mount Pond Group dominates the surface geology and consists of the pyroclastic Baily Head and Pendulum Cove formations, both formed during hydrovolcanic eruptions, and the Stonethrow Ridge Formation, consisting of tuff cone and maar deposits.

The caldera collapsed as either a hydrovolcanic eruption of the Outer Coast Tuff Formation, releasing about 30 cubic kilometers of magma, or passively due to regional tectonics, since the island is at the intersection of the Bransfield Strait rift and the orthogonal Hero fracture zone.

== History ==
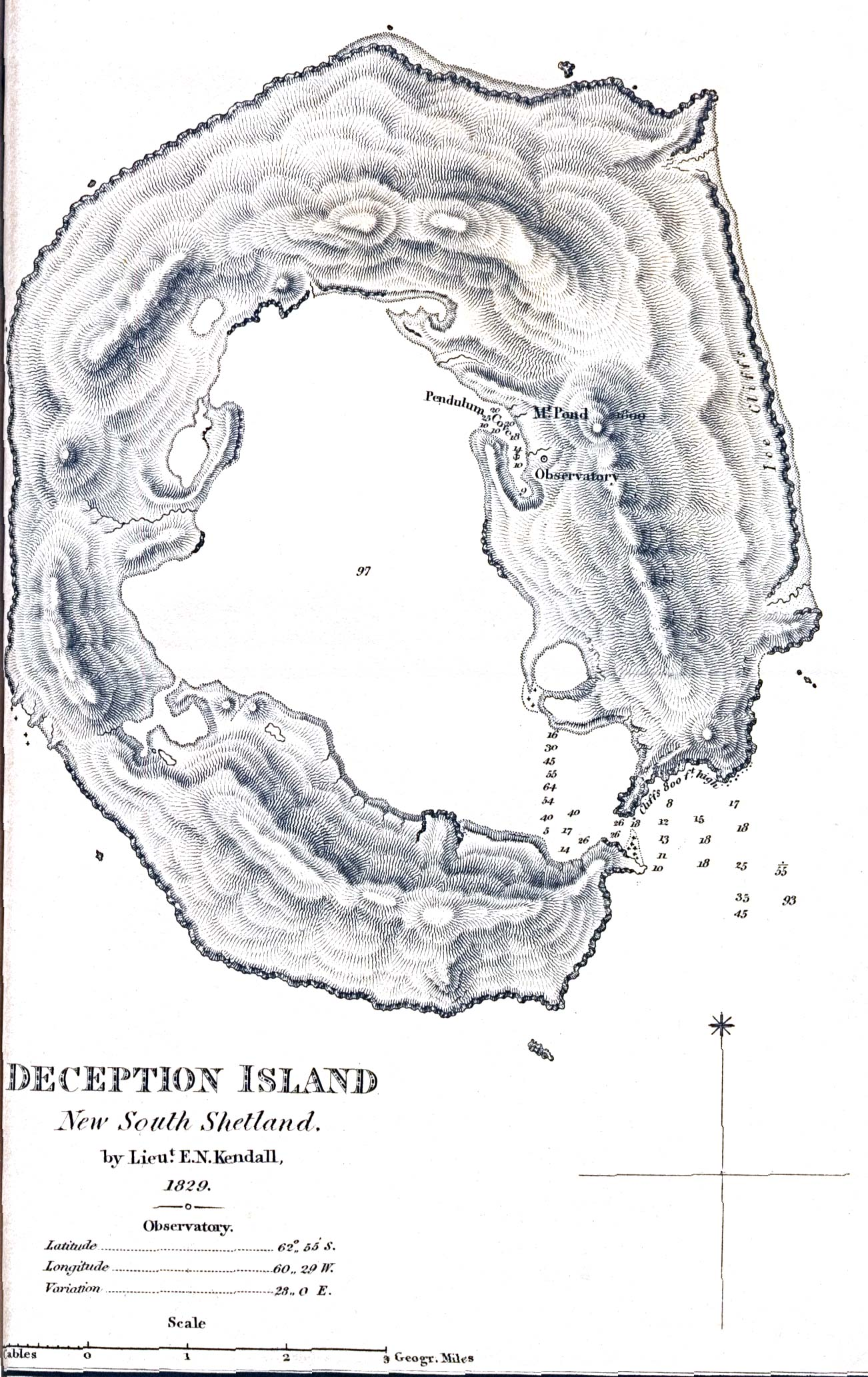
1829 map

The first authenticated sighting of Deception Island was by the British sealers William Smith and Edward Bransfield from the brig Williams in January 1820. It was first visited and explored by the American sealer Nathaniel Palmer on the sloop Hero the following summer, on 15 November 1820. He remained for two days, exploring the central bay. Palmer named it "Deception Island" on account of its outward deceptive appearance as a normal island, when the narrow entrance of Neptune's Bellows revealed it rather to be a ring around a flooded caldera.

Palmer was part of an American sealing fleet from Stonington, Connecticut, under the command of Benjamin Pendleton, consisting of 6 ships. Port Fisher was used as their operational base from 1820 to 1821. Palmer met Bellingshausen close to the island in Jan. 1821, during the First Russian Antarctic Expedition.

A lighthouse named Surgidero Iquique was built on the island to guide vessels into Deception Station.

=== Whaling and sealing ===
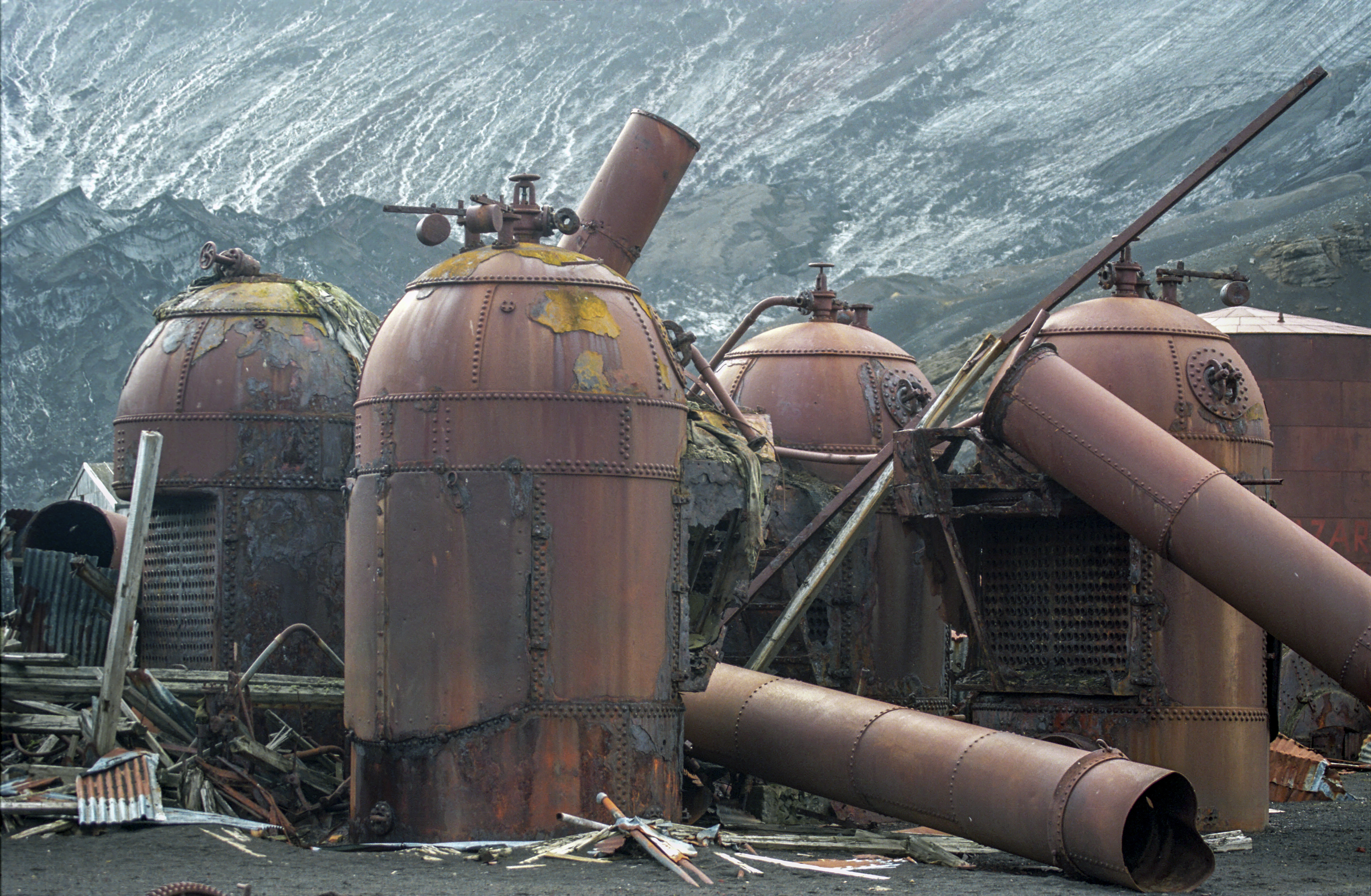
Remains of the whaling station's boilers

Over the next few years, Deception became a focal point of the short-lived fur-sealing industry in the South Shetlands. The industry began with a handful of ships in the 1819–1820 summer season, rising to nearly a hundred in 1821–1822. While the island did not have a large seal population, it was a perfect natural harbour, mostly free from ice and winds, and a convenient rendezvous point. Some men likely lived ashore in tents or shacks for short periods during the summer, though no archaeological or documentary evidence survives to confirm this. Massive overhunting meant that the fur seals neared extinction in the South Shetlands within a few years, and the sealing industry collapsed as quickly as it had begun. Deception was abandoned again in approximately 1825.

Sealing captain Robert Fildes charted Port Foster in 1820–1821, which in 1829 became the first published Antarctica nautical chart.

In 1829, the British Naval Expedition to the South Atlantic under the command of Captain Henry Foster in HMS Chanticleer stopped at Deception. The expedition conducted a topographic survey and scientific experiments, particularly pendulum and magnetic observations. A watercolour made by Lieutenant Kendall of the Chanticleer during the visit may be the first image made of the island. A subsequent visit by the American elephant-sealer Ohio in 1842 reported the first recorded volcanic activity, with the southern shore "in flames".

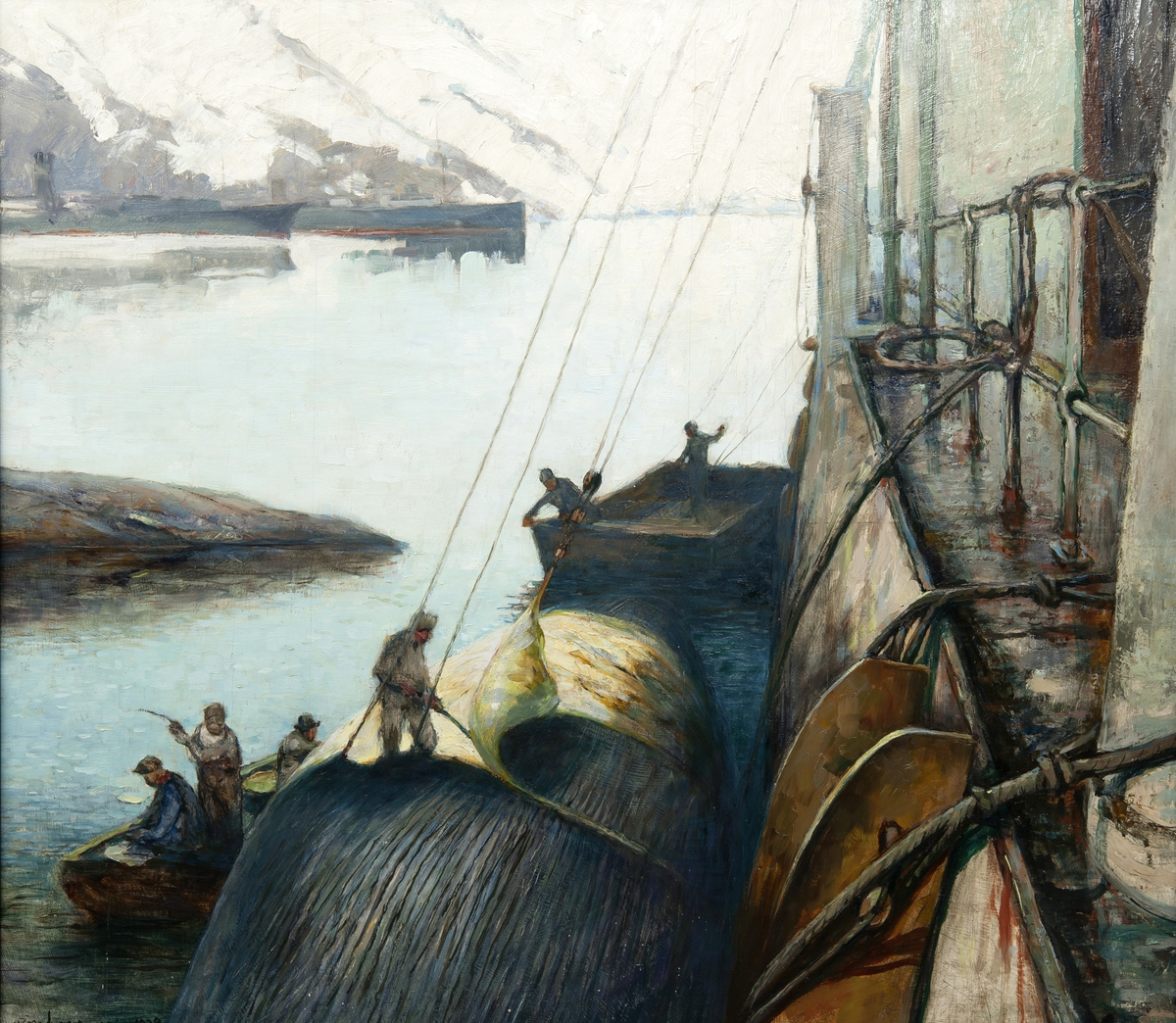
Flensing at Whalers Bay, Deception Island. By 1912–1913, the island had 12 factory ships, and 27 catchers, occupying 200 people, with 3,000 rotting whale carcasses in the Whalers Bay area.

The second phase of human activity at Deception began in the early 20th century. In 1904, an active whaling industry was established at South Georgia, taking advantage of new technology and an almost untouched population of whales to make rapid profits. It spread south into the South Shetland Islands, where the lack of shore-based infrastructure meant that the whales had to be towed to moored factory ships for processing; these needed a sheltered anchorage and a plentiful supply of fresh water, both of which could be found at Deception. In 1906, the Norwegian-Chile whaling company Sociedad Ballenera de Magallanes started using Whalers Bay as a base for a single ship, the Gobernador Bories.

Other whalers followed, with several hundred men resident at Deception during the Antarctic summers and as many as 13 ships operating in peak years. In 1908, the British government formally declared the island to be part of the Falkland Islands Dependencies, thus under British control, establishing postal services and appointing a magistrate and customs officer for the island. The magistrate was to ensure that whaling companies were paying appropriate licence fees to the Falklands government and ensuring adherence to catch quotas. A cemetery was built in 1908, a radio station in 1912, a hand-operated railway also in 1912, and a small permanent magistrate's house in 1914. The cemetery, by far the largest in Antarctica, held graves for 35 men along with a memorial to 10 more presumed drowned.

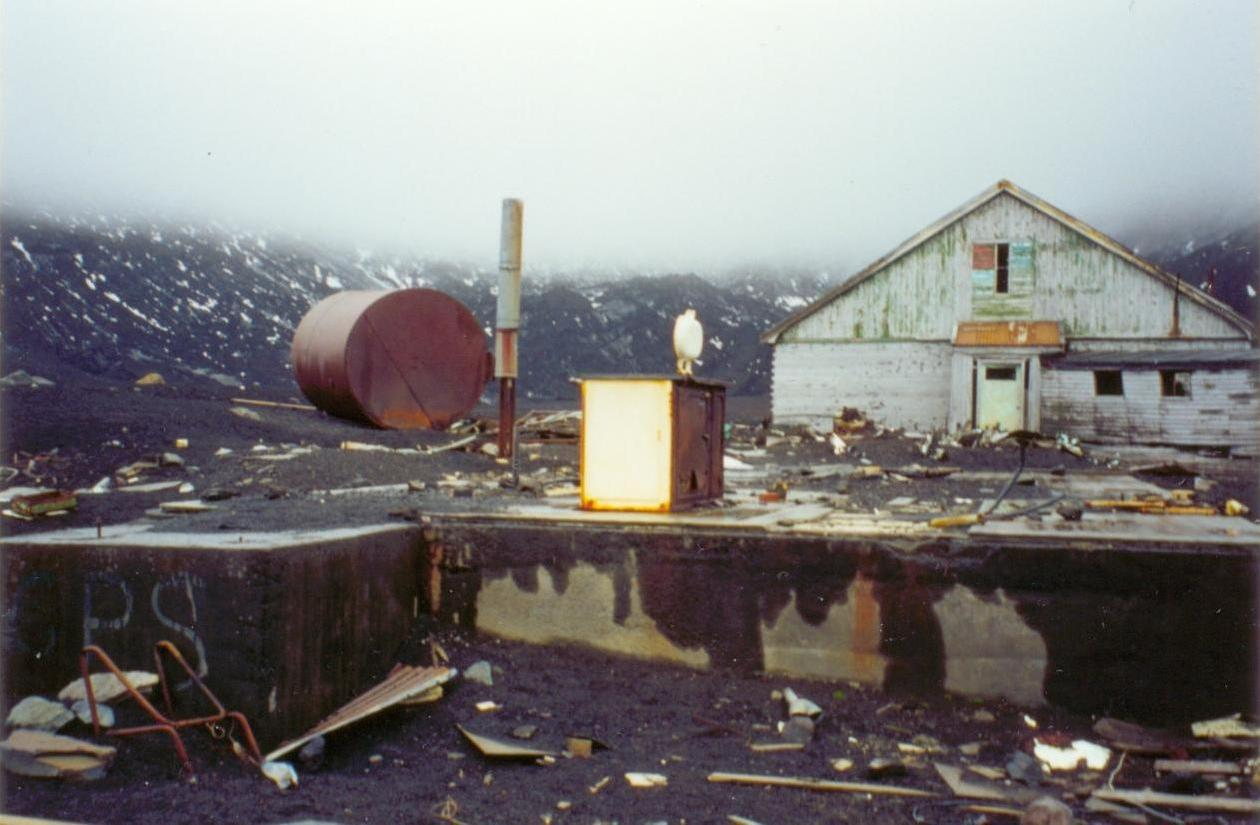
The destroyed British base

These were not the only constructions; as the factory ships of the period were only able to strip the blubber from whales and could not use the carcasses, a permanent on-shore station was established by the Norwegian company Hvalfangerselskabet Hektor A/S in 1912 – to an estimated 40% of the available oil was being wasted by the ship-based system. This was the only successful shore-based industry ever to operate in Antarctica, reaping high profits in its first years.

The development of pelagic whaling in the 1920s, where factory ships fitted with a slipway could tow aboard entire whales for processing, meant that whaling companies were no longer tied to sheltered anchorages. A boom in pelagic Antarctic whaling followed, with companies now free to ignore quotas and escape the costs of licences. This rapidly led to overproduction of oil and a collapse in the market, and the less profitable and more heavily regulated shore-based companies had trouble competing. In early 1931, the Hektor factory finally ceased operation, ending commercial whaling at the island entirely.

=== Scientific research ===
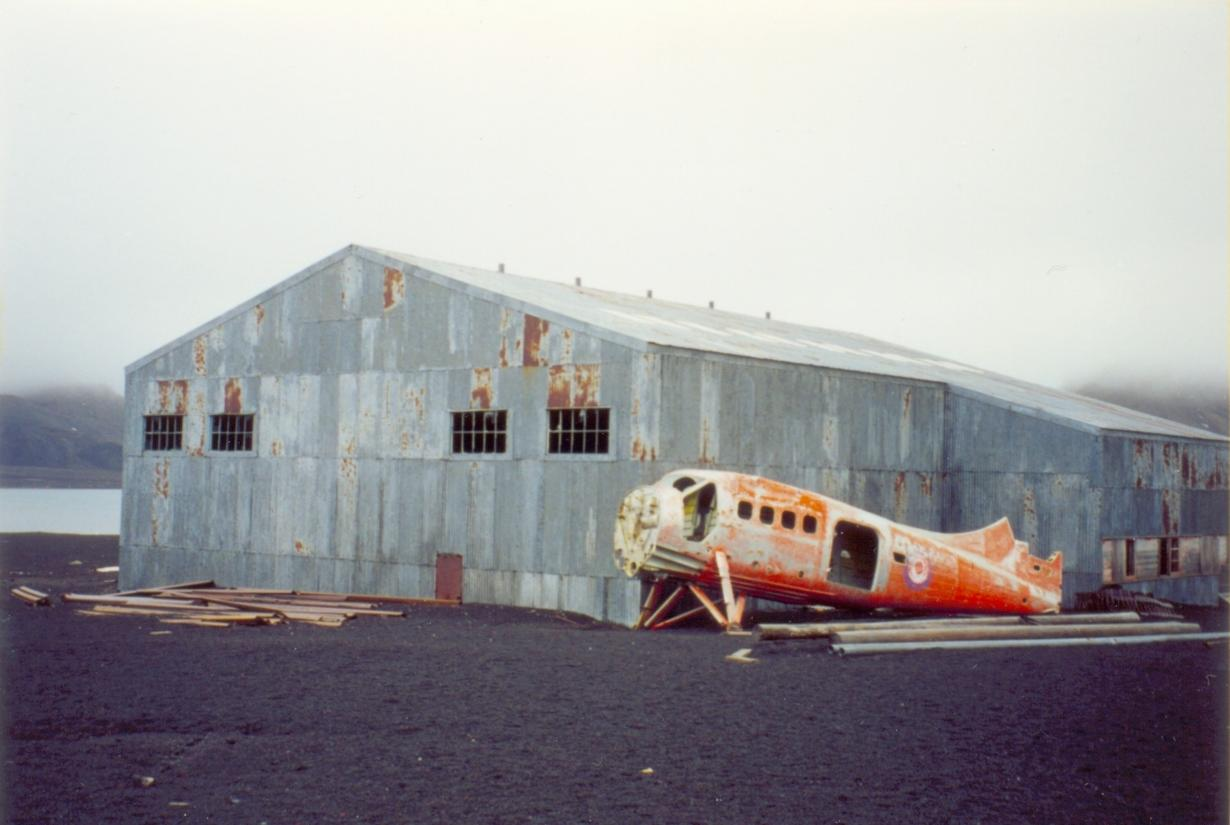
The derelict hangar

Several exploring expeditions visited Deception during the peak years of whaling, including the Wilkins-Hearst expedition of 1928, when, on 16 November 1928 a Lockheed Vega was flown by Hubert Wilkins from a beach airstrip on the first successful flights in Antarctica.

Deception remained uninhabited for a decade, but was revisited in 1941 by the British auxiliary warship HMS Queen of Bermuda, which destroyed the oil tanks and some remaining supplies to ensure it could not be used as a German supply base. In 1942, an Argentine party aboard the Primero de Mayo visited and left signs and painted flags declaring the site Argentine territory; the following year, a British party with HMS Carnarvon Castle returned to remove the signs.

In 1944, a British expedition under Lieutenant James Marr established a short-lived base on Deception Island as part of Operation Tabarin, which was carried out during the Second World War to deny safe anchorages to enemy raiding vessels and to gather meteorological data for allied shipping in the South Atlantic. It also had the effect of strengthening British claims to the Falkland Island Dependencies that had begun being challenged by Argentina and Chile. Operation Tabarin would deny use of the area to the Kriegsmarine, which was known to use remote islands as rendezvous points, and address a fear that Japan might attempt to seize the Falkland Islands. Following the end of the war, the research begun by Operation Tabarin continued in subsequent years, ultimately becoming the British Antarctic Survey.

In February 1953, as part of a post-war British effort to exert sovereignty over its claimed Antarctic territories, HMS Snipe (U20) landed a party of Royal Marines on Deception Island to destroy an Argentinian and a Chilean military base; an action known as the Deception Island incident.

In 1960, Prof. Millett G. Morgan of Dartmouth College conducted an ambitious experiment analogous to controlled seismic tests in geology. But rather than creating waves in the Earth's crust, he sought to generate very-low-frequency (VLF) electromagnetic waves that would travel high up along the Earth's magnetic field lines and come back down at a “conjugate” point in Eastern Canada. By treating the semi-circular island as a natural “slot antenna,” in the conducting ocean Morgan and colleagues from the Falkland Island Dependency Survey measured properties to see if it might serve as a transmitting antenna that would allow them to explore properties of the magnetosphere. Because they found there are “leaks” through the rocks of the island, it was never used to transmit VLF waves, but it did operate as a very effective receiving antenna. Today there is a small exhibit on the island that describes this experiment.

In 1961, Argentina's president Arturo Frondizi visited the island to show his country's interest. Regular visits were made by other countries operating in the Antarctic, including the 1964 visit of the US Coast Guard icebreaker Eastwind, which ran aground inside the harbour.

However, the volcano returned to activity in 1967 and 1969, destroying the existing scientific stations. Both British and Chilean stations were demolished, and the island was again abandoned for several years. The final major volcanic eruption was reported by the Russian Bellingshausen station on King George Island and the Chilean station Arturo Prat on Greenwich Island; both stations experienced major falls of ash on 13 August 1970.

In 2000, there were two summer-only scientific stations, the Spanish Gabriel de Castilla Base and the Argentine Decepción Station.

Remains of previous structures at Whalers Bay include rusting boilers and tanks, an aircraft hangar, and the British scientific station house (Biscoe House), with the middle torn out by the 1969 mudflows. A bright orange derelict airplane fuselage, which is that of a de Havilland Canada DHC-3 Otter that belonged to the Royal Air Force, was recovered in 2004. Plans to restore the airplane and return it to the island have been made.

The Russian cruise ship MV Lyubov Orlova ran aground at Deception Island on 27 November 2006. She was towed off by the Spanish Navy icebreaker Las Palmas and made her own way to Ushuaia, Tierra del Fuego. She later became a ghost ship in the North Atlantic after the towing line parted during an operation to scrap the vessel in the Dominican Republic.

== Tourism ==
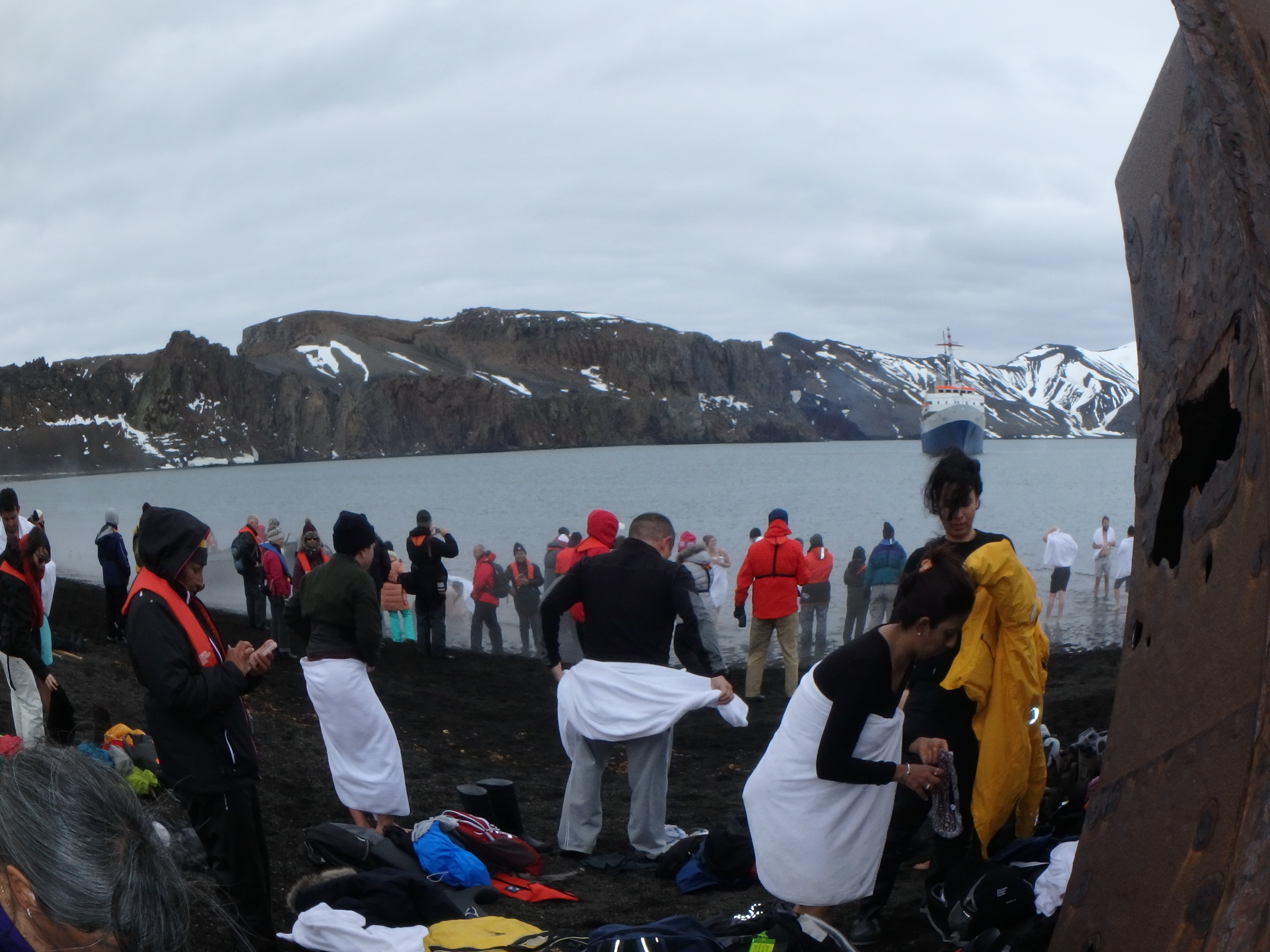
Tourists Preparing to Swim in the Ocean at Deception Island, South Shetlands

The first commercial cruise ship arrived in January 1966. By 1999, over 10,000 tourists had visited the island.

== Research stations ==
=== Aguirre Cerda ===
President Pedro Aguirre Cerda Station was a Chilean Antarctic base, located at Pendulum Cove on Deception Island in the South Shetland Islands, inaugurated in 1955. It was evacuated in December 1967 when volcanic eruptions forced the evacuation of the base.

=== Deception ===
Deception Station is an Argentine base located at Deception Island. The station was founded on 25 January 1948 and was a year-round station until December 1967, when volcanic eruptions forced the evacuation of the base. Since then, it has been inhabited only during the summer.

=== Gabriel de Castilla ===
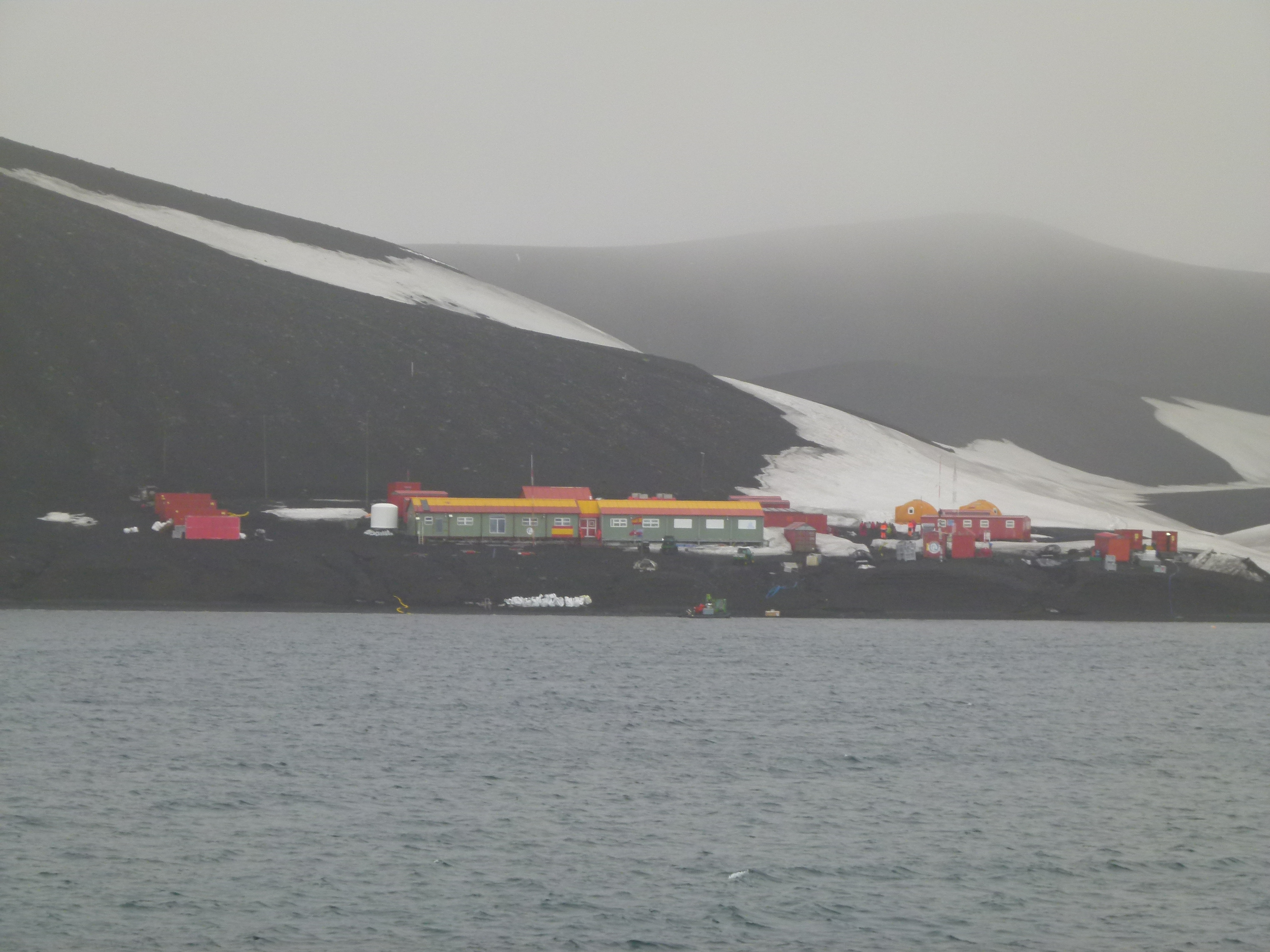
The Spanish Gabriel de Castilla Base

Gabriel de Castilla Base is a Spanish research station located on Deception Island. The station was constructed in 1990.

=== Gutiérrez Vargas Refuge ===
The Gutiérrez Vargas Refuge, named after an aviation captain who died on 30 December 1955, was located at 1 km (0.62 mi) from Aguirre Cerda Station and was inaugurated on 12 February 1956. Its purpose was to serve as a refuge for the members of the station in case of fire. On 4 December 1967 the refuge was definitively abandoned, as was the Aguirre Cerda Station, due to a violent volcanic eruption. The remains of the refuge structure can still be seen on the beach where it was located.

=== Station B ===
Station B
- Antarctic research station
- Interactive map of Station B
- Coordinates: 62°58′38″S 60°33′50″W
- Established: 1944
- Abandoned: 23 February 1969

Government
  - Type: Administration
  - Body: FIDASE, United Kingdom
- Active times: All year-round

In early 1944, a party of men from Operation Tabarin, a British expedition, established a permanent scientific base named Station B. This was occupied until 5 December 1967, when an eruption forced a temporary withdrawal. It was used again between 4 December 1968 and 23 February 1969, when further volcanic activity caused it to be abandoned.

== Environment ==
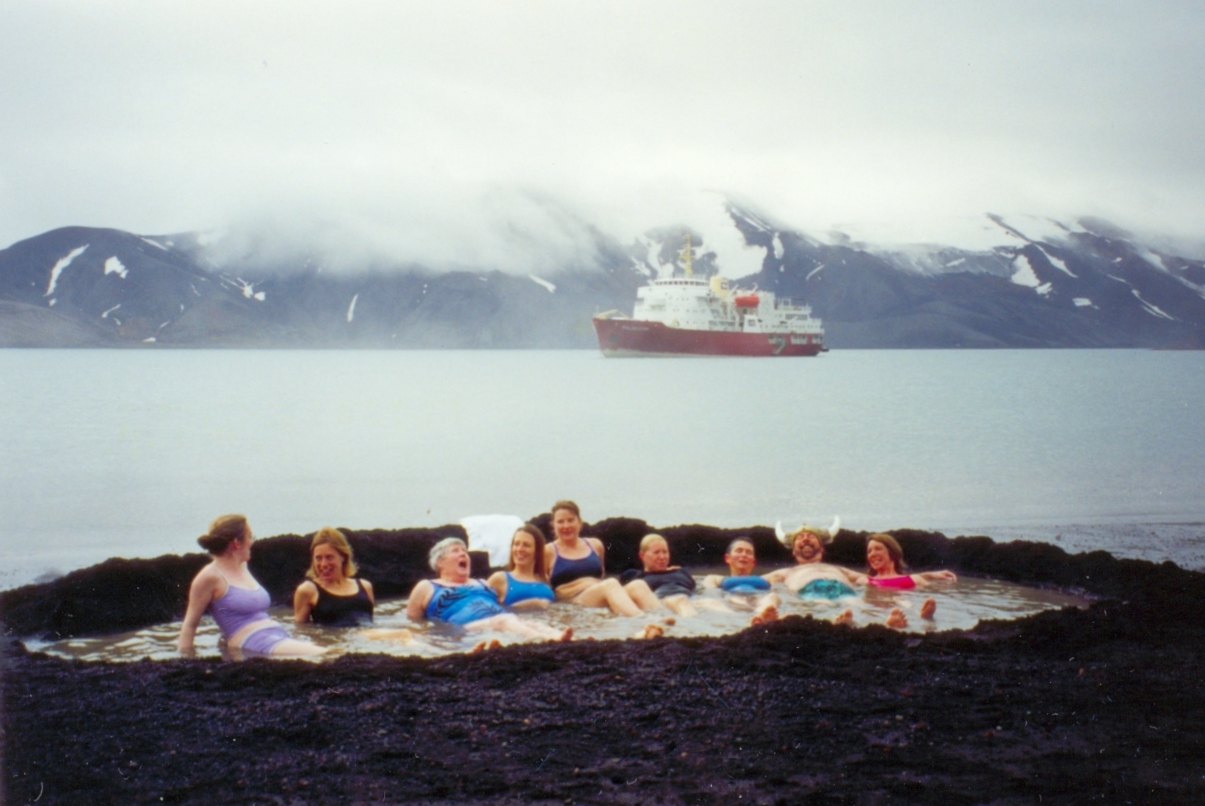
Hot spring at Port Foster, with the MS Explorer in the background

Deception Island has become a popular tourist stop in Antarctica because of its several colonies of chinstrap penguins, as well as the possibility of making a warm bath by digging into the sands of the beach.

After the Norwegian Coastal Cruise Liner MS Nordkapp ran aground off the coast of Deception Island on 30 January 2007, fuel from the ship washed into a bay. Ecological damage has not yet been determined. On 4 February 2007, the Spanish Gabriel de Castilla research station on Deception Island reported that water and sand tests were clean, and that they had not found signs of the oil, estimated as 500 to 750 L of light diesel (130 to 200 US gal; 110 to 160 imp gal).

In 2026 researchers from the University of Cádiz reported a microplastics contamination in the beaches of the island.

=== Antarctic specially protected areas ===
Eleven terrestrial sites have been collectively designated as an Antarctic specially protected area (ASPA 140), primarily for their botanic and ecological values, because the island has the greatest number of rare plant species of any place in the Antarctic. This is largely due to frequent volcanic activity creating new substrates for plant colonisation:

- Collins Point (site A) contains good examples of long-established vegetation, with high species diversity and several rarities.
- Crater Lake (site B) has a scoria-covered lava tongue with a diverse cryptogamic flora, and exceptional development of turf-forming mosses.
- An unnamed hill at the southern end of Fumarole Bay (site C) has several rare species of mosses that have colonised the heated soil crust close to a line of volcanic vents.
- Fumarole Bay (site D) is geologically complex with the most diverse flora on the island.
- West Stonethrow Ridge (site E) supports several rare mosses, liverworts, and lichens.
- Telefon Bay (site F) has all its surfaces dating from 1967, thus allowing accurate monitoring of colonisation by plants and animals.
- Pendulum Cove (site G) is another known-age site being colonised by mosses and lichens.
- Mount Pond (site H) contains exceptional moss, liverwort, and lichen communities.
- Perchue Cone (site J) is an ash and cinder cone with rare mosses.
- Ronald Hill to Kroner Lake (site K) is another known-age site being colonised by numerous cryptogam species, and with a unique algal community on the lake shore.
- South East Point (site L) supports the most extensive population of Antarctic pearlwort known in the Antarctic region.

In addition, two marine sites in Port Foster have collectively been designated ASPA 145, to protect their benthic communities.

=== Important bird area ===
Baily Head, a prominent headland forming the easternmost extremity of the island, has been identified as an important bird area (IBA) by BirdLife International because it supports a very large breeding colony of chinstrap penguins (100,000 pairs). The 78 ha (190-acre) IBA comprises the ice-free headland and about 800 metres (0.50 mi) of beach on either side of it. Other birds known to nest at the site include brown skuas, Cape petrels, and snowy sheathbills.

Other birdlife commonly seen at Deception island include Wilson's storm petrels, black-bellied storm petrels and kelp gulls. South polar skuas and Antarctic terns are also known to breed on the caldera shores and cliffs.

== See also ==
- Bynon Hill
- Cathedral Crags
- List of Antarctic islands south of 60° S
- List of volcanoes in Antarctica
- List of lighthouses in Antarctica
- List of Antarctic research stations
- List of Antarctic field camps
- Stancomb Cove
- Stanley Patch
- Wensleydale Beacon
- Crime in Antarctica
