= Port Foster =

Specially protected bay in Antarctica

Coordinates: 62°58′37″S 60°39′0″W

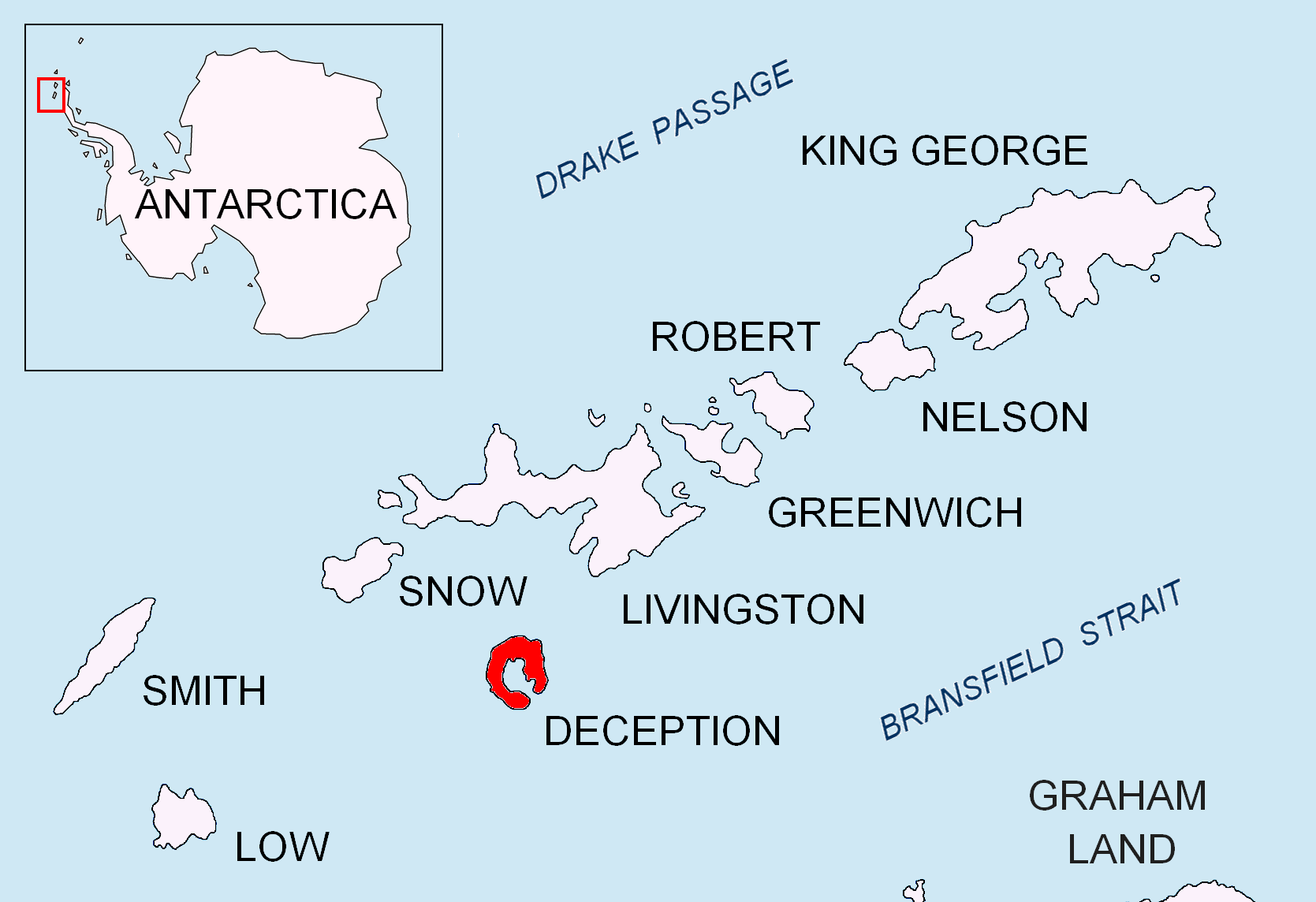
Location of Deception Island in the South Shetland Islands

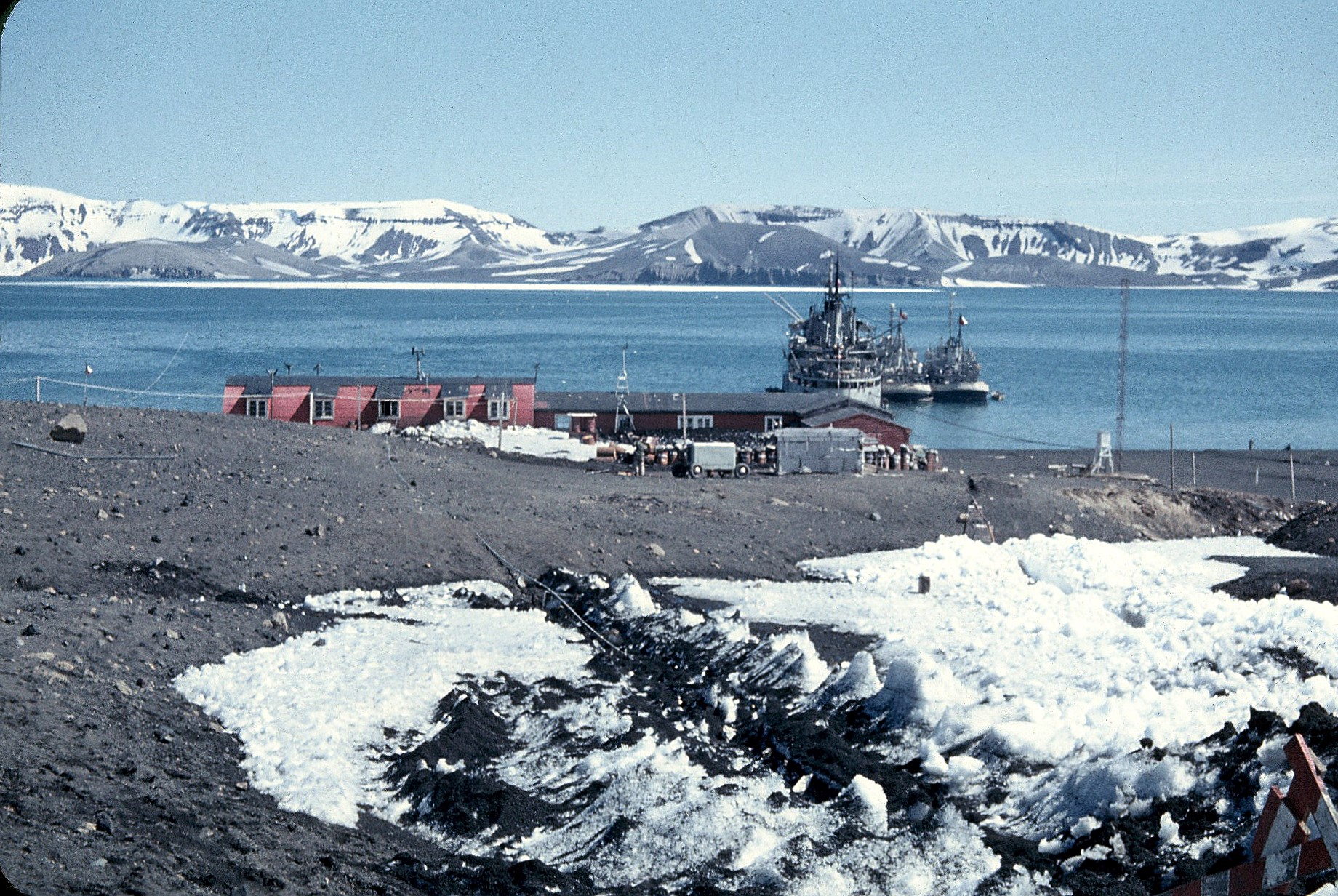
Port Foster in 1958

Port Foster is one of the safest harbours in Antarctica, located in Deception Island in the South Shetland Islands.

== History ==
The harbour was known to sealers as early as 1820, and in its early history was called Port Williams, after Captain William Smith's brig, Williams; or Yankee Harbor, because of the number of American sealers who harboured there.

The port, briefly called Yankee Harbour and Port Dunbar, was named Port Foster after Henry Foster, captain of HMS Chanticleer and leader of the first scientific expedition to the island in January – March 1829. The expedition, based in Pendulum Cove, made gravitational and magnetic measurements, produced the first topographic map, made temperature measurements, and made a hydrographic survey.

Former names for the port have remained for other features in the same archipelago — Williams Point and Yankee Harbor.

== Description ==
Deception Island map with topography and location of stations and protected zones. The harbour entrance named Neptune's Bellows is at bottom right.

The centre of Deception Island is a caldera, formed by a gigantic volcanic eruption and later flooded. This has created the 10 by 7 km (6.2 by 4.3 mi) basin-like harbour of Port Foster. The entrance to Port Foster is only 560 m (1,840 ft) wide and is named Neptune's Bellows.

The benthic zone of Port Foster is of great ecological interest due to the natural disturbance induced by the volcanic activity. Two areas have been collectively protected as Antarctic Specially Protected Area (ASPA) No.145.

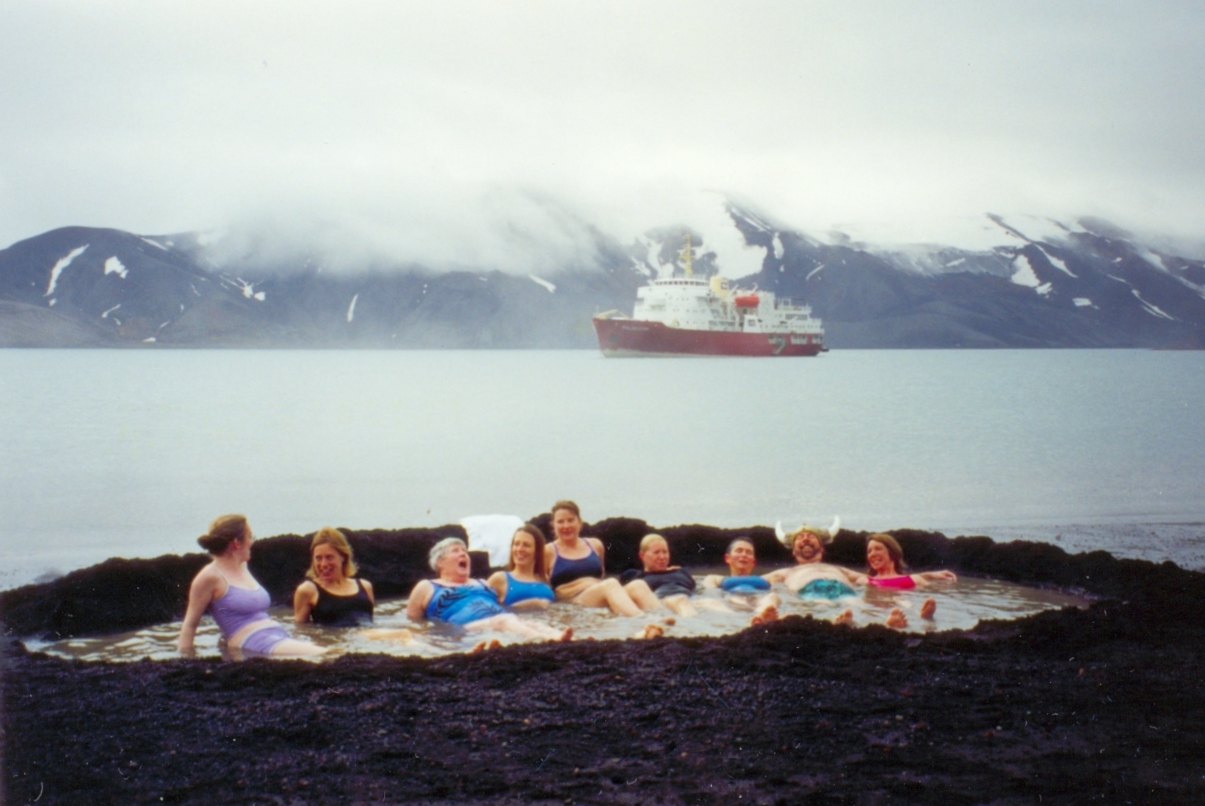
Warm volcanic bath at Port Foster. MV Explorer is in the background; she later sank after hitting an iceberg.

== See also ==
- Stancomb Cove
- Stanley Patch
- Wensleydale Beacon
