= Colonization of Antarctica =

Territorial claims in Antarctica Argentina (Argentine Antarctica) Australia (Australian Antarctic Territory) Chile (Chilean Antarctic Territory) France (Adélie Land) New Zealand (Ross Dependency) Norway (Peter I Island & Queen Maud Land) United Kingdom (British Antarctic Territory)

Colonization of Antarctica is the establishing and maintaining of control over Antarctic land for exploitation and possible settlement.

Antarctica was claimed by several states since the 16th century, culminating in a territorial competition in the first half of the 20th century when its interior was explored and the first Antarctic camps and bases were set up.

Contemporarily territorial claims and activities on Antarctica have been limited since the Antarctic Treaty (1959) by the Antarctic Treaty System and its Protocol on Environmental Protection to the Antarctic Treaty.

At present the population of Antarctica comprises scientists and staff of approximate 4,000 people in summer and 1,000 in winter, from 30 countries staying at about 70 bases (40 year-round and 30 summer-only). Of those bases, two are civilian settlements, the Argentinian-administered Esperanza Base and Chilean-administered Villa Las Estrellas.

== History ==
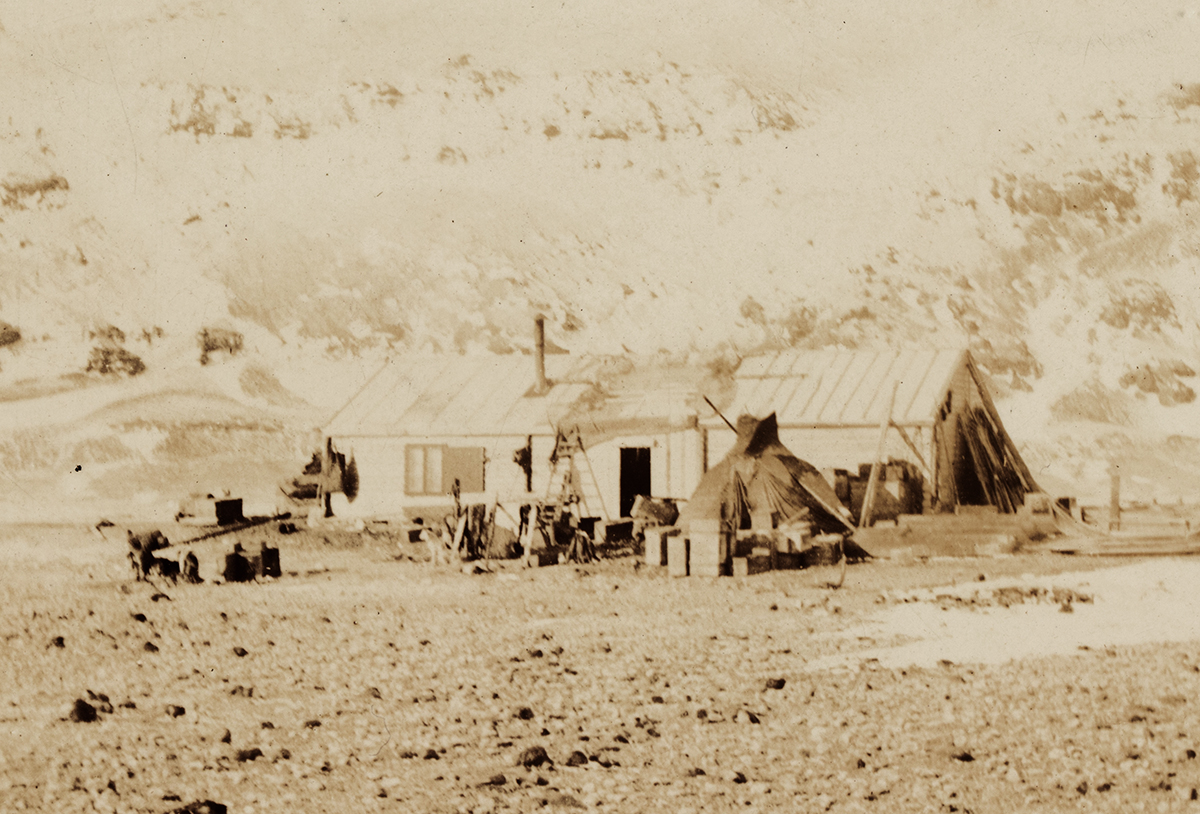
The first known dwelling on Antarctica, built by Carstens Borchgrevink's Southern Cross Expedition (1899). The hut (HSM 22) still stands and is located on Cape Adare, the cape where in 1895 Borchgrevnik participated in the first documented landing on Antarctica.

The Antarctic region has been a region of sovereign claims since at least the 16th century. The harsh Southern Ocean thwarted exploration of the region for hundreds of years, until the first half of the 19th century when sealers and explorers reported having found new southern lands. After whalers started hunting in the area polar explorers started venturing inland at the start of the 20th century, reaching the South Pole in 1911, European and American states increasingly made claims over Antarctic lands, supported by setting up expanding whaling stations and Antarctic research bases.

Contemporarily territorial claims and activities on Antarctica have been limited since the Antarctic Treaty (1959) by the Antarctic Treaty System and its Protocol on Environmental Protection to the Antarctic Treaty.

== Settlement concepts ==
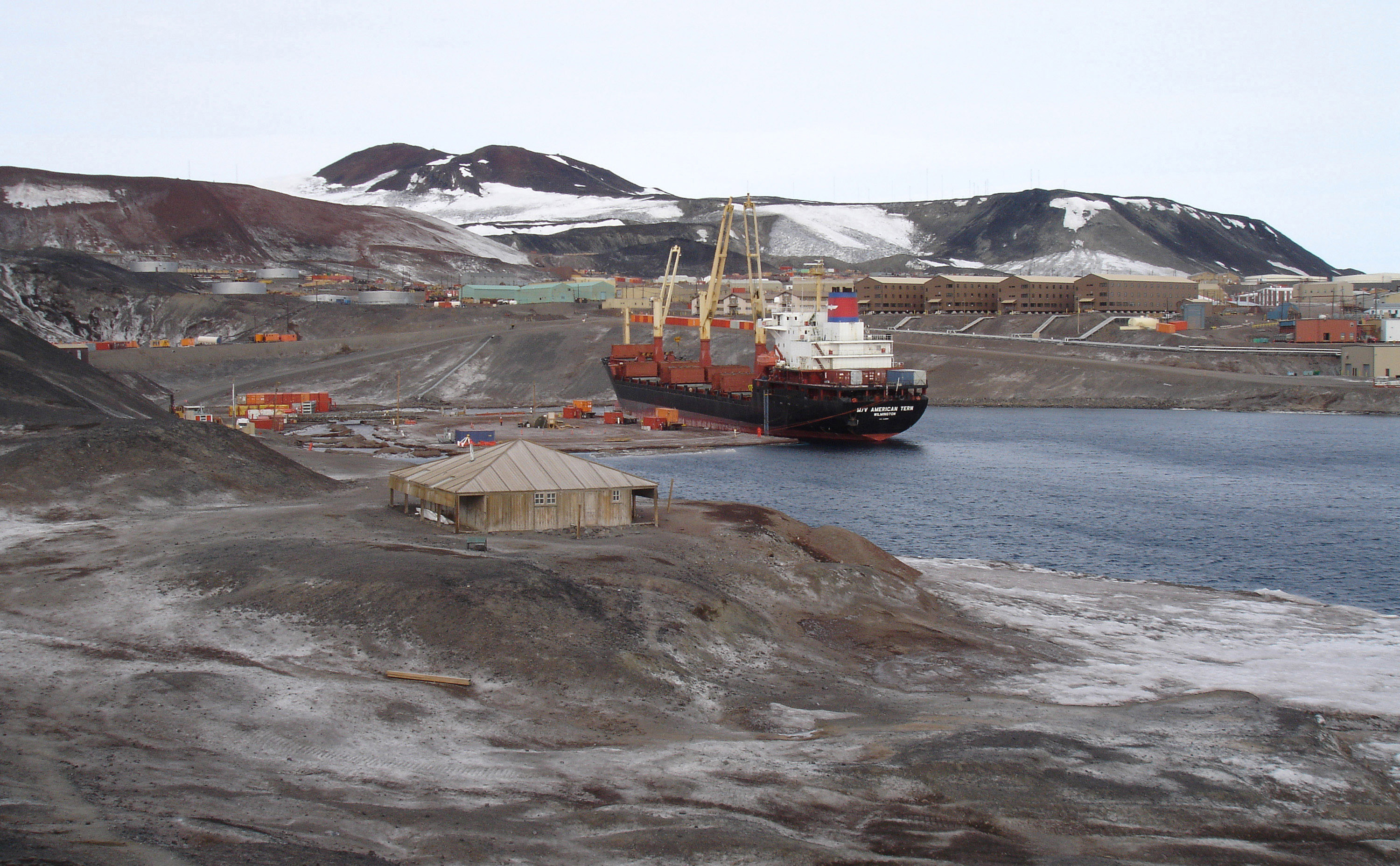
Discovery Hut (1902) at Hut Point Peninsula of Ross Island, Antarctica, one of the earliest used dwellings on Antarctica. In the background, McMurdo Station (1956), the largest on Antarctica today, with cargo operations of the Operation Deep Freeze supply ship MV American Tern (2007).

An idea in the 1950s was to have Antarctic cities enclosed under glass domes. Power and temperature regulation of the domes would come from atomic driven generators outside of these domes. While the Soviets used radioisotope thermal generators in some of their remote Arctic and Antarctic locations, the Americans experimented with nuclear fission, building on their Army nuclear power plant program. The PM-3A nuclear power reactor at McMurdo Station was plagued with reliability issues (achieving an availability factor of only 74%) and was eventually deemed a pollution hazard and consequently shut down and dismantled.

Buckminster Fuller, the developer of the geodesic dome, had raised the possibility of Antarctic domed cities that would allow a controlled climate and buildings erected under the dome. His first specific published proposal for a domed city in 1965 discussed the Antarctic as a likely first location for such a project. The second base at Amundsen–Scott South Pole Station (operated 1975–2003) resembles a reduced version of this idea; it is large enough to cover only a few scientific buildings.

In 1971, a team led by German architect Frei Otto made a feasibility study for an air-supported city dome two kilometers across that could house 40,000 residents. Some authors have recently tried to update the idea.

== Environmental impact ==
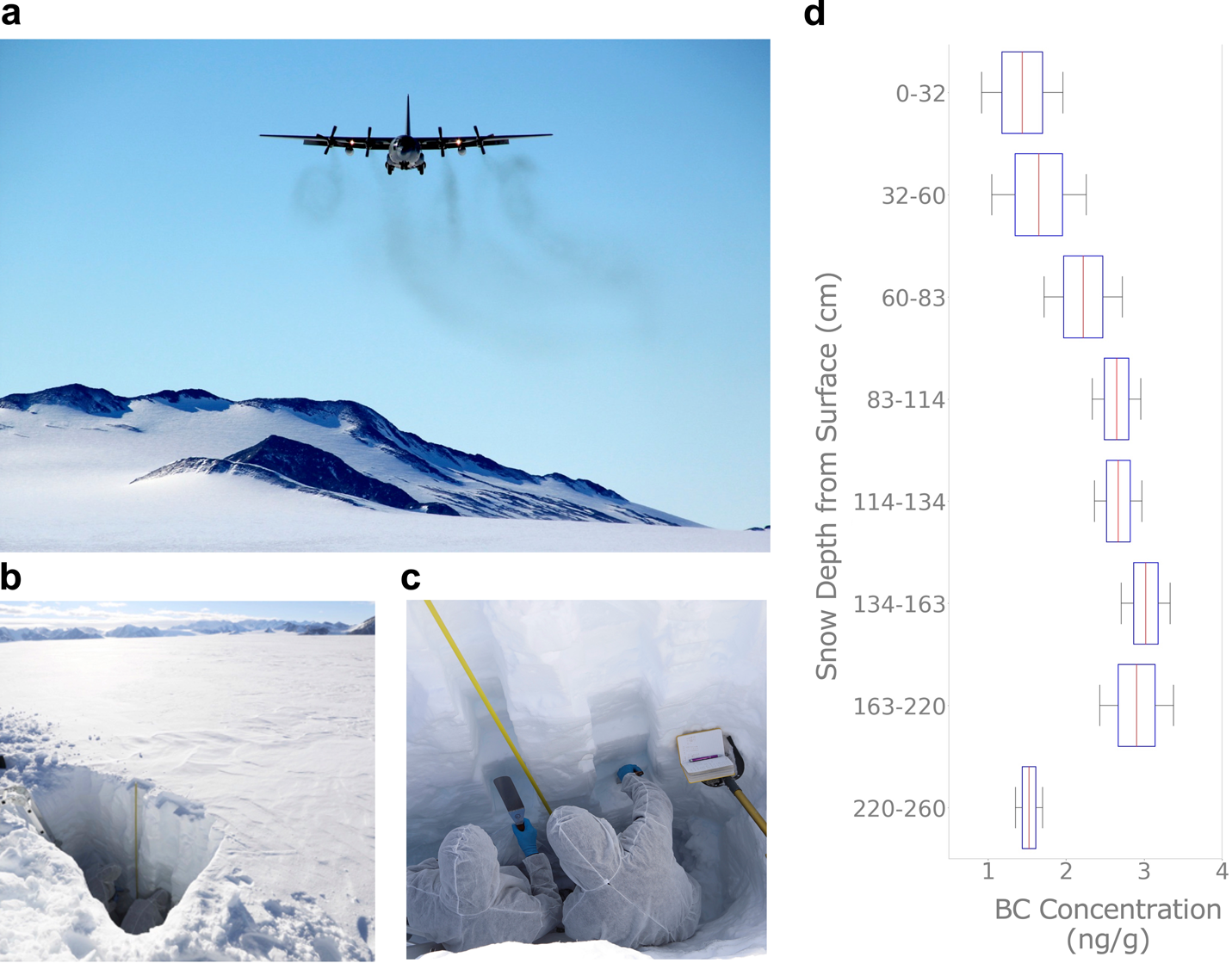
A private C-130 airplane landing onto an ice runway at Union Glacier (upper left), which causes black carbon concentrations to increase in the surrounding snow (right), as observed through sample collection (lower left)

In 2023 a research report from an Australian team found that the pollution left by international research stations was comparable to that seen in some of the busiest ports in the world.

Although today Antarctica's environment is very harsh, conditions may become better in the future. It has been suggested that, as a result of long-term effects of global warming, the beginning of the 22nd century will see parts of West Antarctica experiencing similar climate conditions to those found today in Alaska and Northern Scandinavia. Even farming and crop growing could be possible in some of the most northerly areas of Antarctica.

It is suggested that plants and fungi find a favorable environment around Antarctica's volcanoes to grow, a hint as to where the first agricultural efforts could be led. There are about 110 known native species of moss in Antarctica, and two angiosperms (Deschampsia antarctica and Colobanthus quitensis). It is believed those native species will disappear with warmer weather and the arrival of stronger species. Humans are responsible for the introduction of 200 to 300 outside species on the continent.

Recent scientific surveys of an area near the South Pole have revealed high geothermal heat seeping up to the surface from below.

== Births and deaths on Antarctica ==
The population of Antarctica
1. All-year active research stations (78.6%)
2. Summer-only active research stations (16.1%)
3. All-civilian bases (5.24%)

The oldest known case of a person having died on Antarctic land is from the first half of the 19th century. The person was probably a South American indigenous woman, possibly travelling as a guide for early northern Sealers. Her bones were found in the 1980s on a beach on Livingston Island (South Shetlands) off the Antarctic Peninsula.

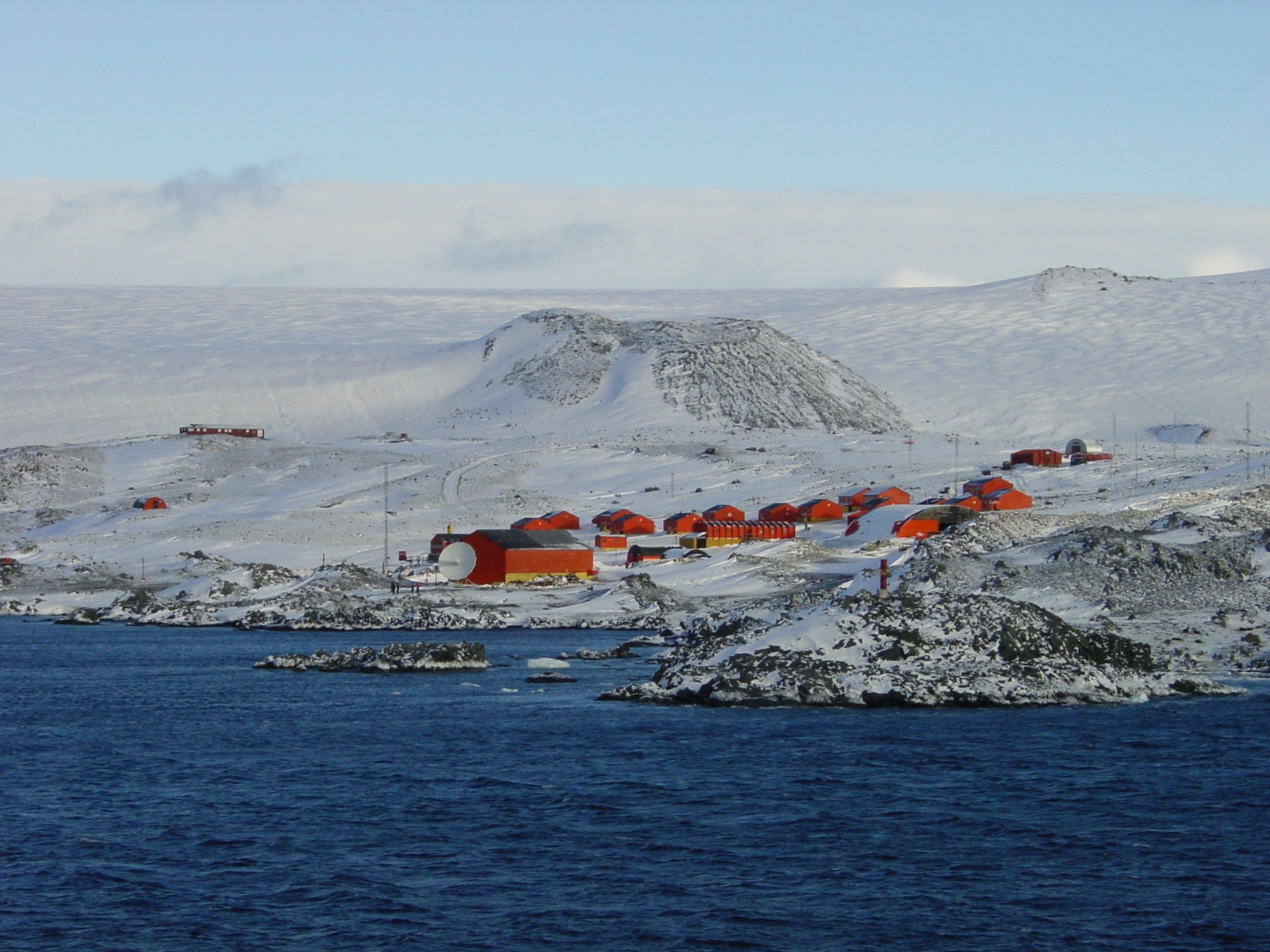
Esperanza Base seen from Hope Bay at the tip of the Antarctic Peninsula, home to the first documented birth on Antarctica

Emilio Marcos Palma (born January 7, 1978) is an Argentine citizen who is the first person known to be born on the continent of Antarctica. He was born in Fortín Sargento Cabral at the Esperanza Base near the tip of the Antarctic Peninsula and weighed 3.4 kg (7 lb 8 oz). Since his birth, about ten others have been born on the continent.

== See also ==
- Antarctic field camps
- Colonialism
- Colonization
- Research stations in Antarctica
- Space colonization
- Territorial claims in Antarctica
