= Territorial claims in Antarctica =

Map of territorial claims in Antarctica, including the unclaimed Marie Byrd Land (Note: The claims of Argentina, Chile, and the United Kingdom partially overlap (as can be seen from the mixed colours above).; Norway claims two territories: Peter I Island (small purple circle near the Chilean claim) and Queen Maud Land.) Argentina Australia Chile France New Zealand Norway United Kingdom

Seven sovereign states – Argentina, Australia, Chile, France, New Zealand, Norway, and the United Kingdom – have made eight territorial claims in Antarctica. These countries have tended to place their Antarctic scientific observation and study facilities within their respective claimed territories; however, a number of such facilities are located outside of the area claimed by their respective countries of operation, and countries without claims such as Belgium, China, India, Italy, Japan, Pakistan, Poland, Russia, South Africa (SANAE), Spain, Ukraine, and the United States have constructed research facilities within the areas claimed by other countries. There are overlaps among the territories claimed by Argentina, Chile, and the United Kingdom.

== History ==
Historical claims to Antarctica

Spanish Empire 1539–1555

Terra Australis 1539–1555

France 1840–present

Adélie Land 1840–present

United Kingdom 1908–present

Falkland Islands Dependencies 1908–1962
British Antarctic Territory 1962–present

New Zealand 1923–present

Ross Dependency 1923–present
Realm of New Zealand 1983-present

Norway 1931–present

Peter I Island 1931–present
Queen Maud Land 1939–present

Australia 1933–present

Australian Antarctic Territory 1933–present

Germany

New Swabia 1939–1945

Chile 1940–present

Chilean Antarctic Territory 1940–present

Argentina 1941–present (Note: Argentina formalized its claim between 74° W and 25° W in 1946, after claiming between 75° W and 25° W in 1941 and between 68°24′ W and 25° W in 1942. Since 1904 it claims the South Orkney Islands, having a presence in the islands.)

Argentine Antarctica 1946–present

=== Spanish claims ===
Map of the Spanish governorate of Terra Australis (1539–1555), the first territorial claim over the lands near the South Pole. It was later incorporated into the Governorate of Chile.

According to Argentina and Chile, the Spanish Crown had claims on Antarctica. The capitulación (governorship) granted to the conquistador Pedro Sánchez de la Hoz in 1539 by the King of Spain, Charles V, explicitly included all lands south of the Straits of Magellan (Terra Australis, Tierra del Fuego and by extension, potentially the entire continent of Antarctica) and to the East and West the borders were the ones specified in the Treaty of Tordesillas and Zaragoza respectively, thus creating the Governorate of Terra Australis.

De la Hoz transferred the title to the conqueror Pedro de Valdivia in 1540. In 1555, the claim was incorporated to Chile.

This grant established, according to Argentina and Chile, that an animus occupandi existed on the part of Spain in Antarctica. Spain's sovereignty claim over parts of Antarctica was, according to Chile and Argentina, internationally recognized with the Inter caetera bull of 1493 and the Treaty of Tordesillas of 1494. Argentina and Chile treat these treaties as legal international treaties mediated by the Catholic Church that was at that time a recognized arbiter in such matters. Each country currently has claimed a sector of the Antarctic continent that is more or less directly south of its national Antarctic-facing lands.

Modern Spain has not claimed any Antarctic territory. It operates two summer research stations (Gabriel de Castilla Base and Juan Carlos I Base) in the South Shetland Islands.

=== British (and later Australian and New Zealand) claims ===
The United Kingdom reasserted sovereignty over the Falkland Islands in the far South Atlantic in 1833 and maintained a continuous presence there since. In 1908, the British government extended its territorial claim by declaring sovereignty over "South Georgia, the South Orkneys, the South Shetlands, and the (South) Sandwich Islands, and Graham's Land, situated in the South Atlantic Ocean and on the Antarctic continent to the south of the 50th parallel of south latitude, and lying between the 20th and the 80th degrees of west longitude". All these territories were administered as Falkland Islands Dependencies from Stanley by the Governor of the Falkland Islands. The claimed motivation for this declaration was what the British said was the need to regulate and tax the whaling industry effectively.

In 1917, the wording of the claim was modified, so as unambiguously to include all the territory in the sector stretching to the South Pole (thus encompassing all the present British Antarctic Territory). The new claim covered "all islands and territories whatsoever between the 20th degree of west longitude and the 50th degree of west longitude which are situated south of the 50th parallel of south latitude; and all islands and territories whatsoever between the 50th degree of west longitude and the 80th degree of west longitude which are situated south of the 58th parallel of south latitude".

It was the ambition of Leopold Amery, then Under-Secretary of State for the Colonies, that the United Kingdom incorporate the entire continent into the Empire. In a memorandum to the governors-general for Australia and New Zealand, he wrote that 'with the exception of Chile and Argentina and some barren islands belonging to France... it is desirable that the whole of the Antarctic should ultimately be included in the British Empire.' The first step was taken on 30 July 1923, when the British government passed an Order in Council under the British Settlements Act 1887, defining the new borders for the Ross Dependency: "that part of His Majesty's Dominions in the Antarctic Seas, which comprises all the islands and territories between the 160th degree of East Longitude and the 150th degree of West Longitude which are situated south of the 60th degree of South Latitude shall be named the Ross Dependency." The Order in Council then went on to appoint the Governor-General and Commander-in Chief of New Zealand as the Governor of the territory.

In 1930, the United Kingdom claimed Enderby Land. In 1933, a British imperial order transferred territory south of 60° S and between meridians 160° E and 45° E to Australia as the Australian Antarctic Territory. This followed the British Australian and New Zealand Antarctic Research Expedition, led by Australian geologist and polar explorer Douglas Mawson, establishing the territorial claim to 42% of the Antarctic during 1929–1930 and 1930–1931.

Following the passing of the Statute of Westminster in 1931, the government of the United Kingdom relinquished all control over the governments of New Zealand and Australia. This, however, had no bearing on the obligations of the governors-general of both countries in their capacity as Governors of the Antarctic territories.

=== Other European claims ===
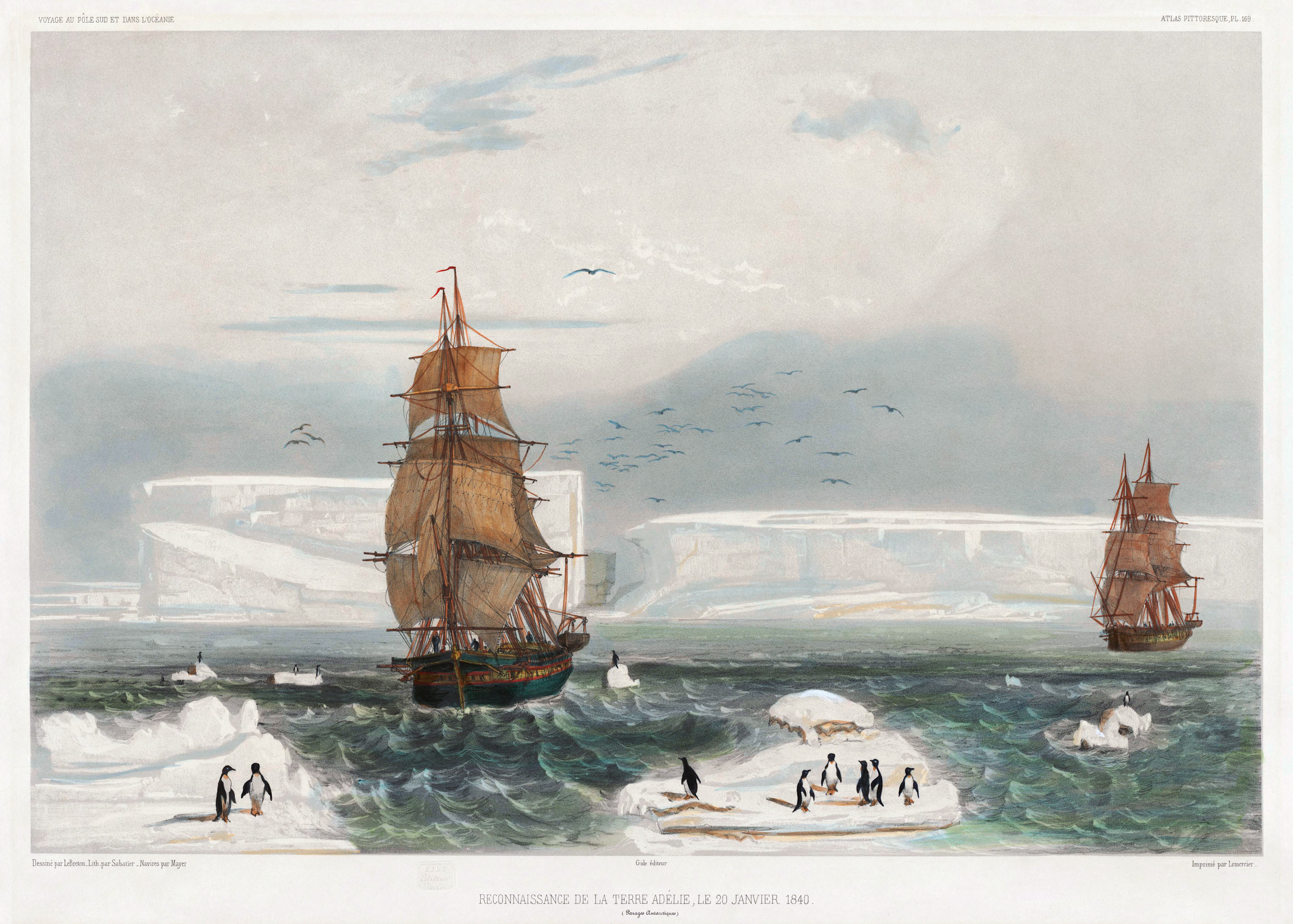
Discovery and claim of French sovereignty on Adélie Land by Jules Dumont d'Urville, in 1840

The basis for the claim to Adélie Land by France depended on the discovery of the coastline in 1840 by the French explorer Jules Dumont d'Urville, who named it after his wife, Adèle. He erected the French flag and took possession of the land for France on 21 January 1840 at 17:30.

The British eventually decided to recognize this claim, and the border between Adélie Land and the Australian Antarctic Territory was fixed definitively in 1938.

These developments also concerned Norwegian whaling interests which wished to avoid British taxation of whaling stations in the Antarctic and felt concern that they would be commercially excluded from the continent. The whale-ship owner Lars Christensen financed several expeditions to the Antarctic with the view to claiming land for Norway and to establishing stations on Norwegian territory to gain better privileges. The first expedition, led by Nils Larsen and Ola Olstad, landed on Peter I Island in 1929 and claimed the island for Norway. On 6 March 1931 a Norwegian royal proclamation declared the island under Norwegian sovereignty and on 23 March 1933 the island was declared a dependency. (Note: At the time of the claim, Norway did not validate the sector method of demarcating polar territory. This was in line with Norwegian claims in the Arctic and hence to avoid compromising Norway's position with regard to the former Soviet Union (present-day Russia). In the 2015 Meld. St. No. 32 (2014–2015) 'Norske interesser og politikk i Antarktis' (White Paper No. 32 on Norwegian Interests and Policy in the Antarctica), the Foreign Ministry confirmed that while Norway rejected the sector method of delimiting claims it was not intended create a difference in interpretation of the Norwegian claim in Antarctica. White Paper No. 19 (1939) had stated that the purpose of the annexation was to annex 'land which is currently terra nullius and that only Norwegians have researched and mapped'.)

The 1929 expedition led by Hjalmar Riiser-Larsen and Finn Lützow-Holm named the continental landmass near the island as Queen Maud Land after the Norwegian queen Maud of Wales. The territory was explored further during the Norvegia expedition of 1930–31. Negotiations with the British government in 1938 resulted in setting the western border of Queen Maud Land at 20°W.

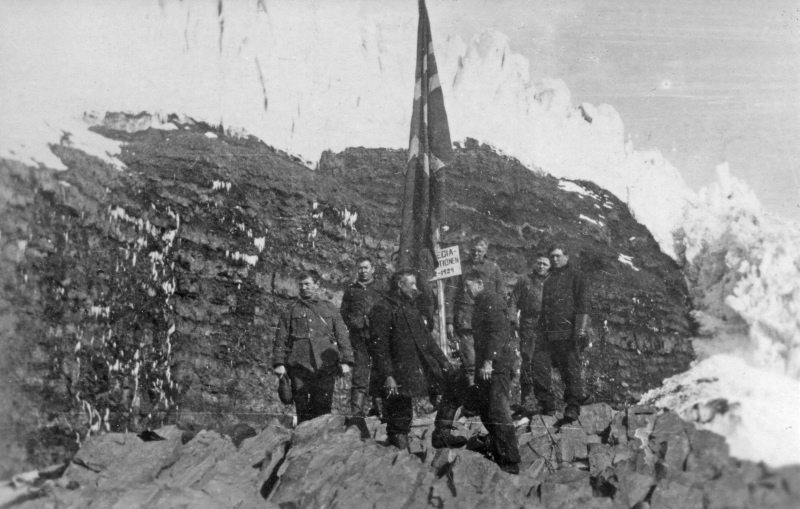
Norwegian expedition landing on Peter I Island in 1929

The United States, Chile, the Soviet Union and Germany disputed Norway's claim. In 1938, Germany dispatched the German Antarctic Expedition, led by Alfred Ritscher, to fly over as much of it as possible. The ship Schwabenland reached the pack ice off Antarctica on 19 January 1939. During the expedition, Ritscher photographed an area of about 350,000 square kilometres (140,000 sq mi) from the air and dropped darts inscribed with swastikas every 26 kilometres (16 mi). However, despite intensively surveying the land, Germany never made any formal claim or constructed any lasting bases. Hence, the German Antarctic claim, known as New Swabia, was disputed at the time, and is currently not taken into account.

On 14 January 1939, five days before the German arrival, Norway annexed Queen Maud Land after a royal decree announced that the land bordering the Falkland Islands Dependencies in the west and the Australian Antarctic Dependency in the east was to be brought under Norwegian sovereignty. The primary aim of the annexation was to secure the Norwegian whaling industry's access to the region. In 1948, Norway and the United Kingdom agreed to limit Norway's longitudinal claims of Queen Maud Land to 20°W to 45°E, and to incorporate the Bruce Coast and Coats Land into Norwegian territory.

=== South American involvement ===
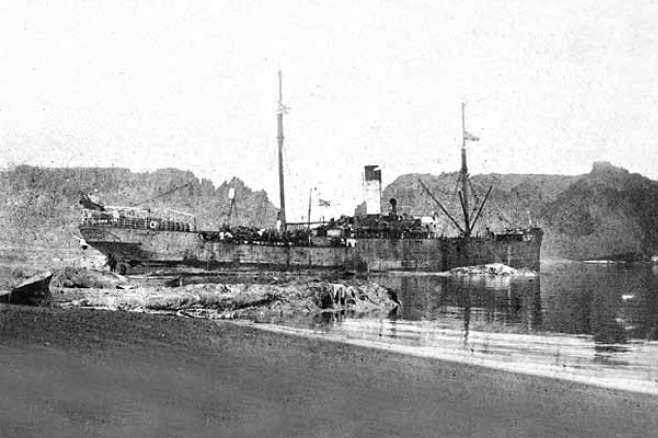
Gobernador Bories, a Chilean factory ship, anchored in Balleneros Cove, Deception Island in 1908.

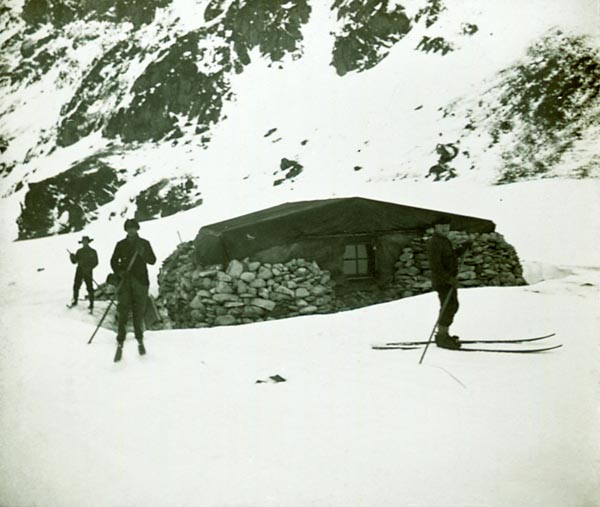
Omond House was built in 1904 by the Scottish National Antarctic Expedition as the first permanent base in Antarctica. It was later sold to Argentina.

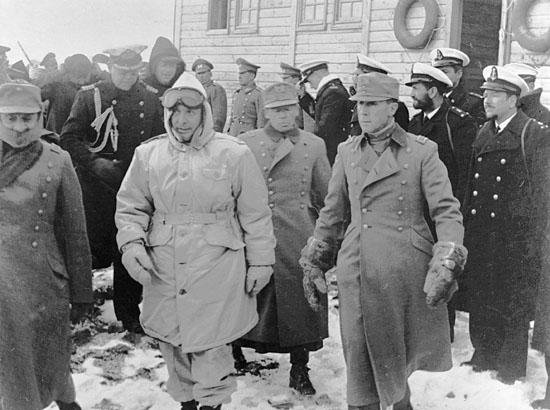
President of Chile Gabriel Gonzalez Videla during his visit in the 1940s. With this he became the first head of government and state to visit Antarctica.

Argentina and Chile have a long history in Antarctica. In 1893, when Argentina started issuing whaling, hunting and fishing licenses in Antarctic waters, the Chilean government protested and issued fishing ordinances of its own. The Chilean Navy was tasked with stopping clandestine fishing vessels, but their presence proved ineffective. Starting from 1903, Chilean whalers visited Deception Island, led by the Norwegian captain Adolf Amandus Andresen under the Chilean flag. In early 1906, the Chilean government granted permits to private business ventures to settle the lands beyond the South Shetland islands, with the goal of establishing a permanent presence in the region and improving Chile's control of the area. The Magellan Whaling Company led by Andresen and Pedro A. de Bruyne was created under Chilean Law and operated from Punta Arenas. Argentina protested immediately. In that same year, the Minister of Foreign Affairs of Chile mentioned on September 18 that the delimitation of Chilean Antarctic territory would be the subject of a preliminary investigation. On 10 June 1907, Argentina formally protested and asked for mutual recognition of Antarctic territories. There was work on a treaty to more concretely define territories in the region, but it was never signed.

Two years before, in 1904, the Argentine government had established a permanent presence in Antarctica with the purchase of a meteorological station on Laurie Island established in 1903 by William S. Bruce's Scottish National Antarctic Expedition. Bruce offered to transfer the station and instruments for the sum of 5,000 pesos, on the condition that the government committed itself to the continuation of the scientific mission. The Envoy at the British Legation in Argentina, William Haggard, also sent a note to the Argentine Foreign Minister, José A. Terry, ratifying the terms of Bruce's proposition. In 1906, Argentina communicated to the international community the establishment of a permanent base in the South Orkney Islands, the Orcadas Base. However, Haggard responded by reminding Argentina that the South Orkneys were British. The British position was that Argentine personnel had been granted permission for a period of one year. The Argentine government would later enter into negotiations with the British over the possible transfer of the island. Although these talks were unsuccessful, Argentina attempted to unilaterally establish its sovereignty with the erection of markers, national flags and other symbols.

Chile's government didn't completely reject Argentina's protest and negotiations ensued between both countries through most of 1906 and 1907, trying to define the borders of their respective Antarctic claims. Chilean diplomats proposed dividing the area in two by tracing a straight line from the South Shetlands towards the South Pole, but the idea was rejected by their Argentine counterparts. Both countries eventually decided to define the borders of their respective claims on their own.

In 1908, the British ship Telefon, which was carrying coal for the supply of whalers on King George Island in the South Shetland Islands, ran aground on the reefs of Admiralty Bay (now known as Telefon Rocks) and was abandoned by its crew due to severe damage. Upon learning of the incident on Deception Island, several ships set sail for the site. Captain Andresen, aboard the Chilean whaler Almirante Valenzuela, arrived first, boarded the abandoned ship in a dangerous maneuver, raised the Chilean flag and claimed it according to maritime law. He towed it to Deception Island, beaching it in a cove (now Telefon Cove) for repairs. The following spring, the factory ship Gobernador Bories repaired it successfully, allowing the Telefon to sail again under the Chilean flag. The whaling society acquired the steamship Telefon that belonged to the Lloyds company in 1910, which had been put up for auction after the accident.

On January 14, 1939, Norway declared its territorial claims on Antarctic territory between 0° and 20° (Queen Maud Land). This alarmed the Chilean government, which led President Pedro Aguirre Cerda to encourage the definition of the National Antarctic Territory. With the establishment of Decree No. 1541 on September 7, he organized a commission to examine Norway's interests in the Antarctic territory led by Julio Escudero Guzmán. The Commander Ramón Cañas Montalva demanded on April 1, 1940, that the Chilean borders in the Antarctic should be explicitly stated as soon as possible.

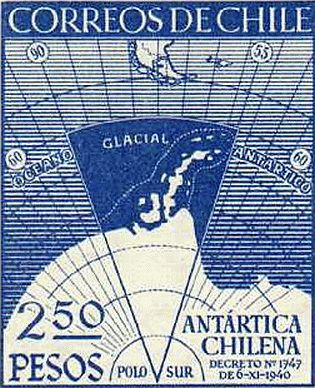
Commemorative stamp of the Chilean Antarctic declaration of 1940

Taking advantage of a European continent plunged into turmoil with the onset of the Second World War, Chile's president, Pedro Aguirre Cerda declared the establishment of a Chilean Antarctic Territory based on the uti possidetis juris principle inheriting the Spanish Governorate of Terra Australis of 1539, transferred to the Governorate of Chile in 1555. The Chilean commission, with the ad honorem work of Julio Escudero, set the bounds according to the theory of polar areas, taking into account geographical, historical, legal, and diplomatic precedents, which were formalized by Decree No. 1747, enacted on November 6, 1940, and published on June 21, 1955. According to Pablo Ihl, the inherited Antarctic rights of Chile had as its eastern border the Tordesillas meridian located further east than the claimed 53° W. Thus, some authors claim that the country avoided to include the South Orkney Islands (Note: Some Chilean nationalist sources like Oscar Espinosa Moraga, claim that Chile resigned a third of its Antarctic sector in favor of Argentina, without explaining where to take the data, which the Tordesillas line passing through the meridian 37° 7'West however, classically it considered that Spain stood at 46° 37 'West.) by considering the rights of Argentina over them, however most of the calculations of the Tordesillas meridian are west of the mentioned islands. Argentina formally protested the Chilean decree in a note on November 12 November 1940, rejecting Chile's claim and expressing a potential claim to the same area. In the 20th Century these areas were claimed by Britain.

In June 1939, Argentina created a provisional Antarctic commission to participate in the International Polar Conference to be held in Norway in 1940. On April 30, 1940, a permanent National Antarctic Commission was established that led to the definition of a claim on the Antarctic mainland. Argentina published a map in 1941 showing "the Antarctic Sector in which the Argentine Republic maintains rights" between 75° W and 25° W, south of 60° S, without a formal legal claim yet. In January 1942, Argentina declared its Antarctic rights between the meridians at 25° and 68° 34' W, south of 60° S, establishing the Argentine Antarctica, according to the theory of polar areas. (Note: Oscar Espinosa Moraga claims it was on the 68° 24' W meridian instead of 68° 34' W, being a direct projection from Punta Dúngeness.)On September 2, 1946, Decree No. 8944 required all the national maps to show the claimed territory of the Argentine Antarctic Sector, which was extended between the meridians at 25° and 74° west longitude (near the far east of the South Sandwich Islands), south of 60° S by the National Antarctic Commission.

In 1943, the British Admiralty and Colonial Office launched Operation Tabarin with the goal of asserting British territorial claims and establishing a permanent presence in the region. The move was also motivated by concerns within the Foreign Office about the direction of United States post-war activity in the region. A suitable cover story was the need to deny use of the area to the Kriegsmarine, which was known to use remote islands as rendezvous points and as shelters for commerce raiders, U-boats and supply ships. Also, in 1941, there existed a fear that Japan might attempt to seize the Falkland Islands, either as a base or to hand them over to Argentina, thus gaining political advantage for the Axis and denying their use to the United Kingdom.

In 1943, British personnel from HMS Carnarvon Castle removed Argentine flags from Deception Island. The expedition was led by Lieutenant James Marr and left the Falkland Islands in two ships, HMS William Scoresby (a minesweeping trawler) and Fitzroy, on 29 January 1944.

Bases were established during February near the abandoned Norwegian whaling station on Deception Island, where the Union Flag was hoisted in place of Argentine flags, and at Port Lockroy (on 11 February) on the coast of Graham Land. A further base was founded at Hope Bay on 13 February 1945, after a failed attempt to unload stores on 7 February 1944. Symbols of British sovereignty, including post offices, signposts and plaques were also constructed and postage stamps were issued.

Operation Tabarin provoked Chile to organise its First Chilean Antarctic Expedition in 1947–48, where the Chilean president Gabriel González Videla personally inaugurated one of its bases.

Following the end of the war in 1945, the British bases were handed over to civilian members of the newly created Falkland Islands Dependencies Survey (subsequently the British Antarctic Survey), the first such national scientific body to be established in Antarctica.

=== Postwar developments ===
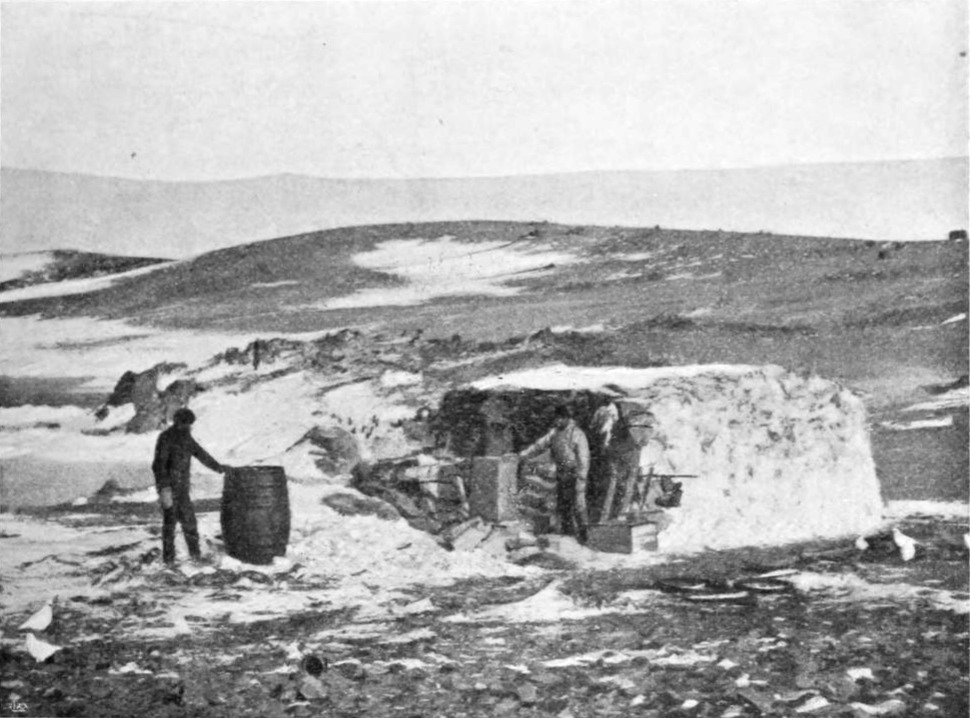
Hut built at Hope Bay in 1903. It was there that the only instance of shots fired in anger on the Continent occurred in 1952.

Friction between the United Kingdom and Argentina continued into the postwar period. Royal Navy warships were dispatched in 1948 to prevent naval incursions. The only instance of shots fired in anger on Antarctica occurred in 1952 at Hope Bay, when staff at British Base "D" (established 1945) came up against the Argentine team at Esperanza Base (est. 1952), who fired a machine gun over the heads of a British Antarctic Survey team unloading supplies from the John Biscoe. The Argentines later extended a diplomatic apology, saying that there had been a misunderstanding and that the Argentine military commander on the ground had exceeded his authority.

The United States became politically interested in the Antarctic continent before and during WWII. The United States Antarctic Service Expedition, from 1939 to 1941, was sponsored by the government with additional support from donations and gifts by private citizens, corporations and institutions. The objective of the Expedition, outlined by President Franklin D. Roosevelt, was to establish two bases: East Base, in the vicinity of Charcot Island, and West Base, in the vicinity of King Edward VII Land. After operating successfully for two years but with international tensions on the rise, it was considered wise to evacuate the two bases. However, immediately after the war, American interest was rekindled with an explicitly geopolitical motive. Operation Highjump, from 1946 to 1947 was organised by Rear Admiral Richard E. Byrd Jr. and included 4,700 men, 13 ships, and multiple aircraft. The primary mission of Operation Highjump was to establish the Antarctic research base Little America IV, for the purpose of training personnel and testing equipment in frigid conditions and amplifying existing stores of knowledge of hydrographic, geographic, geological, meteorological and electromagnetic propagation conditions in the area. The mission was also aimed at consolidating and extending United States sovereignty over the largest practicable area of the Antarctic continent, although this was publicly denied as a goal even before the expedition ended.

=== Towards an international treaty ===
The International Geophysical Year was pivotal in establishing a cooperative international framework in Antarctica, and led on to the Antarctic Treaty System in 1959.

Meanwhile, in an attempt at ending the impasse, the United Kingdom submitted an application to the International Court of Justice in 1955 to adjudicate between the territorial claims of the United Kingdom, Argentina, and Chile. This proposal failed, as both Latin American countries rejected submitting to an international arbitration procedure.

Negotiations towards the establishment of an international condominium over the continent first began in 1948, involving the 8 claimant countries: United Kingdom, Australia, New Zealand, US, France, Norway, Chile and Argentina. This attempt was aimed at excluding the Soviet Union from the affairs of the continent and rapidly fell apart when the USSR declared an interest in the region, refused to recognize any claims of sovereignty and reserved the right to make its own claims in 1950.

An important impetus toward the formation of the Antarctic Treaty System in 1959 was the International Geophysical Year (IGY), 1957–1958. This year of international scientific cooperation triggered an 18-month period of intense Antarctic science. More than 70 existing national scientific organisations then formed IGY committees, and participated in the cooperative effort. The British established Halley Research Station in 1956 by an expedition from the Royal Society. Sir Vivian Fuchs headed the Commonwealth Trans-Antarctic Expedition, which completed the first overland crossing of Antarctica in 1958. In Japan, the Japan Maritime Safety Agency offered ice breaker Sōya as the South Pole observation ship and Showa Station was built as the first Japanese observation base on Antarctica.

France contributed with Dumont d'Urville Station and Charcot Station in Adélie Land. The ship Commandant Charcot of the French Navy spent nine months of 1949/50 at the coast of Adélie Land, performing ionospheric soundings. The US erected the Amundsen–Scott South Pole Station as the first permanent structure directly over the South Pole in January 1957.

=== Treaty agreed ===
Finally, to prevent the possibility of military conflict in the region, the United States, United Kingdom, the Soviet Union, and 9 other countries with significant interests negotiated and signed the Antarctic Treaty in 1959. The treaty entered into force in 1961 and sets aside Antarctica as a scientific preserve, established freedom of scientific investigation, and banned military activity on that continent. The treaty was the first arms control agreement established during the Cold War.

== Antarctic territorial claims ==
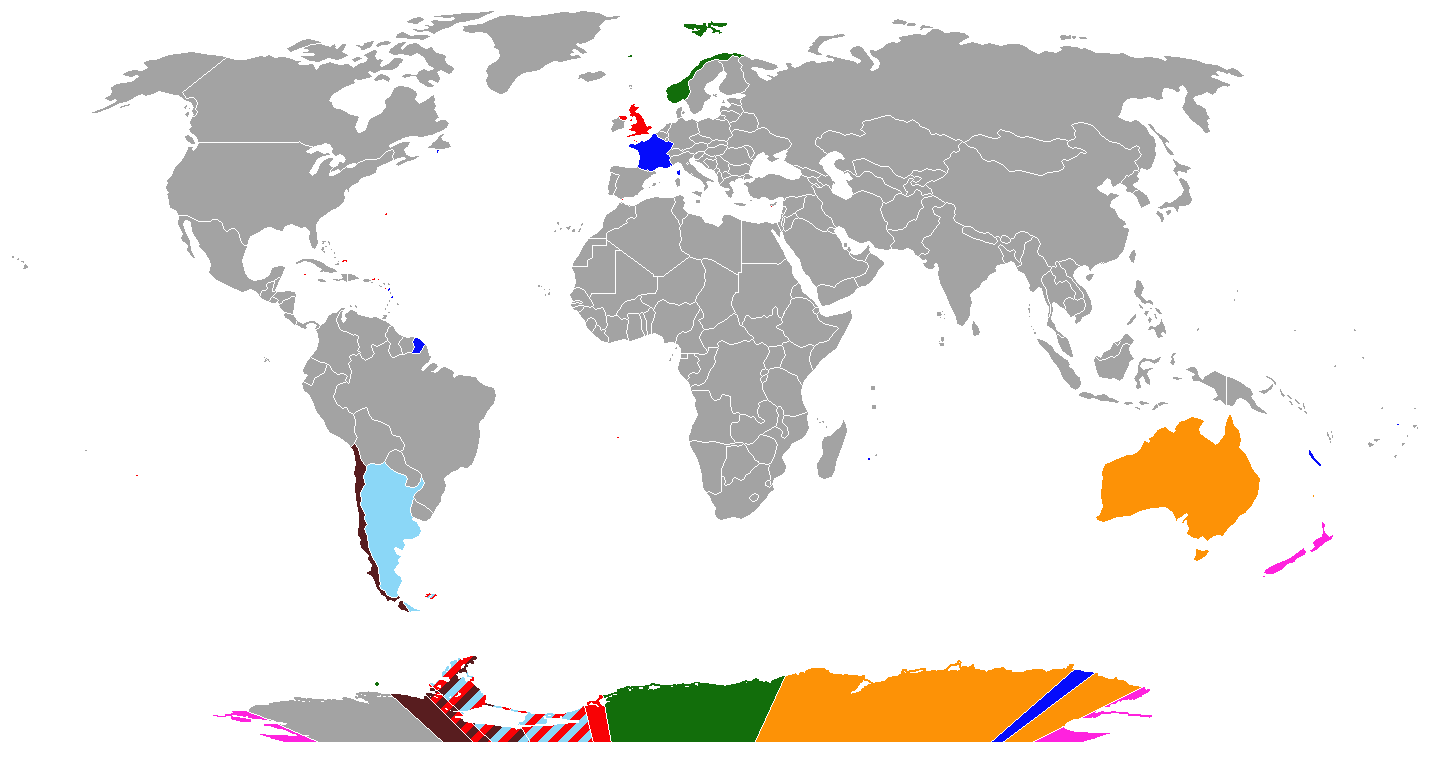
Territorial claims in Antarctica

Seven sovereign states had made eight territorial claims to land in Antarctica south of the 60° S parallel before 1961. None of these claims have an indigenous population.

All claim areas are sectors with the exception of Peter I Island. The South Orkney Islands fall within the territory claimed by Argentina and the United Kingdom, and the South Shetland Islands fall within the areas claimed by Argentina, Chile, and the United Kingdom.

These claims have been recognized only between (some of) the seven claiming states. The United Kingdom, France, Australia, New Zealand and Norway all recognize each other's claims (none of their claims overlap with each other).

Prior to 1962, the British South Atlantic and Antarctic dependencies were administered from the Falkland Islands. They included South Georgia and the South Sandwich Islands. The Antarctic areas collectively became a separate British Overseas Territory following the ratification of the Antarctic Treaty. South Georgia and the South Sandwich Islands remained as dependencies until 1985 when they too became a separate overseas territory.

=== Official claims south of 60° S ===
| Flag | Territory | Claimant | Date | Claim limits/Coordinates | Area (km^{2}) |
|---|---|---|---|---|---|
| | Adélie Land (District of the French Southern and Antarctic Lands) | France | 1840 | 136°E–142°E | 351,000 |
| | Argentine Antarctica (Department of Tierra del Fuego, Antarctica, and South Atlantic Islands Province) | Argentina | 1946 | 25°W–74°W | 1,461,597 |
| | Australian Antarctic Territory (External Territory of Australia) | Australia | 1933 | 160°E–142°E; 136°E–44°38′E | 5,896,500 |
| | British Antarctic Territory (British Overseas Territory) | United Kingdom | 1908 | 20°W–80°W | 1,709,400 |
| Magallanes y la Antártica Chilena, Chile | Chilean Antarctic Territory (Commune of Antártica, in Antártica Chilena Province) | Chile | 1940 | 53°W–90°W | 1,250,257.6 |
| | Peter I Island (Dependency of Norway) | Norway | 1931 | 68°51′S 90°35′W | 154 |
| | Queen Maud Land (Dependency of Norway) | Norway | 1939 | 44°38′E–20°W | 2,700,000 |
| | Ross Dependency (Dependency of New Zealand) | New Zealand | 1923 | 150°W–160°E | 450,000 |
| Total | | | | | 13,899,908.6 |

==== Overlapping claims ====
| Claimants | Extent of overlap |
|---|---|
| Argentina, United Kingdom | 25°W–53°W |
| Argentina, Chile, United Kingdom | 53°W–74°W |
| Chile, United Kingdom | 74°W–80°W |

==== Unclaimed ====
| Region | Unclaimed limits | Area (km^{2}) |
|---|---|---|
| Marie Byrd Land | 90°W–150°W | 1,610,000 |

=== Official claims of Antarctic islands north of 60° S ===
Four island territories on the Antarctic Plate located north of the 60° South circle of latitude are associated with the continent of Antarctica. They are not subject to the Antarctic Treaty System. None of these territories has an indigenous population.

- Bouvet Island (Dependency of Norway)
- French Southern Territories (Note: Excluding the Scattered Islands in the Indian Ocean, which is associated with Africa, and Adélie Land.) (Overseas territory of France)
- Heard Island and McDonald Islands (External territory of Australia)
- Prince Edward Islands (Overseas possession of South Africa)

Another island territory, partly located on the South Sandwich Plate and partly on the Scotia Plate, (Note: However, experts in plate tectonics have been unable to determine whether the South Georgian Island Group is (still) a part of the Scotia Plate or have recently been accreted to the South American Plate.) is sometimes associated with the continent of Antarctica (since both of those are minor tectonic plates that border the major Antarctic Plate).

- South Georgia and the South Sandwich Islands (British Overseas Territory) under sovereignty claim dispute with Argentina.

=== Possible future claims ===
The United States and Russia (as a successor state of the Soviet Union) maintain they have reserved the right to make claims. There has also been speculation on Brazil making a claim bounded by 53° W and 28° W, thus overlapping with the Argentine and British claims but not with the Chilean claim. Peru made a reservation of its territory rights under the principle of Antarctic defrontation and due to influence on its climate, ecology and marine biology, adducing, in addition, geological continuity and historical links.

Uruguayan adhesion to the Antarctic Treaty System includes a declaration that it reserves its rights in Antarctica in accordance with international law.

In 1967, Ecuador declared its right over an area bounded by 84°30' W and 95°30' W, thus overlapping with the Chilean claim and Norway's claim of Peter I Island. The claim was ratified in 1987, and included in Article 4 of the 2008 Constitution of Ecuador.

In March 2013, Mohammad Bagheri, General Staff of the Armed Forces of the Islamic Republic of Iran, said that Iran can claim sovereignty over part of the South Pole under international law according to latitude. Due to the possibility of access to the South Pole through the Makran Sea and the lack of any land between Iran's eastern coast and Antarctica, the Iranian sector with an approximate length of 3,000 km and width of 405 km and an approximate area of 200 to 250 thousand square kilometers would conflict with Australia's claims and would include Mawson Station.

== Antarctic Treaty ==
The Antarctic Treaty and related agreements regulate international relations with respect to Antarctica, Earth's only continent without a native human population. The treaty has now been signed by 58 countries, including the United Kingdom, the United States, and the now-defunct Soviet Union. The treaty set aside Antarctica as a scientific preserve, established freedom of scientific investigation and banned military activity on that continent. This was the first arms control agreement established during the Cold War.

The Antarctic Treaty states that contracting to the treaty:

- is not a renunciation of any previous territorial claim
- does not affect the basis of claims made as a result of activities of the signatory nation within Antarctica
- does not affect the rights of a state under customary international law to recognise (or refuse to recognise) any other territorial claim

What the treaty does affect is new claims:

- No activities occurring after 1961 can be the basis of a territorial claim.
- No new claim can be made.
- No claim can be enlarged.

The Soviet Union and the United States both filed reservations against the restriction on new claims, and the United States and Russia assert their right to make claims in the future if they so choose. Brazil maintains the Comandante Ferraz (the Brazilian Antarctic Base) and has proposed a theory to delimit territories using meridians, which would give it and other countries a claim.

In general, territorial claims below the 60° S parallel have only been recognised among those countries making claims in the area. However, although claims are often indicated on maps of Antarctica, this does not signify de jure recognition. All claim areas except Peter I Island are sectors, the borders of which are defined by degrees of longitude. In terms of latitude, the northern border of all sectors is the 60° S parallel (which does not cut through any piece of land, continent or island) and is also the northern limit of the Antarctic Treaty. The southern borders of all sectors are one single point, the South Pole. The Norwegian sector used to be an exception regarding latitude: the original claim of 1930 did not specify a northern or a southern limit, so that its territory was only defined by eastern and western limits. However, the Norwegian government stated in 2003 that the northern extent of the Norwegian territory conforms to general practice by extending 12 nautical miles (22 km) from the shore. Furthermore, in 2015, Norway formally declared that its claim extended south to the pole.

== See also ==
- Colonization of Antarctica
- Demographics of Antarctica
- Human outpost
- Research stations in Antarctica
- Territorial claims in the Arctic
