= Aerovías DAP =

Chilean airline

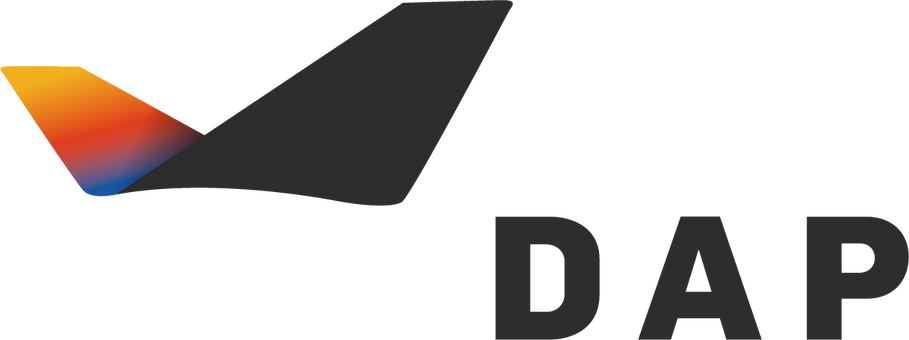
IATA	ICAO	Call sign
V5	DAP	DAP
- Founded: 1980
- Hubs: Presidente Carlos Ibáñez del Campo International Airport
- Fleet size: 30
- Destinations: 11
- Headquarters: Punta Arenas, Chile
- Website: https://dapairline.com/

DAP is a Chilean airline that operates charter and scheduled flights, with its base in Punta Arenas, Chile. The DAP group is a consortium formed by Aerovías DAP, AeroRescate, Antarctic Airways, DAP Antarctica, DAP Helicópteros and Mineral Airways.

== History ==
The airline was established in 1980 and is wholly owned by the Pivcevic family. "DAP" is the acronym of its creator, Domingo Andrés Pivcevic, a Punta Arenas businessman. Its first flight was with a de Havilland Canada DHC-6 Twin Otter that to this day flies with the company.

Realising the need for air transport in the area of Magallanes, the company acquired a Piper PA-31 Navajo that it employed for a couple of years, before replacing it with two Cessna 402 units and a Beechcraft King Air 100. Its first operations were between Punta Arenas, Porvenir, Puerto Williams and Puerto Natales, with some charter operations to other cities of Chilean and Argentinean Patagonia.

At the beginning of the 1990s, the company flew from Punta Arenas to the Falkland Islands, for which it soon incorporated two Boeing 727-100 units that operated the Santiago-Punta Arenas-Mount Pleasant route. However, the three large commercial airlines in Chile (LAN Chile, Ladeco and National Airlines) worked together to bring prices down to fight the competition established by DAP, which finally retired from the market, filing a lawsuit citing unloyal competition. In 2007, DAP was paid a legal compensation by the offending airlines.

In over 36 years of continuous operation, DAP has not registered any accidents that put to risk life or limb of any passengers, including over 100.000 flight hours by its helicopter company DAP Helicópteros.

== Flying to Antarctica ==
Another of the air routes operated by Aerovías DAP is the flight from Punta Arenas to Presidente Eduardo Frei Montalva base, located at aerodrome Teniente Rodolfo Marsh, in King George Island, on the Antarctic territory claimed by Chile. The first flight to Antarctica took place on February 12, 1989 on the Twin Otter, later incorporating a King Air 100 for this operation. Starting in 2003, two de Havilland Canada DHC-7 aircraft were leased for this summer operation. These airplanes flew to Antarctica as well as being employed in other routes DAP held in Patagonia at the time.

In 2007, the airline leased a BAe 146-200 that was operated by the British company Flightline. This plane began flying to Antarctica with DAP in early 2008.

Currently, through its brand Antarctic Airways, DAP carries out 76% of all air traffic between Antarctica and America, using two BAe 146-200 and a King Air 300.

== Destinations ==
City	Airport code		Airport name	Notes
City	IATA	ICAO	Airport name	Notes
Domestic
Chile
Punta Arenas	PUQ	SCCI	Presidente Carlos Ibáñez del Campo International Airport	HUB
Balmaceda	BBA	SCBA	Balmaceda Airport	
Puerto Natales	PNT	SCNT	Teniente Julio Gallardo Airport	
Porvenir	WPR	SCFM	Capitán Fuentes Martínez Airport	
Pampa Guanaco	-	SCBI	Pampa Guanaco Aerodrome	(via WPR)
Puerto Williams	WPU	SCGZ	Guardiamarina Zañartu Airport	
Villa Las Estrellas (Antarctica)	TNM	SCRM	Teniente Rodolfo Marsh Martin Airport	
International
Argentina
Comodoro Rivadavia	CRD	SAVC	General Enrique Mosconi International Airport	(via BBA)
El Calafate	FTE	SAWC	Comandante Armando Tola International Airport	(via PNT)
Ushuaia	USH	SAWH	Malvinas Argentinas International Airport	

== Fleet ==
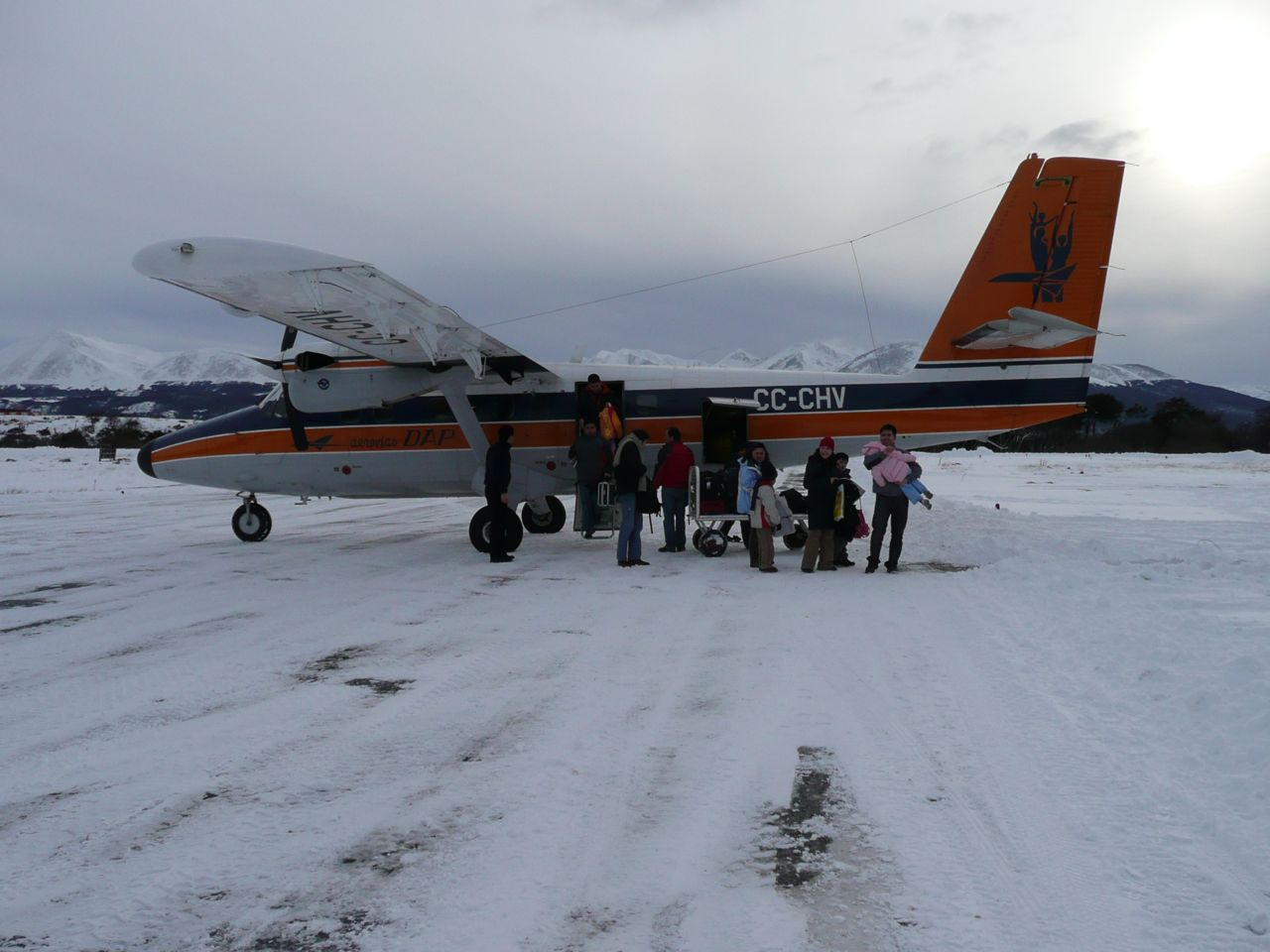
Aerovías DAP DHC-6 Series 300 at Puerto Williams

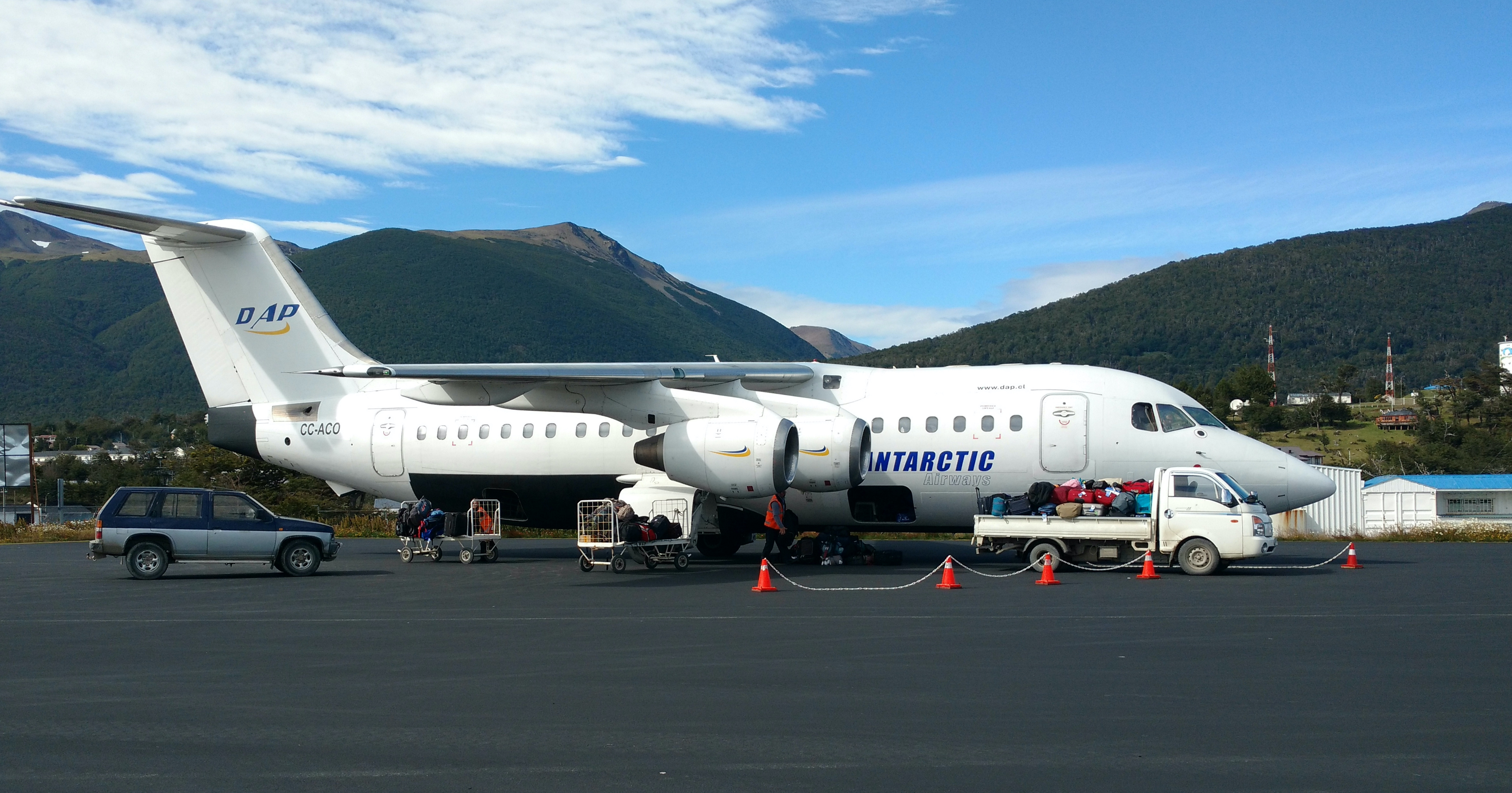
Aerovías DAP at Puerto Williams in summer 2016

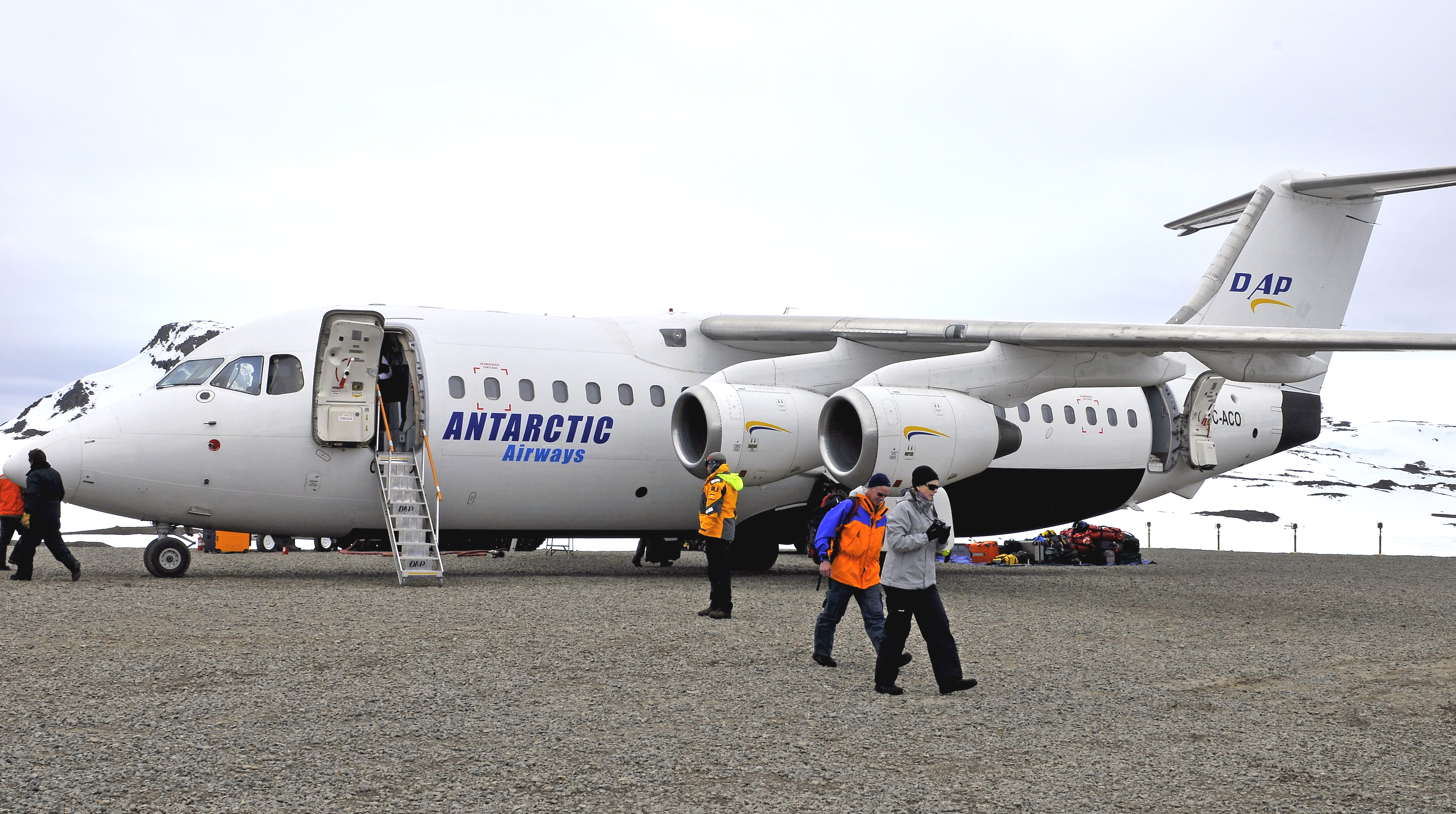
Aerovías DAP at Villa Las Estrellas, Antarctica, in summer 2012

The Aerovías DAP fleet includes the following aircraft:

- 3 Avro RJ100 (as of August 2019)
- 2 Avro RJ85 (as of August 2019)
- 1 British Aerospace 146-100
- 3 British Aerospace 146-200 (as of August 2018)
- 1 De Havilland Canada DHC-6 Twin Otter Series 300 (as of August 2019)
- 1 CASA 212-100 (stored)
- 2 Cessna 402C
- 1 Beechcraft King Air 100
- 1 Beechcraft King Air 300
- 1 De Havilland Canada Q400

DAP Helicópteros fleet comprises:

- 4 Eurocopter AS355F TwinStar
- 5 Eurocopter BO105CB4
- 4 Eurocopter BO105CBS
- 1 Eurocopter EC135T1 (incorporated May 2007)
- 1 Eurocopter AS350B3

== See also ==
- Air ambulance
