= Teniente Rodolfo Marsh Martin Airport =

Teniente Rodolfo Marsh Martin Airport Villa Las Estrellas Airport
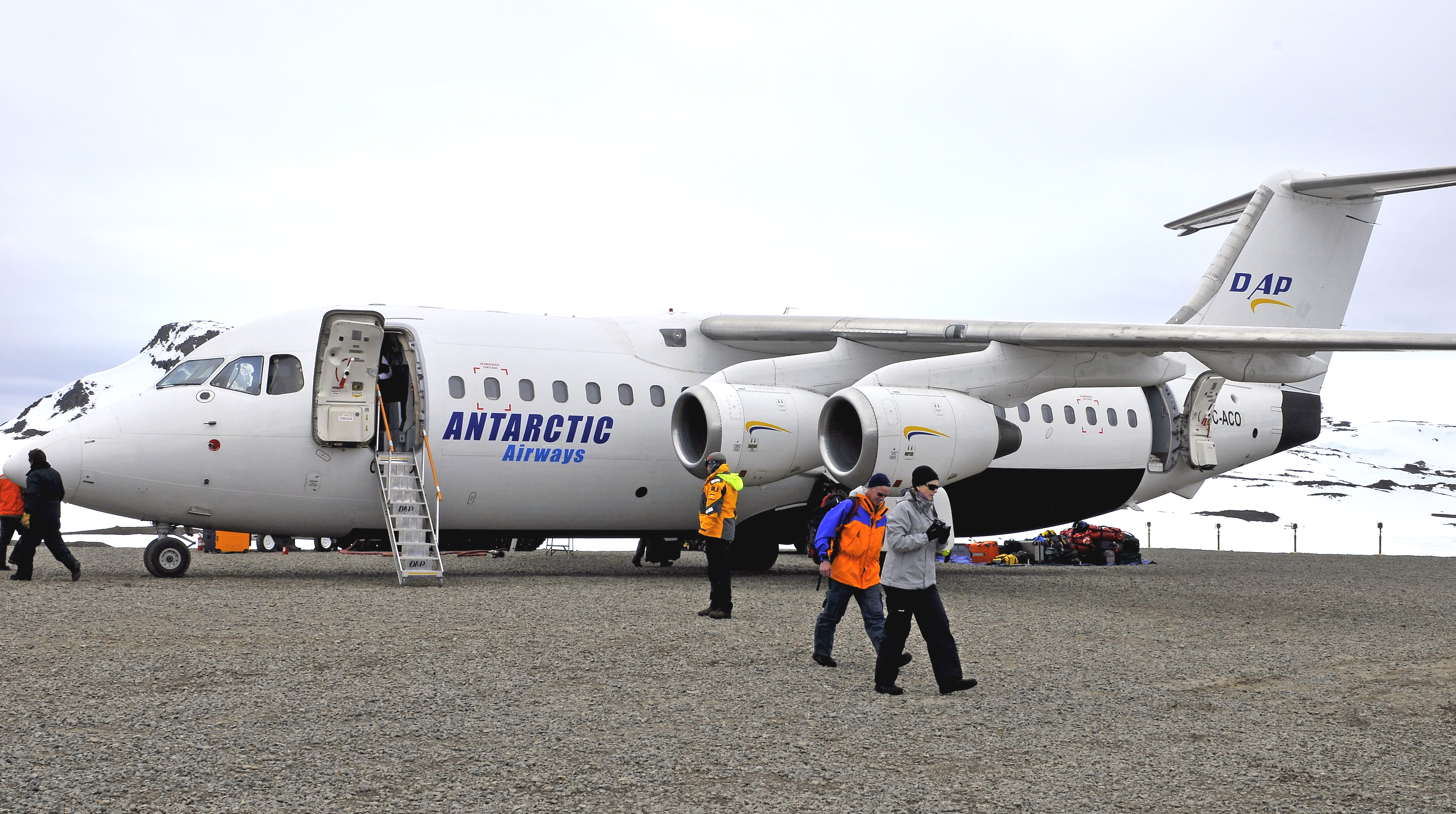
- A DAP Airways plane at the airport
- IATA: TNM; ICAO: SCRM

Summary
- Airport type: Public
- Operator: Aeropuertos Chile
- Serves: Villa Las Estrellas and Base Presidente Eduardo Frei Montalva, Chile
- Elevation AMSL: 147 ft (45 m)
- Coordinates: 62°11′28″S 58°59′10″W

Map
- Location of airport in Antarctica

Runways
Direction	Length		Surface
Direction	m	ft	Surface
11/29	1,292	4,239	Gravel
- Sources: GCM, Landings, Google Maps, AIP Chile

The Teniente Rodolfo Marsh Martin Airport (IATA: TNM, ICAO: SCRM) is on King George Island, part of Chile's Antártica commune in Antarctica, and is the northernmost airport in the continent. It serves the nearby village of Villa Las Estrellas and the Base Presidente Eduardo Frei Montalva.

The airport has five small buildings (hangar, control tower) and a small apron area for parking aircraft.

The Isla Rey Jorge non-directional beacon Punta Arenas (Ident: IRJ) is located 0.46 nautical miles (0.9 km) off the approach threshold of Runway 30. The Isla Rey Jorge VOR-DME (Ident: IRJ) is located on the field.

The airport uses the GMT -4:00 time zone.

There is no regular scheduled public service to the airport, although Aerovías DAP has some charter flights from Punta Arenas.

The airport is named in memory of Lieutenant Rodolfo Marsh, who in the 1930s helped pioneer air routes to the Magallanes Region of Chile, mainly using Sikorsky S43 flying boats. He was killed when his plane, the S43 "Chiloé", crashed on 2 June 1937 flying from Puerto Montt to Punta Arenas. The crash occurred during bad weather, killing all four crew and five passengers.

== Accidents and incidents ==
- 25 February 1992 – Ejército de Chile (Chile) CASA 235M-100 with 11 on board crashed at the airport. No deaths or injuries were reported. The aircraft was written off.
- 28 June 2025 - Ethan Guo, an American attempting to visit all seven continents in his single engine Cessna, landed without authorization at the airport and was detained by Chilean authorities. As of August 2025, he was granted permission to leave if he could find transportation, but not to fly the plane.

== See also ==
- Transport in Chile
- List of airports in Chile
- List of airports in Antarctica
