= Demographics of Antarctica =

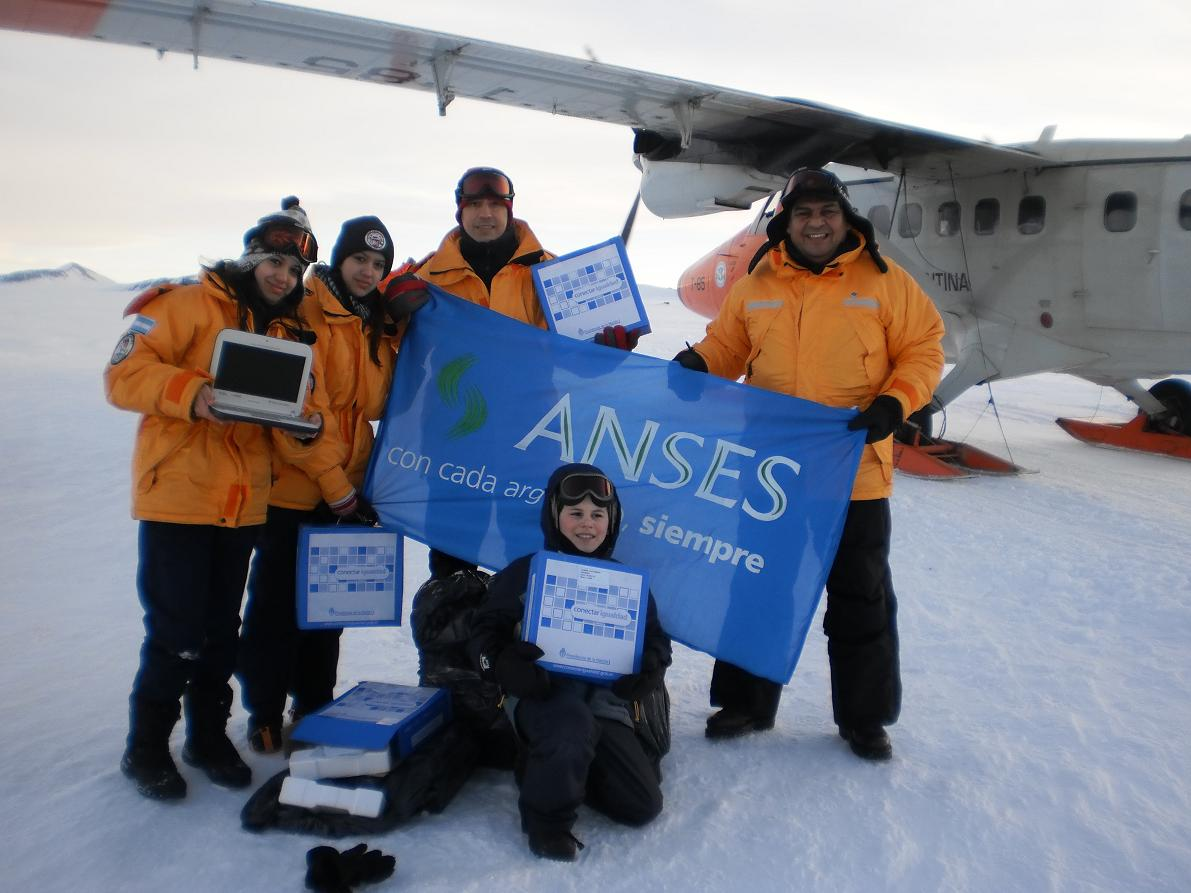
Children, adolescents and teachers of the school of Esperanza Base

Antarctica contains research stations and field camps that are staffed seasonally or year-round, and former whaling settlements. Approximately 12 nations, all signatory to the Antarctic Treaty, send personnel to perform seasonal (summer) or year-round research on the continent and in its surrounding oceans. There are also two official civilian settlements: Villa Las Estrellas in Base Presidente Eduardo Frei Montalva operated by Chile, and Fortín Sargento Cabral in Esperanza Base operated by Argentina.

The population of people doing and supporting scientific research on the continent and its nearby islands south of 60 degrees south latitude (the region covered by the Antarctic Treaty) varies from approximately 4,000 in summer to 1,000 in winter. In addition, approximately 1,000 personnel including ship's crew and scientists doing onboard research are present in the waters of the treaty region. The largest station, McMurdo Station, has a summer population of about 1,000 people and a winter population of about 200.

== Births ==
At least 11 children have been born in Antarctica. The first was Emilio Marcos Palma, born on 7 January 1978 to Argentine parents at Esperanza, Hope Bay, near the tip of the Antarctic peninsula. The first girl born on the Antarctic continent was Marisa De Las Nieves Delgado, born on 27 May 1978. The birth occurred at Fortín Sargento Cabral, Base Esperanza (Argentine Army).

James Kerguelen Robinson of Australia, born in the Kerguelen Islands on 11 March 1859, was the first person born in the Antarctic (the world region south of the Antarctic Convergence). The first human born and raised south of the Antarctic Convergence was the Norwegian Solveig Gunbjørg Jacobsen, born in the island territory of South Georgia on 8 October 1913.

List
Parents country	Name	Birthday	Sex	Place of birth
Argentina	Emilio Marcos Palma	January 7, 1978	M	Esperanza Base
Argentina	Marisa De Las Nieves Delgado	May 27, 1978	F	Esperanza Base
Argentina	Ruben Eduardo de Carli	September 21, 1979	M	Esperanza Base
Argentina	Francisco Javier Sosa	October 11, 1979	M	Esperanza Base
Argentina	Silvina Analia Arnouil	January 14, 1980	F	Esperanza Base
Argentina	Jose Manuel Valdares Solis	January 24, 1980	M	Esperanza Base
Argentina	Lucas Daniel Posse	February 4, 1980	M	Esperanza Base
Argentina	Maria sol Cosenza	May 3, 1983	F	Esperanza Base
Chile	Juan Pablo Camacho	November 21, 1984	M	Villa Las Estrellas, Eduardo Frei Montalva
Chile	Gisella Ester Cortés Rojas	December 2, 1984	F	Villa Las Estrellas, Eduardo Frei Montalva
Chile	Ignacio Alfonso Miranda Lagunas	January 23, 1985	M	Villa Las Estrellas, Eduardo Frei Montalva

== Languages ==
English, Spanish, and Russian are the most widely spoken languages spoken in Antarctica. Spanish is dominant among South American launchpads of Argentina and Chile for Antarctic voyages. While Spanish is spoken especially among Argentinian, Chilean, and other Spanish-speaking research stations, English is the most widely used language. This is due to the large representation of English-speaking countries and the fact that English has become the de facto language of scientific research in the region. Antarctic English, a distinct variety of the English language, has been found to be spoken by people living on Antarctica and the subantarctic islands.

== See also ==
- Brazilian Antarctica
- Villa Las Estrellas
- Argentine Antarctica
- Research stations in Antarctica
- List of Antarctic field camps
- List of Antarctic expeditions
- Colonization of Antarctica
- Religion in Antarctica
- Crime in Antarctica
