= Juan Pablo Camacho =

First person conceived on the Antarctic continent

Juan Pablo Camacho Martino (born 21 November 1984) is the first Chilean born in the Antarctic Region, the ninth person born south of the 60th parallel, and the first to be conceived on the continent. He was born in Villa Las Estrellas at the Presidente Eduardo Frei Montalva Base in King George Island.

His parents were sent there to conceive and give birth to a child in order to strengthen Chile's claim on Antarctica.

== Biography ==
Juan Pablo Camacho is the third son of Germán Camacho and Ana María Martíno, both Chilean citizens. His father was a surgeon and officer in the Chilean Air Force, and his mother also worked at the Antarctic base. He was born at 6:30 a.m. on November 21, 1984, in Villa Las Estrellas, a village located on President Eduardo Frei Montalva Base, King George Island. A medical team brought from Continental Chile was in charge of the intervention that produced the child, who weighed 3 kilos 700 grams and measured 50 centimeters, in a normal delivery. In case of an emergency, a Hercules plane was available. Juan Pablo was the first person to be conceived on the continent, unlike Argentine citizen Emilio Marcos Palma, who was the first person to be born in Antarctica, but his mother arrived pregnant from South America. On November 24, Augusto Pinochet granted him life insurance and funding for his studies in a ceremony at La Moneda Palace.

On January 23, 1986, he and his family were transferred to Santiago, Chile. He won the President of the Republic scholarship and studied medicine, a profession he practices today. His friends and colleagues nicknamed him "El Pingüino" (The Penguin).

== Other Antarctic Chileans ==
Gisella Cortés Rojas (born December 2, 1984) and Ignacio Miranda Lagunas (born January 23, 1985) were born on the same expedition. They do not know each other and have not returned to Antarctica. Miranda Lagunas is the last person so far to be born in Antarctica.

== See also ==
- Demographics of Antarctica
- Emilio Palma
