= Capitán Fuentes Martínez Airport =

Airport in Chile

- IATA: WPR; ICAO: SCFM

Summary
- Airport type: Public
- Serves: Porvenir, Chile
- Elevation AMSL: 104 ft (32 m)
- Coordinates: 53°15′10″S 70°19′25″W

Map
- Location of Capitán Fuentes Martínez Airport in Chile

Runways
Direction	Length		Surface
Direction	m	ft	Surface
03/21	960	3,150	Asphalt
09/27	2,505	8,219	Asphalt
- Source: GCM Google Maps SkyVector

Capitán Fuentes Martínez Airport (Spanish: Aeródromo Capitán Fuentes Martínez), (IATA: WPR, ICAO: SCFM) is an airport 5 kilometres (3.1 mi) northeast of Porvenir, a port city off the Strait of Magellan in the Magallanes Region of Chile.

East approach and departure are partially over the water.

== Airlines and destinations ==
Airlines	Destinations
Aerovías DAP	Punta Arenas

== See also ==
- Transport in Chile
- List of airports in Chile
