= Villa Las Estrellas =

Chilean village in the Antarctic

Villa Las Estrellas Villa Las Estrellas
- Village
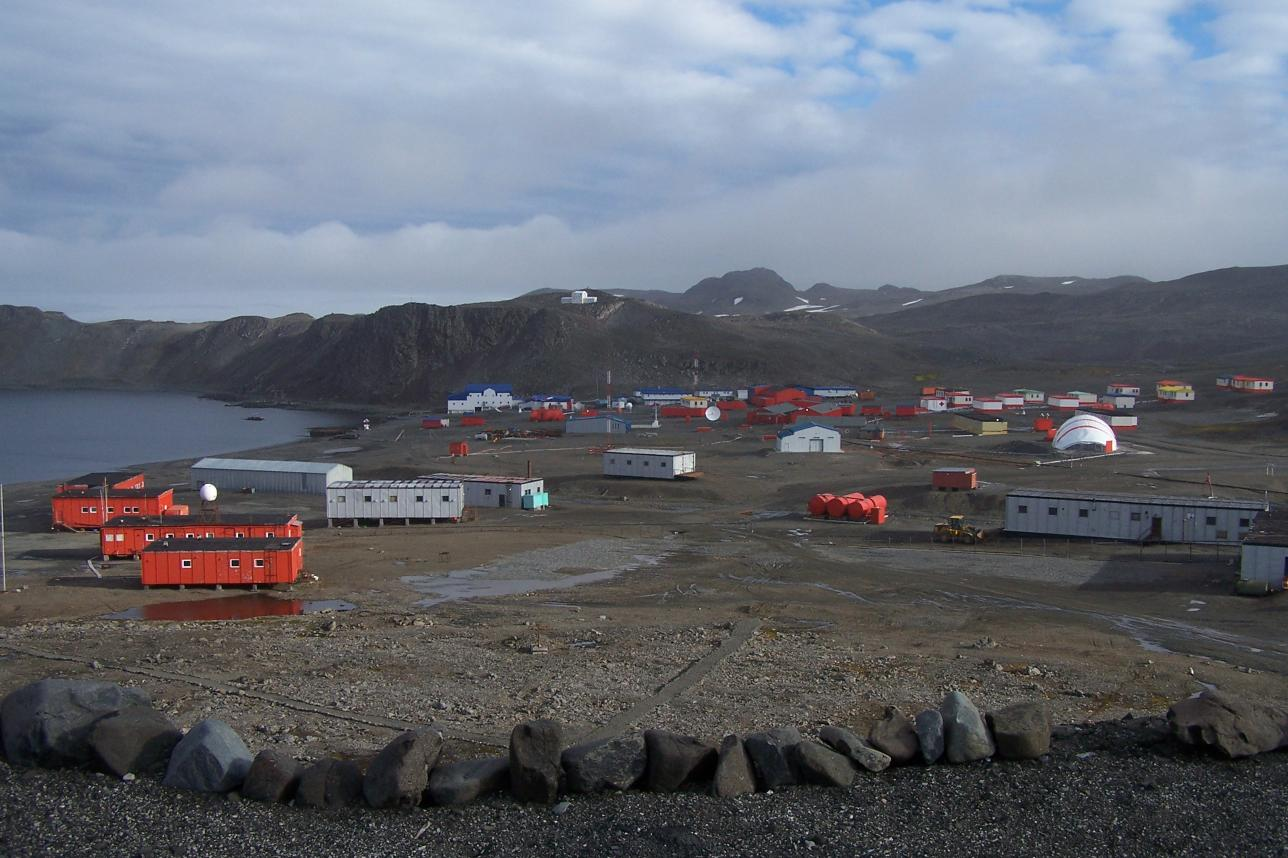
- Villa Las Estrellas in 2018

- Villa Las Estrellas within Antarctica
- Coordinates: 62°12′02″S 58°57′55″W
- Country: Chile
- Region: Magallanes y Antártica Chilena
- Province: Antártica Chilena
- Commune: Antártica
- Location: King George Island
- First Settled: February 15, 1984
- Founded: 9 April 1984

Government
  - Type: Municipality
  - Magistrate: Responsibility of Puerto Williams Mayor and de facto Base Commander
  - Municipal Council: Responsibility of Puerto Williams Council
- Elevation: 10 m (33 ft)

Population (2017)
  - Summer: 150
  - Winter: 80
- Time zone: UTC−3 (CLST)
- UN/LOCODE: AQ ESC
- Activities: Meteorology

Villa Las Estrellas (Spanish pronunciation: [ˈbi.ʝa las es.ˈtɾe.ʝas]; Spanish for The Stars Village or Hamlet of the Stars) is a permanently inhabited Antarctic outpost on King George Island within the Chilean Antarctic claim, the Chilean Antarctic Territory, and also within the Argentine and British Antarctic claims.

Located in the Piloto Pardo census district, the Chilean government considers the village as within the commune of Antártica, the province of Antártica Chilena, and the región of Magallanes and Chilean Antartica.

It is located on President Eduardo Frei Montalva Base, a research station. It is the larger one of only two civilian settlements on Antarctica (the other being Argentina's Esperanza Base). It has a summer population of 150 and a winter population of 80.

== History ==
First permanently-populated on 15 February, 1984, the village was officially founded on 9 April, 1984. The Villa Las Estrellas F-50 Antarctic School was inaugurated the same day. Over time additional services were inagurated, including a civil registry, post office, bank, library, church, pier and hospital.

Juan Pablo Camacho, born in the town in 1984, was the first Chilean born in Antarctic territory. In a ceremony at La Moneda on November 24, he was awarded with life insurance and financial support for his studies by Augusto Pinochet.

== Government ==
The Office of the Civil Registry and Identification Service of Chile acts as official registry office with all the responsibilities inherent in this position.

=== Post office ===
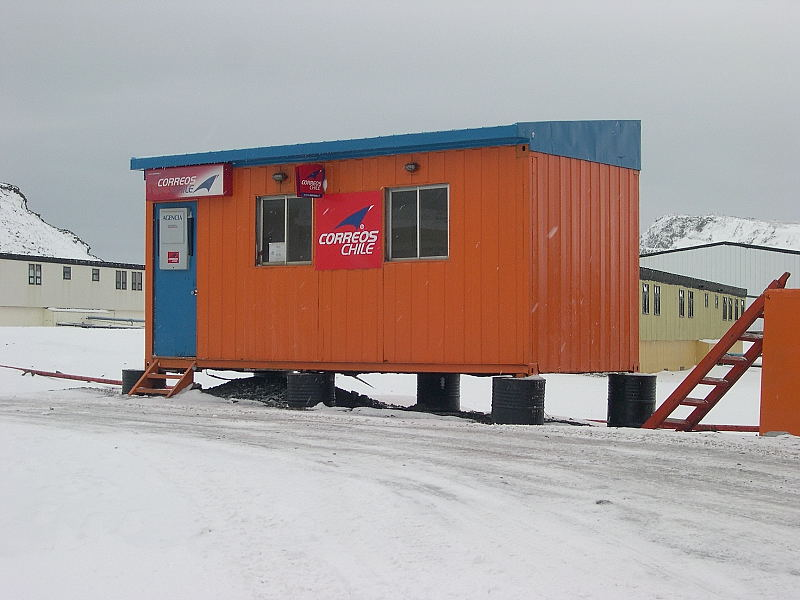
Chilean Post office in Villa Las Estrellas

There is a Correos de Chile post office staffed in the summer by a postal worker and by the command of the base in the winter. The office receives all its mail from Punta Arenas and serves as the primary mail depot and relay station for all mail addressed to any Chilean installation in Antarctica, in addition to some other foreign facilities; from here it is delivered by hand, plane, or helicopter. The post office is also an attraction for tourists and philately enthusiasts who travel to the town to send postcards and letters with an Antarctic postmark.

=== Education ===
F-50 "Villa Las Estrellas" School, a 1st–8th grade primary school staffed by two teachers that are responsible for providing education for the community's children, operated for 33 years until 2018, during which it educated over 300 children. As of 2014, there were six students. Library No. 291 has a collection of books and magazines that are available upon request.

=== Healthcare ===
There is a Chilean Air Force Hospital staffed with one doctor and nurse and equipped with X-ray, laboratory, surgery, anesthesia machine, sterilizer, and pharmacy services in addition to limited emergency and surgery capabilities. Two hospital beds are available in addition to a dental clinic. Through a partnership with the Chilean Antarctic Institute and the University of Chile, in emergencies, medical images can be outsourced to specialized health centers in South America and Europe for diagnosis.

As of 2018, all residents, including children, are required to have their appendixes removed before coming to Villa Las Estrellas as a safety precaution due to limited access to healthcare services.

== Community ==
The people of Villa Las Estrellas live in a community that has fourteen 90 m^{2} (970 sq ft) homes. Juan Pablo Camacho, the first Chilean born in the Antarctic region, was born at Villa Las Estrellas in November 1984.

=== Business and recreation ===
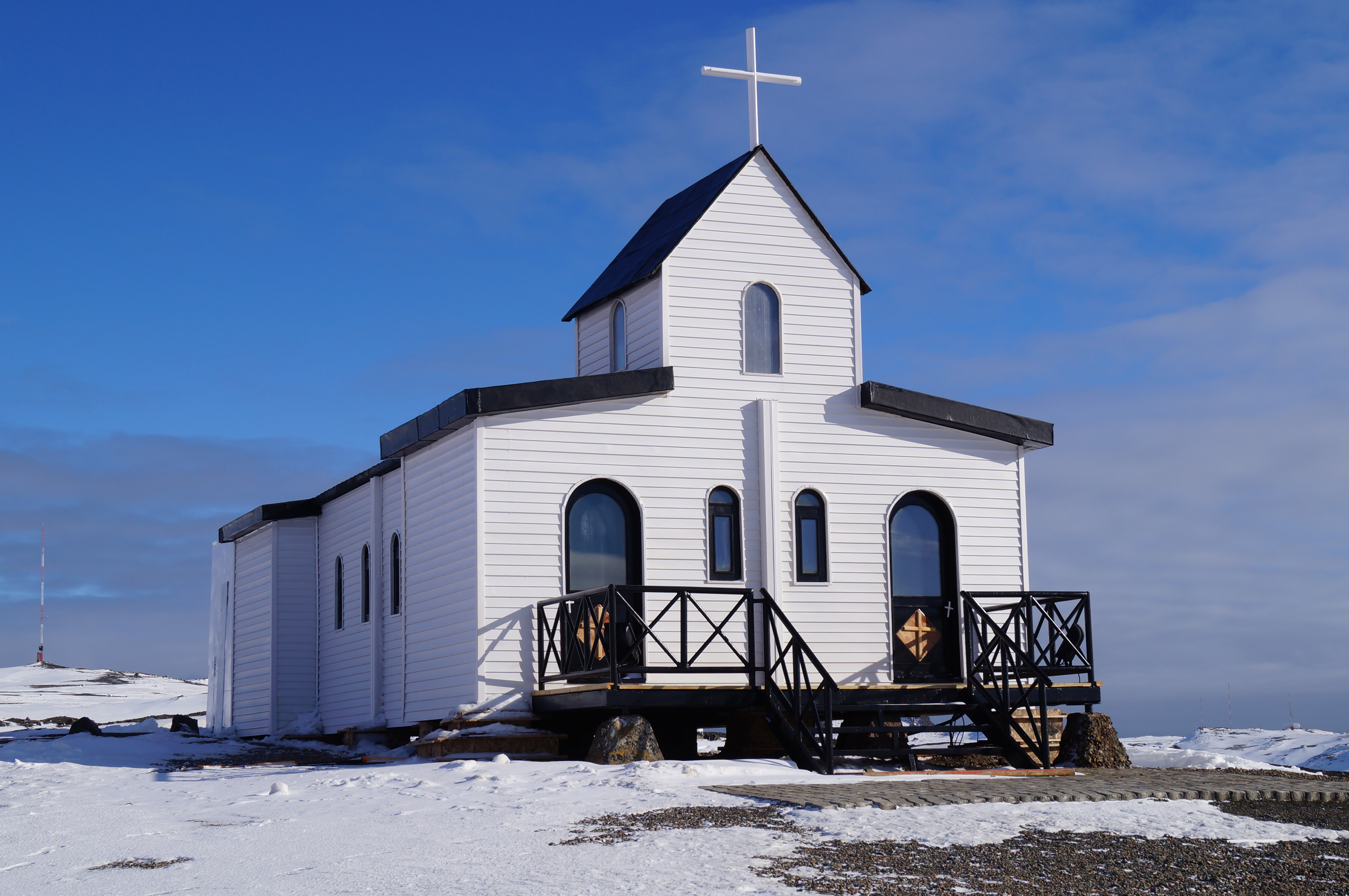
Chapel of St. Mary Queen of Peace

A Catholic chapel, Santa María Reina de la Paz (St. Mary Queen of Peace), acts as the primary place of worship, attracting people from across King George Island.

A branch of Banco de Crédito e Inversiones operates throughout the year staffed by a sole banker. A small souvenir shop in town is also present to serve tourists and staff, and is run by the women of the town.

A sports center acts as the main community hub, in which various physical activities occur, including tennis, babyfútbol, basketball and volleyball. Furthermore, there are exercise machines, ping pong tables, dressing rooms and a sauna available. It is also used for cultural activities and scientific talks, and has been used as a voting center for the residents.

From 1980 to 2019, there was a small hostel named Estrella Polar.

=== Communication ===
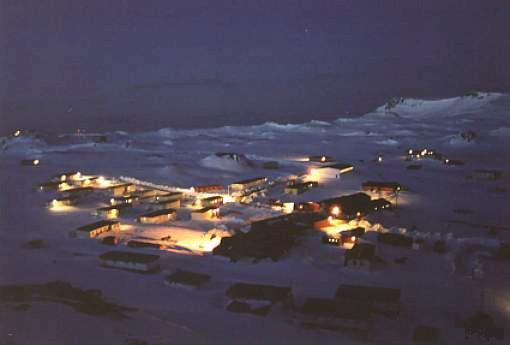
- Villa Las Estrellas, night view
  Telephones: Telephones for the base and their airfield operate via satellite telephone and, for the inhabitants of the sector, there is a coin-operated pay phone and prepaid cards.
- Internet: There are computers at the school that have internet access.
- Radio: Radio Soberanía (Sovereignty) broadcasts on the frequency of 90.5 MHz during the day, providing music and information to all the bases in the area. Certain cultural and entertainment programs made by staff and their families are also disseminated.
- Television: The town has a fixed dish of 2.5 meters in diameter, which allows reception of live signals from the main television channels in the country, broadcasting from Santiago. Residents can also receive two broadcast stations. These are Televisión Nacional and Universidad Católica Television.
- Mobile phone: Since 2005, there is an antenna belonging to the Chilean company Entel PCS.

== Transportation ==
The nearest airport is the Teniente R. Marsh Airport, the only airport in Antarctica that has an IATA code. There is no regular scheduled public service to the airport, although Aerovías DAP has some charter flights from Punta Arenas.

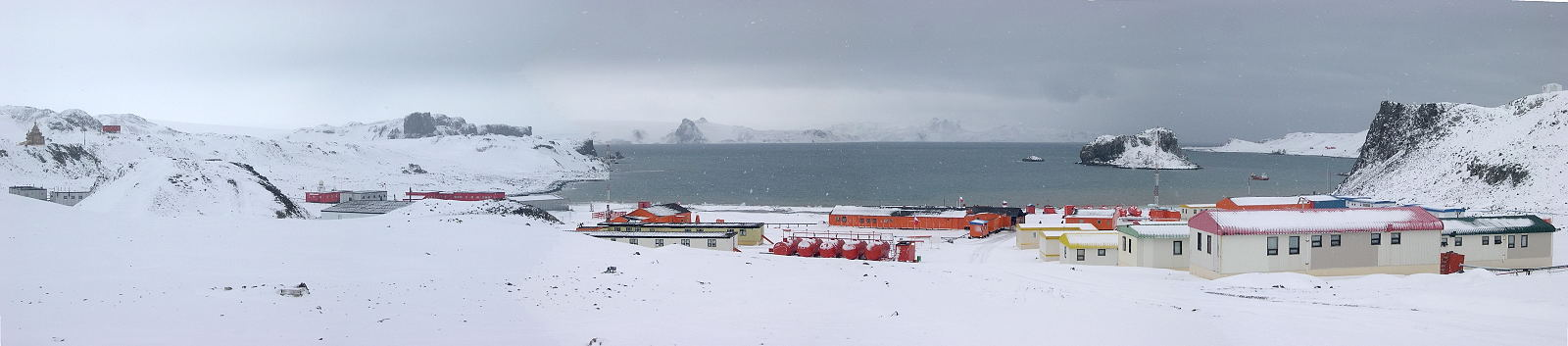
Villa Las Estrellas. View to the bay from the rear.

== Climate ==
Villa Las Estrellas has a marine tundra climate (Köppen: ET, Trewartha: Ftko). Winter temperatures are typically milder than other, comparably well-populated, arctic or near-polar regions (especially inland areas), such as parts of Alaska, Canada, Greenland, Iceland, Russia and Siberia, or northern Norway, Finland, or Sweden. However, the summertime conditions of the aforementioned locales are generally known to be muggy, warm, humid and wet, with millions of biting flies and mosquitoes swarming; by comparison, during the brief summer season, conditions in Villa Las Estrellas are considerably more tolerable and forgiving. However, during summer, the area is, in effect, just barely above freezing, which causes the climate to be hostile to the human inhabitants. Sunshine levels also become extremely low, leading to potential vitamin D deficiencies or depression. The yearly mean temperature of −2.3 °C (27.9 °F) is, still, quite gentle for the Antarctic, and milder than many places with vegetation.

Climate data for Villa Las Estrellas
Month	Jan	Feb	Mar	Apr	May	Jun	Jul	Aug	Sep	Oct	Nov	Dec	Year
Record high °C (°F)	13.0 (55.4)	9.2 (48.6)	8.3 (46.9)	5.9 (42.6)	4.6 (40.3)	4.2 (39.6)	5.0 (41.0)	3.8 (38.8)	4.4 (39.9)	4.4 (39.9)	6.0 (42.8)	8.2 (46.8)	13.0 (55.4)
Mean daily maximum °C (°F)	2.7 (36.9)	2.9 (37.2)	2.2 (36.0)	0.6 (33.1)	−0.8 (30.6)	−1.5 (29.3)	−0.9 (30.4)	−2.2 (28.0)	−1.3 (29.7)	−0.8 (30.6)	0.0 (32.0)	2.1 (35.8)	0.3 (32.5)
Daily mean °C (°F)	1.5 (34.7)	1.6 (34.9)	0.4 (32.7)	−1.7 (28.9)	−3.8 (25.2)	−5.5 (22.1)	−6.5 (20.3)	−6.5 (20.3)	−4.5 (23.9)	−2.6 (27.3)	−1.0 (30.2)	0.6 (33.1)	−2.3 (27.9)
Mean daily minimum °C (°F)	0.3 (32.5)	0.6 (33.1)	−1.2 (29.8)	−4.8 (23.4)	−8.2 (17.2)	−9.4 (15.1)	−13.2 (8.2)	−11.3 (11.7)	−8.0 (17.6)	−5.6 (21.9)	−2.8 (27.0)	−0.3 (31.5)	−5.3 (22.5)
Record low °C (°F)	−5.1 (22.8)	−5.8 (21.6)	−9.9 (14.2)	−16.8 (1.8)	−23.6 (−10.5)	−24.2 (−11.6)	−28.5 (−19.3)	−28.7 (−19.7)	−23.0 (−9.4)	−17.0 (1.4)	−10.7 (12.7)	−6.8 (19.8)	−28.7 (−19.7)
Average precipitation mm (inches)	53.8 (2.12)	52.3 (2.06)	52.5 (2.07)	46.6 (1.83)	31.0 (1.22)	29.2 (1.15)	32.2 (1.27)	34.5 (1.36)	42.0 (1.65)	47.7 (1.88)	41.0 (1.61)	30.1 (1.19)	492.9 (19.41)
Average relative humidity (%)	91	89	89	89	88	90	89	88	89	90	89	81	89
Mean monthly sunshine hours	83.8	71.2	57.3	23.6	8.3	1.2	3.9	15.8	44.2	93.2	104.5	98.1	605.1
Source: Dirección Meteorológica de Chile (temperature data:1970-2004, all other 1990-2000)

== See also ==
- List of Antarctic research stations
- List of Antarctic field camps
- Puerto Toro
- Puerto Williams
- Chilean Antarctic Territory
- Antártica Chilena Province
- Antártica (Commune)
