= Emilio Palma =

First person born on the Antarctic mainland

- Born: Emilio Marcos Palma; 7 January 1978 (age 48); Esperanza Base, Trinity Peninsula, Antarctica (Note: This area was and is still disputed between the Argentine Antarctic Territory, British Antarctic Territory and Chilean Antarctic Territory.)
- Citizenship: Argentina, United Kingdom
- Known for: Being the first human born on the Antarctic mainland
- Relatives: Jorge Emilio Palma (father); Silvia Morella de Palma (mother)

Emilio Marcos Palma (Spanish pronunciation: [eˈmiljo ˈmaɾkos ˈpalma]; born 7 January 1978) is an Argentine man who was the first person born on the continent Antarctica. The first person to be conceived in the continent was Juan Pablo Camacho.

== Biography ==
Palma was born in Fortín Sargento Cabral at the Esperanza Base, near the tip of the Antarctic Peninsula, and weighed 3.4 kg (7 lb 8 oz). His father, Captain Jorge Emilio Palma, was head of the Argentine Army detachment at the base.

In late 1977, Silvia Morella de Palma, who was then seven months pregnant, was airlifted to Esperanza Base, in order to complete her pregnancy in the base. Emilio Palma was born on 7 January 1978 and baptized at the Chapel of St. Francis of Assisi on the base. As he was born before 1983 in land claimed by the United Kingdom, he had British citizenship at birth.

He is featured in the Guinness Book of Records as the first person born on the continent.

== See also ==
- Demographics of Antarctica
- Solveig Gunbjørg Jacobsen
