= Base Presidente Eduardo Frei Montalva =

- Antarctic base
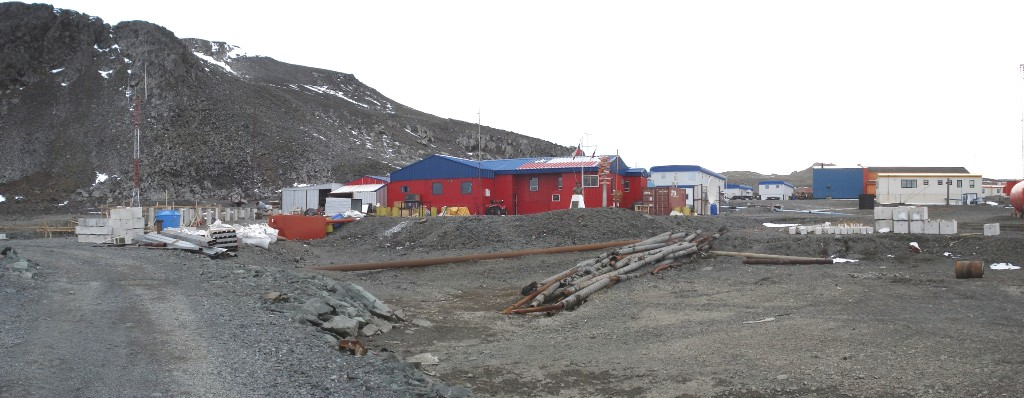
- Chilean Eduardo Frei Montalva Station

- Location on King George Island

- Location in Antarctica
- Coordinates: 62°12′01″S 58°57′45″W
- Country: Chile
- Region: Magallanes y Antártica Chilena
- Province: Antártica Chilena
- Commune: Antártica
- Location in Antarctica: King George Island
- Operator: Chilean Air Force
- Established: 7 March 1969; 57 years ago
- Elevation: 10 m (33 ft)
- Time zone: UTC−3 (CLST)
- UN/LOCODE: AQ ESC
- Active times: All year-round
- Status: Operational

Ardley Cove lighthouse
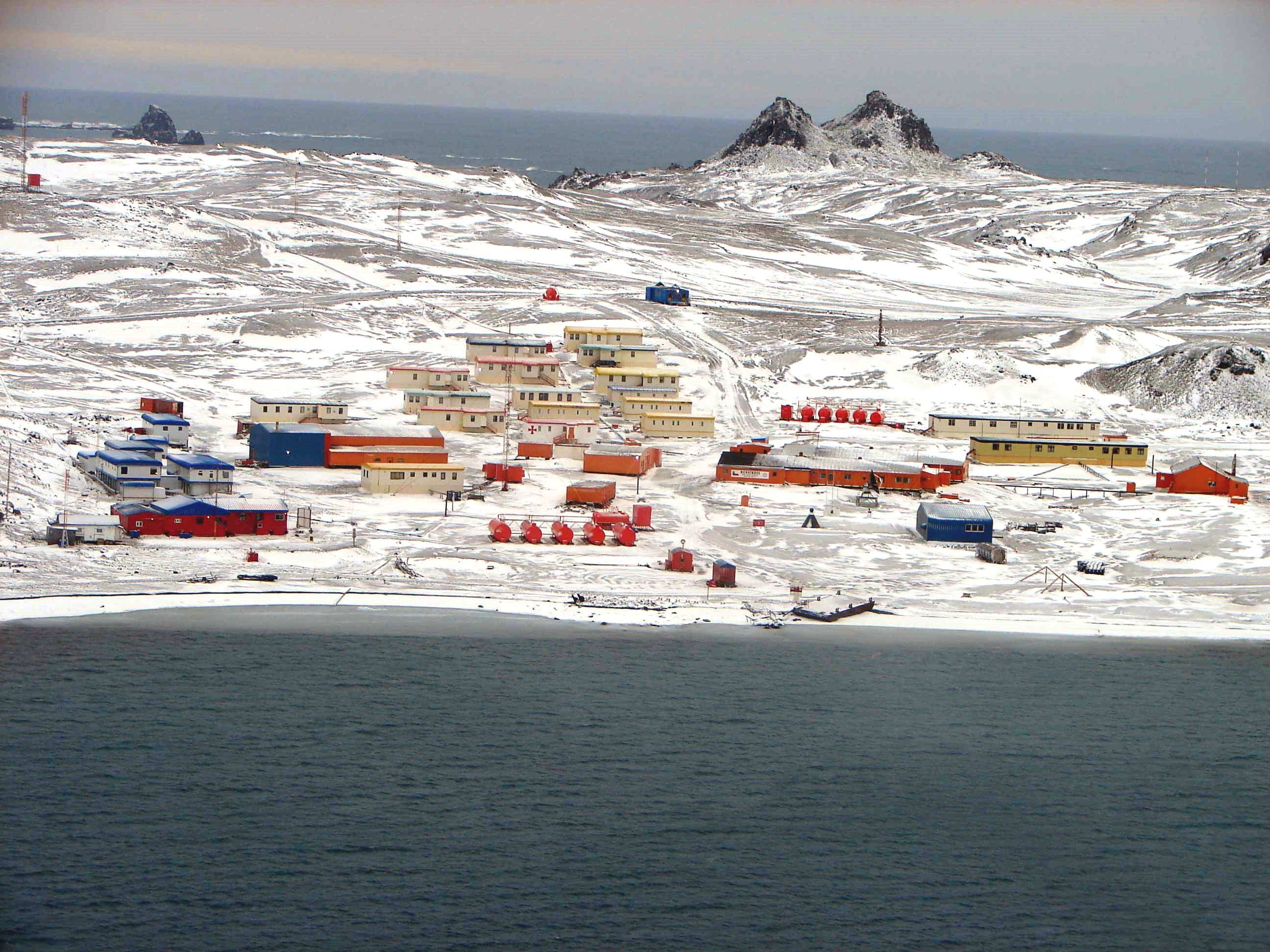
- Location: Ardley Island, King George Island, Chile
- Coordinates: 62°12′03″S 58°57′37″W

Tower
- Foundation: concrete base
- Construction: fiberglass tower
- Height: 3 metres (9.8 ft)
- Shape: cylindrical tower with side panels
- Markings: white tower and panels with red horizontal band
- Power source: solar power

Light
- Focal height: 5 metres (16 ft)
- Range: 6 nautical miles (11 km; 6.9 mi)
- Characteristic: Fl W 5s.

Base Presidente Eduardo Frei Montalva is the most important Antarctic base of Chile. It is located at Fildes Peninsula, an ice-free area, in front of Fildes Bay, at the west end of King George Island, South Shetland Islands. Situated alongside the Escudero Station in Villa Las Estrellas and only 200 metres (660 ft) from the Russian Bellingshausen Station, it is at an altitude of 10 metres (33 ft) above sea level. The base is located in the Chilean commune of Antártica, which is the Antarctic territory claimed by Chile (Antártica Chilena Province, Magallanes y la Antártica Chilena Region).

Also nearby are the bases of Great Wall (China), General Artigas Station (Uruguay), King Sejong Station (Republic of Korea), Carlini Base (Argentina), Commandante Ferraz (Brazil), Henryk Arctowski (Poland) and Machu Picchu Base (Peru). Further away is Captain Arturo Prat Base, also Chilean, 50 km to the west.

== Description ==
It has a 1,300-metre (4,300 ft)-long airstrip (Teniente Rodolfo Marsh Martin Aerodrome, ICAO Code SCRM), with 50 intercontinental and 150 intracontinental flights each season, serving as a means of transport to many nearby bases. It also includes the Villa Las Estrellas residential area that has a hospital, a school, a bank, a small supermarket, etc. The maximum population during summer is of 150 people, and the average during winter is about 80 people.

It began to operate in 1969 as Centro Meteorológico Eduardo Frei. When the installations were expanded, it was renamed as Base Teniente Rodolfo Marsh, with the meteorology center keeping its original name. During the 1990s, all of the installations came to be named Base Presidente Eduardo Frei Montalva, with the airstrip retaining the name Teniente Rodolfo Marsh.

== Climate ==
Like the coastal areas of Antarctic Peninsula and the subantarctic islands south of the 60º parallel, the area has a tundra climate, that could be considerably borderline "maritime-influenced polar climate", thanks to temperatures that rarely drop below −15 °C (5 °F) in winter (which is commonplace in most of Antarctica), and temperatures that could soar a few digits above freezing for most parts of the year. The base's area and its vicinity (the entire island, actually) experiences a rather heavy precipitation, with an average precipitation rate of 405 millimetres (15.9 in) yearly, which makes it unusual on the Antarctic continent, as the continent is significantly drier than the islands are to the north.

Climate data for Base Frei (1991–2020, extremes 1970–present)
Month	Jan	Feb	Mar	Apr	May	Jun	Jul	Aug	Sep	Oct	Nov	Dec	Year
Record high °C (°F)	11.0 (51.8)	9.2 (48.6)	8.4 (47.1)	6.5 (43.7)	4.9 (40.8)	4.2 (39.6)	3.4 (38.1)	5.1 (41.2)	3.9 (39.0)	4.4 (39.9)	6.0 (42.8)	8.2 (46.8)	11.0 (51.8)
Mean daily maximum °C (°F)	2.6 (36.7)	2.6 (36.7)	1.5 (34.7)	−0.4 (31.3)	−1.8 (28.8)	−3.8 (25.2)	−4.3 (24.3)	−4.1 (24.6)	−2.9 (26.8)	−1.5 (29.3)	−0.1 (31.8)	1.3 (34.3)	−0.9 (30.4)
Daily mean °C (°F)	1.4 (34.5)	1.4 (34.5)	0.3 (32.5)	−1.6 (29.1)	−3.1 (26.4)	−5.3 (22.5)	−6.0 (21.2)	−5.7 (21.7)	−4.4 (24.1)	−2.8 (27.0)	−1.2 (29.8)	0.2 (32.4)	−2.3 (27.9)
Mean daily minimum °C (°F)	0.2 (32.4)	0.2 (32.4)	−0.8 (30.6)	−2.7 (27.1)	−4.4 (24.1)	−6.8 (19.8)	−7.7 (18.1)	−7.4 (18.7)	−6.0 (21.2)	−4.0 (24.8)	−2.3 (27.9)	−0.9 (30.4)	−3.5 (25.7)
Record low °C (°F)	−5.1 (22.8)	−6.6 (20.1)	−9.9 (14.2)	−15.7 (3.7)	−23.6 (−10.5)	−24.2 (−11.6)	−28.5 (−19.3)	−28.7 (−19.7)	−23.0 (−9.4)	−16.0 (3.2)	−10.7 (12.7)	−6.8 (19.8)	−28.7 (−19.7)
Average precipitation mm (inches)	43.6 (1.72)	48.9 (1.93)	54.2 (2.13)	44.8 (1.76)	42.5 (1.67)	49.2 (1.94)	47.3 (1.86)	51.4 (2.02)	57.0 (2.24)	61.2 (2.41)	42.5 (1.67)	31.9 (1.26)	574.5 (22.62)
Average precipitation days (≥ 1.0 mm)	11.4	11.7	13.6	11.8	11.3	10.5	10.6	11.3	11.7	13.0	12.4	9.9	139.1
Average relative humidity (%)	90.2	89.7	89.3	89.1	89.0	88.5	89.1	89.1	89.7	89.8	89.9	89.1	89.4
Mean monthly sunshine hours	76.9	62.1	48.2	24.3	10.3	3.6	7.8	20.1	38.3	74.1	84.7	91.0	522.6
Source 1: Dirección Meteorológica de Chile
Source 2: NOAA (precipitation days 1991–2020)

== See also ==
- List of lighthouses in Antarctica
- Research stations in Antarctica
- List of Antarctic field camps
