= Antártica =

- Commune
- Coat of arms

- Country: Chile
- Region: (Magallanes y la Antártica Chilena Region) Magallanes Region
- Province: Antártica Chilena
- Foundation: 11 July 1961

Government
  - Mayor of Cabo de Hornos: Patricio Fernández (DC)

Area
  - Total: 1,250,257.6 km^{2} (482,727.2 sq mi)

Population (2002 Census)
  - Total: 127
  - Density: 9×10^{−05}/km^{2} (2.3×10^{−4}/sq mi)
- Demonym(s): Antarctic (Antártico, -a)

Antártica is a Chilean commune in Antártica Chilena Province, Magallanes y la Antártica Chilena Region, which covers all the Chilean Antarctic Territory (the territory in Antarctica claimed by Chile). It ranges from 53°W to 90°W and from the South Pole to 60°S, overlapping the Argentine and British Antarctic claims, and is the largest and least populated commune in Chile, being over 25 times the size of the next largest commune, Natales. It is administered by the Cabo de Hornos municipality in the South American mainland.

Antártica was created on 11 July 1961, and was dependent on the Magallanes Province until 1975, when the Antártica Chilena Province was created, making it dependent administratively on Puerto Williams, the province capital.

== Demographics ==
Historical population
Year	Pop.	±% p.a.
1952	87	—
1970	53	−2.72%
1982	59	+0.90%
1992	131	+8.30%
2002	130	−0.08%
2017	138	+0.40%
2024	60	−11.22%
Source: "Censo de Población y Vivienda". National Statistics Institute.

According to the 2002 census of the National Statistics Institute, Antártica spans an area of 1,250,000 km^{2} (482,628 sq mi) and has 130 inhabitants (115 men and 15 women), making the commune an entirely rural area. The population fell by 11.5% (15 people) between the 2002 and 2012 censuses. This does not include the staff of non-Chilean bases in the area.

=== Census districts ===
The commune consists of two census districts:

- Piloto Pardo (pop. 114), consisting of the South Shetland Islands and named after Luis Pardo, with the only civil settlement, Villa Las Estrellas.
- Tierra de O'Higgins (the Antarctic mainland) (pop. 16), with communal capital Puerto Covadonga (O'Higgins Station).

== Administration ==
The commune is governed from Puerto Williams in the Cabo de Hornos commune from its municipal office located at O'Higgins 165. Chilean law allows a municipality to govern more than one commune, however, this is the only such case. As a commune, Antártica is a third-level administrative division of Chile administered by a municipal council, headed by an alcalde who is directly elected every four years. The 2016-2020 alcalde is Patricio Fernández (DC). The communal council has the following members:

Daniel Fernando Valdebenito Contreras (PS) Ángela Barría Barrientos (RN) Juan Velásquez (PS) Carolina Guenel González (DC) Francis Delgado Ibaceta (RN) Paola Speake Ojeda (DC)

Within the electoral divisions of Chile, Antártica is represented in the Chamber of Deputies by Juan Morano (PDC) and Gabriel Boric (Ind.) as part of the 60th electoral district, which includes the entire Magallanes y la Antártica Chilena Region. The commune is represented in the Senate by Carlos Bianchi Chelech (Ind.) and Carolina Goic (PDC) as part of the 19th senatorial constituency (Magallanes y la Antártica Chilena Region).

== See also ==
- Chilean Antarctic Territory
- Antártica Chilena Province
- Magallanes y la Antártica Chilena Region
- Punta Arenas
- Territorial claims in Antarctica
- Argentine Antarctica and Tierra del Fuego Province
- British Antarctic Territory
- Antarctic Treaty System
- Antarctic Peninsula
- Diego Ramirez Islands
