= Esperanza Base =

Esperanza Base Base Esperanza
- All year Antarctic base with civilian presence
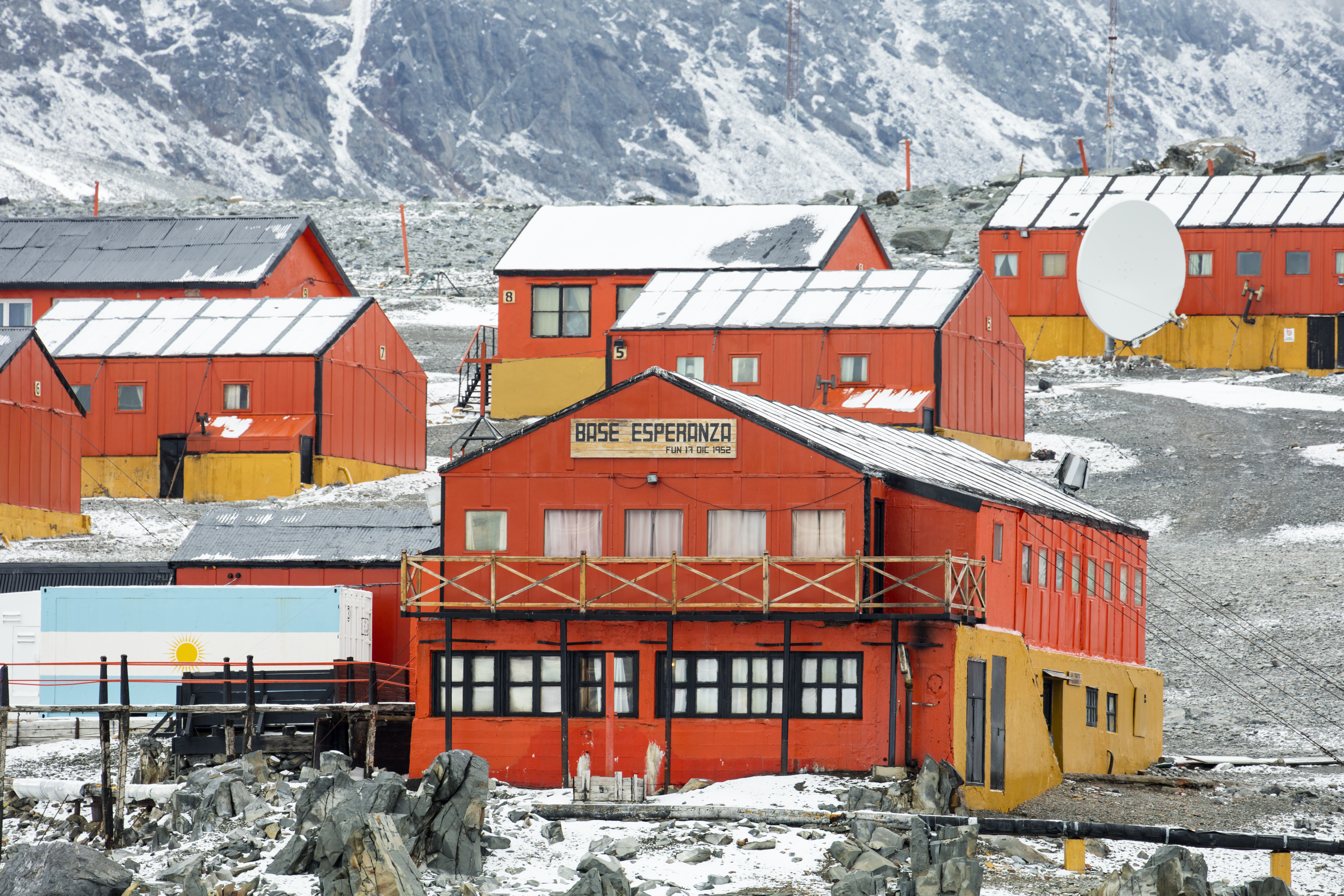
- Esperanza Base, January 2016

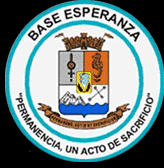
- Emblem
- Motto: Spanish: Permanencia, un acto de sacrificio ("Permanence, an act of sacrifice")
- Location of Esperanza Base in Antarctica
- Coordinates: 63°23′54″S 56°59′46″W
- Country: Argentina
- Region: Graham Land; Antarctic Peninsula
- Location: Hope Bay; Trinity Peninsula
- Administered by: Argentine Antarctic Institute (under the supervision of the Argentine National Antarctic Directorate)
- Established: December 17, 1953
- Named for: Spanish: Base Esperanza ("Hope Base")

Area
  - Urban (Note: Indoors area): 0.3744 ha (0.925 acres)
- Elevation: 25 m (82 ft)

Population (2017)
  - Summer: 116
  - Winter: 56
- UN/LOCODE: AQ ESP
- Type: All-year round
- Period: Annual
- Status: Operational
- Activities: List: Limnology; Glaciology; Seismology; Oceanography; Geology

Esperanza Base (Spanish: Base Esperanza, 'Hope Base') is a permanent, all-year-round Argentine research station in Hope Bay, Trinity Peninsula (in Graham Land on the Antarctic Peninsula). It is the only civilian settlement on the Antarctic mainland (the Chilean Villa Las Estrellas is on the South Shetland Islands). The base's motto is Permanencia, un acto de sacrificio ('Permanence, an act of sacrifice').

== Description ==
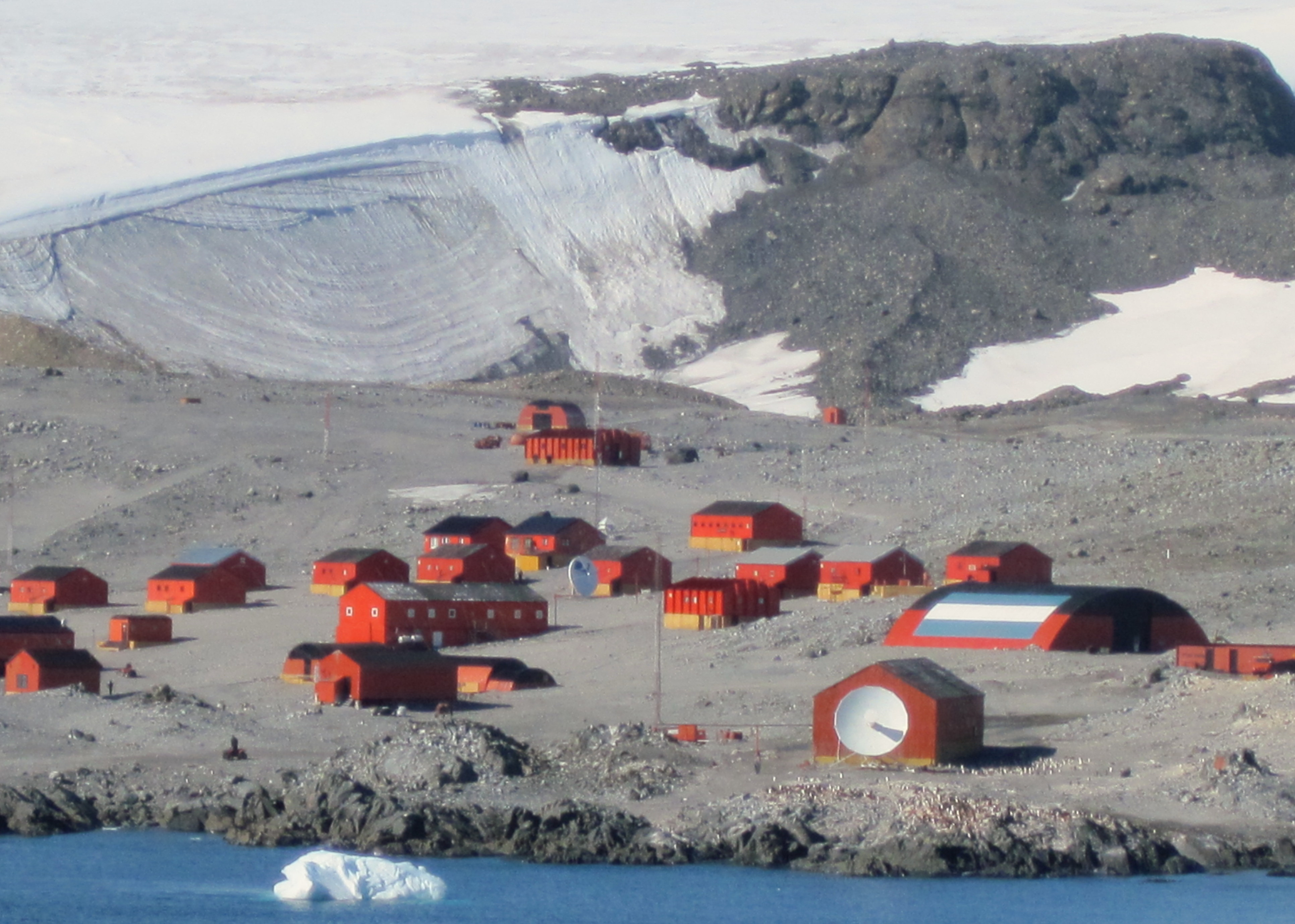
Esperanza in January 2012

Built in 1953, the base houses 56 inhabitants in winter, including 10 families and 2 school teachers. Provincial school #38 Presidente Raúl Ricardo Alfonsín (formerly named Julio Argentino Roca) was founded in 1978 and acquired independent status in 1997. It maintains the furthest South Scout troop. The base has an Argentine civil register office where births and weddings are recorded. The base has tourist facilities that are visited by about 1,100 tourists each year.

The LRA 36 Radio Nacional Arcángel San Gabriel radio station started transmitting in 1979 and currently broadcasts on 15476 kHz shortwave and 96.7 MHz FM. It is one of the southernmost radio stations in the world and its range signal includes audio identification in multiple languages. The host of "Panorama Nacional" Marcelo Ayala told at the beginning of 2024 about his life experience and broadcast by LRA36 Radio Nacional Arcángel San Gabriel.

A wind generator was installed in 2008, mounted by INVAP.

The 43 buildings of the station have a combined space of 3,744 square metres (40,300 sq ft) covered; 18,000 litres (4,800 US gal) of fuel are used annually by the four generators to produce electricity for the station. Research projects include: glaciology, seismology, oceanography, coastal ecology, biology, geology, and limnology.

In the Hope Bay incident in 1952, this area was also the scene of the only shots fired in anger in Antarctica, when an Argentine shore party fired a machine gun over the heads of a Falkland Islands Dependencies Survey team unloading supplies from the John Biscoe to rebuild its damaged base. Following the Argentine show of force, the British team returned to the Falkland Islands. Shortly afterwards, Argentina issued a diplomatic apology, saying there had been a misunderstanding and the military commander on the ground had exceeded his authority. Despite this initial outward show of deference, the party was later welcomed back to Argentina with a hero's welcome. In the meantime, the John Biscoe had returned from the Falklands with a military escort and completed rebuilding the British base. The Antarctic Treaty of 1959 now treats the continent as a laboratory open to all, and provides that "no acts or activities ... shall constitute a basis for asserting, supporting or denying a claim to territorial sovereignty."

== People ==
In 1978 the base was the birthplace of Emilio Palma, the first person to be born in Antarctica. There have been at least ten other children born at the base. As of 2010, the following other people were named by the Argentine Army as having been born at the base:

- Marisa de las Nieves Delgado (1978), the first girl born in Antarctica
- Rubén Eduardo de Carli (1979)
- Francisco Javier Sosa (1979)
- Silvia Analía Arnouil (1980)
- José Manuel Valladares Solís (1980)
- Lucas Daniel Posse (1980)
- María Sol Cosenza (1983)

== Climate ==
Like the rest of the Antarctic Peninsula, Esperanza Base has a tundra climate (Köppen: ET, Trewartha: Ftkc) characterized by strong winds that descend downwards from the Antarctic ice sheet. These winds can exceed 250 km/h (160 mph), leading to blowing snow and reduced visibility.

Mean monthly temperatures range from −10.8 °C (12.6 °F) in July, the coldest month, to 1.5 °C (34.7 °F) in January, the warmest month. During summer (December–February), the average high is between 3.8 and 4.3 °C (38.8 and 39.7 °F) while the average low is between −2.0 and −1.2 °C (28.4 and 29.8 °F). In winter, mean temperatures are around −10.2 °C (13.6 °F). A temperature of 17.5 °C (63.5 °F) was recorded on 24 March 2015. This reading was the highest temperature ever recorded on mainland Antarctica and its surrounding islands, until on 6 February 2020, a new high of 18.3 °C (64.9 °F) was recorded at the base, being the current record and considered by the World Meteorological Organization to be the highest temperature ever recorded for mainland Antarctica and its surrounding islands. The lowest temperature ever recorded is −38.4 °C (−37.1 °F) on 18 July 1994.

The temperature trend since 1948 is +0.0315 °C/yr (+0.0567 °F/yr) (annual), +0.0413 °C/yr (+0.0743 °F/yr) (winter) and +0.0300 °C/yr (+0.0540 °F/yr) (summer).

Climate data for Esperanza (1991–2020, extremes 1945–present)
Month	Jan	Feb	Mar	Apr	May	Jun	Jul	Aug	Sep	Oct	Nov	Dec	Year
Record high °C (°F)	14.9 (58.8)	18.3 (64.9)	17.5 (63.5)	17.1 (62.8)	17.2 (63.0)	15.4 (59.7)	14.0 (57.2)	13.0 (55.4)	11.4 (52.5)	17.0 (62.6)	14.3 (57.7)	14.6 (58.3)	18.3 (64.9)
Mean daily maximum °C (°F)	4.3 (39.7)	3.9 (39.0)	1.4 (34.5)	−1.7 (28.9)	−3.2 (26.2)	−6.2 (20.8)	−6.4 (20.5)	−5.1 (22.8)	−2.6 (27.3)	−0.2 (31.6)	2.3 (36.1)	3.8 (38.8)	−0.8 (30.6)
Daily mean °C (°F)	1.5 (34.7)	0.9 (33.6)	−2.0 (28.4)	−5.5 (22.1)	−7.4 (18.7)	−10.4 (13.3)	−10.8 (12.6)	−9.5 (14.9)	−6.9 (19.6)	−4.1 (24.6)	−0.9 (30.4)	0.8 (33.4)	−4.5 (23.9)
Mean daily minimum °C (°F)	−1.2 (29.8)	−2.0 (28.4)	−5.2 (22.6)	−8.9 (16.0)	−11.2 (11.8)	−14.1 (6.6)	−15.0 (5.0)	−13.7 (7.3)	−10.9 (12.4)	−7.8 (18.0)	−3.9 (25.0)	−1.8 (28.8)	−8.0 (17.6)
Record low °C (°F)	−8.5 (16.7)	−13.2 (8.2)	−20.9 (−5.6)	−26.0 (−14.8)	−29.6 (−21.3)	−30.0 (−22.0)	−38.4 (−37.1)	−32.0 (−25.6)	−32.6 (−26.7)	−23.2 (−9.8)	−18.0 (−0.4)	−9.7 (14.5)	−38.4 (−37.1)
Average precipitation mm (inches)	56.2 (2.21)	65.0 (2.56)	75.5 (2.97)	59.1 (2.33)	54.4 (2.14)	47.4 (1.87)	54.1 (2.13)	72.1 (2.84)	62.2 (2.45)	56.4 (2.22)	65.0 (2.56)	59.0 (2.32)	726.4 (28.60)
Average precipitation days (≥ 0.1 mm)	14	14	17	17	14	11	13	15	15	15	16	16	177
Average snowy days	13.6	12.1	14.8	16.0	15.4	14.8	15.2	15.4	15.1	16.6	15.5	14.1	178.6
Average relative humidity (%)	82	80	80	80	80	79	80	80	79	80	81	80	80
Mean monthly sunshine hours	167.4	130.0	93.0	63.0	27.9	6.0	18.6	52.7	87.0	130.2	159.0	186.0	1,120.8
Mean daily sunshine hours	5.4	4.6	3.0	2.1	0.9	0.2	0.6	1.7	2.9	4.2	5.3	6.0	3.1
Source 1: Servicio Meteorológico Nacional (temperature/snowy days/sun 1991–2020, precipitation 1961–1990), NOAA (precipitation 1961–1990)
Source 2: Meteo Climat (record highs and lows), Deutscher Wetterdienst (humidity, 1982–1995)(June maximum temperature record)

== Historic site ==
Grunden Rock Lighthouse
- Location: Grunden Rock, Esperanza Base, Antarctic Treaty area, Trinity Peninsula, Antarctica
- Coordinates: 63°24′S 57°00′W

Tower
- Constructed: 1952
- Construction: glass fiber (tower), concrete (foundation)
- Automated: 1994
- Height: 6 m (20 ft)
- Shape: cylinder
- Markings: Red (tower), Stripe (2, black, horizontal orientation)
- Power source: solar power
- Operator: Argentine Navy

Light
- First lit: 1994
- Focal height: 26 m (85 ft)
- Range: 8.9 nmi (16.5 km; 10.2 mi), 6 nmi (11 km; 6.9 mi)
- Characteristic: Fl W 2s

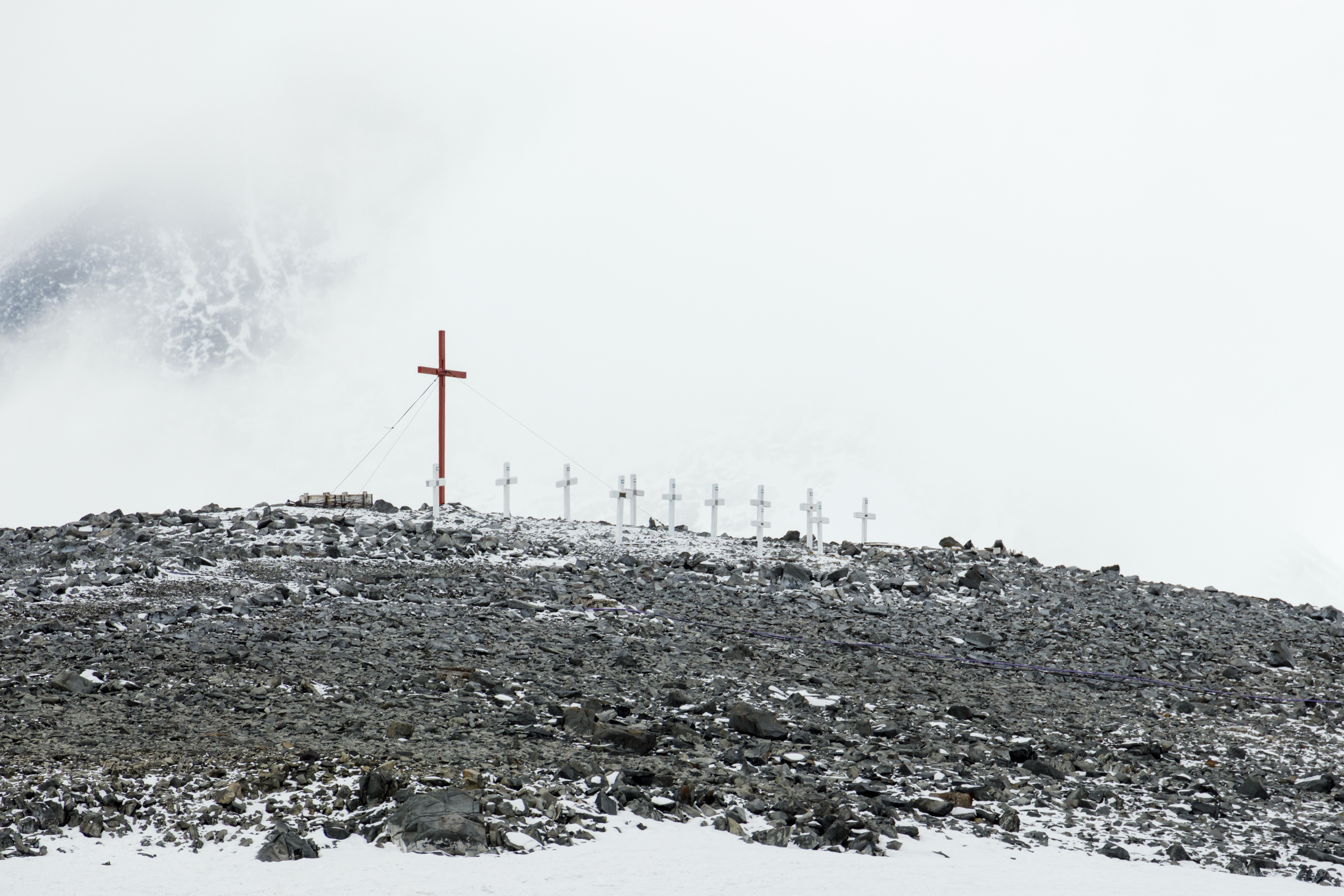
Cemetery at Esperanza Station

A group of items or structures of historic significance at, or close to, the base have been designated a Historic Site or Monument (HSM 40), following a proposal by Argentina to the Antarctic Treaty Consultative Meeting. These comprise a bust of General San Martin, a grotto with a statue of the Virgin of Lujan, a flagpole erected in 1955, and a cemetery with a stele commemorating Argentine expedition members who died in the area.

== General Martín Güemes Refuge ==
Refuge General Martín Güemes is the name given to two shelters in Antarctica. The first one is covered by ice, while the second one is active. The refuge is Administered by the Argentine Army and depends on Esperanza Base, which is responsible for maintenance and care. The two refuges are located on the Tabarin Peninsula on the eastern tip of the Trinity Peninsula on the Antarctic Peninsula 14 kilometres (8.7 mi) south of Esperanza. The refuges pay homage to Martín Miguel de Güemes, a military man who served an outstanding role in the Argentine war of independence.

=== General Martín Güemes I Refuge ===
The first refuge 63°29′00″S 57°00′00″W was located on the north east coast of the Duse Bay of the Trinity Peninsula and opened on October 23, 1953. Jorge Edgar Leal, at that time head of the newly created Esperanza Base, participated in its construction, being one of the first refuges installed by the Army and the second in the continental Antarctica. The refuge was destroyed by the ice in 1960.

=== General Martín Güemes II Refuge ===
The second refuge 63°30′14″S 57°07′25″W is active and is located in the Tabarin Peninsula and was inaugurated on September 15, 1959. It has capacity for six people, food for a month, fuel, gas and a first aid kit.

== See also ==
- Argentine Antarctica
- Hope Bay incident
- List of lighthouses in Antarctica
- List of Antarctic research stations
- List of Antarctic field camps
