= U71 =

U71 may refer to:

- German submarine U-71, various vessels
- Great icosihemidodecahedron
- HMS Sparrow (U71), a sloop of the Royal Navy
- Small nucleolar RNA SNORA71
- U71, a line of the Düsseldorf Stadtbahn
