= 1978 in the environment =

This is a list of notable events relating to the environment in 1978. They relate to environmental law, conservation, environmentalism and environmental issues.

== Events ==
- The Kessler syndrome is proposed. It is a scenario in which the density of objects in low Earth orbit is high enough that collisions between objects could cause a cascade – each collision generating debris which increases the likelihood of further collisions. It would render space exploration unfeasible for a period of time.
- The Australian state of Victoria passes the Environment Effects Act 1978.
- The environmental issues surrounding the notorious Love Canal, a former dump site in the neighborhood in Niagara Falls, New York, in the United States, is highlighted in the media.
- The Royal Commission on Nuclear Power Generation in New Zealand reported back to the Government. The report concluded that there was no immediate need but it may be economically possible in the 21st century.
- The Green Wall of China, a major series of tree planting designed to hold back the expansion of the Gobi Desert, was started. There has been some debate about the effectiveness of the project.

=== January ===
- Manufacturing of PCBs was prohibited in the US, pursuant to the Toxic Substances Control Act.

=== February ===
- The 1976 Barcelona Convention for Protection against Pollution in the Mediterranean Sea (Barcelona Convention), a regional convention to prevent and abate pollution from ships, aircraft and land based sources in the Mediterranean Sea, comes into force.

=== March ===
- The Amoco Cadiz oil spill occurred on the coast of Brittany, France resulting in the largest oil spill of its kind in history to that date.
- The Convention for the Conservation of Antarctic Seals enters into force.

=== October ===
- The Environmental Modification Convention, formally the Convention on the Prohibition of Military or Any Other Hostile Use of Environmental Modification Techniques is an international treaty prohibiting the military or other hostile use of environmental modification techniques, entered into force.
- The Marine Mammals Protection Act is passed in New Zealand.
- US President Jimmy Carter signed the Antarctic Conservation Act.

=== November ===
- US President Jimmy Carter signed the Endangered Species Act Amendments of 1978.

== See also ==
- Human impact on the environment
- List of environmental issues
- List of years in the environment
