= Brian Birley Roberts =

Polar expert and ornithologist (1912-1978)

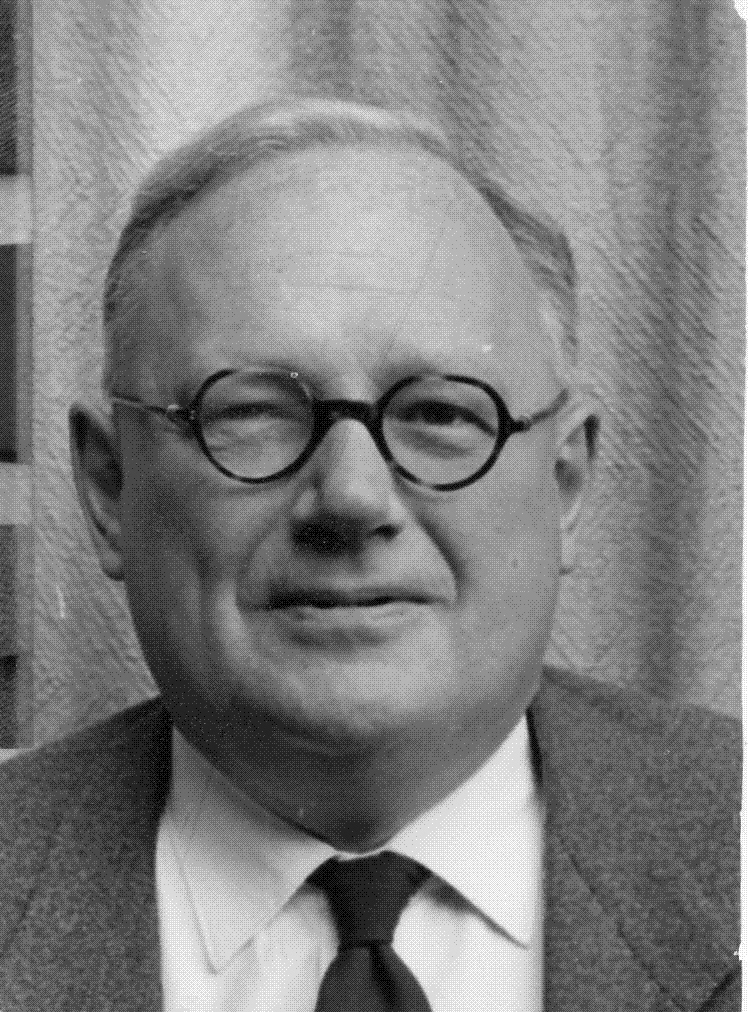

Brian Birley Roberts CMG (23 October 1912 – 9 October 1978) was a British polar expert, ornithologist and diplomat who played a key role in the development of the Antarctic Treaty System. A biography of Roberts has been published.

== Early life ==
Brian Roberts was born in Woking, Surrey. He was the youngest of four children of Charles Michael Roberts, a doctor, and Madeline Julia Birley. He was educated at Uppingham School and Emmanuel College, Cambridge. In childhood he developed an interest in birds, photography and the polar regions, which was stimulated by adventurous family holidays

== Polar exploration and ornithology ==
Sledge flag used by Roberts in Antarctica during the British Graham Land Expedition

As an undergraduate, Roberts led Cambridge expeditions to Vatnajökull, Iceland (1932) and to Scoresbysund, east Greenland (1933). On the latter, the party was taken to and fro by French polar explorer Jean-Baptiste Charcot on the vessel Pourquoi Pas? In 1934, he graduated in geography, archaeology and anthropology Tripos. Later that year, he joined the three-year British Graham Land Expedition to the Antarctic led by John Rymill.

His experience with appendicitis during the first year of the expedition was turned to advantage when circumstances necessitated his spending time both in the Falkland Islands and in South Georgia, where the sub-Antarctic wildlife presented him with rich study opportunities. Brian Roberts' pioneering work on Wilson's petrel and research on the breeding behavior of penguins earned him a Cambridge doctorate.

Roberts continued to take part in polar expeditions during his professional life as official British observer, including the Norwegian–British–Swedish Expedition to Queen Maud Land, Antarctica in 1950–1951 and Operation Deep Freeze 61 (1960–1961).

== Scott Polar Research Institute ==
During the Second World War, Roberts was appointed by the War Office to research cold climate clothing and equipment, and subsequently by Naval Intelligence to edit Admiralty Geographical Handbooks for the Arctic region. At the end of the war, Roberts was appointed as a part-time Research Fellow (later Associate) at the Scott Polar Research Institute, Cambridge. In 1947, with Gerald Seligman he co-founded and edited the Journal of Glaciology.

Roberts was instrumental in the development of the Scott Institute into a world center for polar research and information, introducing and editing the Universal Decimal Classification for use in Polar Libraries. He was involved from early on in the editing of the Institute's house journal Polar Record. He worked part-time in Cambridge and part-time in London for 30 years before his retirement in 1975, continuing to write on a wide range of polar matters, including numerous articles in Polar Record.

== UK Foreign Office and the Antarctic Treaty ==
In 1944, Roberts was recruited to the Foreign Office Research Department to work on the political problems of the British Antarctic Territory, then known as the Falkland Islands Dependencies, and to co-manage with James Wordie and Neil Mackintosh the secret British Antarctic expedition Operation Tabarin, which was renamed the Falkland Islands Dependencies Survey in 1945 and eventually became the British Antarctic Survey in 1962. From 1946 to 1975, Roberts continued to work part-time at the UK Foreign Office as its first Head of the Polar Regions Section, providing specialist knowledge on Antarctic history, politics, place naming and terminology, and initiating the post-war Antarctic Place-Names Committee.

This work evolved into the search for a political solution to the increasing post-war competition and conflicting claims to sovereignty in the Antarctic, which were eventually resolved in the 1959 Washington Conference that Roberts attended and at which the Antarctic Treaty was signed by 12 nations. Roberts had a major role in the conception and evolution of the Treaty and continued to do so once the Treaty became operational, representing the UK during the years 1961–1975 at the (then) biennial Antarctic Treaty Consultative Meetings. Out of his concerns for nature conservation in the Antarctic he initiated the Agreed Measures for the Conservation of Antarctic Fauna and Flora and the Convention on the Conservation of Antarctic Seals (1972).

== Recognition ==
Roberts received awards.

- Polar Medal (1940)
- Bruce Memorial Prize by the Royal Society of Edinburgh, Royal Physical Society of Edinburgh and Royal Scottish Geographical Society (1940)
- Royal Geographical Society Back Award (1949)
- Extraordinary Fellowship of Churchill College, Cambridge (1965)
- Order of St Michael and St George (1969)
- Royal Geographical Society's Founder's Medal (1976).

Places in the Antarctic named after Roberts include Roberts Ice Piedmont and Roberts Knoll.
