= ARA Petrel =

History

Argentina
- Name: Petrel
- Namesake: Petrel, an aquatic bird from Argentina’s littoral.
- Builder: Cadenazzi Shipyard, Argentina
- Commissioned: 17 de Julio de 1965(afirmación de pabellón)
- Home port: Buenos Aires
- Status: Decommissioned

General characteristics
- Type: Hydrographic survey vessel
- Displacement: 54 tons
- Length: 19.6 m (64.3 ft)
- Beam: 4.3 m (14.1 ft)
- Draft: 1.9 m (6.2 ft)
- Propulsion: 2-shaft, 2 × Diesel engines, 340 hp (250 kW)
- Speed: 12 knots (14 mph; 22 km/h)
- Range: 1,152 nautical miles @ 9kn
- Complement: 8
- Notes: Career and characteristics data from “Histarmar”.

ARA Petrel was a hydrographic survey boat of the Argentine Navy, built in the Cadenazzi Shipyard and based in Buenos Aires. The vessel is named after the petrel, a seabird that inhabits Argentina's littoral, and is the third Argentine naval ship with this name.

== Design ==
Petrel was a coastal and fluvial research ship designed by the engineering team at Cadenazzi Shipyard, where it was built.

It was powered by two diesel engines driving two propellers.

== History ==
Petrel was built in the Cadenazzi Shipyard, in Tigre, Buenos Aires. Commissioned by the Argentine Navy in July 1965, she was assigned to the Naval Hydrographic Service ((in Spanish) Servicio de Hidrografía Naval).

She undertook several campaigns, which included sounding, current measuring, water sampling and bottom sampling; same as the survey launch Cormorán.

As of late 2015, Petrel has been decommissioned.

== See also ==
- List of auxiliary ships of the Argentine Navy
