= South African Citizens in Antarctica Act, 1962 =

Parliament of South Africa
- Long title: Act to apply the laws of the Republic, and to make provision for the administration of justice, with reference to South African citizens in Antarctica.
- Citation: Act No. 55 of 1962
- Territorial extent: Antarctica
- Assented to: 21 May 1962
- Commenced: 25 May 1962
- Administered by: Department of Justice and Constitutional Development

Amended by
- Environmental Laws Rationalisation Act, 1997

Related legislation
- Antarctic Treaties Act, 1996
- Status: In force

The South African Citizens in Antarctica Act, 1962 (Act No. 55 of 1962) is a South African statute which applies the country's law to its citizens in Antarctica. It provides that "[t]he laws from time to time in force in the Republic [of South Africa] shall apply to any South African citizen while he is in Antarctica." Antarctica is defined as the area south of the 60°S latitude, corresponding to the extent of the Antarctic Treaty System. For the application of the law, Antarctica is deemed to fall within the district of the magistrate's court at Cape Town.

The law was enacted so that the scientists of the South African National Antarctic Expedition (SANAE), which began in 1959, would be covered by South African law. Originally it placed Antarctica under the jurisdiction of the magistrate's court at Pretoria. The act was amended by the Environmental Laws Rationalisation Act, 1997 to move this jurisdiction to the court at Cape Town, bringing it in line with the Prince Edward Islands Act, 1948 and the Antarctic Treaties Act, 1996.

== See also ==
- Crime in Antarctica
- Antarctic Treaty System
