= Deception Island incident =

Incident between the United Kingdom, Argentina and Chile during the Cold War

| Date | 15 February 1953 |
| Location | Whalers Bay, Deception Island, Antarctica |
| Result | Destruction of Argentine and Chilean bases |

Belligerents
| United Kingdom | Argentina; Chile |

Commanders and leaders
| Maj. Edwards | Lt. Chihigaren |

Strength
| 35 Royal Marines; HMS Snipe | 2 Argentine sailors |

Casualties and losses
| none | 2 prisoners 2 Antarctic bases destroyed |

The Deception Island incident took place in February 1953 when a group of British Royal Marines landed on Deception Island in Antarctica, took two Argentine sailors prisoner and destroyed both an Argentine Navy base and nearby Chilean base.

== Background ==
In 1943, the United Kingdom launched Operation Tabarin, with the goal of asserting its claim to a portion of Antarctica, which was also claimed by both Argentina and Chile. For the next few years, British warships would patrol the region, destroying Argentine and Chilean sovereignty markers. As part of this operation, British forces built a base on Whalers Bay, Deception Island, called Station B (62° 59′ S, 60° 34′ W) The island was considered to be of strategic importance due to its naturally protected deep water harbor. Despite these efforts, both South American countries continued to expand their presence in Antarctica, building more bases and installing new sovereignty markers. In early 1948, the Argentine Navy established a permanent base on the island, close to Fumarole Bay (which they called Primero de Mayo Bay) called Deception Station, garrisoned by ten men. They also built smaller shelters and depots in Telefon Bay and Pendulum Cove.

== The incident ==
As part of its summer campaign of 1952–53, the Argentine Navy dispatched several ships to Antarctica to rotate garrisons, resupply and repair their bases, and begin the construction of a new facility in Deception Island to perform scientific work.

On 13 January 1953, Argentine transport ship ARA Bahia Aguirre tried to enter Whalers Bay to unload men and supplies in order to build the new facility, but the bay was blocked by large chunks of ice; personnel and materials had to be transferred to the much smaller trawler ARA Chiriguano, which took over the operation. Construction began on 14 January. The site was located roughly 365 meters (1200 ft) from the British Station B and adjacent to a runway that the British garrison used to launch reconnaissance flights. Part of the runway was also used as a football field.

British personnel in Station B noticed the construction and Base Leader W. Clarke delivered a note of protest later that day, claiming the island was British territory. The Argentines replied with a note of protest of their own. ARA Chiriguano left Deception Island on the 16th to assist ARA Sanavirón (also a trawler) which was trying to return to Ushuaia at 2 knots after three of its propeller blades suffered damage hitting a chunk of ice in the vicinity of Hope Bay, 186 km (115 miles) from Deception Island. Construction finished on the 17th, and the base was inaugurated early on the 18th by Captain Rodolfo N. Panzarini, commander of the Argentine Navy's Antarctic Task Force. The base was named "Teniente Cándido de Lasala" after a Navy officer who died in the British invasions of the River Plate. It would be garrisoned by four men- one officer (Lieutenant Jorge D. Chihigaren) two sailors (Corporals Acosta and Blázquez) and one scientist (Geologist Luis Vullo). ARA Bahia Aguirre left Deception Island on the 19th to help trawl the Sanavirón. On the same day, British frigate HMS Snipe (U20) arrived to Whalers Bay and delivered a new note of protest to the base, claiming that the Argentines were trespassing on British territory. In response, tanker ARA Punta Ninfas (which had been assisting the Sanavirón) sailed to the island and delivered a response to the Snipe, claiming that it was the British who were trespassing. On 23 January, Chilean ships Lientur and Leucotón moored close by and began building their own base 200 meters (660 ft) west of the Lasala installation. They left on 7 February.

On 30 January, the British Colonial Office sent a telegram to the Falkland Islands administration, saying: "Latest Argentinian and Chilean landings in Deception Island appear to be deliberately provocative, and ones we should not tolerate." Plans were made to send troops to the island. No warning was given to the Argentine and Chilean governments to safeguard the element of surprise. On 15 February at 14:05, thirty-five Royal Marines under the command of Major C. Edwards landed on the island from HMS Snipe. The marines were equipped with Sten guns, rifles, bayonets and tear gas. They surrounded the Lasala base and took Acosta and Blázquez prisoner; the Argentine flag was lowered and seized, along with weapons, ammunition, documentation and Vullo's scientific equipment. Lt. Chihigaren and Vullo were in Deception Station, taking inventory of some construction materials. Before leaving, the marines set both the Argentine and the Chilean bases on fire. Chilean personnel were not present at the time. The next morning, Lt. Chihigaren returned from Deception station and found his base destroyed. He then walked to Station B to find out what had happened and was told by Clarke that his men had been taken to South Georgia. He returned to Deception Station and reported what had happened.

== Reactions ==
Transport ship ARA Bahía Buen Suceso along with ARA Chiriguano and ARA Sanavirón (repaired on 9 February) were immediately ordered to sail towards Deception Island. ARA Bahía Aguirre was sent to reinforce Half-Moon Island, 50 km (31 miles) from Deception Island; the Argentine Navy was building a base there (Cámara Base) and believed HMS Snipe could be heading there to attack it. The Navy tried to launch reconnaissance flights from Deception Station using two Grumman G-21 Goose flying boats, but bad weather made it impossible. Argentine bases in Antarctica received orders via radio to not surrender if attacked. In Port Belgrano Naval Base, the Argentine Navy began to increase its state of readiness in preparation for a broader conflict, but the Chiefs of Staff announced that a decision had been made to resolve the incident diplomatically. Lt. Chihigaren and Captain Panzarini were ordered to deliver a note of protest to Station B, which was received by Clarke and Maj. Edwards. On 18 February, HMS Snipe released Acosta and Blázquez in Grytviken, where they were picked up by Argentine tanker Quilmes. HMS Snipe then sailed back to Deception.

Argentine President Juan Perón was visiting Chile when news of the attack reached the continent. Together with Chilean President Carlos Ibáñez del Campo, they issued a strong protest to the British embassy, demanding an apology, and discussed a possible joint response. The Chilean Foreign Minister insisted on sending ships to Deception Island, and resigned when Ibáñez del Campo ultimately decided not to, calling it a "cowardly" decision. Avro Lincoln bomber aircraft of the Argentinean Air Force overflew Deception Island on 25 February; two days later, tensions reached their peak when warning shots were fired at ARA Chiriguano. HMS Bigbury Bay arrived to Whalers Bay on 16 March, reinforcing HMS Snipe.

== Aftermath ==
Major Edwards and the Royal Marines left the island aboard the HMS Bigbury Bay on 16 April. Their mission was considered a success, and they were congratulated by Sir Anthony Eden. Plans to set up a permanent detachment of 12 Royal Marines in Deception Island were shelved to prevent an escalation. The Argentine Navy re-inaugurated the Lasala base on 30 December, during their 1953-1954 summer campaign. It was used by the Naval Hydrographic Service for a few years before being abandoned. A volcanic eruption destroyed it in 1967. The Chilean base was rebuilt in 1954.

The United Kingdom eventually returned the items and weapons taken from the Lasala base. The flag is now exhibited at the William Brown naval museum in Buenos Aires.

The island, like the rest of Antarctica, is currently administered under the Antarctic Treaty System, pausing all territorial claims.

== See also ==
- Hope Bay incident
- Military activity in the Antarctic
- Territorial claims in Antarctica
