= Military activity in the Antarctic =

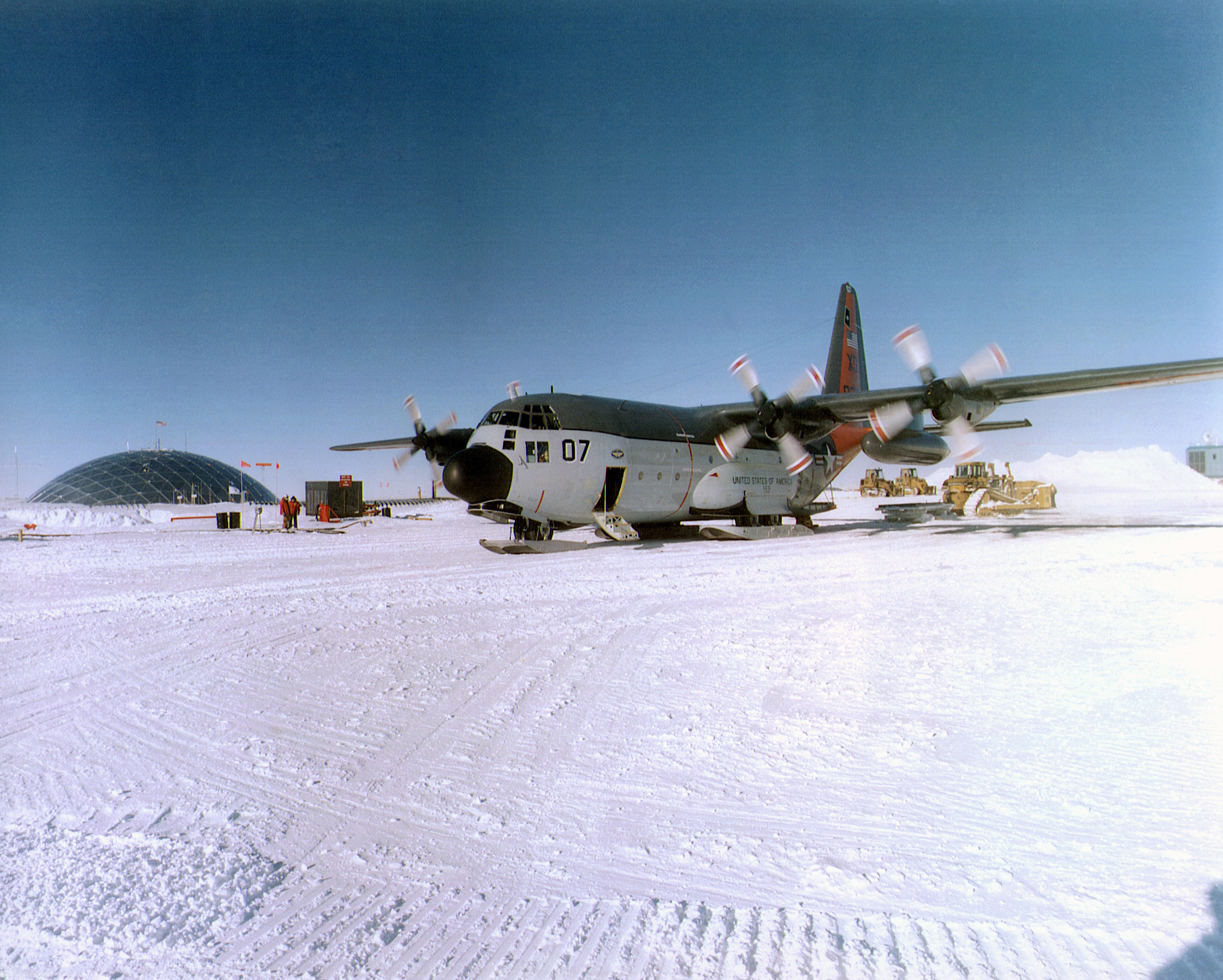
A United States Navy LC-130 Hercules near the Amundsen–Scott South Pole Station in 1996

As Antarctica has never been permanently settled by humans, there has historically been little military activity in the Antarctic. The Antarctic Treaty, which came into effect on June 23, 1961, bans military activity from the continent. Military personnel and equipment may only be used for scientific research or any other peaceful purposes, such as delivering supplies.

The Antarctic Treaty specifically prohibits military activity on land or ice shelves below 60°S. While the use of nuclear weapons is absolutely prohibited, the Treaty does not apply to naval activity within these bounds (in the Southern Ocean) so long as it takes place on the high seas.

== Notable operations ==
Military forces from many countries have provided support to scientific expeditions and bases in Antarctica. Notable operations and expeditions have included:

- Commander James Cook's second voyage (United Kingdom, 1773)
- USS Vincennes' surveys of Antarctica (United States, 1839 and 1840)
- In February 1941 the German auxiliary cruiser Komet patrolled the Ross Sea and Antarctic coastline in an unsuccessful search for Allied whalers
- Operation Tabarin (United Kingdom, 1944–45)
- Operation Highjump (United States, 1946–47)
- Base Soberanía (Chile, 1947)
- Operation Windmill (United States, 1947–48)
- Base O'Higgins (Chile, 1948)
- The Australian auxiliary HMAS Wyatt Earp made an unsuccessful voyage to Antarctica in 1948.
- Base González Videla (Chile, 1951)
- Hope Bay incident and Deception Island incident (confrontations between Argentine and British military forces, 1952-53)
- Base Aguirre Cerda (Chile, 1955)
- Operation Deep Freeze (United States, 1955–present)
- Operación 90 (Argentina, 1965)
- Base Presidente Frei (Chile, 1980)
- Comandante Ferraz Antarctic Station (Brazil, 1984)
- Operación Estrella Polar I (Chile, 1984)
- Operación Estrella Polar II (Chile, 1995)
- Operación Aurora Austral (Chile, 1996)
- Estación Parodi (Chile, 1999)
- Expedición Hielo I (Chile, 2002)
- Expedición Hielo II (Chile, 2004)
- In January 2006, a Royal New Zealand Air Force P-3K Orion maritime patrol aircraft conducted a trial flight to and from Pegasus Airfield near McMurdo Station to determine the feasibility of conducting patrols from Antarctica in support of the Convention for the Conservation of Antarctic Marine Living Resources. RNZAF P-3Ks have regularly conducted flights to and from Antarctica since this successful trial.
- Operation Southern Discovery (Australia)
- Operación Estrella Polar III (Chile, 2025)

== Potential for future conflicts ==
John Keegan and Andrew Wheatcroft, in their 1986 book Zones of Conflict: An Atlas of Future Wars, make the point that strategic interests in Antarctica derive from two causes: economic and strategic. Antarctica has great potential economic value, in terms of mineral and oil resources. Strategically, there was continuing concern about keeping the Cape Horn route available for free passage during the Cold War, as, among other things, U.S. aircraft carriers cannot pass through the Panama Canal. The Falkland Islands, Keegan and Wheatcroft go on to say, dominate the Drake Passage, the 'stretch of stormy water separating South America from the Antarctic'. This was a less publicised factor during the Falklands War.

However, with the dissolution of the Soviet Union, and increasing competition for fossil fuel resources, the 'economic' rather than the 'strategic' rationale will likely grow more important in the early twenty-first century.
