= Antarctic Conservation Act =

- Long title: An Act to implement the Agreed Measures for the Conservation of Antarctic Fauna and Flora of the Antarctic Treaty; An Act to implement the Agreed Measures for the Conservation of Antarctic Fauna and Flora, and for other purposes.
- Nicknames: Antarctic Conservation Act of 1978
- Enacted by: the 95th United States Congress

Citations
- Public law: 95-541
- Statutes at Large: 92 Stat. 2048

Codification
- Titles amended: 16 U.S.C.: Conservation
- U.S.C. sections created: 16 U.S.C. ch. 44 § 2401 et seq.

Legislative history
- Introduced in the House as H.R. 7749 by John M. Murphy (D–NY) on June 13, 1977; Committee consideration by House Merchant Marine and Fisheries, House Science, Space, and Technology, Senate Commerce, Science, and Transportation, Senate Environment and Public Works, Senate Foreign Relations; Passed the House on September 25, 1978 (Passed); Passed the Senate on October 13, 1978, in lieu of S. 1691 (Passed) with amendment; House agreed to Senate amendment on October 14, 1978 (Passed); Signed into law by President Jimmy Carter on October 28, 1978

The Antarctic Conservation Act, enacted in 1978 by the 95th United States Congress (Pub. L. 95–541), and amended by Pub. L. 104–227 (text) (PDF), is a United States federal law that addresses the issue of environmental conservation on the continent of Antarctica. The Departments of the Treasury, Interior and Commerce are responsible for the Act's enforcement.

The Act can be found in 16 U.S.C. §§ 2401–2413.

== Purpose ==
Until the 1960s, few rules existed regarding activities in Antarctica. Fishing, whaling and sealing were uncontrolled, and various species were threatened with extinction. Tourists and research stations littered and polluted. In 1961 the Antarctic Treaty was established to protect the continent, and establishes major restrictions and responsibilities on visitors and uses.

As part of its responsibilities as a signatory to the Antarctic Treaty, the United States passed the Antarctic Conservation Act of 1978 to establish rules for all U.S. citizens, U.S. corporations, and certain persons who participate in U.S. government expeditions visiting or operating in Antarctica, as well as U.S. citizens who handle certain Antarctic animals and plants, and other persons handling Antarctic animals and plants while in the U.S.

The act makes it: “(…) unlawful, unless authorized by permit, to:

1. take native mammals or birds
2. enter specially designated areas
3. introduce nonindigenous species to Antarctica
4. use or discharge designated pollutants
5. discharge wastes
6. import certain antarctic items into the United States”

== See also ==
- Agreed Measures for the Conservation of Antarctic Fauna and Flora
