= Antarctic Treaty System =

International treaties concerning Antarctica

Antarctic Treaty
The Antarctic Treaty French: Traité sur l'Antarctique Russian: Договор об Антарктике Spanish: Tratado Antártico
- Flag of the Antarctic Treaty System
- Type: Condominium
- Signed: 1 December 1959
- Location: Washington, D.C., United States
- Effective: 23 June 1961
- Condition: Ratification of all 12 signatories
- Signatories: 12
- Parties: 58
- Depositary: Federal government of the United States
- Languages: English, French, Russian, and Spanish

Full text
- Antarctic Treaty at Wikisource

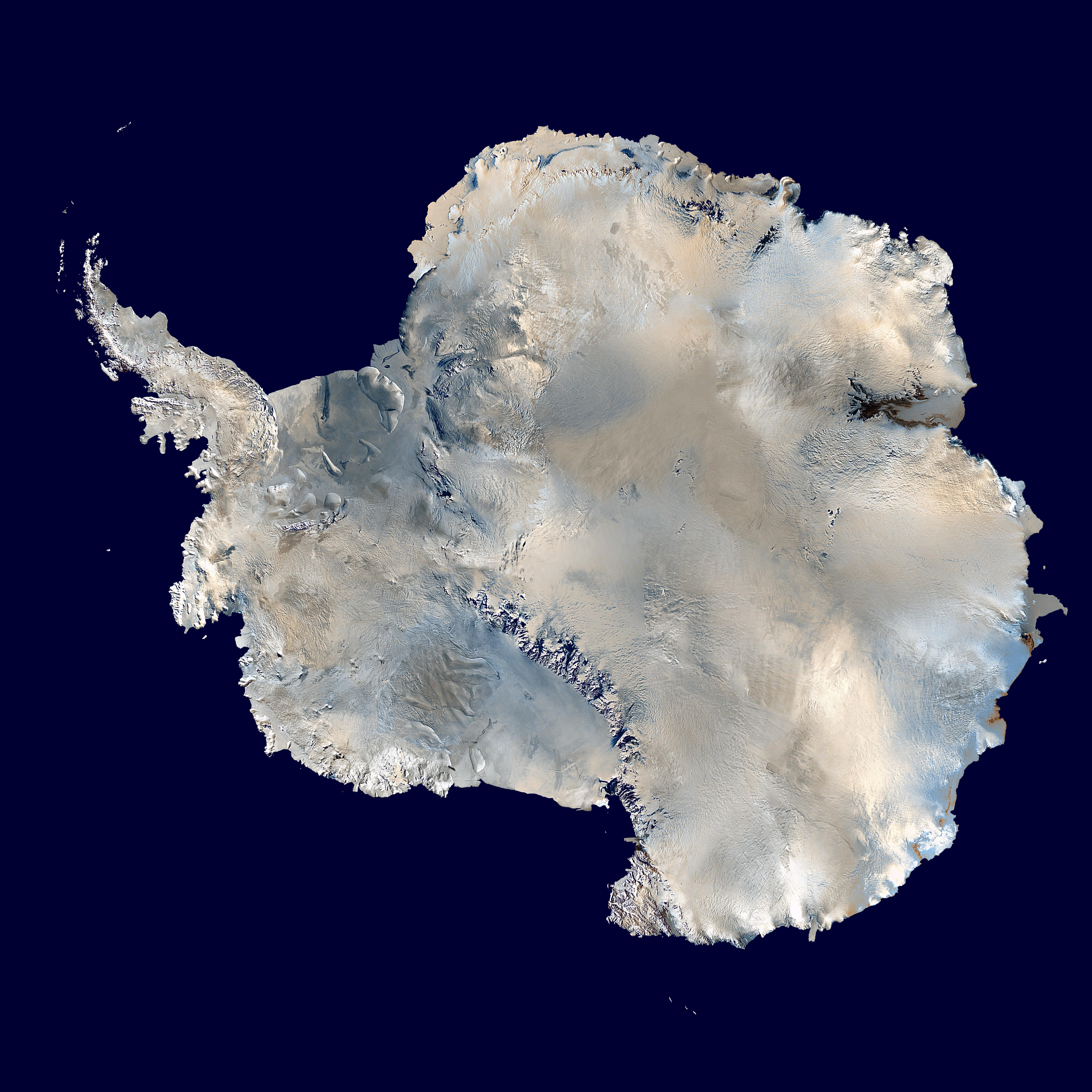
A 2002 satellite composite image of Antarctica

The Antarctic Treaty and related agreements, collectively known as the Antarctic Treaty System (ATS), regulate international relations with respect to Antarctica, Earth's only continent without a native human population. It was the first arms control agreement established during the Cold War, designating the continent as a scientific preserve, establishing freedom of scientific investigation, and banning military activity; for the purposes of the treaty system, Antarctica is defined as all the land and ice shelves south of 60°S latitude. Since September 2004, the Antarctic Treaty Secretariat, which implements the treaty system, is headquartered in Buenos Aires, Argentina.

The main treaty was opened for signature on 1 December 1959, and officially entered into force on 23 June 1961. The original signatories were the 12 countries active in Antarctica during the International Geophysical Year (IGY) of 1957–58: Argentina, Australia, Belgium, Chile, France, Japan, New Zealand, Norway, South Africa, the Soviet Union, the United Kingdom, and the United States. These countries had established over 55 Antarctic research stations for the IGY, and the subsequent promulgation of the treaty was seen as a diplomatic expression of the operational and scientific cooperation that had been achieved. As of 2024, the treaty has 58 parties.

== History ==
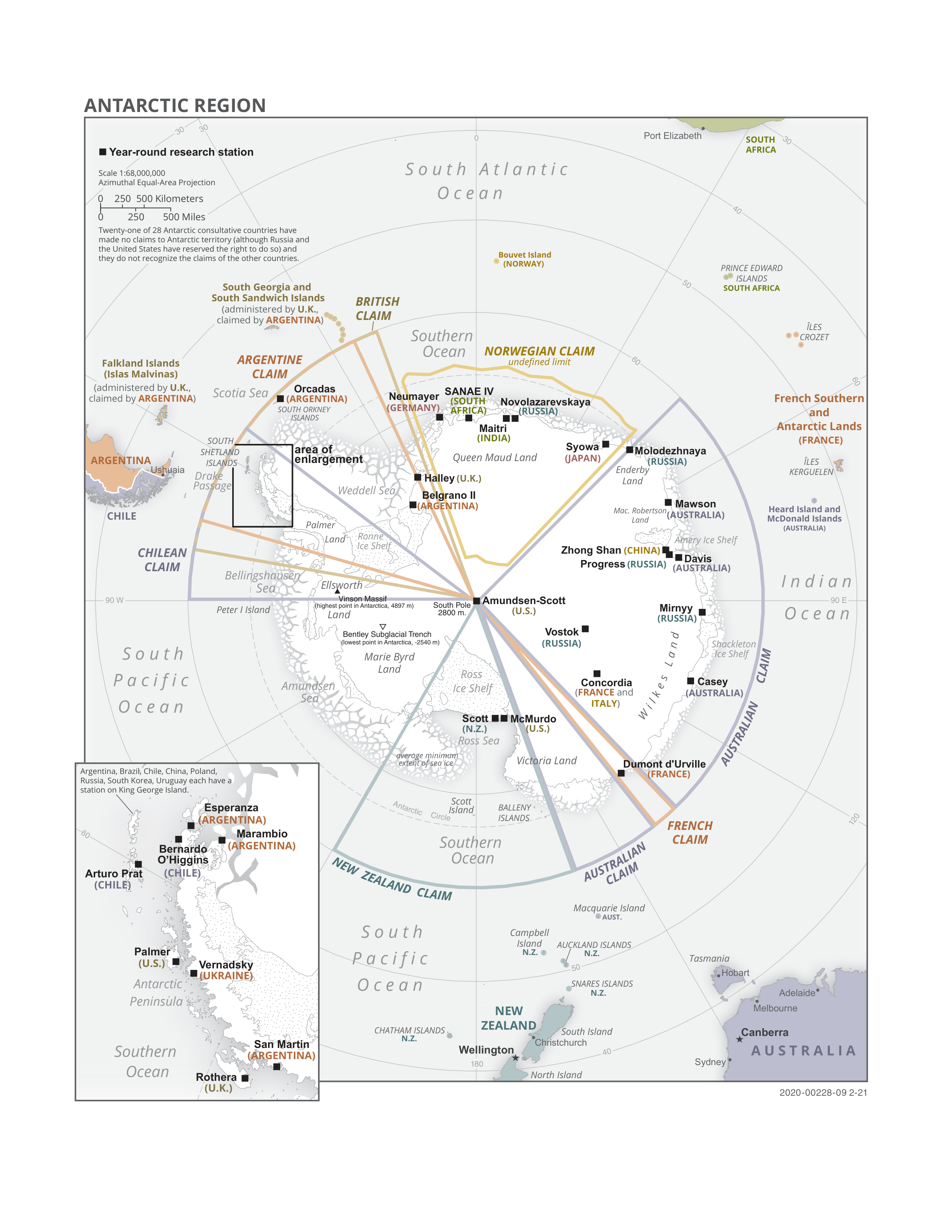
Map of research stations and territorial claims in Antarctica (2015)

After World War II, the U.S. considered establishing a claim in Antarctica. From 26 August 1946, and until the beginning of 1947, it carried out Operation Highjump, the largest military expeditionary force that the United States had ever sent to Antarctica, consisting of 13 ships, 4,700 men, and numerous aerial devices. Its goals were to train military personnel and to test material in conditions of extreme cold for a hypothetical war in the Antarctic.

On 2 September 1947, the quadrant of Antarctica in which the United States was interested (between 24° W and 90° W) was included as part of the security zone of the Inter-American Treaty of Reciprocal Assistance, committing its members to defend it in case of external aggression.

In August 1948, the United States proposed that Antarctica be under the guardianship of the United Nations, as a trust territory administered by Argentina, Australia, Chile, France, the United States, the United Kingdom, and New Zealand. This idea was rejected by Argentina, Australia, Chile, France, and Norway. Before the rejection, on 28 August 1948, the United States proposed to the claimant countries some form of internationalization of Antarctica, and the United Kingdom supported this. Chile responded by presenting a plan to suspend all Antarctic claims for five to ten years while negotiating a final solution, but this did not find acceptance.

In 1950, the interest of the United States to keep the Soviet Union away from Antarctica was frustrated, when the Soviets informed the claimant states that they would not accept any Antarctic agreement in which they were not represented. The fear that the USSR would react by making a territorial claim, bringing the Cold War to Antarctica, led the United States to make none.

=== International conflicts ===
Various international conflicts motivated the creation of an agreement for the Antarctic.

Some incidents had occurred during the Second World War, and a new one occurred in Hope Bay on 1 February 1952, when the Argentine military fired warning shots at a group of Britons. The response of the United Kingdom was to send a warship that landed marines at the scene on 4 February. In 1949, Argentina, Chile, and the United Kingdom signed a Tripartite Naval Declaration committing not to send warships south of the 60th parallel south, which was renewed annually until 1961 when it was deemed unnecessary when the treaty entered into force. This tripartite declaration was signed after the tension generated when Argentina sent a fleet of eight warships to Antarctica in February 1948.

On 17 January 1953, Argentina reopened the Lieutenant Lasala refuge on Deception Island, leaving a sergeant and a corporal in the Argentine Navy. On 15 February, in the Deception Island incident, 32 royal marines landed from the British frigate HMS Snipe armed with Sten machine guns, rifles, and tear gas capturing the two Argentine sailors. The Argentine refuge and a nearby uninhabited Chilean shelter were destroyed, and the Argentine sailors were delivered to a ship from that country on 18 February near South Georgia. A British detachment remained three months on the island while the frigate patrolled its waters until April.

On 4 May 1955, the United Kingdom filed two lawsuits, against Argentina and Chile respectively, before the International Court of Justice to declare the invalidity of the claims of the sovereignty of the two countries over Antarctic and sub-Antarctic areas. On 15 July 1955, the Chilean government rejected the jurisdiction of the court in that case, and on 1 August, the Argentine government also did so, so on 16 March 1956, the claims were closed.

In 1956 and 1958, India tried unsuccessfully to bring the Antarctic issue to the United Nations General Assembly.

=== International Geophysical Year ===
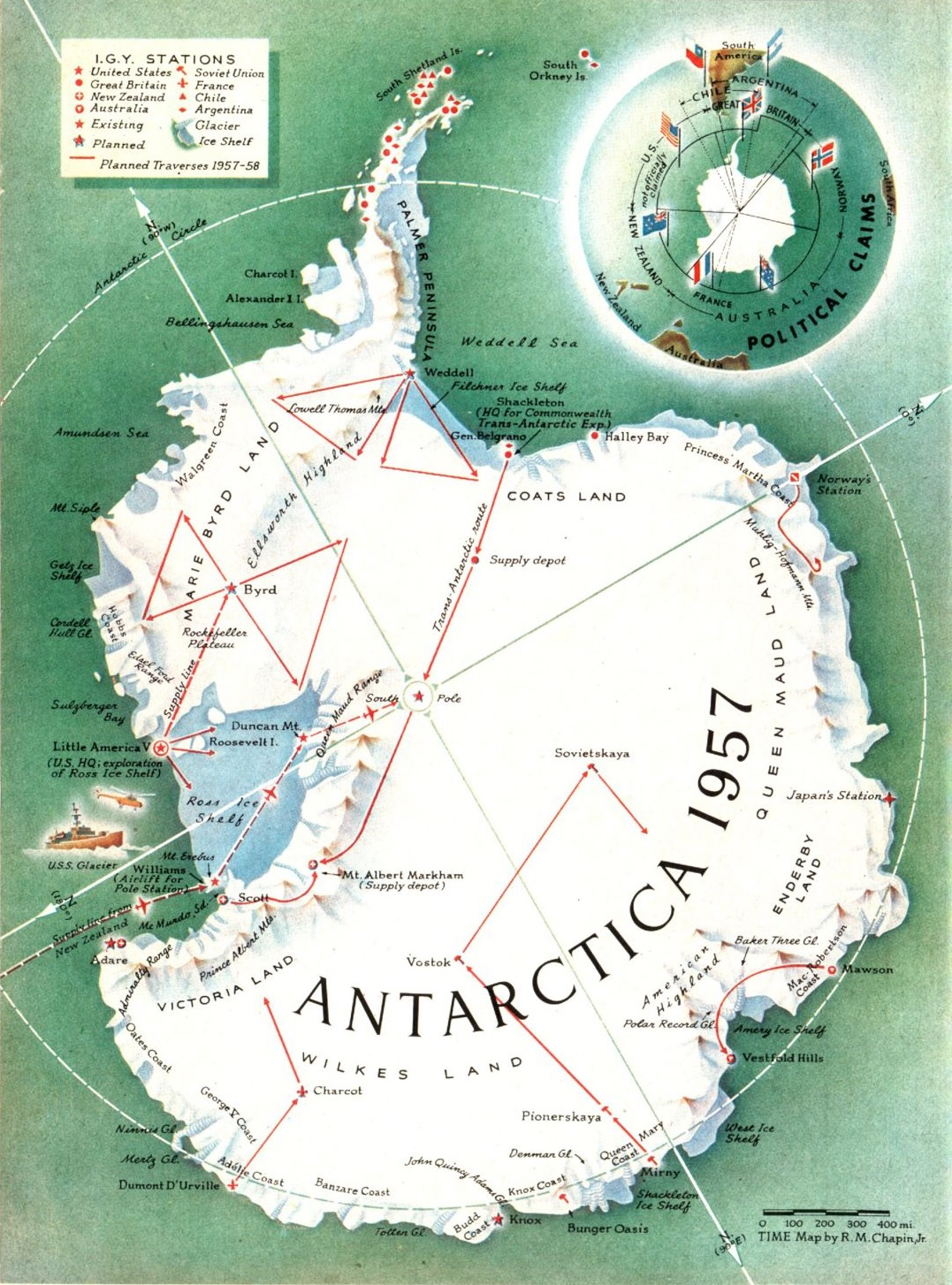
1957 poster of Antarctica IGY projects

In 1950, the International Council of Scientific Unions (ICSU) had discussed the possibility of holding a third International Polar Year. At the suggestion of the World Meteorological Organization, the idea of the International Polar Year was extended to the entire planet, thus creating the International Geophysical Year that took place between 1 July 1957, and 31 December 1958. In this event, 66 countries participated. At the ICSU meeting in Stockholm from 9 to 11 September 1957, the creation of a Special Committee for Antarctic Research (SCAR) was approved, inviting the twelve countries conducting Antarctic investigations to send delegates to integrate the committee, with the purpose of exchanging scientific information among its members regarding Antarctica. The SCAR was later renamed to the Scientific Committee for Research in Antarctica.

Both Argentina and Chile stated that research carried out on the continent during the International Geophysical Year would not give any territorial rights to the participants, and that the facilities that were erected during that year should be dismantled at the end of it. However, in February 1958, the United States proposed that the Antarctic investigations should be extended for another year, and the Soviet Union reported that it would maintain its scientific bases until the studies being carried out had been completed.

=== Negotiation of the treaty ===
Scientific bases increased international tension concerning Antarctica. The danger of the Cold War spreading to that continent caused the President of the United States, Dwight D. Eisenhower, to convene an Antarctic Conference of the twelve countries active in Antarctica during the International Geophysical Year, to sign a treaty. In the first phase, representatives of the twelve nations met in Washington, who met in sixty sessions between June 1958 and October 1959 to define a basic negotiating framework. However, no consensus was reached on a preliminary draft. In the second phase, a conference at the highest diplomatic level was held from 15 October to 1 December 1959, when the Treaty was signed.

The Antarctic Treaty was signed in 1959 by 12 nations and came into effect on 23 June 1961. The central ideas with full acceptance were the freedom of scientific research in Antarctica and the peaceful use of the continent. There was also a consensus for demilitarization and the maintenance of the status quo. The treaty prohibits nuclear testing, military operations, economic exploitation, and the making of new territorial claims in Antarctica. It is monitored through on-site inspections. The only permanent structures allowed are scientific research stations. The original signatory countries hold voting rights on Antarctic governance, with seven of them claiming portions of the continent and the remaining five being non-claimants. Other nations have joined as consultative members by conducting significant research in Antarctica. Non-consultative parties can also adhere to the treaty. In 1991–1992, the treaty was renegotiated by 33 nations, with the main change being the Madrid Protocol on Environmental Protection, which prohibited mining and oil exploration for 50 years.

The positions of the United States, the Soviet Union, the United Kingdom, and New Zealand coincided in the establishment of an international administration for Antarctica, proposing that it should be within the framework of the United Nations. Australia and the United Kingdom expressed the need for inspections by observers, and the British also proposed the use of military personnel for logistical functions. Argentina proposed that all atomic explosions be banned in Antarctica, which caused a crisis that lasted until the last day of the conference, since the United States, along with other countries, intended to ban only those that were made without prior notice and without prior consultation. The support of the USSR and Chile for the Argentine proposal finally caused the United States to retract its opposition.

The signing of the treaty was the first arms control agreement that occurred in the framework of the Cold War, and the participating countries managed to avoid the internationalization of Antarctic sovereignty.

Starting from the year 2048, any of the consultative parties to the treaty may request the revision of the treaty and its entire normative system, with the approval of a three-quarters majority of consultative parties needed for the adoption of any changes.

== Other agreements ==
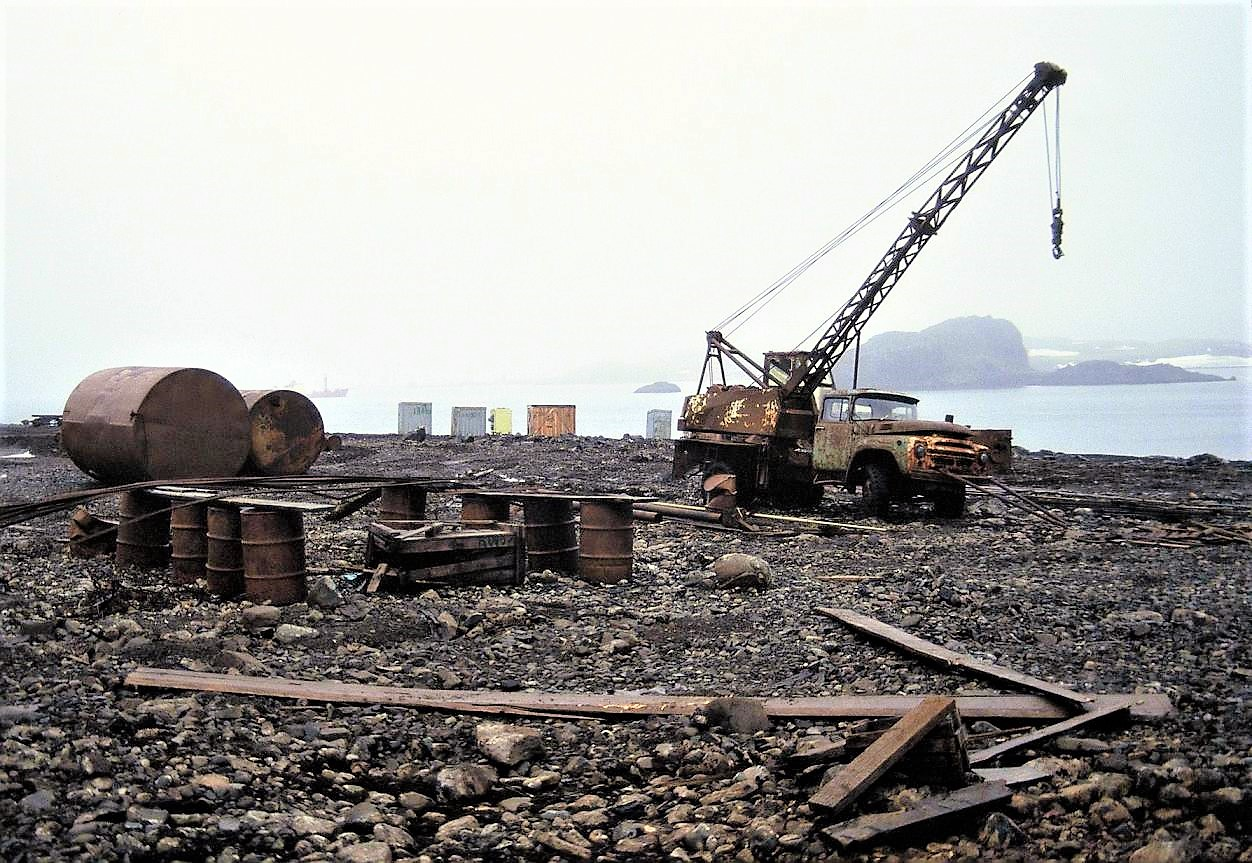
Disposal of waste by simply dumping it at the shoreline, as at the Russian Bellingshausen Station on King George Island, is no longer permitted by the Protocol on Environmental Protection.

Other agreements – some 200 recommendations adopted at treaty consultative meetings and ratified by governments – include:

- Agreed Measures for the Conservation of Antarctic Fauna and Flora (1964) (entered into force in 1982)
- The Convention for the Conservation of Antarctic Seals (1972)
- The Convention for the Conservation of Antarctic Marine Living Resources (1982)
- The Convention on the Regulation of Antarctic Mineral Resource Activities (1988) (signed in 1988, not in force)
- The Protocol on Environmental Protection to the Antarctic Treaty was signed 4 October 1991, and entered into force 14 January 1998; this agreement prevents development and provides for the protection of the Antarctic environment through five specific annexes on marine pollution, fauna and flora, environmental impact assessments, waste management, and protected areas. It prohibits all activities relating to mineral resources except scientific. A sixth annex on liability arising from environmental emergencies was adopted in 2005, but is yet to enter into force.

== Bilateral treaties ==
- Exchange of Notes constituting an Agreement between the Governments of Australia, New Zealand and the United Kingdom of Great Britain and Northern Ireland, and the Government of the French Republic, regarding Aerial Navigation in the Antarctic (Paris, 25 October 1938)
- Treaty Between the Government of Australia and the Government of the French Republic on Cooperation in the Maritime Areas Adjacent to the French Southern and Antarctic Territories (TAAF), Heard Island and the McDonald Islands (Canberra, 24 November 2003)
- Agreement on Cooperative Enforcement of Fisheries Laws between the Government of Australia and the Government of the French Republic in the Maritime Areas Adjacent to the French Southern and Antarctic Territories, Heard Island and the McDonald Islands (Paris, 8 January 2007)

== Meetings ==
The Antarctic Treaty System's yearly Antarctic Treaty Consultative Meetings (ATCM) are the international forum for the administration and management of the region. Only 29 of the 58 parties to the agreements have the right to participate in decision-making at these meetings, though the other 29 are still allowed to attend. The decision-making participants are the Consultative Parties and, in addition to the 12 original signatories, including 17 countries that have demonstrated their interest in Antarctica by carrying out substantial scientific activity there. The Antarctic Treaty also provides for Special Antarctic Treaty Consultative Meetings (SATCM), which are generally summoned to treat more important topics but are less frequent than ATCMs.

== State parties ==
State parties with consulting status making a claim to Antarctic territory State parties with consulting status reserving the right to make a territorial claim Other state parties with consulting status State parties without consulting status Non-party UN member states and observer states

As of 2024, there are 58 state parties to the treaty, 29 of which, including all 12 original signatories to the treaty, have consultative (voting) status. The consultative members include the seven countries that claim portions of Antarctica as their territory. The 51 non-claimant countries do not recognize the claims of others. Forty-two parties to the Antarctic Treaty have also ratified the Protocol on Environmental Protection to the Antarctic Treaty.

== Overview of parties to the Antarctic Treaty System ==
Country	Signature	Ratification/ Accession	Consultative status	Notes
Argentina (claim)^{*}	1 Dec 1959	23 Jun 1961	23 Jun 1961	
Australia (claim)	1 Dec 1959	23 Jun 1961	23 Jun 1961	
Austria	No	25 Aug 1987	No	
Belarus	No	27 Dec 2006	No	
Belgium	1 Dec 1959	26 Jul 1960	23 Jun 1961	
Brazil	No	16 May 1975	27 Sep 1983	
Bulgaria	No	11 Sep 1978	5 Jun 1998	
Canada	No	4 May 1988	No	
Chile (claim)^{*}	1 Dec 1959	23 Jun 1961	23 Jun 1961	
China	No	8 Jun 1983	7 Oct 1985	Applies to Hong Kong and Macau
Colombia	No	31 Jan 1989	No	
Costa Rica	No	11 Aug 2022	No	
Cuba	No	16 Aug 1984	No	
Czech Republic	No	1 Jan 1993	1 Apr 2014	Succession from Czechoslovakia, which acceded on 14 June 1962.
Denmark	No	20 May 1965	No	
Ecuador	No	15 Sep 1987	19 Nov 1990	
Estonia	No	17 May 2001	No	
Finland	No	15 May 1984	20 Oct 1989	
France (claim)	1 Dec 1959	16 Sep 1960	23 Jun 1961	
Germany (historical claim)	No	5 Feb 1979	3 Mar 1981	Ratified as West Germany. East Germany also acceded on 19 November 1974, and received consultative status on 5 October 1987, prior to its reunification with West Germany.
Greece	No	8 Jan 1987	No	
Guatemala	No	31 Jul 1991	No	
Hungary	No	27 Jan 1984	No	
Iceland	No	13 Oct 2015	No	
India	No	19 Aug 1983	12 Sep 1983	
Italy	No	18 Mar 1981	5 Oct 1987	
Japan (historical claim)	1 Dec 1959	4 Aug 1960	23 Jun 1961	
Kazakhstan	No	27 Jan 2015	No	
Malaysia	No	31 Oct 2011	No	
Monaco	No	31 May 2008	No	
Mongolia	No	23 Mar 2015	No	
Kingdom of the Netherlands	No	30 Mar 1967	19 Nov 1990	Applies to all constituent countries of Kingdom of the Netherlands. Formerly applied to Suriname until its independence on 25 November 1975.
New Zealand (claim)	1 Dec 1959	1 Nov 1960	23 Jun 1961	
North Korea	No	21 Jan 1987	No	
Norway (claim)	1 Dec 1959	24 Aug 1960	23 Jun 1961	
Pakistan	No	1 Mar 2012	No	
Papua New Guinea	No	16 Mar 1981	No	Succession from Australia. Effective from their independence on 16 September 1975.
Peru	No	10 Apr 1981	9 Oct 1989	
Poland	No	8 Jun 1961	29 Jul 1977	
Portugal	No	29 Jan 2010	No	
Romania	No	15 Sep 1971	No	
Russia^{†}	1 Dec 1959	2 Nov 1960	23 Jun 1961	Ratified as the Soviet Union.
San Marino	No	14 Feb 2023	No	
Saudi Arabia	No	22 May 2024	No	
Slovakia	No	1 Jan 1993	No	Succession from Czechoslovakia, which acceded on 14 June 1962.
Slovenia	No	22 Apr 2019	No	
South Africa	1 Dec 1959	21 Jun 1960	23 Jun 1961	Ratified as the Union of South Africa.
South Korea	No	28 Nov 1986	9 Oct 1989	
Spain (historical claim)	No	31 Mar 1982	21 Sep 1988	
Sweden	No	24 Apr 1984	21 Sep 1988	
Switzerland	No	15 Nov 1990	No	
Turkey	No	24 Jan 1996	No	
Ukraine	No	28 Oct 1992	4 Jun 2004	
United Arab Emirates	No	11 Dec 2024	No	
United Kingdom (claim)^{*}	1 Dec 1959	31 May 1960	23 Jun 1961	
United States^{†}	1 Dec 1959	18 Aug 1960	23 Jun 1961	
Uruguay	No	11 Jan 1980	7 Oct 1985	
Venezuela	No	24 May 1999	No	

^{*} Has an overlapping claim with another one or two claimants.
^{†} Reserved the right to make a claim.

== Antarctic Treaty Secretariat ==
The Antarctic Treaty Secretariat was established in Buenos Aires, Argentina in September 2004 by the Antarctic Treaty Consultative Meeting (ATCM). Jan Huber (the Netherlands) served as the first Executive Secretary for five years until 31 August 2009. He was succeeded on 1 September 2009, by Manfred Reinke (Germany). Reinke was succeeded by Albert Lluberas (Uruguay), who was elected in June 2017 at the 40th Antarctic Consultative Treaty Meeting in Beijing, China.

The tasks of the Antarctic Treaty Secretariat can be divided into the following areas:

- Supporting the annual Antarctic Treaty Consultative Meeting (ATCM) and the meeting of the Committee for Environmental Protection (CEP).
- Facilitating the exchange of information between the Parties required in the Treaty and the Environment Protocol.
- Collecting, storing, arranging and publishing the documents of the ATCM.
- Providing and disseminating public information about the Antarctic Treaty system and Antarctic activities.

== Legal system ==
Antarctica currently has no permanent population. The majority of Antarctica is claimed by one or more countries, but most countries do not recognize those claims. The area on the mainland between 90 degrees west and 150 degrees west is the only major land on Earth not claimed by any country. Until 2015 the interior of the Norwegian Sector, the extent of which had never been officially defined, was considered to be unclaimed. That year, Norway formally laid claim to the area between its Queen Maud Land and the South Pole.

Governments that are party to the Antarctic Treaty and its Protocol on Environmental Protection implement the articles of these agreements, and decisions taken under them, through national laws. These laws generally apply only to their own citizens, wherever they are in Antarctica, and serve to enforce the consensus decisions of the consultative parties: about which activities are acceptable, which areas require permits to enter, what processes of environmental impact assessment must precede activities, and so on. The Antarctic Treaty is often considered to represent an example of the common heritage of humanity principle.

=== Argentina ===
Argentina claims the Argentine Antarctic Territory (between 25° W and 74° W), which it considers an integral part of its national territory. Since 1990, the claimed territory has been administratively incorporated into the province of Tierra del Fuego, Antarctica and South Atlantic Islands under Law 23.775. Argentine law applies to all Argentine nationals in Antarctica, with jurisdiction falling under the courts of Ushuaia, the provincial capital.

Key legislation includes Decree-Law 2.191/1957, which established the foundational legal framework for Argentine Antarctic activities, and subsequent laws implementing the Antarctic Treaty System. The Argentine Antarctic Institute (Instituto Antártico Argentino), created in 1951, oversees scientific and logistical operations.

=== Australia ===
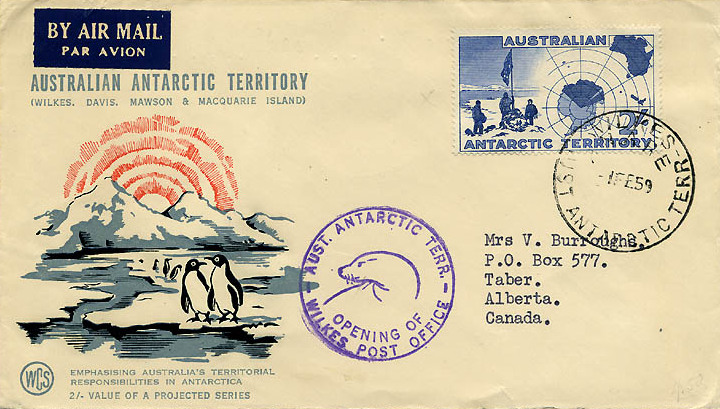
This 1959 cover commemorated the opening of the Wilkes post office in the Australian Antarctic Territory.

Since the designation of the Australian Antarctic Territory pre-dated the signing of the Antarctic Treaty, Australian laws that relate to Antarctica date from more than two decades before the Antarctic Treaty era. In terms of criminal law, the laws that apply to the Jervis Bay Territory (which follows the laws of the Australian Capital Territory) apply to the Australian Antarctic Territory. Key Australian legislation applying Antarctic Treaty System decisions include the Antarctic Treaty Act 1960, the Antarctic Treaty (Environment Protection) Act 1980 and the Antarctic Marine Living Resources Conservation Act 1981.

=== United States ===
The law of the United States, including certain criminal offences by or against U.S. nationals, such as murder, may apply to areas not under jurisdiction of other countries. To this end, the United States now stations special deputy U.S. Marshals in Antarctica to provide a law enforcement presence.

Some U.S. laws directly apply to Antarctica. For example, the Antarctic Conservation Act, Public Law 95-541, 16 U.S.C. § 2401 et seq., provides civil and criminal penalties for the following activities, unless authorized by regulation or statute:

- the taking of native Antarctic mammals or birds
- the introduction into Antarctica of non-indigenous plants and animals
- entry into specially protected or scientific areas
- the discharge or disposal of pollutants into Antarctica or Antarctic waters
- the importation into the U.S. of certain items from Antarctica

Violation of the Antarctic Conservation Act carries penalties of up to US$10,000 in fines and one year in prison. The Departments of the Treasury, Commerce, Transportation, and the Interior share enforcement responsibilities. The Act requires expeditions from the U.S. to Antarctica to notify, in advance, the Office of Oceans and Polar Affairs of the State Department, which reports such plans to other nations as required by the Antarctic Treaty. Further information is provided by the Office of Polar Programs of the National Science Foundation.

=== New Zealand ===
In 2006, the New Zealand police reported that jurisdictional issues prevented them issuing warrants for potential American witnesses who were reluctant to testify during the Christchurch Coroner's investigation into the death by poisoning of Australian astrophysicist Rodney Marks at the South Pole base in May 2000. Marks died while wintering over at the United States' Amundsen–Scott South Pole Station located at the geographic South Pole. Prior to autopsy, the death was attributed to natural causes by the National Science Foundation and the contractor administering the base. However, an autopsy in New Zealand revealed that Marks died from methanol poisoning. The New Zealand Police launched an investigation. In 2006, frustrated by lack of progress, the Christchurch Coroner said that it was unlikely that Marks ingested the methanol knowingly, although there is no certainty that he died as the direct result of the act of another person. During media interviews, the police detective in charge of the investigation criticized the National Science Foundation and contractor Raytheon for failing to cooperate with the investigation.

=== South Africa ===
Under the South African Citizens in Antarctica Act, 1962, South African law applies to all South African citizens in Antarctica, and they are subject to the jurisdiction of the magistrate's court in Cape Town. The Antarctic Treaties Act, 1996 incorporates the Antarctic Treaty and related agreements into South African law. In regard to violations of these treaties, South Africa also asserts jurisdiction over South African residents and members of expeditions organised in South Africa.

== See also ==
- Antarctic and Southern Ocean Coalition (ASOC)
- Antarctic Protected Areas
- Antarctic Treaty issue
- Arctic Council
- Arctic sanctuary
- Crime in Antarctica
- Endurance – lost ship of Ernest Shackleton, found in 2022 and protected by the treaty
- International Seabed Authority
- Montreal Protocol
- Moon Treaty
- Multilateral treaty
- National Antarctic Program
- Category: Outposts of Antarctica
- Research stations in Antarctica
- Solar radiation management
- Svalbard Treaty
