= Antarctic Treaties Act, 1996 =

Parliament of South Africa
- Long title: Act to provide for the application of certain treaties relating to Antarctica; and to provide for matters connected therewith.
- Citation: Act No. 60 of 1996
- Territorial extent: Antarctica
- Assented to: 24 October 1996
- Commenced: 1 February 1997
- Administered by: Department of Environment, Forestry and Fisheries

Related legislation
- Prince Edward Islands Act, 1948; South African Citizens in Antarctica Act, 1962
- Status: In force

The Antarctic Treaties Act, 1996 (Act No. 60 of 1996) is a South African statute that incorporates the Antarctic Treaty System into national law. It provides that the Antarctic Treaty, the Protocol on Environmental Protection (PEP), the Convention for the Conservation of Antarctic Seals, and the Convention for the Conservation of Antarctic Marine Living Resources all form part of South African law.

The act was enacted because of South Africa's ratification of the PEP in 1995, as well as the increase in Antarctic tourism. It asserts South African jurisdiction over treaty violations by South African citizens and permanent residents, as well as members of expeditions organised in South Africa, subject to exceptions for expeditions by foreign governments. It makes violations of treaty provisions criminal offences and sets maximum sentences for them. For the purposes of enforcement it places Antarctica within the jurisdiction of the magistrate's court at Cape Town.

== See also ==
- Crime in Antarctica
- Antarctic Treaty System
- South African Citizens in Antarctica Act, 1962
