= Prince Edward Islands Act, 1948 =

Parliament of South Africa
- Long title: Act to provide for the confirmation of the annexation to the Union of South Africa of the Prince Edward Islands, and for the administration, government and control of the said islands.
- Citation: Act No. 43 of 1948
- Territorial extent: Prince Edward Islands
- Enacted by: Parliament of South Africa
- Assented to: 1 October 1948
- Commenced: 7 October 1948
- Status: In force

The Prince Edward Islands Act, 1948 (Act No. 43 of 1948) is an act of the Parliament of South Africa that annexed the Prince Edward Islands to the Union of South Africa (as it then was). The South African flag was hoisted on Marion Island and Prince Edward Island on 29 December 1947 and 4 January 1948 respectively, and a proclamation of annexation was promulgated on 24 January 1948. The annexation was confirmed by Parliament by the Prince Edward Islands Act, which was signed by the Governor-General on 1 October 1948 and came into force upon publication on 7 October.

In terms of the act, the islands are deemed to fall within the magisterial district of Cape Town and the electoral ward containing the Port of Cape Town; as of 2011 this is ward 55 of the City of Cape Town. The common law applicable to the islands is defined to be the Roman-Dutch law as applied in the Cape Province. The act also extends certain other acts of Parliament to the island, and gives the Governor-General (i.e. the President) the power to extend other laws to the islands. It states that no other act will apply to the islands unless it is made to apply by such a proclamation or by the text of the act itself.

Certain provisions of the act, though not repealed, may have been superseded by the Antarctic Treaties Act, 1996 and the Antarctic Treaty System.

== List of acts made applicable to the islands ==
Except where otherwise indicated, each act listed below was made applicable to the Prince Edward Islands expressly by its own text.

- Administration of Estates Act, 1913 (by the PEI Act)
- Justices of the Peace and Oaths Act, 1914 (by the PEI Act)
- Criminal Procedure and Evidence Act, 1917 (by the PEI Act)
- Special Justices of the Peace Act, 1918 (by the PEI Act)
- Inquests Act, 1919 (by the PEI Act)
- Magistrates' Courts Act, 1944 (by the PEI Act)
- Electoral Consolidation Act, 1946 (by the PEI Act)
- South African Citizenship Act, 1949
- Merchant Shipping Act, 1951
- Public Holidays Act, 1952
- Territorial Waters Act, 1963 (by proclamation)
- Public Holidays Amendment Act, 1973
- Sea Birds and Seals Protection Act, 1973
- Sea Fisheries Act, 1973 (by proclamation)
- Territorial Waters Amendment Act, 1977 (by proclamation)
- Fishing Industry Development Act, 1978 (by proclamation)
- Dumping at Sea Control Act, 1980
- Marine Traffic Act, 1981 (by the Shipping General Amendment Act, 1997)
- Marine Pollution (Control and Civil Liability) Act, 1981 (by the Shipping General Amendment Act, 1997)
- Carriage of Goods by Sea Act, 1986 (by the Shipping General Amendment Act, 1997)
- Marine Pollution (Prevention of Pollution from Ships) Act, 1986 (by the International Convention for the Prevention of Pollution from Ships Amendment Act, 1996)
- Marine Pollution (Intervention) Act, 1987 (by the Shipping General Amendment Act, 1997)
- Sea Fishery Act, 1988
- Environment Conservation Act, 1989
- Maritime Zones Act, 1994
- South African Citizenship Act, 1995
- Antarctic Treaties Act, 1996
- Wreck and Salvage Act, 1996
- South African Maritime Safety Authority Act, 1998
- Marine Living Resources Act, 1998
- Ship Registration Act, 1998
- Sea Transport Documents Act, 2000
- National Environmental Management: Protected Areas Act, 2003
- National Environmental Management: Biodiversity Act, 2004
- National Environmental Management: Integrated Coastal Management Act, 2007
- Merchant Shipping (Safe Containers Convention) Act, 2011
- Merchant Shipping (International Oil Pollution Compensation Fund) Act, 2013
- Merchant Shipping (Civil Liability Convention) Act, 2013
- Marine Spatial Planning Act, 2018
