= Crime in Antarctica =

While crime in Antarctica is relatively rare, isolation and boredom may affect some people negatively and may lead to crime. Alcoholism is a known problem on the continent and has led to fights and indecent exposure. Other types of crime that have occurred in Antarctica include illicit drug use including cannabis, torturing and killing wildlife, racing motorbikes through environmentally sensitive areas, assault with a deadly weapon, attempted murder, and arson. Sexual harassment also has been reported. Robberies are not common in Antarctica.

Under the 1959 Antarctic Treaty, ratified by 53 nations, persons accused of a crime in Antarctica are subject to punishment by their own country.

== National laws applying to crimes in Antarctica ==
=== South Africa ===
South African citizens in Antarctica are subject to South African law under the South African Citizens in Antarctica Act, 1962. Violations of the Antarctic Treaty System are criminal offences under the Antarctic Treaties Act, 1996. Under these two acts, Antarctica is deemed to be within the jurisdiction of the magistrate's court at Cape Town.

=== United Kingdom ===
The Antarctic Act 1994 extends the laws of every part of the United Kingdom to British nationals in Antarctica. Additionally, the Commissioner of the British Antarctic Territory may enact laws for the territory.

=== United States ===
The Comprehensive Crime Control Act of 1984 (enacted 12 October 1984) covers crimes committed by Americans or crimes committed against Americans. Specifically, the act provides for the prosecution of crimes committed within the Special Maritime and Territorial Jurisdiction of the United States, which is defined as, inter alia, any crime both

- committed in a "place outside jurisdiction of any nation" (such as Antarctica), and
- by or against a national of the United States.

Although nations claim territory in Antarctica, the United States does not recognize these claims for the purposes of territorial jurisdiction. Examples proscribed conduct include murder, maiming, rape, arson, treason, and bribing a federal official.

The U.S. Marshals Service maintains a small law enforcement presence at McMurdo Station, and briefs all incoming visitors on the consequences of committing crimes.

=== New Zealand ===
The Antarctica Act 1960 describes the jurisdiction of the courts of New Zealand to deal with offences committed in the Ross Dependency and certain other parts of Antarctica.

== Sexual harassment and assault ==
The Australian Antarctic Division released an external review in 2022 revealing allegations of sexual harassment. The division director stepped down in 2023, ahead of the release of additional findings from a subsequent inquiry.

The United States Antarctic Program commissioned an external review following allegations of sexual harassment. The resulting Sexual Assault/Harassment Prevention and Response (SAHPR) report was published in 2022, highlighting issues of sexual assault and harassment, mistrust of the contracted companies, and suggesting avenues for change. In response, the US Congress Committee of Science and Technology held a session addressing the report. In 2023, The National Science Foundation Office of the Inspector General released a report titled "Law Enforcement Perspectives on Sexual Assault and Stalking Issues Pertaining to the United States Antarctic Program".

== List of crimes in Antarctica ==
- 12 April 1984: Arson. – The Almirante Brown Station (Estación Científica Almirante Brown) is an Argentine research station located on the Coughtrey Peninsula by Paradise Harbour. The station's original facilities were burned down by the station's leader and doctor on 12 April 1984 after he was ordered to stay for the winter. The station personnel were rescued by the ship Hero and taken to Palmer Station, an American research station on Anvers Island. The stations are about 58 km (36 mi) apart.
- 9 October 1996: Assault and battery. – At McMurdo Station, a cook attacked another kitchen worker with a hammer causing injuries that required 20 stitches and 5 staples in the main victim as well as five stitches for another kitchen worker who tried to break up the fight. Federal Bureau of Investigation agents made an unprecedented trip to McMurdo Station to investigate and make an arrest. The suspect was flown to Honolulu, where he faced charges of four counts of assault with a dangerous weapon. He pleaded not guilty.
- 11 May 2000: Suspicious death by poisoning. – On 11 May 2000, at the Amundsen–Scott South Pole Station, an American research station located at the South Pole, Australian astrophysicist Rodney Marks had a fever, stomach pains and nausea. He died the next day, on 12 May 2000, aged 32. It was believed at the time that Marks died of natural causes. It was the onset of winter so his body could not be removed for six months and it was put into a freezer at the observatory. After the six months were over Marks' body was flown to Christchurch, New Zealand, for an autopsy. The autopsy concluded that he had died from methanol poisoning. How the poisoning occurred remains a mystery.
- 9 October 2018: Attempted homicide. – On 9 October 2018, a stabbing occurred at the Bellingshausen Station (Russian: станция Беллинсгаузен, romanized: stantsiya Bellinsgauzen), a Russian research station on King George Island. The perpetrator was Sergey Savitsky, a 54-year-old electrical engineer. He stabbed Oleg Beloguzov, a 52-year-old welder, in the chest several times. According to some sources the attack occurred because Beloguzov was giving away the endings of books that Savitsky had taken out from the station's library. Other sources say that the attack occurred in the dining room when Beloguzov teased Savitsky by telling him that he should dance on top of the table to make money. Both accounts say that Savitsky was believed to be intoxicated at the time of the attack. They had worked together at the station for about six months and Savitsky was apparently having an emotional breakdown. Being in a confined space may have been a major cause for this (see winter-over syndrome). Both Beloguzov and Savitsky had previous problems with each other for several months. Beloguzov was sent to a hospital in Chile. Savitsky surrendered to the manager of the station and 11 days later was placed on a flight back to Russia, where he was placed under house arrest until 8 or 9 December. On 8 February 2019, Savitsky attended a preliminary hearing at the Vasileostrov District Court of Saint Petersburg. Savitsky was remorseful and was willing to accept a criminal punishment rather than rehabilitation. Beloguzov was forgiving of Savitsky and proposed dropping the case. The public prosecutor was supportive of Beloguzov's proposal and noted that Savitsky was remorseful and had no criminal record. Judge Anatoly Kovin decided to drop the case.
- 27 February 2025: Alleged assault. – A researcher at the South African SANAE IV base alleged via email that a male colleague had become mentally unstable and violent, and had physically attacked one researcher, sexually assaulted another, and planned to kill another. The scientists, who had planned to be stationed until December when the next supply ship was scheduled, asked to be rescued. In a mid-March update, South African environment minister Dion George said the alleged perpetrator was cooperating with interventions and psychological evaluation and that authorities had decided not to evacuate the 9-member team during unpredictable weather conditions. The base was "calm and under control".
- 28 June 2025: Unauthorized landing and false flight plan. – Ethan Guo, a 19-year-old American pilot and social media influencer, was charged by Chilean authorities after landing without authorization at Lieutenant Rodolfo Marsh Base on King George Island. Guo had filed a flight plan indicating he would fly only to Punta Arenas, Chile, but instead he crossed the Drake Passage and landed in Antarctica as part of a solo flight campaign across all seven continents. He was charged under Articles 194 and 197 of the Chilean Aeronautical Code for filing a false flight plan and conducting unauthorized air operations in regulated Antarctic territory. A 90-day investigation was initiated, during which Guo was ordered to remain in the Magallanes region.

== See also ==
- Demographics of Antarctica
- Religion in Antarctica
