= Harry Kirkwood =

British ice captain

Henry Kirkwood
- Born: August 9, 1910
- Died: September 25, 1977 (aged 67)
- Military career
- Allegiance: United Kingdom; New Zealand (on loan)
- Branch: Royal Navy
- Rank: Captain
- Commands: HMNZS Endeavour; John Biscoe
- Conflicts: World War II
- Awards: OBE; DSC
- Other work: Commonwealth Trans-Antarctic Expedition

Captain Henry Kirkwood OBE DSC (9 August 1910 – 25 September 1977) was one of the most experienced British ice captains. He was "loaned" from the Royal Navy to command HMNZS Endeavour (1956) on the Commonwealth Trans-Antarctic Expedition.

Kirkwood served on the Royal Research Ship Discovery II for six years before World War II, twice circumnavigating the Antarctic Continent (in Summer and Winter). He was with the rescue party which found Lincoln Ellsworth and Herbert Hollick-Kenyon when they crashed on a flight in Antarctica. He was Captain of HMNZS Endeavour (1956), an Antarctic Research support vessel, both as HMNZS Endeavour and when, as the John Biscoe, the ship belonged to the Falkland Islands Dependencies Survey.

Under the leadership of Edmund Hillary, Kirkwood landed the New Zealand section of the Commonwealth Trans-Antarctic Expedition along with the material needed to construct Scott Base. Hillary said of him "'In the beginning he looked upon us young upstarts, in the Antarctic as promising boys. I hope he believes we have learned a bit since". Reports indicate that the Expedition members found Kirkwood a difficult man to deal with. There were arguments between Captain Kirkwood and the crew, including Sir Edmund Hillary, on the crossing to Ross Island. Fuchs and others have claimed that Kirkwood was nicknamed by those on the Expedition "Harry Plywood". The nickname seems to stem from an altercation with the crew on the voyage out from England, when most of the sledging ration boxes were badly damaged by seawater from the hold. When Captain Kirkwood was challenged about this he replied "What do you expect? They're only made of plywood!" From which point on, he was known as Our Captain Plywood.

On 17 March 1958, at the end of the Expedition, Kirkwood was waiting for Vivian Fuchs, Sir Edmund Hillary and the rest of the Expedition with the Endeavour to transport them back to Wellington. Fuch's team had travelled from Shackleton to Scott Base via the South Pole (a total journey of 2,158 miles in 99 days, or 98 days if it is remembered they crossed the date line at the Pole; against the original estimate of 100 days). Fuchs commented that:

We knew one man would be particularly happy at our arrival – Captain Henry Kirkwood, RN (known to us all as 'Harry Plywood'), commanding HMNZS Endeavour, and waiting to take us to New Zealand before McMurdo Sound froze over. He told me later that, according to his calculations, we were one day late!
