= HMS Sparrow (U71) =

Modified Black Swan-class sloop

History

United Kingdom
- Name: Sparrow
- Namesake: Sparrow
- Ordered: 8 December 1942
- Builder: William Denny and Brothers, Dumbarton
- Laid down: 30 November 1944
- Launched: 18 February 1946
- Commissioned: 16 December 1946
- Decommissioned: 1953
- Identification: Pennant number: U71
- Fate: Scrapped in 1957

General characteristics
- Class & type: Modified Black Swan-class sloop
- Displacement: 1,350 tons
- Length: 283 ft (86 m)
- Beam: 38.5 ft (11.7 m)
- Propulsion: Geared turbines; two shafts
- Speed: 20 knots (37 km/h) at 4,300 hp (3,200 kW)
- Complement: 192 men
- Armament: 6 × QF 4 in Mk XVI anti-aircraft guns; 12 × 20 mm anti-aircraft guns

HMS Sparrow was a modified Black Swan-class sloop of the Royal Navy. She was laid down by William Denny and Brothers, Dumbarton on 30 November 1944, launched on 16 February 1946 and commissioned on 16 December 1946, with the pennant number U71.

== Design ==
The modified Black Swans were 299 ft 6 in (91.29 m) long overall and 283 ft 0 in (86.26 m) between perpendiculars, with a beam of 38 feet 6 inches (11.73 m) and a draught of 11 ft 4 in (3.45 m) at deep load. Displacement was 1,350–1,490 long tons (1,370–1,510 t) standard and 1,880–1,950 long tons (1,910–1,980 t) deep load depending on the armament and equipment fitted. Two Admiralty three-drum water-tube boilers provided steam to Parsons geared steam turbines which drove two shafts. The machinery was rated at 4,300 shp (3,200 kW), giving a speed of 19.75 kn (22.73 mph; 36.58 km/h).

The ship's main gun armament (as fitted to all the Modified Black Swans) consisted of 3 twin QF 4 inch (102 mm) Mk XVI guns, in dual purpose mounts, capable of both anti-ship and anti-aircraft use. Close-in anti-aircraft armament varied between the ships of the class, with Sparrow completing with two twin and four single 40 mm Bofors guns. Anti-submarine armament consisted of four depth-charge throwers and two rails, giving a 10-charge pattern set at two depths, with 110 depth charges carried. The Modified Black Swans had a crew of 192 officers and other ranks.

== Construction and service ==
Sparrow was originally planned to be built in the Royal Navy's 1940 Supplemental shipbuilding programme, by the Clydebank shipbuilder John Brown & Company, but this order was cancelled, and Sparrow and sister ship Snipe were re-ordered from William Denny and Brothers on 8 December 1942. The ship was laid down at Denny's Dumbarton shipyard on 30 November 1944, was launched on 18 February 1946 and completed on 16 December 1946, the last ship of her class to be built. She was allocated the Pennant number U71, which changed to F71 in 1947, when Sparrow, like all other sloops in the Royal Navy, was redesignated as a frigate. The ship was the seventh ship named Sparrow to serve with the Royal Navy.

Following workup, Sparrow joined sister ship Snipe on the North America and West Indies Station in February 1947. In March–April 1948, Sparrow took part in joint exercises in the Caribbean between the America and West Indies Squadron (Sparrow and the cruiser Sheffield) and ships of the Royal Canadian Navy (the cruiser Ontario and the destroyers Nootka and Crescent). In June 1948, Sparrow was ordered to sail from Bermuda to British Guiana in response to civil unrest. In December 1948, Sparrow carried out a cruise around British Antarctic Territories in conjunction with the Falkland Islands Dependencies Survey (FIDS) survey ship RRS John Biscoe. In January 1949, Sparrow left Port Stanley in the Falkland Islands to deliver supplies to Antarctic bases, but after arriving at Admiralty Bay in the South Shetland Islands on 27 January, was trapped there by advancing pack ice from the Weddell Sea, and had to wait until John Biscoe cut clear a path through the ice before the frigate could return to the Falklands.

Sparrow then returned to Britain for a refit at Devonport Dockyard, which was completed on 27 July 1949, after which the frigate returned to the West Indies. Sparrow was again refitted in the UK in March 1951. After Hurricane Charlie struck Jamaica in August 1951, Sparrow and the frigate Bigbury Bay assisted in relief work.

Sparrow saw action during the Korean War.

== Bibliography ==
- Colledge, J. J.; Warlow, Ben (2006). Ships of the Royal Navy: The Complete Record of all Fighting Ships of the Royal Navy from the 15th Century to the Present. London: Chatham Publishing. ISBN 978-1-86176-281-8.
- Critchley, Mike (1992). British Warships Since 1945: Part 5: Frigates. Liskeard, UK: Maritime Books. ISBN 0-907771-13-0.
- Friedman, Norman (2008). British Destroyers and Frigates: The Second World War and After. Barnsley, UK: Seaforth Publishing. ISBN 978-1-84832-015-4.
- Gardiner, Robert; Chesneau, Roger, eds. (1980). Conway's All the World's Fighting Ships 1922–1946. London: Conway Maritime Press. ISBN 0-85177-146-7.
- Hague, Arnold (1993). Sloops: A History of the 71 Sloops Built in Britain and Australia for the British, Australian and Indian Navies 1926–1946. Kendal, England: World Ship Society. ISBN 0-905617-67-3.
