= Båkenesdokka Valley =

Valley in Queen Maud Land, Antarctica

Båkenesdokka Valley (71°26′S 3°3′W) is an ice-filled valley at the east side of Roberts Knoll, draining north to Jelbart Ice Shelf in Queen Maud Land. It was mapped by Norwegian cartographers from surveys and from air photos by the Norwegian-British-Swedish Antarctic Expedition (1949–52) and named "Båkenesdokka" (the "beacon cape depression").
