= Hope Bay incident =

1952 Argentine-British incident in Antarctica

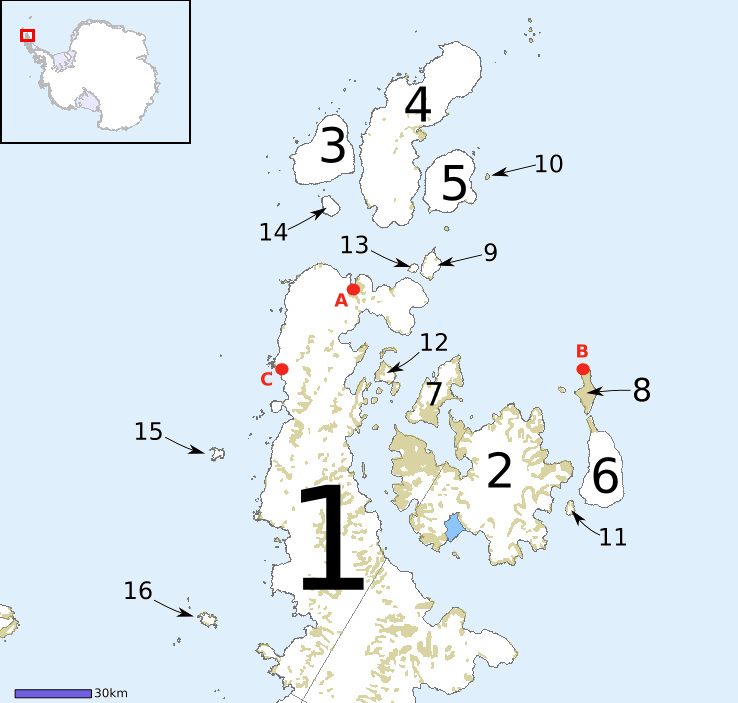
Antarctic peninsula islands. Hope Bay is at letter 'A' at the top of the Antarctic Peninsula

The Hope Bay incident occurred in February 1952 at Hope Bay on the Antarctic Peninsula. It involved an Argentine naval party from a nearby onshore base and a British landing party from the survey ship John Biscoe.

== Background ==
During the 19th century there had been increasing interest by various countries in the uninhabited, largely unexplored, and unclaimed continent of Antarctica and its many off-shore islands. The United Kingdom was first to lay formal claim, which it did in letters patent of 1908. This defined the boundaries of areas it claimed as dependencies of its Falkland Islands colony. One dependency was Graham Land on the Antarctic Peninsula, at the northern tip of which is Hope Bay. Chile, in 1940, was next to define its claimed areas of Antarctica, and Argentina established its claim in several stages between 1940 and 1947. The claims of all three countries, including to the Antarctic Peninsula, overlapped. The United States was also showing an interest in laying its own claim to the same area.

In 1943, Britain began establishing bases in the region to protect Allied shipping using the Drake Passage from attacks by German raiders during the Second World War. This coincided with attempts by Argentina, a country sympathetic to Germany, and to a lesser extent by Chile, to establish bases of their own to strengthen their claims to this section of Antarctica. This led to a series of incidents on the Antarctic Peninsula and the out-lying islands which continued after the end of the war.

== The incident ==
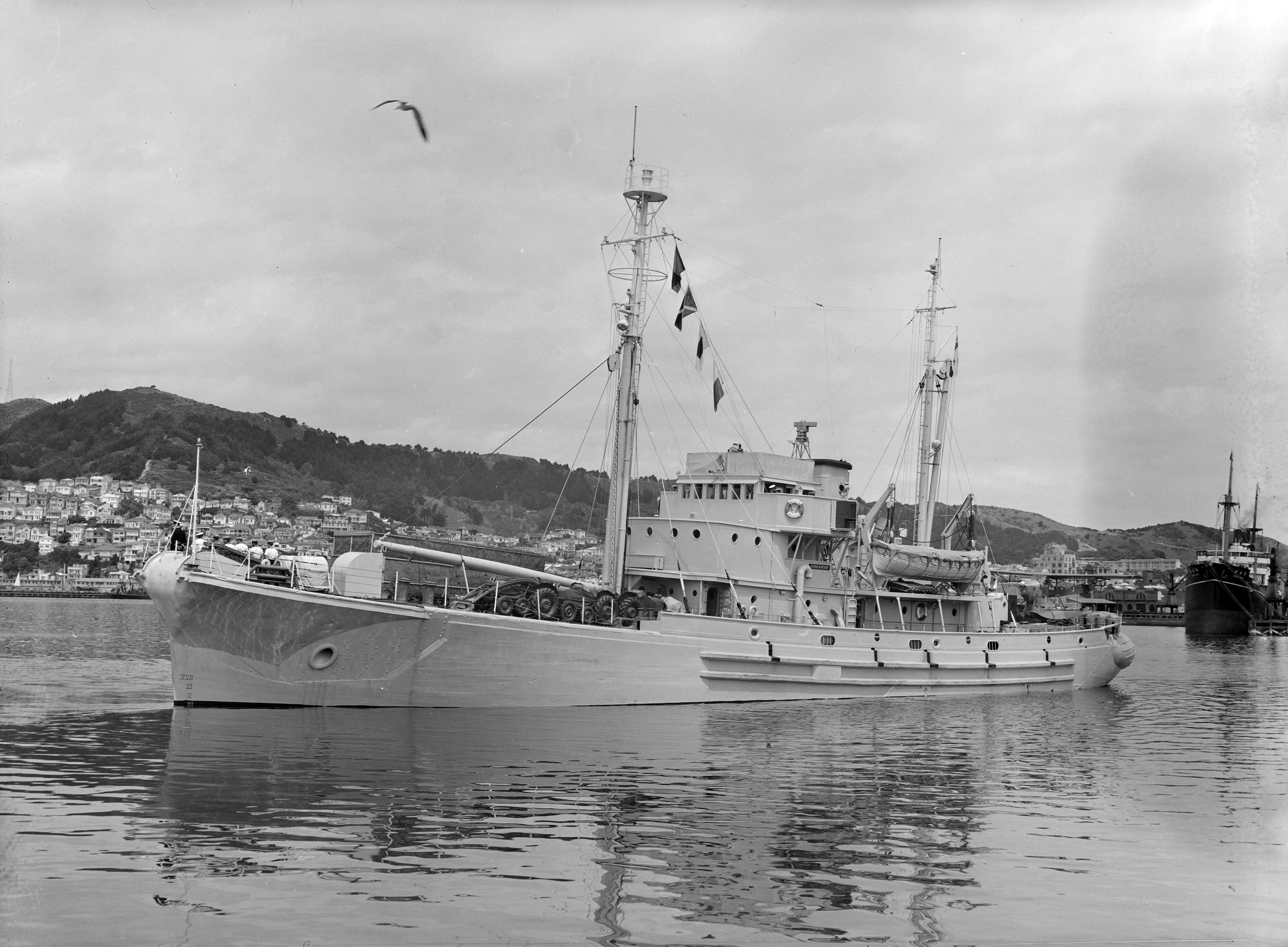
SV John Biscoe (as HMNZS Endeavour in Wellington Harbour in 1956)

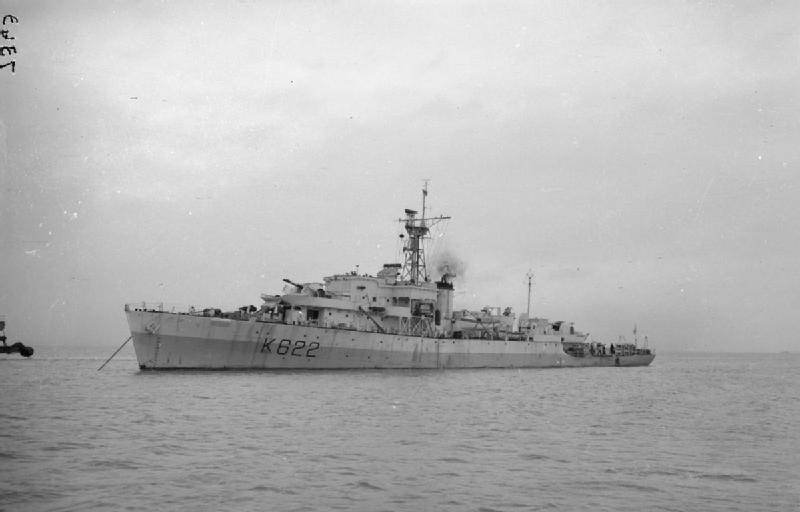
HMS Burghead Bay in 1945

In 1948, a British research base at Hope Bay was destroyed by fire and subsequently abandoned. It was operated by the Falkland Islands Dependencies Survey (FIDS). Soon afterwards, a staffed Argentine base was established a few hundred metres away from the abandoned British base. In February 1952, the FIDS survey ship, John Biscoe, arrived with equipment and stores to rebuild the fire-damaged base. The Argentines warned off the landing party, firing a machine gun over their heads, and the landing party then withdrew back to the John Biscoe, which returned to the Falklands. The Governor of the Falkland Islands, Sir Miles Clifford, sent a telegram to the Colonial Office in London, saying: "this presumably constitutes an act of war". Without waiting for a reply, and ignoring existing Foreign Office instructions to the contrary, he boarded the frigate HMS Burghead Bay and, with an accompanying detachment of marines, escorted the John Biscoe back to Hope Bay, where they arrived on 4 February. The show of strength forced the Argentines to retreat and provided protection while the British base was rebuilt.

== Aftermath ==
The Argentine authorities had already issued an apology in the aftermath of the 1 February eviction of British personnel and said the commander at the base had exceeded his authority. However, the real reason behind the incident was its likely propaganda value, as part of the Argentinian leader Juan Peron's nationalist Antarctic Dream. When the Argentine base was relieved, Peron greeted the members of Esperanza Detachment with a hero's welcome.

On 7 February, while at Hope Bay, Burghead Bay ran aground in bad weather, re-floated and departed for Port Stanley, arriving on 11 February. This mishap resulted in a court martial in November 1952.

== See also ==
- Operation Tabarin
- Military activity in the Antarctic
- Deception Island incident
