= Time in Argentina =

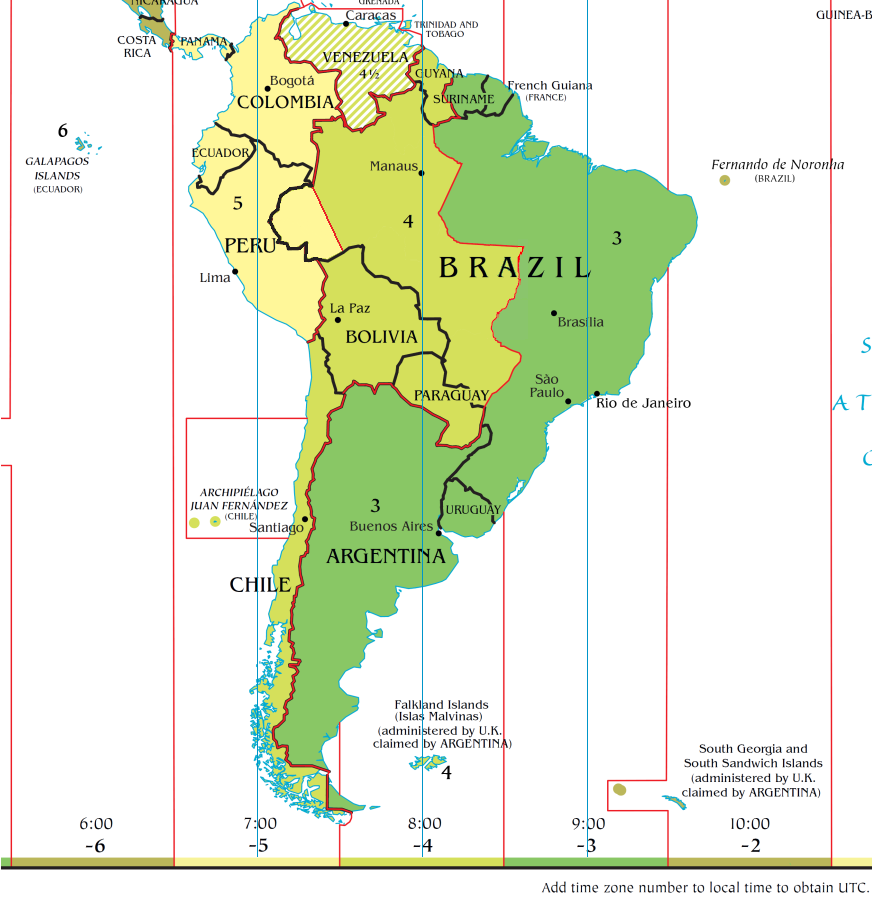
Time zone map of South America

Argentina is located at a longitude that would naturally put it in the UTC−04:00 or UTC−05:00 time zone; however, it actually uses the UTC−03:00 time zone. Argentina determines whether to change clocks in observation of daylight saving time on a year-by-year basis, and individual provinces may opt out of the federal decision. At present, Argentina does not change clocks.

The Argentine Hydrographic Service maintains the official national time.

== History ==
The first official standardization of time in Argentina took place on 31 October 1894, with establishment of UTC−04:00 as the nation's standard time. From 1920 to 1969, the official time switched biannually between UTC−04:00 as standard time in winter and UTC−03:00 as daylight saving time in summer. From 1974 to 1993, clocks advanced again, such that the official time switched biannually between UTC−03:00 as winter DST and UTC−02:00 as summer double DST. In 1993, the national time was fixed at UTC−03:00, called Argentina Time (ART; Spanish: hora oficial argentina, HOA). In 2007 and 2008, biannual switching between UTC−3:00 (winter DST) and UTC−2:00 (summer DST) resumed; in 2009, this was replaced again with year-round UTC−3:00 (permanent DST).

== IANA time zone database ==
In the file zone.tab of the IANA time zone database Argentina has the following zones:

C.c.*	Coordinates*	TZ*	Comments*	UTC offset	UTC offset DST	Map
AR	−3436−05827	America/Argentina/Buenos_Aires	Buenos Aires (BA, CF)	−03:00	−03:00	
AR	−3124−06411	America/Argentina/Cordoba	most areas: CB, CC, CN, ER, FM, MN, SE, SF	−03:00	−03:00	
AR	−2447−06525	America/Argentina/Salta	Salta (SA, LP, NQ, RN)	−03:00	−03:00	
AR	−2411−06518	America/Argentina/Jujuy	Jujuy (JY)	−03:00	−03:00	
AR	−2649−06513	America/Argentina/Tucuman	Tucumán (TM)	−03:00	−03:00	
AR	−2828−06547	America/Argentina/Catamarca	Catamarca (CT), Chubut (CH)	−03:00	−03:00	
AR	−2926−06651	America/Argentina/La_Rioja	La Rioja (LR)	−03:00	−03:00	
AR	−3132−06831	America/Argentina/San_Juan	San Juan (SJ)	−03:00	−03:00	
AR	−3253−06849	America/Argentina/Mendoza	Mendoza (MZ)	−03:00	−03:00	
AR	−3319−06621	America/Argentina/San_Luis	San Luis (SL)	−03:00	−03:00	
AR	−5138−06913	America/Argentina/Rio_Gallegos	Santa Cruz (SC)	−03:00	−03:00	
AR	−5448−06818	America/Argentina/Ushuaia	Tierra del Fuego (TF)	−03:00	−03:00	

== Full History ==
Full history of time zone changes since 1920 (Note: Date format: DD-MM-YYYY)
From the start of the day	Adopted time zone	Until the end of the day
01-05-1920	−4	30-11-1930
01-12-1930	−3	31-03-1931
01-04-1931	−4	14-10-1931
15-10-1931	−3	29-02-1932
01-03-1932	−4	31-10-1932
01-11-1932	−3	29-02-1933
01-03-1933	−4	31-10-1933
01-11-1933	−3	28-02-1934
01-03-1934	−4	31-10-1934
01-11-1934	−3	28-02-1935
01-03-1935	−4	31-10-1935
01-11-1935	−3	29-02-1936
01-03-1936	−4	31-10-1936
01-11-1936	−3	28-02-1937
01-03-1937	−4	31-10-1937
01-11-1937	−3	28-02-1938
01-03-1938	−4	31-10-1938
01-11-1938	−3	28-02-1939
01-03-1939	−4	31-10-1939
01-11-1939	−3	29-02-1940
01-03-1940	−4	30-06-1940
01-07-1940	−3	14-06-1941
15-06-1941	−4	14-10-1941
15-10-1941	−3	31-07-1943
01-08-1943	−4	14-10-1943
15-10-1943	−3	28-02-1946
01-03-1946	−4	30-09-1946
01-10-1946	−3	30-09-1963
01-10-1963	−4	14-12-1963
15-12-1963	−3	29-02-1964
01-03-1964	−4	14-10-1964
15-10-1964	−3	28-02-1965
01-03-1965	−4	14-10-1965
15-10-1965	−3	28-02-1966
01-03-1966	−4	14-10-1966
15-10-1966	−3	01-04-1967
02-04-1967	−4	30-09-1967
01-10-1967	−3	06-04-1968
07-04-1968	−4	05-10-1968
06-10-1968	−3	05-04-1969
06-04-1969	−4	04-10-1969
05-10-1969	−3	22-01-1974
23-01-1974	−2	30-04-1974
01-05-1974	−3	30-11-1988
01-12-1988	−2	04-03-1989
05-03-1989	−3	14-10-1989
15-10-1989	−2	03-03-1990
04-03-1990	−3	20-10-1990
21-10-1990	−2	02-03-1991
03-03-1991	−3	19-10-1991
20-10-1991	−2	29-02-1992
01-03-1992	−3	17-10-1992
18-10-1992	−2	06-03-1993
07-03-1993	−3	29-12-2007
30-12-2007	−2	15-03-2008
16-03-2008	−3	18-10-2008
19-10-2008	−2	14-03-2009 (Note: Catamarca, Chubut, Jujuy, La Pampa, La Rioja, Mendoza, Neuquén, Río Negro, Salta, San Juan, San Luis, Santa Cruz and Tierra del Fuego, Antártida e Islas del Atlántico Sur, continued using −3 time zone.)
15-03-2009	−3	until the present
