= Arctic sanctuary =

Proposed marine protected area around the North Pole

Arctic sanctuary was a proposed marine protected area around the North Pole. As of 2016, 4.7% of the Arctic marine area is protected. The marine sanctuary is seen to be an important aspect of an international treaty that can act for the protection of the Arctic region, and to maintain the region's pristinity.

== Nature of the sanctuary ==
There has been discussions about the non-existence of international legal agreements or rules for creating marine protected areas in areas that are beyond national jurisdiction. This has resulted in the consideration of whether to create such agreements, and how an Arctic sanctuary can be created within the existing constraints.

In 2008, the European Parliament referred to the possibility:

…of an international treaty for the protection of the Arctic, having as its inspiration the Antarctic Treaty, as supplemented by the Madrid Protocol signed in 1991, but respecting the fundamental difference represented by the populated nature of the Arctic and the consequent rights and needs of the peoples and nations of the Arctic region; believes, however, that as a minimum starting-point such a treaty could at least cover the unpopulated and unclaimed area at the centre of the Arctic Ocean.

The European Parliament, on its 2014 resolution, dated October 9, suggested that Arctic be declared a nuclear-free zone. The resolution recognised the responsibility of all government and citizens worldwide to protect the Arctic. The resolution also communicated that "the waters around the Arctic are international waters and calls for the establishment of a global sanctuary in waters outside the exclusive economic zones of the Arctic coastal states to be agreed and respected by both Arctic and non-Arctic countries."

== Citizen support ==
Arctic sanctuary has received support from people of many countries, including those bordering the arctic such as Canada and Russia, but also others in Europe, Asia, South America, and Africa.

== See also ==
- Tuvaijuittuq Marine Protected Area - near the North Pole but within Canadian territorial waters, established 2019
