= Royal Commission on Nuclear Power Generation in New Zealand =

New Zealand group which investigated nuclear power generation

The Royal Commission on Nuclear Power Generation in New Zealand was set up in 1976 and reported back to the Government in 1978. The report concluded that there was no immediate need to generate electric power by nuclear means but it may be economically possible in the 21st century.

== See also ==
- Anti-nuclear movement in New Zealand
- Environment of New Zealand
