= ARA Cormorán =

Argentine Navy survey ship

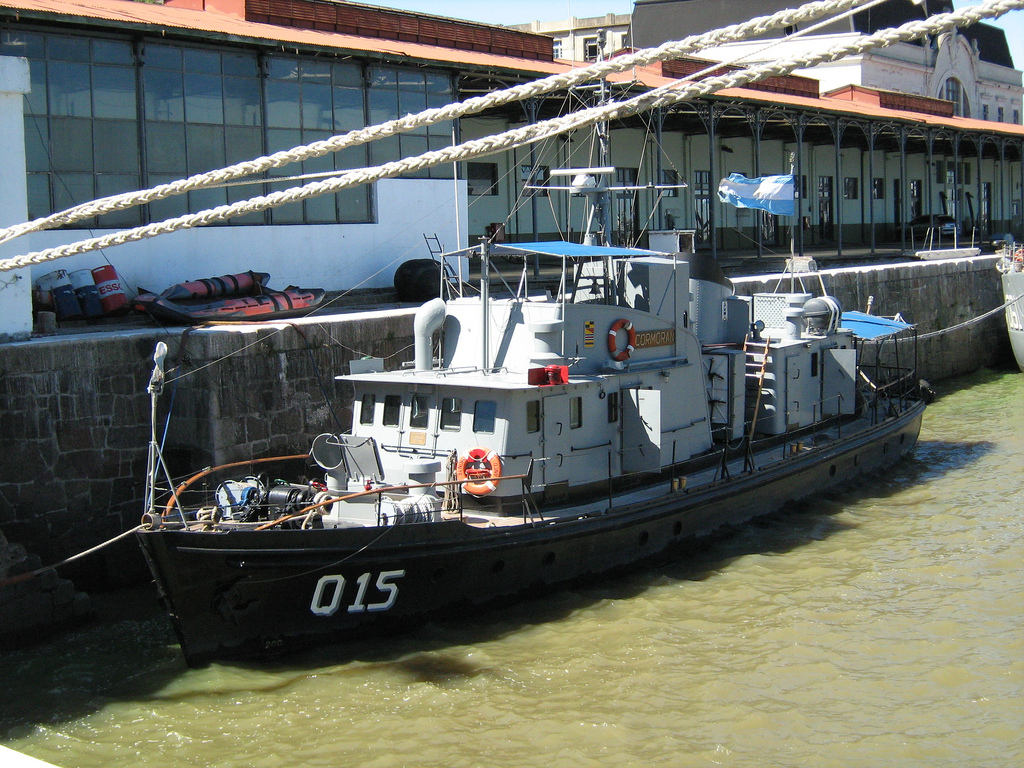
- ARA Cormorán at anchor, Buenos Aires, 2009

History

Argentina
- Name: Cormorán
- Namesake: Cormorant, an aquatic bird from Argentina’s littoral.
- Builder: AFNE Rio Santiago, Argentina
- Commissioned: 1964
- Identification: MMSI number: 701104732; Callsign: LOCD
- Status: In service

General characteristics
- Type: Hydrographic survey vessel
- Displacement: 102 tons
- Length: 25.3 m (83.0 ft)
- Beam: 5 m (16.4 ft)
- Draft: 1.8 m (5.9 ft)
- Propulsion: 2-shaft, 2 × Diesel engines, 440 hp (330 kW)
- Speed: 11 knots (13 mph; 20 km/h)
- Complement: 21
- Notes: Career and characteristics data from “Histarmar”.

ARA Cormorán (Q-15) is a hydrographic survey boat of the Argentine Navy, built in the Río Santiago Shipyard and based in Buenos Aires. The vessel is named after the cormorant, a seabird that inhabits Argentina’s littoral, and is the fourth Argentine naval ship with this name.

== Design ==
Cormorán is a coastal and fluvial research ship designed by the engineering team at Río Santiago Shipyard, where it was built. Its hull has a metallic structure covered with cedar wooden planks, and its superstructure is made of aluminium.

It is powered by two diesel engines driving two propellers, and has a Decca TM 1226 navigation radar.

== History ==
Cormorán was built in the Río Santiago Shipyard. Commissioned by the Argentine Navy in February 1964, she was assigned to the Naval Hydrographic Service ((in Spanish) Servicio de Hidrografía Naval).

Since then she has undertaken several campaigns, which included depth sounding, current measuring, water sampling and bottom sampling.

In 2010 she supported the hydrographic surveys performed in the Río de la Plata by the Uruguayan ship ROU Sirius.

In 2012 she surveyed the inner Río de la Plata, and in 2013 sounded the rivers Paraná Ibicuy and Paraná Pavón; during 2014 she surveyed the Magdalena Channel of the Río de la Plata.

== See also ==
- List of auxiliary ships of the Argentine Navy
