= Small nucleolar RNA SNORA71 =

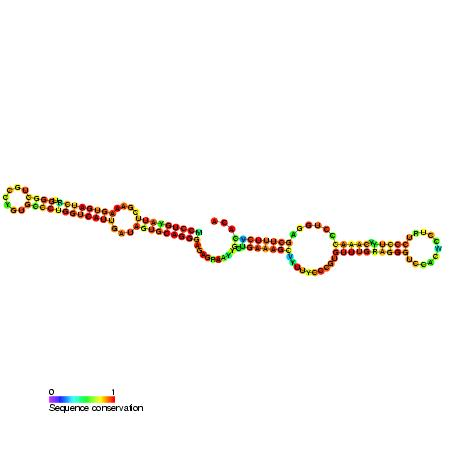
- Predicted secondary structure and sequence conservation of SNORA71

Identifiers
- Symbol: SNORA71
- Alt. Symbols: U71
- Rfam: RF00056

Other data
- RNA type: Gene; snRNA; snoRNA; H/ACA-box
- Domain: Eukaryota
- GO: GO:0006396 GO:0005730
- SO: SO:0000594
- PDB structures: PDBe

In molecular biology, U71 belongs to the H/ACA class of Small nucleolar RNA (snoRNAs). snoRNAs bind a number of proteins (including dyskerin, Gar1p and Nop10p in the case of the H/ACA class) to form snoRNP complexes. This class are thought to guide the sites of modification of uridines to pseudouridines by forming direct base pairing interactions with substrate RNAs. Targets may include ribosomal and spliceosomal RNAs but the exact function of many snoRNAs, including U71, is unclear.
