= Roberts Knoll =

Roberts Knoll (71°27′S 3°15′W) is a snow-covered coastal knoll with numerous rock outcrops at the east side of the mouth of Schytt Glacier in Queen Maud Land. It was mapped by Norwegian cartographers from surveys and air photos by the Norwegian-British-Swedish Antarctic Expedition (NBSAE) (1949–52) and named for Brian B. Roberts, Secretary of the United Kingdom Antarctic Place-names Committee.

== See also ==
- Båkenesdokka Valley
