= Agreed Measures for the Conservation of Antarctic Fauna and Flora =

Set of environmental protection measures

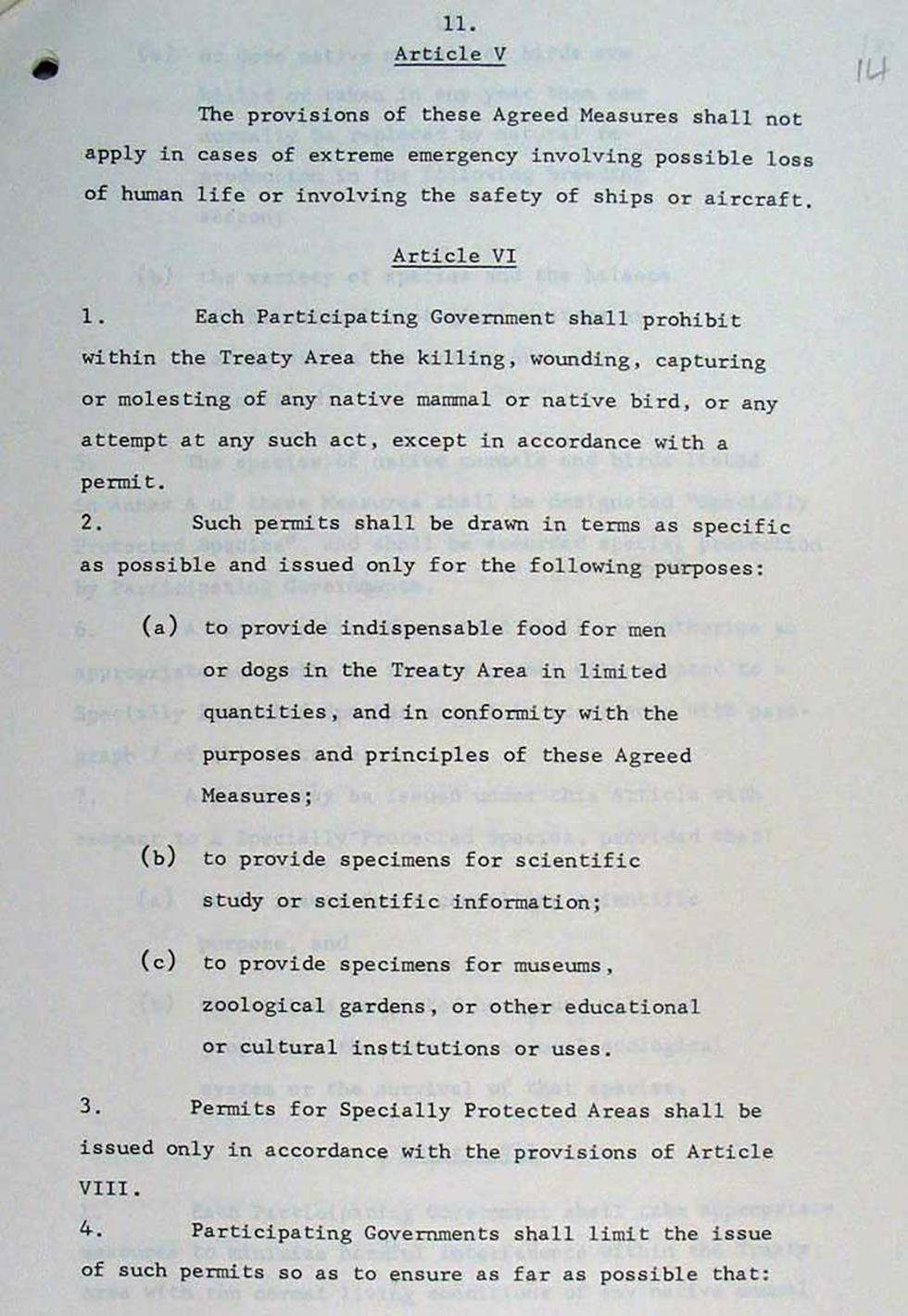
- A page of the Agreed Measures from the National Archives of Australia
- Signed: 2 June 1964
- Location: Brussels
- Effective: 1 November 1982
- Condition: ratification by Argentina, Australia, Belgium, Chile, France, Japan, New Zealand, Norway, South Africa, the Soviet Union, the United Kingdom and the United States
- Expiration: 2011
- Parties: 21
- Depositary: United States of America

Full text
- Agreed Measures for the Conservation of Antarctic Fauna and Flora at Wikisource

The Agreed Measures for the Conservation of Antarctic Fauna and Flora is a set of environmental protection measures which were accepted at the third Antarctic Treaty Consultative Meeting in Brussels in 1964. The Agreed Measures were formally in force as part of the Antarctic Treaty System from 1982 to 2011, when they were withdrawn as the principles were now entirely superseded by later agreements such as the 1991 Protocol on Environmental Protection to the Antarctic Treaty. The Agreed Measures were adopted in order to further international collaboration within the administration of the Antarctic Treaty System and promote the protection of natural Antarctic ecological systems while enabling scientific study and exploration.

The Agreed Measures were the first attempts under the Treaty to prioritise wildlife conservation and environmental protection. This was needed due to increasing human interest in exploration, science, and fishing, which had put pressure on natural flora and fauna. They proved successful, and led the way for more stringent environmental protection in future.

== History ==
Antarctic interests in the late 1940s were increasing, with nations fighting over territory in the Antarctic Peninsula region. Fear of open conflict from these nations, as well as fear of Antarctica becoming involved in the Cold War between the United States and the Soviet Union, led to the first discussions of Antarctic diplomacy and treaties. This led to the negotiations of the Antarctic Treaty in 1959 in which the International Geophysical Year Antarctic Program met to discuss scientific papers from 12 participating nations, regarding Antarctic science and research. The 12 nations in attendance were also members of the Scientific Committee on Antarctic Research (SCAR) which was founded one year prior in 1958. SCAR was formulated as an international association of biologists and other scientists interested in Antarctic research, and included Argentina, Australia, Belgium, Chile, France, Japan, New Zealand, Norway, South Africa, United Kingdom, United States, and USSR. The formation of SCAR and the Antarctic Treaty enabled scientists to advocate for conservation efforts and policy in Antarctica, leading to the first discussions of establishing the Agreed Measures for the Conservation of Antarctic Fauna and Flora.

The International Geophysical Year Antarctic Program was the beginning of concerns for Antarctic wildlife, as the geophysical scientists' efforts to explore Antarctica proved to be inadvertently harming Antarctic flora and fauna. Biologists were calling for awareness that Antarctica was not a lifeless tundra, but in fact had wildlife that was extremely vulnerable to human interference. SCAR secretary Gordon Robin published a paper for fellow scientist Robert Carrick in the SCAR Bulletin to bring further awareness to the requirement of conservation in Antarctica. Carrick, along with other prominent scientists, William J. L. Sladen, Robert Falla, Carl Eklund, Jean Prevost and Robert Cushman Murphy to name a few, were among the loudest contributors to SCAR's position of conservation.

As these scientists had all specialised in the area of birds, their first action towards Antarctic conservation occurred at the 1960 International Council for Bird Preservation in which they called specifically for protection of Antarctic birds. After this, SCAR continued to have a large voice in advocating Antarctic conservation, with Robert Carrick speaking at the Fourth SCAR meeting in 1960 to address specific reasons why conservation was necessary as well as providing recommendations for legislation. Following these meetings, SCAR supplied the parties of the Antarctic Treaty with their report, and it was from there that the first talks of the Agreed Measures began amongst Antarctic Treaty System members.

== Negotiations ==
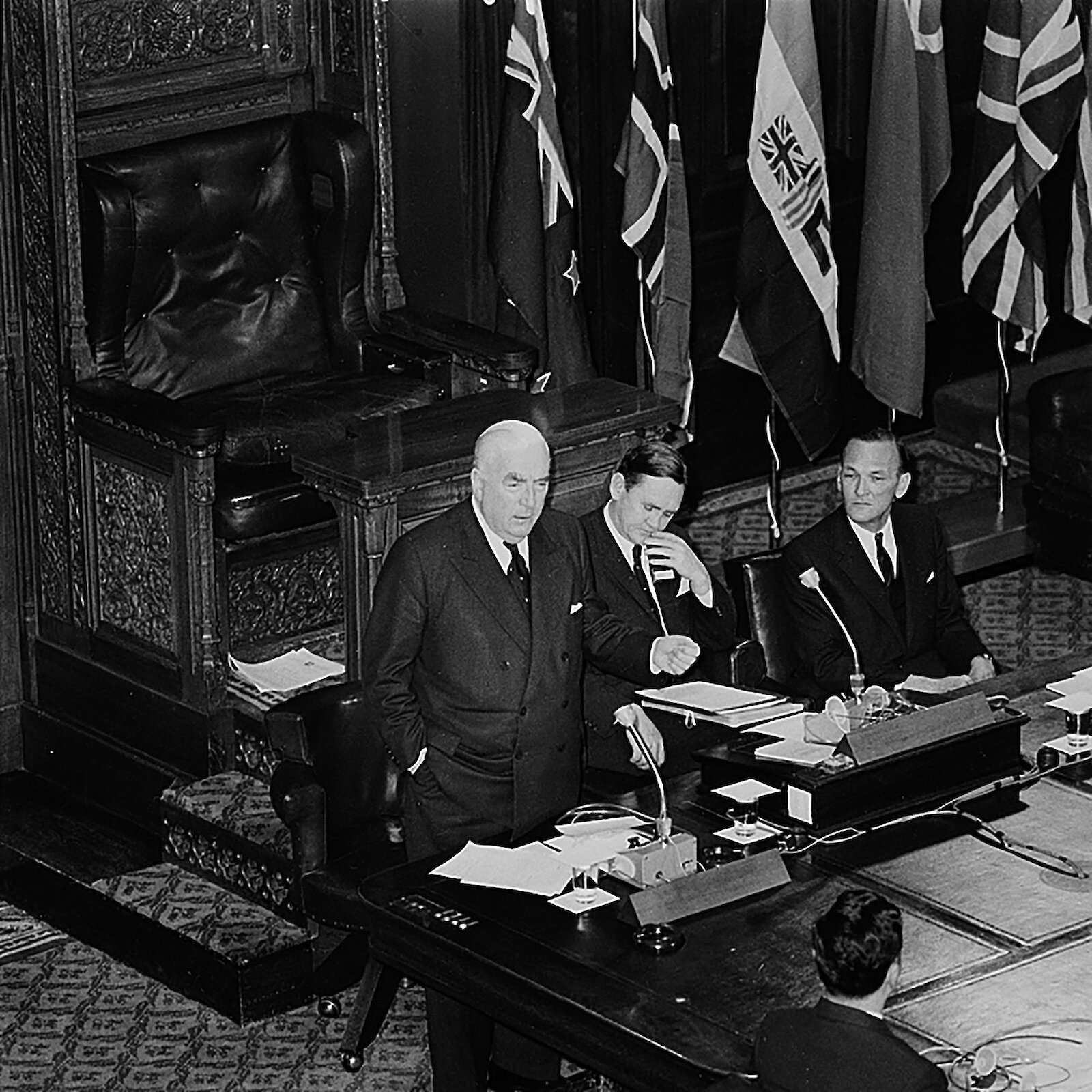
Prime Minister Menzies (left) and the Minister for the Navy, John Gorton (right), at Parliament House in Canberra 1961, at the first Antarctic Treaty Consultative Meeting.

In January 1960, the U.S. representative for the Antarctic Treaty, Paul Daniels, asked that conservation be formally discussed at the first Antarctic Treaty Consultative Meeting. After this, US participation declined, and the British government was the only strong advocate for conservation. Brian Roberts from the Foreign Office began calling for a separate Convention for Antarctic conservation. At the first Antarctic Treaty Consultative Meeting at Canberra in 1961, parties agreed that some form of conservation effort was required, and implemented Recommendation I-VIII; a very broad set of interim guidelines which incorporated much of the SCAR report. Following this meeting, Roberts continued pushing for a formal agreement and drafted a full Convention to present to the other parties. On 6 June 1963 all the parties convened to discuss three position papers for conservation: the British draft, and the responses to said draft by Chile and the Soviet Union. In September 1963, the US representatives released their own draft titled the "Agreed Measures" rather than a Convention, and incorporated the preamble from the Soviets and much of the British draft with small changes in specific terminology. The US argued that a Measures would be better than a separate Convention as the Measures would fall under the authority of the Antarctic Treaty and share the same administrations.

At the third Antarctic Treaty Consultative Meeting at Brussels in June 1964, the Agreed Measures were passed as Recommendation VIII. Despite this, it took 18 years before they were effective in 1982 after Japan was the final country to sign them. The 12 countries required to sign for the measures to be effective, were the same 12 who had formulated SCAR; Argentina, Australia, Belgium, Chile, France, Japan, New Zealand, Norway, South Africa, United Kingdom, United States, and the Soviet Union. During the 18 years interim, parties behaved as though the measures were in force, with all of Antarctica being considered a "Special Conservation Area".

== Summary of the Agreed Measures ==
The Agreed Measures for the Conservation of Antarctic Fauna and Flora consisted of fourteen articles, of which four were simply formalities. The Measures applied to land areas south of latitude 60°S which fell under the jurisdiction of the Antarctic Treaty. In Article I it was explicitly stated that this was with the exception of high seas areas which remain under international law. The first article also included provisions to ensure all Annexes to the Agreed Measures were considered a part of the measures themselves. A participating government could only be exempt from these Measures in "extreme circumstances", such as involving the potential loss of human life or an event which may jeopardise the welfare of large vessels such as ships and aircraft. The Agreed Measures strictly prohibited attempted killing, harming, or capturing of native mammals or birds without permit in Article VI, and in Article VIII it prohibited driving of vehicles and collecting native flora without permit. In both cases, a permit would only be supplied with "compelling scientific purpose" and assurance that ecology would not be endangered by these actions. The permits for these activities had specific terms and were only provided to a participating government in the case of limited food quantities for humans or dogs, for scientific research or to provide specimens for education. Article VI also instructed that permits had to be restricted in number by participating governments to ensure that native species were not killed more than can be compensated naturally in the year.

The Agreed Measures also set out to prevent harmful interference of native conditions in Article VII, and provided a detailed list of activities deemed harmful. These activities included eliciting loud sounds near wildlife, flying aircraft too close to wildlife, allowing dogs to run free, and excessive human disturbance during breeding periods. Article VI also stated that participating governments must take appropriate actions to prevent pollution of waters. Most notably, the Agreed Measures designated all applied areas as "Specially Protected Areas" in Article VIII, to emphasise the vulnerability of native Antarctic flora and fauna. In addition, the introduction of non-indigenous flora and fauna was prohibited in Article IX unless supported by a permit and was a species approved by Annex C. This did not include flora and fauna imported for the use of food, as long as it did not threaten Antarctic ecosystems. This section also highlighted the role of each participating government in preventing introduction of disease, with Annex D citing a list of precautions to prevent this. The Agreed Measures also established a framework for participating governments to communicate and share data on native Antarctic bird and mammal species in Article XII. This included information on how many numbers of each species had been killed or captured annually under a permit for use as food, or scientific study. This communication ensured transparency and allowed participating governments to determine the level of protection each native species required to protect and preserve Antarctic flora and fauna.

== Ratification ==
The convention was ratified both by members whose ratification was required for entry into force as by others. A list is shown:

Country	Date	Required for entry into force
Argentina	September 3, 1965	Yes
Australia	September 1, 1980	Yes
Belgium	January 25, 1978	Yes
Brazil	October 27, 1986	No
Chile	November 23, 1970	Yes
China	December 11, 1985	No
France	September 20, 1972	Yes
Germany	February 17, 1981	No
India	March 7, 1988	No
Italy	April 22, 1987	No
Japan	January 19, 1965	Yes
New Zealand	December 23, 1971	Yes
Norway	December 1, 1965	Yes
Poland	July 11, 1977	No
South Africa	October 5, 1964	Yes
South Korea	May 10, 1995	No
Soviet Union	February 20, 1965	Yes
Spain	April 8, 1988	No
United Kingdom	September 10, 1968	Yes
United States	July 31, 1979	Yes
Uruguay	October 10, 1989	No

== Other Agreements ==
=== Convention for the Conservation of Antarctic Seals ===
The Agreed Measures for the Conservation of Antarctic Fauna and Flora, only covered land areas south of latitude 60°S, and thus there was no measure in place for protection on the sea or floating ice. This was despite the efforts of Robert Carrick and the Australian party, who advocated strongly for this to be included in the Agreed Measures, to protect animals who spend most of their lives on pack ice or in the seas surrounding Antarctica. This issue was rectified by the signing of the Convention for the Conservation of Antarctic Seals in 1972, and was the first treaty in the wake of the Agreed Measures.

=== Convention on the Conservation of Antarctic Marine Living Resources ===
In 1975 at the Eighth Antarctic Treaty Consultative Meeting, they adopted Recommendation VIII-10 to protect marine life, which were excluded from the scope of the Agreed Measures. This issue had become increasingly urgent due to extensive fishing practices and overfishing of Antarctic krill which had become popular in the late 1960s to mid-1970s. In 1978 they held a Conference on the Conservation of Antarctic Marine Living Resources which resulted in the signing of the Convention for the Conservation of Antarctic Marine Living Resources (CCAMLR) in 1980. This was the world's first conservation agreement which protected the ecosystem (marine life) rather than an individual species such as seals.

=== Bilateral Treaties ===
Many updated measures were put in to place addressing similar issues of the Agreed Measures at Antarctic Treaty Consultative Meetings such as Article 3.2 and The Annex II to the Protocol on Environmental Protection to the Antarctic Treaty. The Protocol, otherwise known as the "Madrid Protocol" was set into effect in 1998, and prohibited mining or mineral resource activity in Antarctica. Article 3.2 is similar to the Agreed Measures as it prevents harm to natural Antarctic wildlife. Annex II also relates to the Agreed Measures by banning harmful interference and introduction of parasites or foreign species without permit as well as defining Specially Protected Areas and Species. Annex V of the Environmental Protocol followed that of the Agreed Measures, by designating "Specially Protected Areas" in Antarctica, and was adopted separately in 1991 and in force from 2002 onwards. In contrast to the Agreed Measures, Annex V also designated marine areas to be included within the scope of "Antarctic Specially Protected Areas". In fact, Annex V added several different layers of protection for Antarctic land areas, by introducing "Antarctic Specially Protected Areas", "Antarctic Specially Managed Areas" and "Historic Sites and Monuments". As with the Agreed Measures, "Antarctic Specially Protected Areas", was defined by Annex V of the Environmental Protocol as an area protected to maintain ecological, scientific, historic and aesthetic features and requires a permit to enter. "Antarctic Specially Managed Area" was defined as an area in which activities may be conducted and does not require a permit to enter, however parties must continue to minimise their ecological impact and avoid conflicts between participating governments. Lastly, Antarctic "Historic Sites and Monuments" were defined as areas of significant historic relevance and can be proposed by any participating government.

The Agreed Measures also focused significantly on prohibiting harmful human interference, and since then several other treaties were adopted to manage human disturbance. This includes the 1994 Recommendation XVIII-1: Guidance for Visitors to the Antarctic as well as the 2004 Guidelines for the Operation of Aircraft Near Concentrations of Birds in Antarctica. Recommendation XVIII-1 provided the main regulations for tourists and expeditions to the Antarctic and required report submissions for their visits. The Recommendation explicitly stated prohibited activities for tourists in order to prevent harmful interference with wildlife, as well as guidelines for respecting protected areas, and scientific research facilities and equipment. The guidelines also included provisions to prevent human waste, pollution and defacement of property including engraving or painting on natural rocks. The Guidelines for the Operation of Aircraft Near Concentrations of Birds in Antarctica followed the legislation provided by the Agreed Measures in terms of prohibiting aircraft near natural wildlife to prevent disruption. The Guidelines were adopted by the Antarctic Treaty Consultative Parties in 2004, and listed specific regulations to protect wildlife by discouraging aircraft from flying below 610 metres (2,000 ft) above ground level, landing within 930 metres (3,050 ft) of bird colonies, hovering or making repeated passes over wildlife and flying less than 460 metres (1,510 ft) from the coastline.

== See also ==
- Antarctic and Southern Ocean Coalition (ASOC)
- Antarctic Specially Protected Area (ASPA)
- Antarctic Specially Managed Area (ASMA)
- Antarctic Treaty System
- Multilateral treaty
- National Antarctic Program
- Category: Outposts of Antarctica
- Research stations in Antarctica
- International Council for Science (ICSU)
- International Geophysical Year (IGY)
- International Polar Year (IPY)
