= German submarine U-71 =

U-71 may refer to one of the following German submarines:

- SM U-71, a Type UE I submarine launched in 1915 and that served in World War I until surrendered on 23 February 1919; broken up at Cherbourg in 1921
  - During World War I, Germany also had these submarines with similar names:
    - SM UB-71, a Type UB III submarine launched in 1917 and sunk on 21 April 1918
    - SM UC-71, a Type UC II submarine launched in 1916 and sunk on 20 February 1919 on way to surrender
- German submarine U-71, a Type VIIC submarine that served in World War II until scuttled on 2 May 1945
