= Argentine Naval Hydrographic Service =

- Servicio de Hidrografía Naval
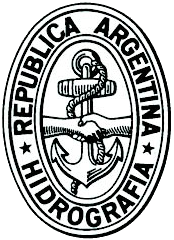

Agency overview
- Formed: 1879; 147 years ago
- Headquarters: Buenos Aires
- Parent agency: Ministry of Defense
- Website: hidro.gov.ar

The Argentine Hydrographic Service (Spanish: Servicio de Hidrografía Naval, abbreviated SHN) is the branch of the Ministry of Defense responsible for providing hydrographic services.

== Background ==
Created on January 1, 1879, as Oficina Central de Hidrografía (English: Hydrographic Central Office) by decree 11.289 of President Nicolás Avellaneda. It became the current SHN on 1972 by National Law 19.922. Since 2007, it became part of the Ministry of Defense.

The main mission of the SHN is to provide safe navigation on national waters. The service does so with the creation and maintenance of nautical charts, coastal marker buoys, and lighthouses. In concordance with the International Maritime Organization regulations, the SHN is also the global coordinator for the NAVAREA VI zone, which covers the South West Atlantic Ocean region and is responsible for issuing alerts to ships at sea and coordinating search and rescue operations.

The national official time is also a responsibility of the SHN through the National Naval Observatory.

By means of Decree 788/2007 it was transferred from the Argentine Navy field to the Ministry of Defense one.

== Fleet ==
As of 2010 the following Navy ships are assigned to it:

- ARA Puerto Deseado (Q-20)
- ARA Comodoro Rivadavia (Q-11)
- ARA Cormorán (Q-15)
- ARA Petrel (Q-16)

In February 2015 CONICET acquired the RV Sonne.
