= HMS Snipe (U20) =

Modified Black Swan-class sloop

History

United Kingdom
- Name: Snipe
- Namesake: Snipe
- Ordered: 8 December 1942
- Builder: William Denny and Brothers, Dumbarton
- Laid down: 21 September 1944
- Launched: 20 December 1945
- Commissioned: 9 September 1946
- Decommissioned: 1953
- Identification: Pennant number: U20
- Fate: Scrapped in 1960

General characteristics
- Class & type: Modified Black Swan-class sloop
- Displacement: 1,350 tons
- Length: 283 ft (86 m)
- Beam: 38.5 ft (11.7 m)
- Propulsion: Geared turbines; two shafts
- Speed: 20 knots (37 km/h) at 4,300 hp (3,200 kW)
- Complement: 192 men + 1 Cat
- Armament: 6 × QF 4 in Mk XVI anti-aircraft guns; 12 × 20 mm anti-aircraft guns

HMS Snipe was a modified Black Swan-class sloop of the Royal Navy. She was laid down by William Denny and Brothers, Dumbarton on 21 September 1944, launched on 20 December 1945 and commissioned on 9 September 1946, with the pennant number U20.

== Construction and design ==
Snipe was originally planned to be built in the Royal Navy's 1940 Supplemental shipbuilding programme, by the Clydebank shipbuilder John Brown & Company, but this order was cancelled, and Snipe and sister ship Sparrow were re-ordered from William Denny and Brothers on 8 December 1942. Snipe was laid down at Denny's Dumbarton shipyard on 21 September 1944, was launched on 20 December 1945 and completed on 9 September 1946. She was allocated the Pennant number U20, which changed to F20 in 1947, when Snipe, like all other sloops in the Royal Navy, was redesignated as a frigate. Snipe was the sixth ship of that name to serve with the Royal Navy.

The modified Black Swans were 299 ft 6 in (91.29 m) long overall and 283 ft 0 in (86.26 m) between perpendiculars, with a beam of 38 feet 6 inches (11.73 m) and a draught of 11 ft 4 in (3.45 m) at deep load. Displacement was 1,350–1,490 long tons (1,370–1,510 t) standard and 1,880–1,950 long tons (1,910–1,980 t) deep load depending on the armament and equipment fitted. Two Admiralty three-drum water-tube boilers provided steam to Parsons geared steam turbines which drove two shafts. The machinery was rated at 4,300 shp (3,200 kW), giving a speed of 19.75 kn (22.73 mph; 36.58 km/h).

The ship's main gun armament (as fitted to all the Modified Black Swans) consisted of 3 twin QF 4 inch (102 mm) Mk XVI guns, in dual purpose mounts, capable of both anti-ship and anti-aircraft use. Close-in anti-aircraft armament varied between the ships of the class, with Snipe completing with two twin and two single 40 mm Bofors guns. Anti-submarine armament consisted of a split Hedgehog anti-submarine mortar, mounted either side of the 'B' 4-inch mount, together with 110 depth charges. The Modified Black Swans had a crew of 192 officers and other ranks.

== Service ==
Snipe joined the North America and West Indies Station after commissioning in September 1946. Two apparent attempts at sabotage were noted in September 1946, with powder being found on a thermometer pocket on one of the ship's turbines. One of the ship's engineers was convicted at court martial of failing to report the sabotage, preventing it from being properly investigated, and was severely reprimanded by the court. In January–February 1948, Snipe took the Governor of the Falkland Islands, Miles Clifford, on a tour of British dependencies in the Antarctic, with the ship helping to re-establish British bases in Graham Land and the South Shetland Islands. Snipe encountered the Argentine minesweeper Seaver and tug Charrue in the South Shetlands, and while both sides accused the other of trespassing in territorial waters, relationships between the Argentine and British crews were described as cordial, with food supplies being exchanged. The ship remained attached to the North America and West Indies Station, except for returning to the United Kingdom for refits and changes of crew, until 1952, when she joined a flotilla of frigates in the Home Fleet. In February 1953, Snipe landed a party of Royal Marines on Deception Island in Antarctica to destroy an Argentinian and a Chilean military base; an action known as the Deception Island incident.

After attending the Coronation Review in June 1953, she joined the Fleet Reserve at Devonport. The ship was then transferred to Barry's Reserve Fleet Subdivision and placed on the destruction list for demolition by J Cashmore in Newport in Monmouth. It arrived in tow at the demolition site on 2 August 1960.
