= HMNZS Endeavour (1944) =

1944 Ailanthus-class net laying ship

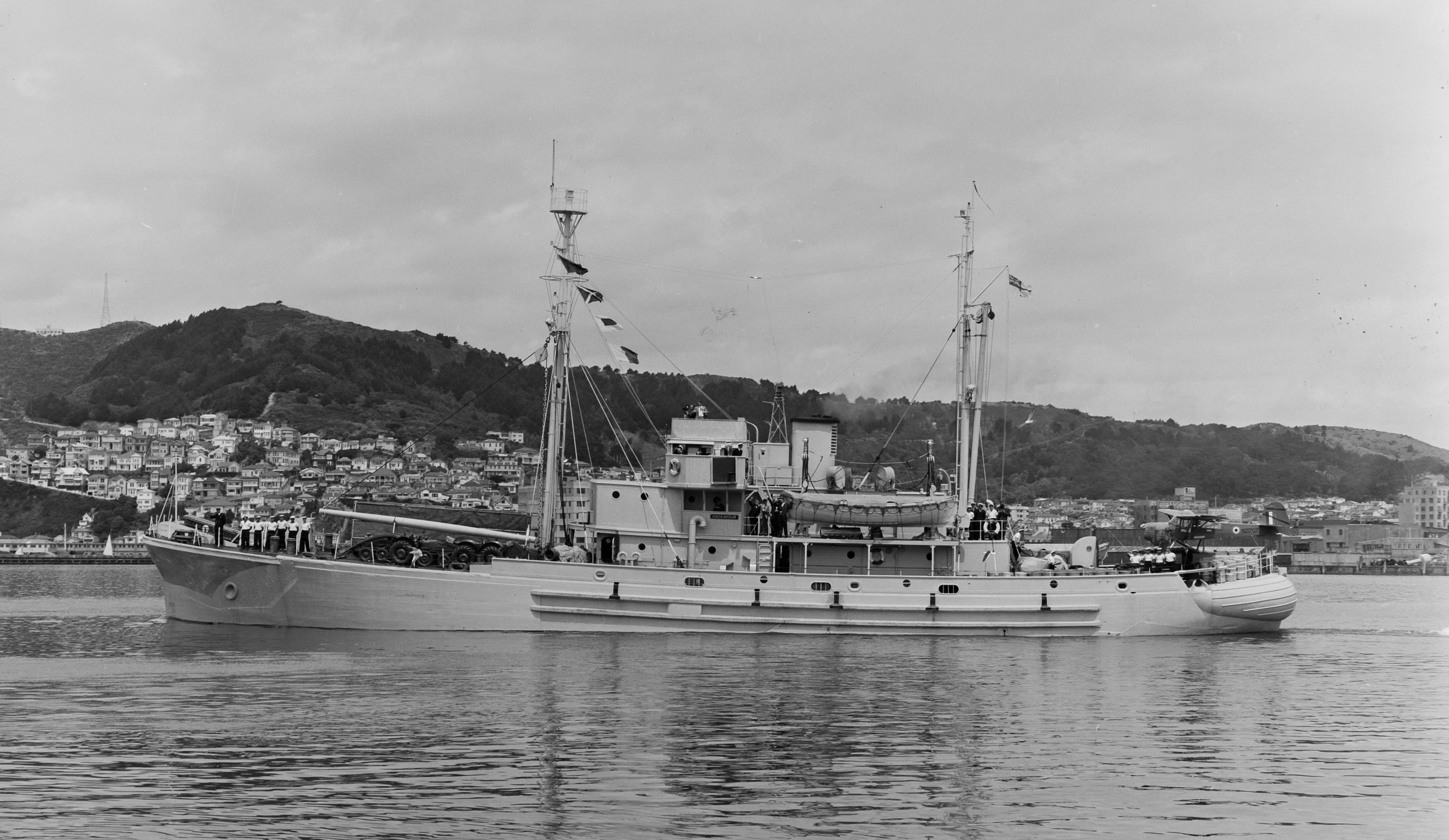
- HMNZS Endeavour in Wellington Harbour, 15 December 1956

History

United Kingdom
- Name: HMS Pretext
- Builder: American Car and Foundry Co.; Wilmington, Delaware
- Laid down: 1 May 1943
- Launched: 23 May 1944
- Completed: 5 August 1944
- Acquired: 5 August 1944
- Identification: Pennant number Z284
- Fate: returned to U.S. Navy, 22 November 1945

United States
- Acquired: 22 November 1945
- Stricken: 28 March 1946
- Fate: Transferred to the Maritime Commission, 3 April 1947, for disposal

United Kingdom
- Name: RRS John Biscoe
- Namesake: John Biscoe
- Owner: Falkland Islands Dependencies Survey
- Port of registry: Port Stanley, Falkland Islands
- Christened: 15 December 1947
- Acquired: 20 July 1947
- Renamed: Pretext in April 1956
- Identification: IMO number: 5022364
- Fate: Sold to New Zealand in August 1956

New Zealand
- Name: HMNZS Endeavour
- Namesake: HM Bark Endeavour
- Commissioned: August 1956
- Decommissioned: June 1962
- Identification: IMO number: 5022364

Canada
- Name: Arctic Endeavour
- Owner: Mayhaven Shipping Ltd.
- Identification: IMO number: 5022364
- Fate: Foundered off Newfoundland on 11 Nov 1982

General characteristics
- Class & type: Ailanthus-class net laying ship
- Displacement: 1,190 long tons (1,210 t) (full)
- Length: 194 ft 6 in (59.28 m)
- Beam: 37 ft (11 m)
- Draught: 13 ft 6 in (4.11 m)
- Propulsion: diesel electric, 2,500 hp (1,900 kW)
- Speed: 13 knots (24 km/h)
- Complement: 56
- Armament: Second World War: 1 × 3-inch/50 caliber gun; 4 × twin 20 mm gun mounts

HMNZS Endeavour was a Royal New Zealand Navy Antarctic support vessel. She was the first of three ships in the Royal New Zealand Navy to bear that name.

The ship was built in the United States in 1944 as Satinwood (YN-89) as a net tender of the Ailanthus class (but later redesignated as AN-76, a net layer) and transferred to the Royal Navy under Lend-Lease in August 1944. Commissioned as HMS Pretext (Z284), she served the United Kingdom until she was returned to United States Navy custody in November 1945. Sold by the United States Maritime Commission in 1947, she served as a research vessel for the Falkland Islands Dependencies Survey under the name SV John Biscoe. She was briefly renamed Pretext when another ship was assigned the John Biscoe name, before being sold to the Royal New Zealand Navy, renamed Endeavour, and employed in supporting the Commonwealth Trans-Antarctic Expedition and subsequent New Zealand research activities in Antarctica. Sold again in 1962, the ship, renamed Arctic Endeavour for sealing work in the northern hemisphere, foundered off the coast of Canada in November 1982.

== Service history ==
=== Second World War ===
The ship was laid down as Satinwood (YN-89), a net tender of the Ailanthus class, on 1 May 1943 at the American Car and Foundry Co. in Wilmington, Delaware. On 17 January 1944, while still under construction, the ship was reclassified as a net laying ship and redesignated AN-76. Satinwood was launched on 23 May and completed on 5 August.

After delivery to the U.S. Navy on 5 August, she was transferred to the United Kingdom under Lend-Lease the same day and commissioned into the Royal Navy as HMS Pretext (Z284). Upon completion of wartime duty with the United Kingdom, she was returned to the U.S. Navy on 22 November 1945 at Norfolk, Virginia. Struck from the Naval Vessel Register on 28 March 1946, she was transferred to the United States Maritime Commission and sold on 20 July 1947 to the Falkland Islands Dependencies Survey for $75,000.

=== Postwar career ===
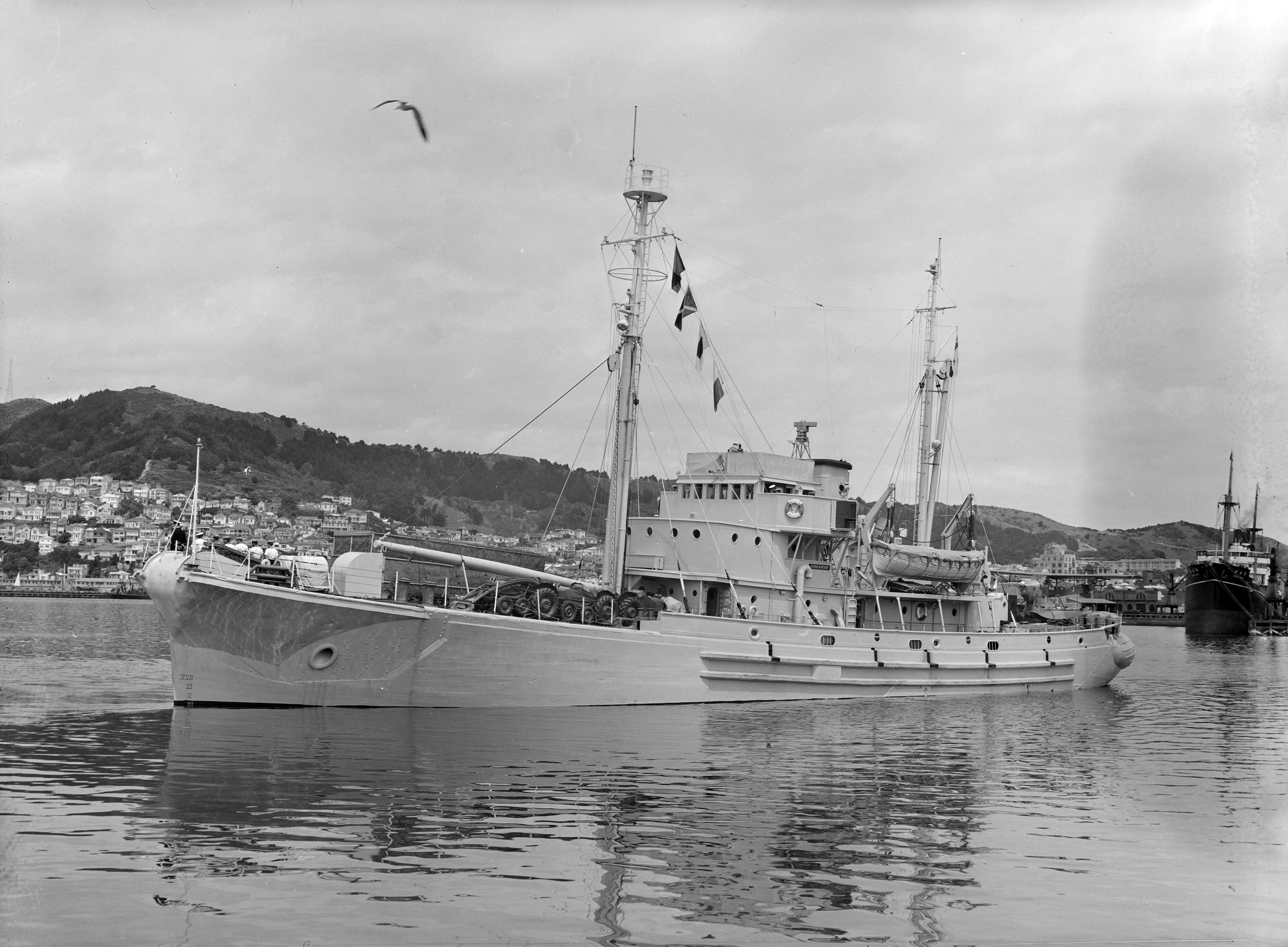
HMNZS Endeavour in Wellington Harbour, 1956

After being purchased by the Falkland Islands Dependencies Survey (FIDS), she was renamed John Biscoe. After her first season of resupplying the FIDS bases in Stonington Island and Hope Bay, her hull was sheathed in 3 inches (7.6 cm) of greenheart timber to better cope with the ice conditions. In the subsequent years she made a number of summer voyages to the Antarctic to relieve the FIDS stations. However, a ship with a longer range and greater cargo- and passenger-carrying capacity was required, and the ship's name was returned to Pretext in 1956 to free the name John Biscoe for a new vessel.

Captain Harry Kirkwood had commanded her as the John Biscoe and, when asked to recommend a ship for the Commonwealth Trans-Antarctic Expedition to take the New Zealand party to the Ross Dependency, he recommended this ship to the Ross Sea Committee. She was sold to the Royal New Zealand Navy in August 1956 for £20,000 and commissioned as HMNZS Endeavour. She was named after Captain Cook's Bark Endeavour and was the first of three ships in the Royal New Zealand Navy to carry that name, although if earlier continuity with the Royal Navy is considered, she was the tenth. It appears that no pendant number was assigned to her. She made five voyages to the Antarctic under the New Zealand flag.

In June 1962 she was sold again, renamed the Arctic Endeavour and fitted out for sealing work in the Arctic. In March 1976 she was involved in a standoff with Greenpeace activists Bob Hunter and Paul Watson off Newfoundland. She foundered off Catalina, Newfoundland on 11 November 1982.

== See also ==
- Logistic ships of the Royal New Zealand Navy
