= Chilean Antarctic Territory =

Part of West Antarctica claimed by Chile

Chilean Antarctic Territory Territorio Chileno Antártico
- Coat of arms
- Motto(s): Más allá del fin del mundo (Beyond the end of the world)
- Location in Antarctica
- Country: Chile
- Region: Magallanes
- Province: Antártica Chilena
- Commune: Antártica
- Claimed: 6 November 1940
- Capital: Puerto Covadonga
- Largest settlement: Villa Las Estrellas

Government
  - Governor: Jorge Flies
  - Regional delegate: José Ruiz Pivcevic
  - Mayor: Patricio Fernández
  - INACH Director: Gino Casassa

Area
  - Total: 1,250,257.6 km^{2} (482,727.2 sq mi)

Population (2011 Census)
  - Total: 115−120
  - Density: 9×10^{−06}/km^{2} (2.3×10^{−5}/sq mi)

Sex
  - Men: 100
  - Women: 15
- Time zone: UTC-3
- Area code: 56 + 61
- Currency: Chilean Peso
- Website: http://www.inach.cl/ (in Spanish)

The Chilean Antarctic Territory, or Chilean Antarctica (Spanish: Territorio Chileno Antártico, Antártica Chilena), is a part of West Antarctica and nearby islands claimed by Chile. It comprises the region south of 60°S latitude and between longitudes 53°W and 90°W, partially overlapping the Antarctic claims of Argentine Republic (Argentine Antarctica) and the United Kingdom (British Antarctic Territory). It constitutes the Antártica commune of Chile.

The territory covers the South Shetland Islands, the Antarctic Peninsula (called O'Higgins Land—Tierra de O'Higgins—in Chile), and the adjacent islands of Alexander Island, Charcot Island and Ellsworth Land, among others. Its boundaries are defined by Decree 1747, issued on 6 November 1940 and published on 21 June 1955 by the Ministry of Foreign Affairs:

The Chilean Antarctica or Chilean Antarctic Territory is: all lands, islands, islets, reefs, glaciers (pack-ice), and others, known and unknown, and respective territorial waters, existing within the limits of the cap constituted by the meridians 53° longitude west of Greenwich and 90° longitude west of Greenwich.

The commune of Antártica has an area of 1,250,257.6 km^{2} (482,727.2 sq mi). If reckoned as Chilean national territory, it comprises 62.28% of the total area of the country. It is managed by the municipality of Cabo de Hornos with a seat in Puerto Williams in the Tierra del Fuego archipelago (thus Antártica is the only commune in Chile not administered by a municipality of its own). It belongs to the province of Antártica Chilena, which itself is a part of the region of Magallanes y la Antártica Chilena. The commune was created on July 11, 1961, and was part of the Magallanes Province until 1974, when the Antártica Chilena Province was created.

Chilean sovereignty over the Chilean Antarctic Territory is exercised in conformity with the Antarctic Treaty of 1961. This treaty established that Antarctic activities are to be devoted exclusively to peaceful purposes by the signatories and acceding countries, thereby freezing territorial disputes and preventing the construction of new claims or the expansion of existing ones.

The Chilean Antarctic Territory corresponds geographically to time zones UTC-4, UTC-5, and UTC-6, but as with Magallanes it uses UTC-3 year-round. Chile currently has 13 active Antarctic bases: 4 permanent, 5 seasonal, and 4 shelters.

== History ==
=== Chilean Antarctica in colonial times ===
World Map by Abraham Ortelius (1570), where appears the Terra Australis Incognita

For many years, cartographers and European explorers speculated about the existence of the Terra Australis Incognita, a landmass potentially of vast size located south of the Strait of Magellan and Tierra del Fuego.

On 7 June 1494, the Treaty of Tordesillas was signed between Spain and Portugal. This treaty gave rights to newly discovered territories to the two countries according to a line running from pole to pole; at 46° 37'W in the Spanish classical interpretation and farther west according to the Portuguese interpretation. The areas of Antarctica claimed by Chile today fall within the region granted to Spain by this original treaty. Though backed by the papal bull Ea quae pro bono pacis in 1506, the Treaty of Tordesillas was not recognized by several other European powers, including France and other Catholic states. For England, the Netherlands, Russia and other countries, the Antarctic areas were considered res nullius, a no man's land, subject to the occupation of any nation that had the courage and ambition to send people to claim them.

After the discovery of the Strait of Magellan in 1520, cartographers were convinced of the ancient theory of Claudio Tolomeo about the existence of a continent around the South Pole. Maps and charts were published on the basis that Tierra del Fuego was the discovered part of that continent.

In 1534, the Holy Roman Emperor Charles V divided the South American territory of Spain into three governorates: New Castile or Peru (to Francisco Pizarro), New Toledo or Chile (to Diego de Almagro) and New León (to Simón de Alcazaba y Sotomayor) also known as the Magellanic Lands and subsequently extended to the Strait of Magellan.

Map of the Spanish Governorate of Terra Australis (1539–1555), the first territorial claim over the lands near the South Pole; later it was incorporated into the Governorate of Chile.

In 1539, a new governorate was formed south of New León called the Terra Australis under Pedro Sánchez de la Hoz. This consisted of the land south of the Strait of Magellan, i.e. Tierra del Fuego, and onward unexplored land to the South Pole. At the time, the existence of the Drake Passage was not known and Tierra del Fuego thought to be part of the Antarctic mainland.

In 1554, the conquistador Pedro de Valdivia, who led the Governorate of Chile, talked to the Council of the Indies about giving the rights of New León and Terra Australis to Jeronimo de Alderete. After the death of Valdivia in the following year, Alderete became the governor of Chile and thereby claimed New León and Terra Australis for Chile. A Royal Decree of 1554 states:

Because it was personally consulted, we will grant to the Captain Jeronimo de Alderete the land across the Magellan Strait.

Later, in 1558, the Royal Decree of Brussels prompted the Chilean colonial government to "take ownership in our name from the lands and provinces that fall in the demarcation of the Spanish crown", referring to the land "across the Strait", i.e. Terra Australis.

One of the most important works of Spanish literature, the epic poem La Araucana by Alonso de Ercilla, is considered by Chileans to give encouragement to their territorial claims in Antarctica. In the seventh stanza of his Canto I:

Northern Chile is of great length; it is called the coast of the new Sea of the South. From east to west it is narrow, 100 miles at its broadest, and at 27 degrees from the South Pole, the Atlantic and Pacific Oceans mix their waters in a narrow channel. And those two seas which clamour to join, passing along it, beat the rocks and spread out their waves, preventing numerous islands from joining together. At this point the land is split; here the waters can communicate. Magellan, Sir, was the first to open this path, which was then given his name.

A circle located '27 degrees from the South Pole' corresponds to a latitude of 63 degrees south, on the southern side of the Drake Passage and just north of the Antarctic Peninsula. However, ambiguity suggests that a misplaced Strait of Magellan may be referred to.

There are other stories and maps, both Chilean and European, indicating that Terra Australis and Antarctica were claimed by the Captaincy General of Chile for the Spanish Empire.

In March 1603, the Spanish navigator Gabriel de Castilla sailed from Valparaíso entrusted with three ships belonging to the viceroy of Peru, Luis de Velasco y Castilla. The goal of this expedition was to repress the incursions of Dutch privateers in the Southern Seas as far as 64 degrees south latitude. No documents confirming the latitude reached or land sighted have been found in the Spanish archives. However, a story told by the Dutch sailor Laurenz Claesz (date unknown, but probably after 1607), gives interesting details. Claesz said:

[They] sailed under the Admiral don Gabriel of Castile with three ships along the coasts of Chile towards Valparaíso, and from there to the strait. In March of 1603, he reached 64 degrees and they had a lot of snow there. In the following April, they returned back to the coast of Chile.

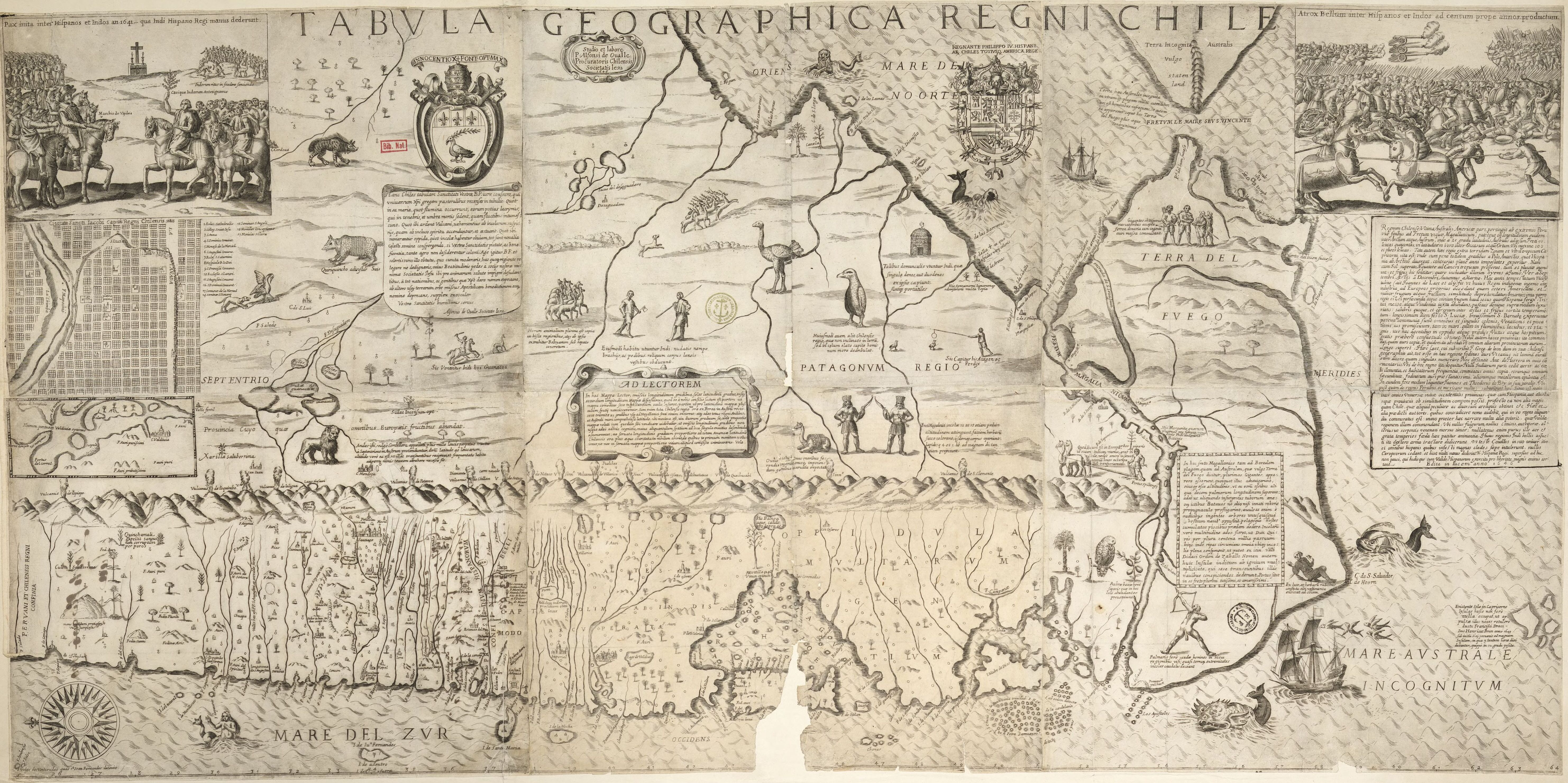
Tabula geographica Regni Chile from 1646 depicts Terra Australis Incognita to the east of Tierra del Fuego.

In 1622, a Dutch document was published in Amsterdam stating that at 64 degrees south there was land which was "very high and mountainous, snow cover, like the country of Norway, all white, land. It seemed to extend to the Solomon Islands". This could be the first recorded sighting by a European of the Antarctic Peninsula. Other historians attribute the first sighting of Antarctic land to the Dutch mariner Dirk Gerritsz. According to his account, his ship was diverted from its course by a storm after passing through the Strait of Magellan as part of a Dutch expedition to the East Indies in 1599. Gerritsz may have sighted the South Shetland Islands, though there are doubts about his trustworthiness. Other authorities place the first sighting of mainland Antarctica as late as 27 January 1820 by an expedition of the Imperial Russian Navy led by Fabian Gottlieb von Bellingshausen.

Open ocean south of South America was reported by the Spanish navigator Francisco de Hoces in 1525 and by Sir Francis Drake in 1578. The existence of Drake Passage was confirmed when the Dutch navigator Willem Schouten became the first to sail around Cape Horn en route to the East Indies in 1616. In 1772, the British explorer Captain James Cook circumnavigated the Southern Ocean.

=== 19th century ===
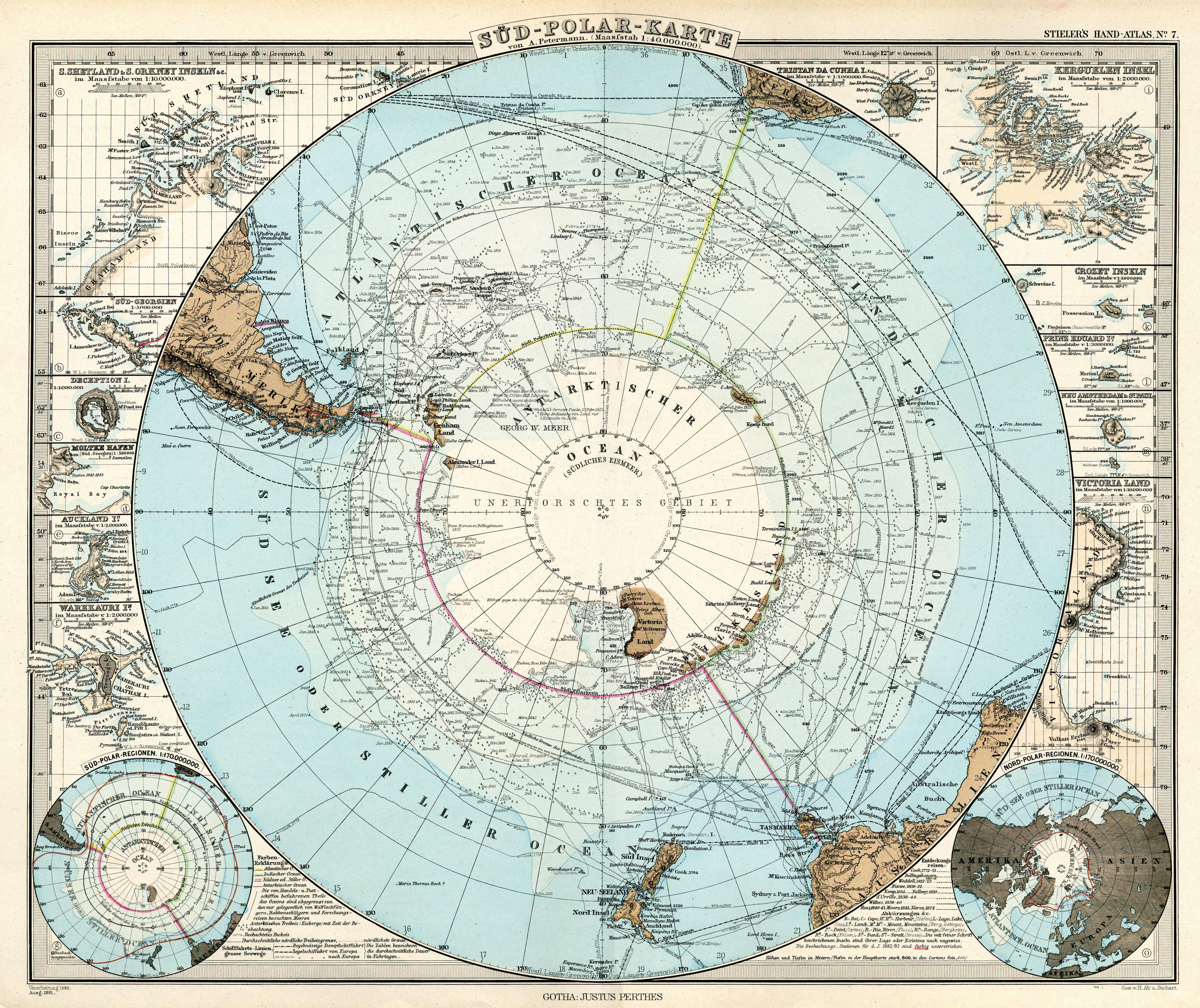
German map of the Antarctica made in 1891 by Adolf Stielers Handatlas, published by Gotha: Justus Perthes

After the colonies in the Americas had gained their independence, the new Spanish republics agreed amongst themselves to recognize the principle of uti possidetis, meaning new states would have the same borders as their predecessor Spanish colonies. Thus the Republic of Chile included all lands formerly belonging to the Captaincy General of Chile, including claims over portions of Antarctica, according to Chilean historians.

In 1815, the Argentine-Irish Admiral William Brown launched a campaign to harass the Spanish fleet in the Pacific Ocean and, when passing Cape Horn with the Argentine vessels Hércules and Trinidad, his ships were driven down into the Antarctic Sea beyond 65° south latitude. Brown's report indicated the presence of nearby land, though he did not see any portion of the continent and no landings were made.

On August 25, 1818, the government of Argentina, then called the United Provinces of the Rio de la Plata, granted the first concessions for hunting earless seals and penguins in Antarctica to Juan Pedro de Aguirre, who operated the ship Espíritu Santo based on Deception Island. Espíritu Santo was joined by the American brig Hercilia. The fact that the Argentine sealers were able to sail directly to the island can be regarded as evidence that its location was already known.

Between 1819 and 1821, the Russian ships Vostok and Mirny, under the command of the German Fabian Gottlieb von Bellingshausen in Russian service, explored Antarctic waters, as already noted. In 1821, at 69°W 53'S, he sighted an island which he called Alexander I Land, after the Russian Tsar. Although von Bellingshausen circumnavigated the continent twice, no member of his crew ever set foot on Antarctica.

In 1819, the British mariner William Smith rediscovered the South Shetland Islands, including King George Island. The American Nathaniel Palmer spotted the Antarctic Peninsula that same year. Neither of them went ashore on the actual continental landmass. However, in 1821, Connecticut seal hunter John Davis reported setting foot on a southern land that he believed was a continent.

Map of the approximate route of the Dragon of Valparaíso expedition to Antarctica—possibly the first landing on the Antarctic mainland—led by Andrew MacFarlane under the Chilean flag.

In 1820, Supreme Director Bernardo O'Higgins authorised the Scottish merchant Andrew MacFarlane, a former lieutenant in the Chilean Navy who had taken part in the Capture of Valdivia, to command the brig Dragón de Valparaíso on a sealing expedition to the South Shetland Islands. MacFarlane, an experienced merchant captain of about forty, had arrived in Chile in mid-1819 and had been hired by the government as a naval officer. The ship, formerly the Dragon of Liverpool, had been bought by Valparaíso merchants, and it sailed from that port on 12 September 1820 using the Chilean flag. British captain Robert Fildes of the brig Cora met MacFarlane on Deception Island on 16 December 1820. According to Fildes's journal, MacFarlane told him "that he had landed there", on the land south of the island, and had found leopard seals and elephant seals. On the basis of this account, several Chilean authors argue that this was the first recorded landing on the Antarctic continent. It would have taken place on the western side of the Antarctic Peninsula between mid-October and mid-December 1820, earlier than the landing traditionally credited to the American John Davis in February 1821.

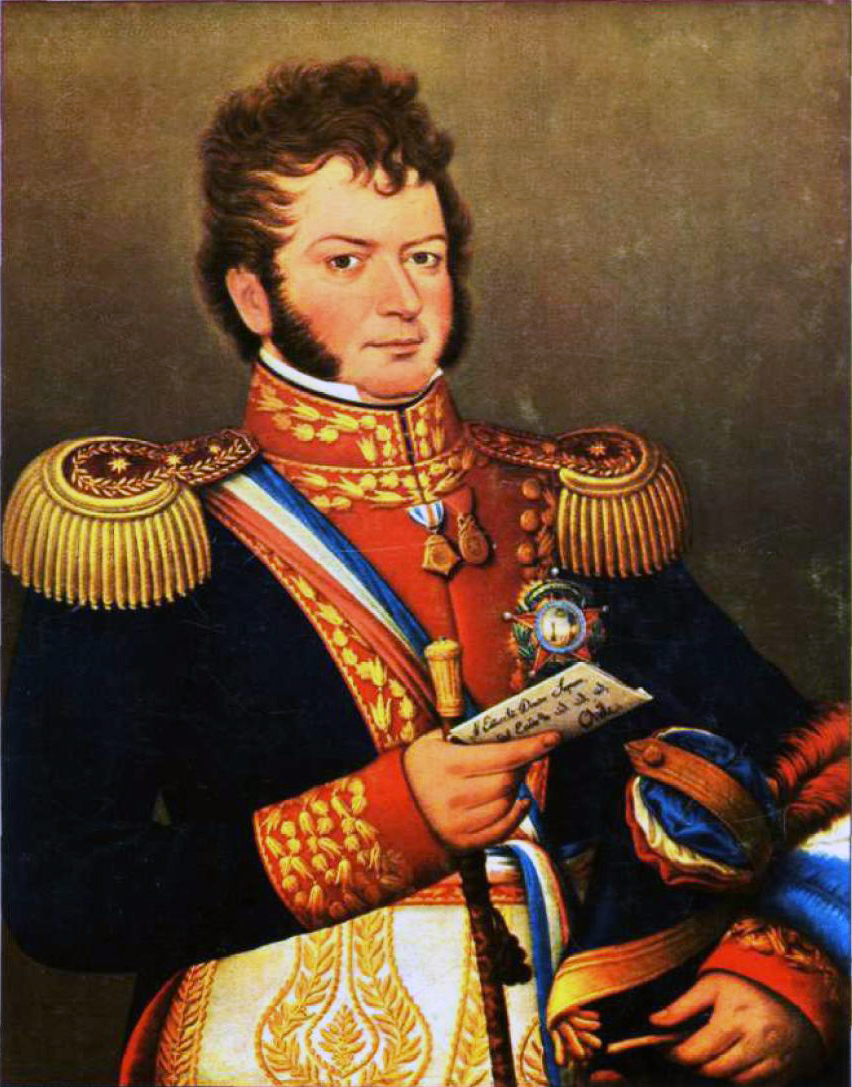
In the 1830s Bernardo O'Higgins mentions the South Shetland Islands in his notion of inherited Chilean lands from the Spanish Empire (uti possidetis juris).

In 1823, James Weddell claimed to have discovered the sea that now bears his name, lying inside the Antarctic Circle to the east of the Antarctic peninsula. The hunting of baleen whales and South American sea lions began to increase in the following years. In 1831, Chile's liberator Bernardo O'Higgins wrote to the Royal Navy, saying:

Old and new Chile extends, on the Pacific from the Mejillones Bay to New South Shetland, in latitude 65° South and on the Atlantic from San Jose Peninsula at latitude 42° to New South Shetland, that means, 23° with a glut of excellent ports on both oceans and all of them wholesome in all seasons. A simple glance at the map of South America is sufficient to prove that Chile, as is described, holds the keys of that vast portion of the South Atlantic

In 1843, a Chilean expedition founded Fuerte Bulnes, taking possession of the Strait of Magellan, just days before British and French ships arrived with the same objective. Years later Chile founded the city of Punta Arenas in 1848.

In 1856, a treaty of friendship between Chile and Argentina recognized boundaries and was enacted uti possidetis juris. The growth of Chilean settlements in the Magallanes Region and especially the city of Punta Arenas allowed the founding of companies for the hunting and exploitation of whales in the Antarctic seas, which required authorization from the Chilean government.

President Jorge Montt enacted Fishing Ordinance No. 1,623 on August 17, 1892, which sought to control illegal fishing of seals, sea lions, otters, and other species, being the first document that sought to regulate the extraction of natural resources on Antarctica. As a form of indirect control, leases and concessions were granted for the islands located south of Cape Horn. Some of the businessmen who applied for them were: Pedro Pablo Benavides, Lujes Koenigswerther, José Pasinovich, Domingo Toro Herrera, and Enrique Fabry. The Decree No. 1,642, prohibited hunting and fishing for one year. Subsequently, on August 19, 1893, and before the ban ended, the government, with the approval of the Council of State, extended by Decree No. 83, for four years, the hunting and fishing of seals, sea lions, otters, and chungungos in the area. In 1894, control over the exploitation of marine resources south of latitude 54 degrees south was given to the Punta Arenas Municipality.

In 1895 and 1896, the Chilean Navy started studies in the Antarctic continent since they received communications from captains of whaling and merchant ships from the Antarctic seas. Otto Nordenskjöld shared with the Chilean Scientific Society and its president, Federico Puga Borne, the idea of traveling to the South Shetland Islands in the summer of 1896–1897; however, these plans did not come to fruition.

=== 20th century ===
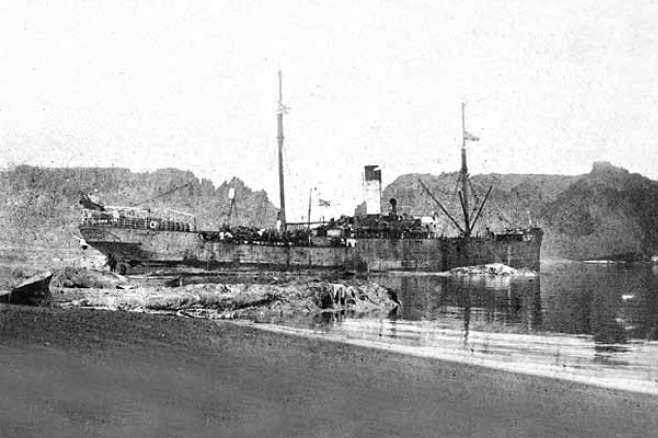
Gobernador Bories, a Chilean factory ship, anchored in Balleneros Cove, Deception Island in 1908.

In the early years of the 20th century, interest in the Antarctic territories increased. Some expeditions to Antarctica asked permission from the government of Chile, among these being those of Otto Nordenskjöld in 1902 and of Robert F. Scott in 1900. Chile also granted mining permits, such as that conferred on 31 December 1902 by Decree No. 3310 allowing Pedro Pablo Benavides to lease the Diego Ramírez Islands and San Ildefonso.

Starting from 1903, Chilean whalers visited Deception Island, led by the Norwegian captain Adolf Amandus Andresen under the Chilean flag.

By supreme decree, the Government of Chile approved in 1906 the statutes of the Magellan Whaling Company, organized by Captain Andresen and Pedro A. de Bruyne, which since the previous year had been carrying out its operations in Whalers Bay of Deception with the factory ship Gobernador Bories. Other whaling companies followed, with several hundred men residing in Deception during the Antarctic summers.

In 1906, several decrees were promulgated, including some from the National Congress of Chile, offering mining permits in the Antarctic area. In that same year, the Minister of Foreign Affairs of Chile mentioned on September 18 that the delimitation of Chilean Antarctic territory would be the subject of a preliminary investigation. Also, in the same year President Germán Riesco created the Chilean Antarctic Commission dependent from that ministry, with the aim of organizing the first Chilean Antarctic Expedition and building a weather station to strengthen sovereignty in these territories through an effective presence, however the 1906 Valparaíso earthquake made it impossible for the project to receive funding. On 10 June 1907, Argentina formally protested and asked for mutual recognition of Antarctic territories. There was work on a treaty to more concretely define territories in the region, but it was never signed.

On 8 May 1906, the Whaling Society of Magallanes was created with a base in Punta Arenas, organized by Captain Andresen and Pedro A. de Bruyne, which since the previous year had been carrying out its operations in Whalers Bay of Deception with the factory ship Gobernador Bories. Other whaling companies followed, such as the Corral Whaling Society and the Magallanes Fishing Company, with had several hundred men residing in Deception during the Antarctic summers and operated until World War I. On 1 December, the Magallanes society was authorized to expand its territory to the South Shetland Islands, as allowed by Decree No. 1314 of the governor of Magallanes. The group expanded to Whalers Bay on Deception Island, where they hoisted the Chilean flag and established a coaling station. This area was visited by Jean-Baptiste Charcot in December 1908 to replenish coal. The site was manned during the summer seasons until 1914.

In 1908, the British ship Telefon, which was carrying coal for the supply of whalers on King George Island in the South Shetland Islands, ran aground on the reefs of Admiralty Bay (now known as Telefon Rocks) and was abandoned by its crew due to severe damage. Upon learning of the incident on Deception Island, several ships set sail for the site. Captain Andresen, aboard the Chilean whaler Almirante Valenzuela, arrived first, boarded the abandoned ship in a dangerous maneuver, raised the Chilean flag and claimed it according to maritime law. He towed it to Deception Island, beaching it in a cove (now Telefon Cove) for repairs. The following spring, the factory ship Gobernador Bories repaired it successfully, allowing the Telefon to sail again under the Chilean flag. The whaling society acquired the steamship Telefon that belonged to the Lloyds company in 1910, which had been put up for auction after the accident.

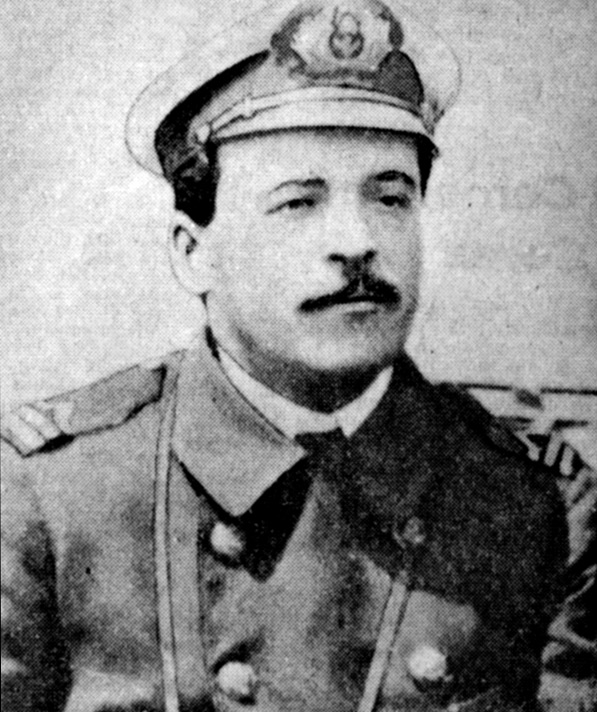
Luis Pardo Villalón, the Chilean sailor who recued Ernest Shackleton's expedition who had been stranded on Elephant Island for eight months on August 30, 1916.

On 21 July 1908, however, the United Kingdom had officially claimed sovereignty over all lands between 20°W and 80°W and south of 50°S, including the Falkland Islands and South Georgia (although not, of course, the South American mainland). In 1917, the northern boundary of the claim was moved to 58°S, and in 1962 to the parallel 60°S.

The Charter of July 21, 1908, established that: "...the group of islands known as South Georgia, South Orkney, South Shetland, Sandwich Islands, and the territory known as Graham Land, located in the South Atlantic Ocean, south of the 50th parallel south latitude, between 20 and 80 degrees west longitude, are part of Our Dominion...", which led to diplomatic conflict with the United Kingdom. The Corral Whaling Company, created in 1910 with Chilean and Norwegian capital and, from 1915, solely by Adolfo Andresen, operated on the southern coast and in Antarctic waters, in the South Shetland Islands and South Orkney Islands. It had bases of operations in Caleta San Carlos in Corral and on Deception Island.

In 1914, Anglo-Irish explorer Ernest Shackleton began an expedition to cross the South Pole from the Weddell Sea to the Ross Sea, known as the Imperial Trans-Antarctic Expedition. With the ship Endurance he sailed into the Weddell Sea, but the weather worsened dramatically and the Endurance was trapped for weeks and ultimately crushed by the ice. There followed an episode of bravery involving both Britain and Chile. Shackleton and his crew dragged three lifeboats over the frozen sea until they came to open water again, then sailed to the desolate Elephant Island at the very northern tip of the Antarctic peninsula. Shackleton and a picked crew then sailed one boat to South Georgia Island where help was obtained. However, three attempts to reach the rest of the expedition on Elephant Island were turned back by pack ice. Finally, in Punta Arenas, Shackleton obtained the help of the Chilean navy tugboat Yelcho, captained by Luis Pardo Villalón, which managed to rescue the remaining survivors. On 4 September 1916, they were received at the port of Punta Arenas as heroes. Captain Pardo's feat, sailing with temperatures close to −30 °C (−22 °F) and a stormy sea of icebergs, won him national and international recognition.

== Sovereignty and the Antarctic Treaty System ==
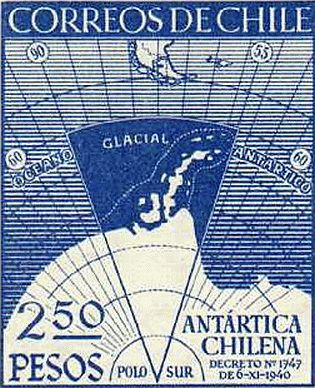
Commemorative stamp of the Chilean Antarctic declaration of 1940

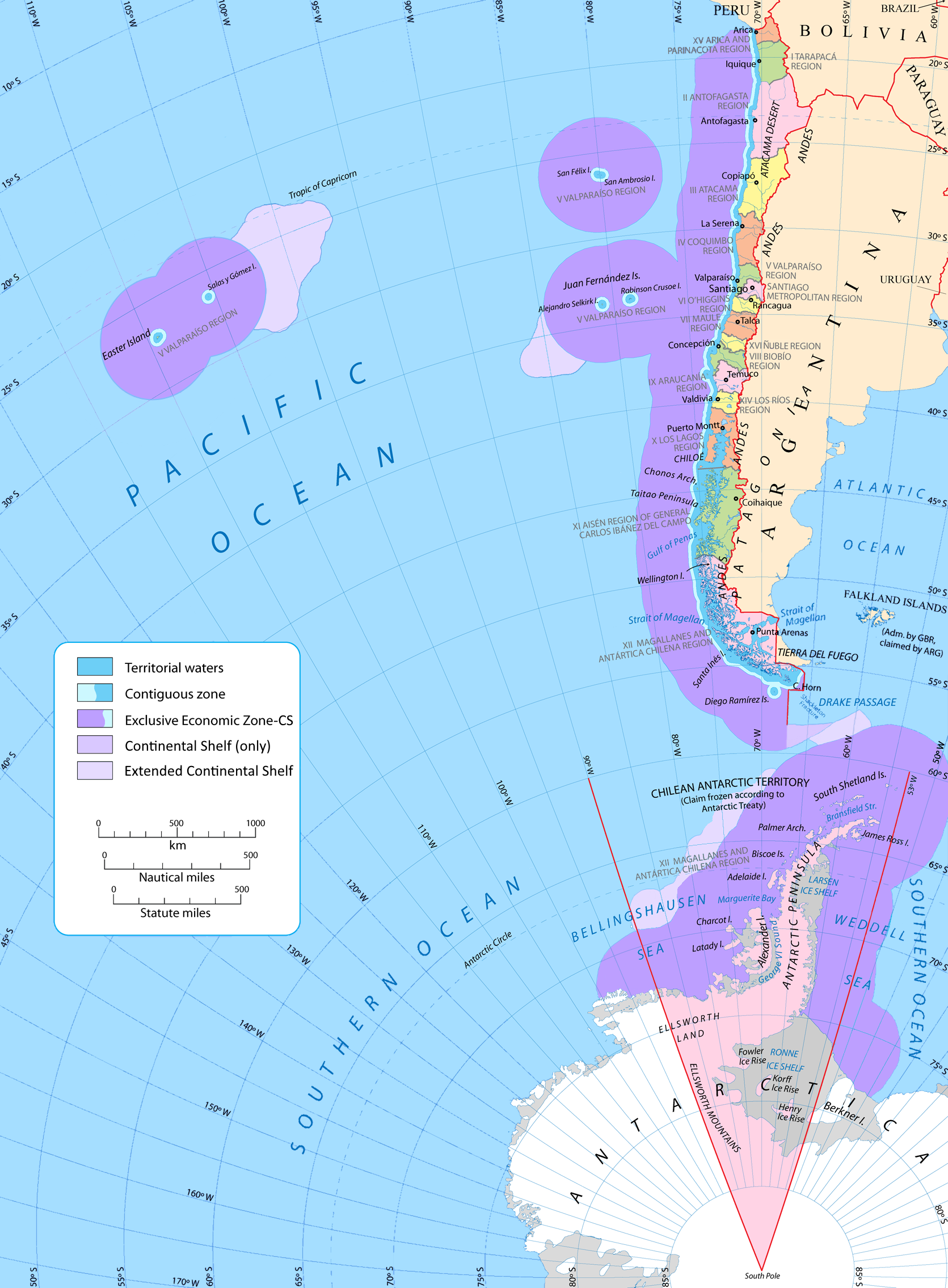
Map of Tricontinental Chile, with the Antarctic claim highlighted to its south, its continental shelf-exclusive economic zone and the extended continental shelf claim.

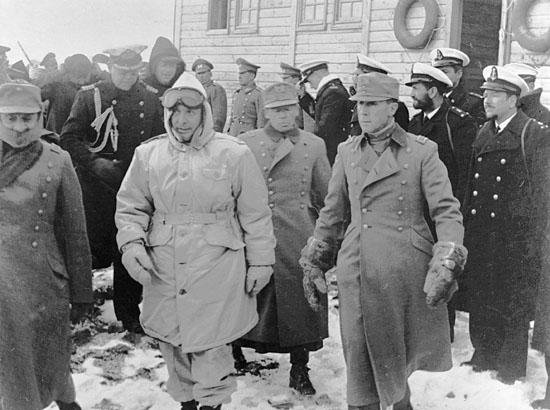
Gabriel González Videla inaugurating the Base General Bernardo O'Higgins Riquelme in Antarctica in 1948

Map of the three areas dividing the Chilean territory: In blue: Continental Chile In red: Insular Chile In green: Antarctic Chile

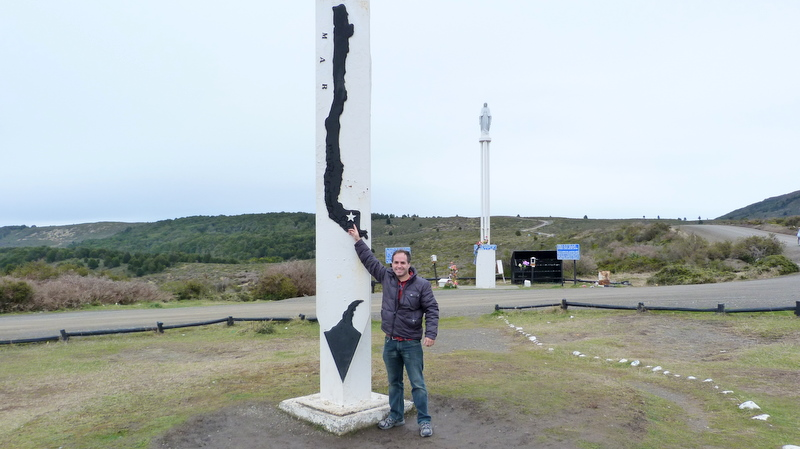
Monument near Puerto Hambre marking the center of Chile, including the Antarctic Territory

On 14 January 1939, Norway declared its territorial claims on Queen Maud Land between 0° and 20°W. This prompted President Pedro Aguirre Cerda of Chile to encourage the definition of Chilean territory in the Antarctic. Following Decree No. 1541 on 7 September, he organized a commission led ad honorem by Julio Escudero Guzmán, ad composed by Enrique Corvodez Madariaga, Antonio Huneeus Gana and Ramón Cañas Montalva, which set the bounds of Chilean territory according to the theory of polar areas, taking into account geographical, historical, legal, and diplomatic precedents. The Commander Ramón Cañas Montalva demanded on April 1, 1940, that the Chilean borders in the Antarctic should be explicitly stated as soon as possible.

The bounds were formalized by Decree No. 1747, enacted on 6 November 1940, and published on 21 June 1955. The first date is commemorated annually in the country as Chilean Antarctic Day. The Chilean claim is also based in the based on the uti possidetis juris principle inheriting the Spanish claims on Terra Australis that were transferred to the Governorate of Chile in 1555.

According to Pablo Ihl, the inherited Antarctic rights of Chile had as its eastern border the Tordesillas meridian located further east than the claimed 53° W. Thus, some authors claim that the country avoided to include the South Orkney Islands (Note: Some Chilean nationalist sources like Oscar Espinosa Moraga, claim that Chile renounced to a third of its Antarctic sector in favor of Argentina, without stating sources, stating that the Tordesillas line passed through the meridian 37° 7' W, however, classically it is considered that Spain understood aproximatelly at 46° 37 'W.) by considering the rights of Argentina over them, however most of the calculations of the Tordesillas meridian are west of the mentioned islands. Decree No. 1,723 from November 2, 1940, gave the Foreign Ministry of Chile the exclusively handle all knowledge and resolutions related to the Antarctic territorial claim. Argentina formally protested the Chilean decree on a note from November 12, 1940, rejecting Chile's claim and expressing a potential claim to a similar area. In the 20th Century these areas were claimed by Britain.

In January 1942, Argentina declared its Antarctic rights between the meridians at 25° (near the far east of the South Sandwich Islands) and 68° 34' W, south of 60° S, establishing the Argentine Antarctica, according to the theory of polar areas. (Note: Oscar Espinosa Moraga claims it was on the 68° 24' W meridian instead of 68° 34' W, being a direct projection from Punta Dúngeness, the southernmost point of mainland Argentina.) In 1946 Argentina moved the western boundary for the Argentine Antarctic Sector, widening the claim out to 74° W.

Chile began to exercise sovereignty in the Antarctic area in 1947, beginning with the establishment of Sovereignty Base, currently known as Arturo Prat, in the South Shetland Islands. The following year, as a way of establishing the Chilean claims, Chilean President Gabriel Gonzalez Videla personally opened Base General Bernardo O'Higgins Riquelme on the Antarctic Peninsula, whose construction was carried out by Eduardo Saavedra Rojas. This was the first official visit of a head of state to Antarctica. Meanwhile, the first continental Argentine base in Antarctica, the Almirante Brown Naval detachment, was opened in 1951.

On March 4, 1948, Chile and Argentina signed an agreement on mutual protection and legal defense of their Antarctic territorial rights, agreeing to act in concert to defend the rights of both countries in Antarctica, while leaving the delimitation of their territories for a later date. The governments agreed that "between the meridians 25° and 90° west longitude from Greenwich, indisputable sovereign rights are recognized by Chile and Argentina", stating that "Chile and Argentina have unquestionable rights of sovereignty in the polar area called American Antarctica" (Antártida Americana in Spanish). There were minor agreements between both countries in 1952 and 1953.

In 1953, the representative of India at the United Nations presented a project for the internationalization of Antarctica. The Chilean ambassador in New Delhi, Miguel Serrano, however, persuaded the Prime Minister Jawaharlal Nehru to withdraw the proposal. On 4 May 1955, the United Kingdom filed two lawsuits against Argentina and Chile before the International Court of Justice, to declare invalid the claims of sovereignty of the two countries in the Antarctic and sub-Antarctic areas. Chilean Law No. 11486 of June 17, 1955, added the Chilean Antarctic Territory to the Province of Magallanes, which on 12 July 1974 became the Region of Magallanes and Chilean Antarctica. On 15 July 1955, the Chilean government formally rejected the jurisdiction of the International Court of Justice in this case, and on 1 August the Argentine government followed suit. The United Kingdom submitted its written argument on 16 March 1956.

On 28 February 1957, Argentine Decree Law No. 2129 established the limits of their claim as the meridians 25° and 74° W and the parallel 60° S. This continuied to overlap the territory claimed by Chile. In 1958, the U.S. president, Dwight Eisenhower, invited Chile to the International Geophysical Year Conference in an attempt to resolve the claiming issues. On 1 December 1959, Chile signed the Antarctic Treaty, which entered into force on June 23, 1961.

The Antártica commune was created by Decree 3773 of July 11, 1961, and was dependent on the Department of Magallanes (Punta Arenas) until 1975, when the Antártica Chilena Province was established, after which it became administratively dependent on Puerto Williams. It originally comprised two districts: Piloto Pardo and Tierra de O'Higgins.

On April 9, 1984, Augusto Pinochet inaugurated Villa Las Estrellas in King George Island. During his speech he said:

You, compatriots, with the strength of spirit of pioneers are sending a light into the future from the present, which honourably , which honourably represents the intention of the government and the Chilean people to develop this region

Squadron Captain Daniel Contreras was appointed as the first mayor of the Antártica commune.

In July 2003, Chile and Argentina began maintaining a joint emergency shelter called Abrazo de Maipú in the Antarctic Peninsula, halfway between Base General Bernardo O'Higgins Riquelme, operated by Chile, and Esperanza Base, maintained by Argentina. It was closed in 2010.

In 2014, President Sebastián Piñera inaugurated the Union Glacier Joint Scientific Polar Station, located 1.129 km from the South Pole, making it the third closest station after the American Amundsen–Scott Station and the Chinese Kunlun Station. For the establishment of the base, the domes from the Teniente Arturo Parodi Alister Base were relocated; this station had been maintained in Patriot Hills by the Chilean Air Force since 1999.

In February 2022, Chile submitted its second partial report regarding the Western Extended Continental Shelf of the Chilean Antarctic Territory. In August of the same year, it delivered oral presentations for both partial reports during the 55th Session of the United Nations Commission on the Limits of the Continental Shelf in New York.

In 2023, the Hydrographic and Oceanographic Service of the Chilean Navy made available an illustrative graphic showing all the maritime areas claimed by the country, including those of the continental shelf and extended continental shelf of the Chilean Antarctic Territory.

In January 2025, as part of Operación Estrella Polar III, President Gabriel Boric became the first head of state to visit the South Pole and the third head of government, being the first from Latin America. Prime Minister Helen Clark from New Zealand went in 2007 and Prime Minister Jens Stoltenberg from Norway went in 2011.

=== The Antarctic Treaty ===
The treaty states:

- Antarctica is a World Heritage Site.
- The Antarctic territory is to be reserved for peaceful purposes and cannot be used for war or for military or naval installations.
- The signatory countries of the treaty have the right to establish bases for scientific purposes (marine biology, seismology, volcanology, etc.).
- Territorial claims are to be frozen, ensuring each signatory nation the status quo for the duration of the treaty.
- In this territory, even for peaceful purposes, there can be no nuclear tests and toxic waste cannot be left.

== Geography and climate ==
The Chilean Antarctic Territory in Antarctica

=== Land elevation and features ===
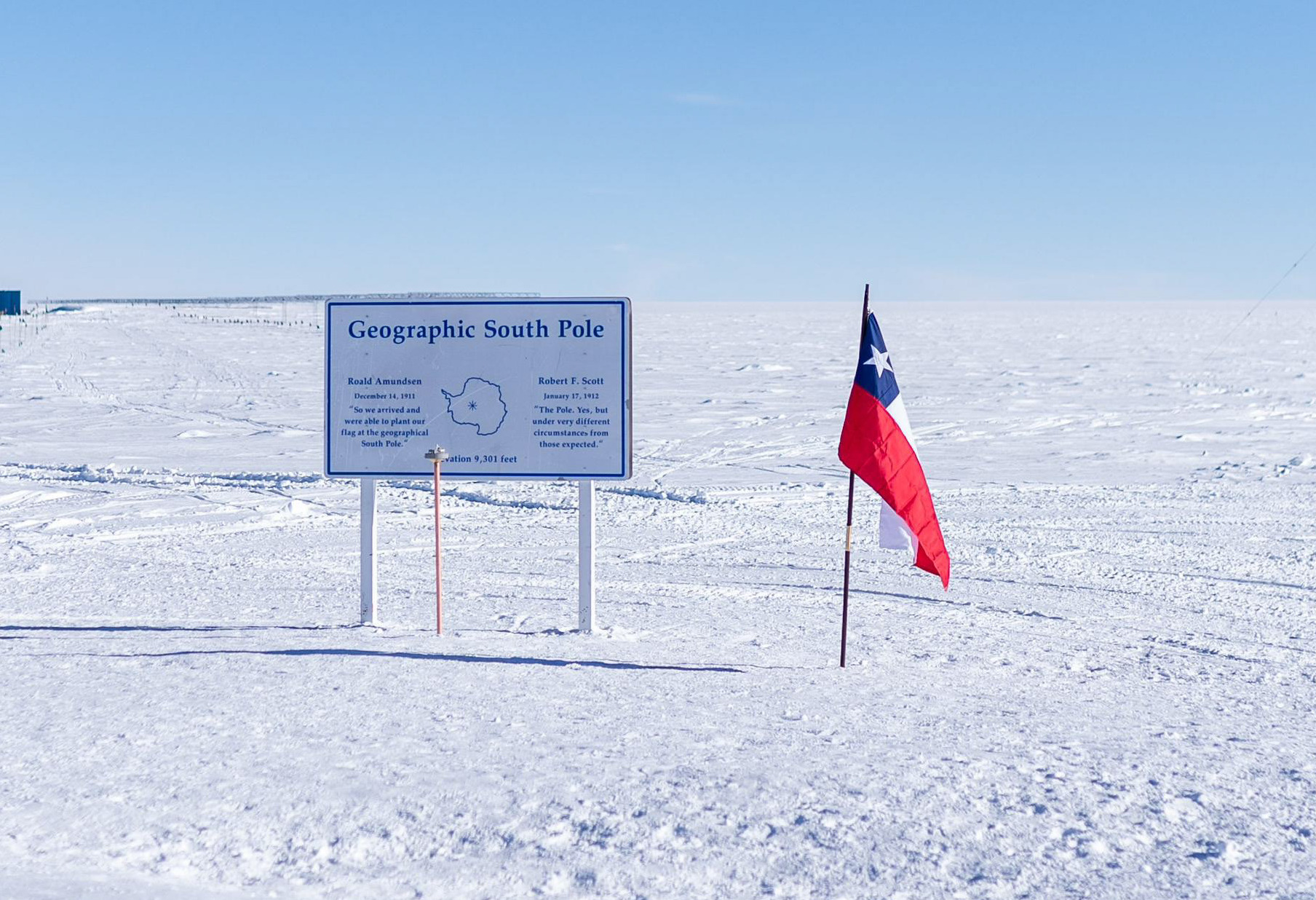
Southern Frontier of Tricontinental Chile, the South Pole with a national flag

The Chilean Antarctic Territory covers an area of 1,250,257 km^{2} (482,727 sq mi). The thickness of ice covering the land can exceed 1,200 meters (3,900 ft) in some areas in the interior of the continent, and the extent of sea ice varies dramatically with the seasons.

Chilean Antarctic Territory is located predominantly in Lesser Antarctica or West Antarctica, which includes the Antarctic Peninsula, known in Chile as O'Higgins Land. Forming the spine of this peninsula are the mountains of the Antarctandes, which are a continuation of the Andes mountains. Mount Hope is the highest mountain in the Antarctandes, reaching 3,239 meters (10,627 ft) in altitude. The Antarctandes clearly differentiate three geographic areas in O'Higgins Land: the western slope, the central plateau and the eastern slope.

To the southwest of the Antarctic Peninsula, within the land claimed by Chile, are the highest summits of the Antarctic continent, a part of the Sentinel Range including the Vinson Massif at 4,897 m (16,066 ft), Mount Tyree at 4,852 m (15,919 ft) and Mount Shinn at 4,800 m (15,700 ft) in height.

The claimed territory has a subglacial lake, the Lake CECs, which was discovered in January 2014 by scientists of Centro de Estudios Científicos headquartered in Valdivia, Chile, and was validated in May 2015 with the publication of its existence in the journal Geophysical Research Letters. The lake has an estimated area of 18 km^{2} (6.9 sq mi), lies 2.6 km (1.6 mi) deep under the ice and is located in a buffer zone of three major glaciers, in an area designated low-disturbance with ice motion almost nonexistent. There is a hypothesis that it could have life; this would have developed in conditions of extreme isolation and the lake is encapsulated.

=== Climate ===
Coastal areas north of the Antarctic Peninsula and in the South Shetland Islands, have a subarctic climate or tundra, that is, the average temperature in the warmest month exceeds 0 °C (32 °F) and much is permafrost. The rest of the territory is under the regime of a polar climate. Precipitation in the territory is relatively rare and decreases towards the South Pole, creating polar desert conditions.

== Population ==
The Antártica Commune had a population of 150 inhabitants on the Chilean bases according to a census conducted nationwide in 2012, corresponding to 54 civilians and 96 military. These people were mostly members of the Chilean Air Force and their families, who lived predominantly in Villa Las Estrellas. This town, located next to the Presidente Eduardo Frei Montalva Antarctic base on King George Island, was opened on 9 April 1984 by Augusto Pinochet and has an airport, a bank, a school and child care, a hospital, a supermarket, mobile telephony and television.

In 1984 the first Antarctic Chilean, Juan Pablo Camacho Martino, was born in Villa Las Estrellas, who was the first human being to be conceived on the continent, while the first to be born was an Argentinian conceived in South America. As of 2026, a total of three Chileans have been born in the Chilean Antarctic Territory; Gisella Cortés Rojas was born on 2 December 1984, and Ignacio Miranda Lagunas on 23 January 1985. They do not know each other and have not returned to Antarctica. As of 2024, Ignacio is the most recent Antarctic baby, although the development of tourism has increased explosively through airplanes and cruise ships that depart from Punta Arenas or Ushuaia, with most of the flights arriving at King George Island handled by Dap Group.

== Bases, stations, shelters and settlements ==
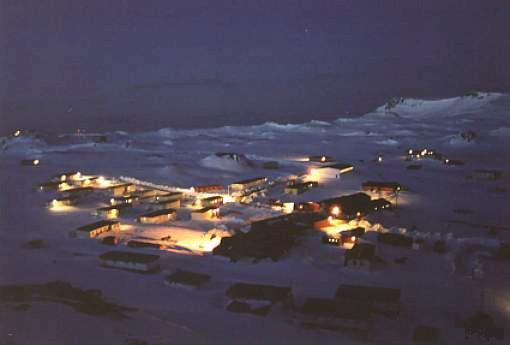
Night view of Villa Las Estrellas, the only civil settlement

Due to the geographical characteristics of the Antarctic Peninsula, which the Chilean Antarctic Territory completely encompasses, the territory has some of the best conditions for human settlement in Antarctica.

There are four Chilean permanent bases operating throughout the year, while an additional five remain open only during the summer (December – March) with four seasonal shelters.

The largest population center is located on King George Island at Base Presidente Eduardo Frei Montalva, which has an airstrip, a meteorological center (the Meteorological Center President Frei) and the Villa Las Estrellas. Belonging to Chile, this enclave forms the nucleus for important logistical support to other countries with scientific bases on King George Island.

The Chilean Antarctic Institute (INACH), under the Ministry of Foreign Affairs, operates the Profesor Julio Escudero Base on King George Island, which is the chief Chilean scientific research center in Antarctica.

The Chilean Navy provides logistic and other support for scientific and other activities within Chile's Antarctic territory. As of 2023, the navy is in the process of acquiring a new Polar 5-class icebreaker, Almirante Viel, to support its Antarctic operations, offering year-round operation in medium first-year ice (which may include old ice inclusions). Elements of the Maritime Authority operate throughout the region, promoting the security and interests of Chile, notably with the Maritime Government of Chilean Antarctica in Fildes Bay and at the Captain Arturo Prat Base on Greenwich Island, formerly a naval base, now a research station. During the 2022–23 Antarctic season, the navy transferred 730 scientists and 3,091 tons of cargo for the logistical support of the Antarctic bases. The operation involved the transport vessel Aquiles, the patrol vessel Marinero Fuentealba, as well as two supporting tugboats.

Since 14 January 1995, the navy has assisted the Mendel Polar Station belonging to the Czech Republic. Up to four Chilean researchers carry out scientific work at the base, each with sponsorship from a leading Czech researcher who collaborates in the work.

=== Chilean Antarctic Bases ===
Following is a list of Chilean Antarctic Bases:

Name	Country	Location	Type
Base Presidente Eduardo Frei Montalva	Chile	King George Island	P
Base General Bernardo O'Higgins Riquelme	Chile	Antarctic Peninsula	P
Base Capitán Arturo Prat	Chile	Greenwich Island	P
Base Professor Julio Escudero	Chile	King George Island	P
Estación Polar Científica Conjunta "Glaciar Unión"	Chile	Union Glacier	S
Base Yelcho	Chile	Doumer Island	S
Base Doctor Guillermo Mann	Chile	Livingston Island	S
Base Presidente Gabriel González Videla	Chile	Paradise Bay	S
Base Carvajal	Chile	Adelaide Island	S
Refugio Julio Ripamonti	Chile	Ardley Island	S
Refugio Luis Risopatrón	Chile	Robert Island	S
Refugio General Jorge Boonen Rivera	Chile	Duse Bay	S
Refugio Collins	Chile	Collins Bay	S

(P): Permanent; these bases are open all the year. (S): Seasonal; therse bases are open in the Austral Summer.

The largest population center is located on King George Island and consists of Base Presidente Eduardo Frei Montalva which is connected to the communal capital, the village of Villa Las Estrellas, which has a town hall, hotel, day-care center, school, scientific equipment, hospital, post office and bank. There is an airport, Teniente Rodolfo Marsh Martin Aerodrome, ICAO Code SCRM) This enclave is a center of logistical support for the other eight countries with scientific bases on King George Island.

Nearby, Professor Julio Escudero Base is controlled by the Chilean Antarctic Institute (INACH), under the Ministry of Foreign Relations, and is the main Chilean scientific facility in Antarctica.

Captain Arturo Prat Base is a Chilean Antarctic research base located on Greenwich Island. Opened 6 February 1947, it is the oldest Chilean Antarctic base. Until 1 March 2006 it was a base of the Chilean Navy, but was then handed over to the regional government of Magallanes y la Antártica Chilena Region. Until February 2004 it was a permanent base. Afterwards, it served as a summer base for ionospheric and meteorological research, but then reopened in March 2008 for year-round occupancy again.

The only permanent Chilean base on the Antarctic mainland (the Antarctic Peninsula) is Base General Bernardo O'Higgins Riquelme. This has been in operation since 18 February 1948. It is located on Puerto Covadonga and it is the official communal capital.

==== Seasonal bases ====
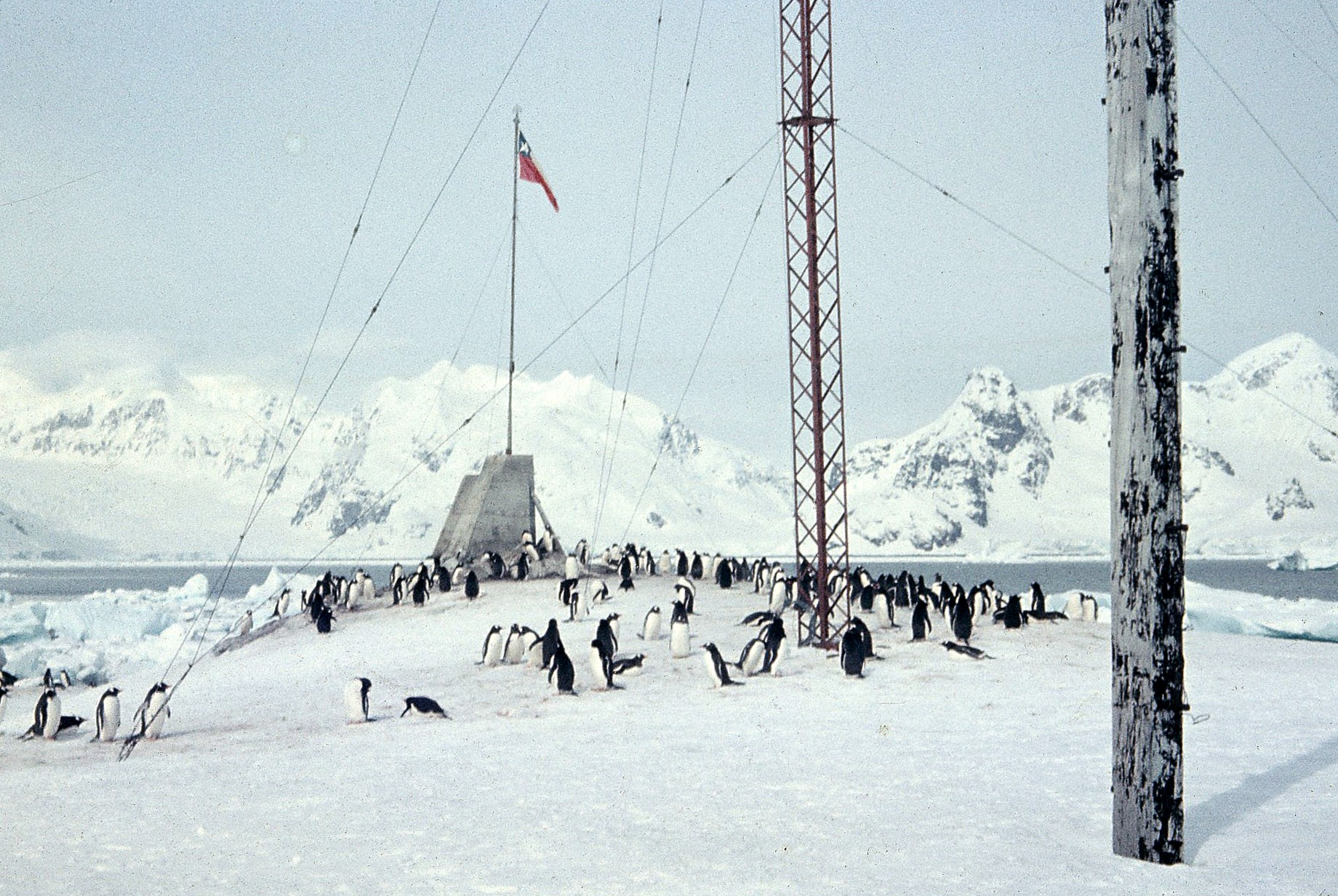
Penguins near President Gabriel González Videla Base (1957)

- Estación Polar Científica Conjunta "Glaciar Unión" 79°46′10″S 82°54′26″W; (Scientific Polar Station Joint "Union Glacier" in English) incorporates Teniente Arturo Parodi Alister Base and Antonio Huneeus Antarctic Base which moved to the new location. It is located in the Ellsworth Mountains, Union Glacier. Antarctic Logistics & Expeditions LLC is a company that has been operating an airport on the Union Glacier since 2008.
- Dr. Guillermo Mann Base 62°27′11.7″S 60°47′16.5″W is a summer base of the Chilean Antarctic Institute (INACH), under the Ministry of Foreign Relations, on Livingston Island. It is a weather and ecological research station. It is also a site for archaeological research into seal hunting. Another former Chilean refuge also called "Dr. Guillermo Mann" (or Spring-INACH), located in P. Spring (Pen. Palmer), is in ruins.
- Luis Risopatrón Base (formerly "Copper Mine Naval Refuge") 62°22′17″S 59°42′53″W is a summer station of the Chilean Navy at Robert Island, used for geodetic, geophysical and biological research.
- Julio Ripamondi Base 62°12′37″S 58°56′7″W is a little summer station of the Chilean Antarctic Institute (INACH) located on Ardley Island, next to Frei Montalva Station and Professor Julio Escudero Base (located nearby on King George Island). The Ripamondi Base has conducted research on geodesy and cartography since 1997, terrestrial biology since 1988 and studies of penguins since 1988. The base is located near a large colony of gentoo penguins.
- González Videla Antarctic Base 64°49′26″S 62°51′27″W was a station of the Chilean Air Force on the Antarctic mainland's Waterboat Point in Paradise Bay. It is now (as of 2024) an "inactive" base. Repairs have been carried out since 2003, with fuel and supplies kept in storage in the buildings for emergency use, or in case the base should be reactivated in the future. Occasional summer visits are made by Chilean scientists and tourists. The base was recently used (2011) for researches by the Chilean Antarctic Institute (INACH)
- Yelcho Base 64°52′33″S 63°35′02″W (ex Sub Base Yelcho) is located in the south bay of Doumer Island, Palmer archipelago. It was reopened in March 2015.
- Collins Base 62°10′09″S 58°51′07″W is located in the Fildes Peninsula, King George Island. It has a capacity of two persons in summer, is used for scientific research and administered by the INACH.

== Gallery ==
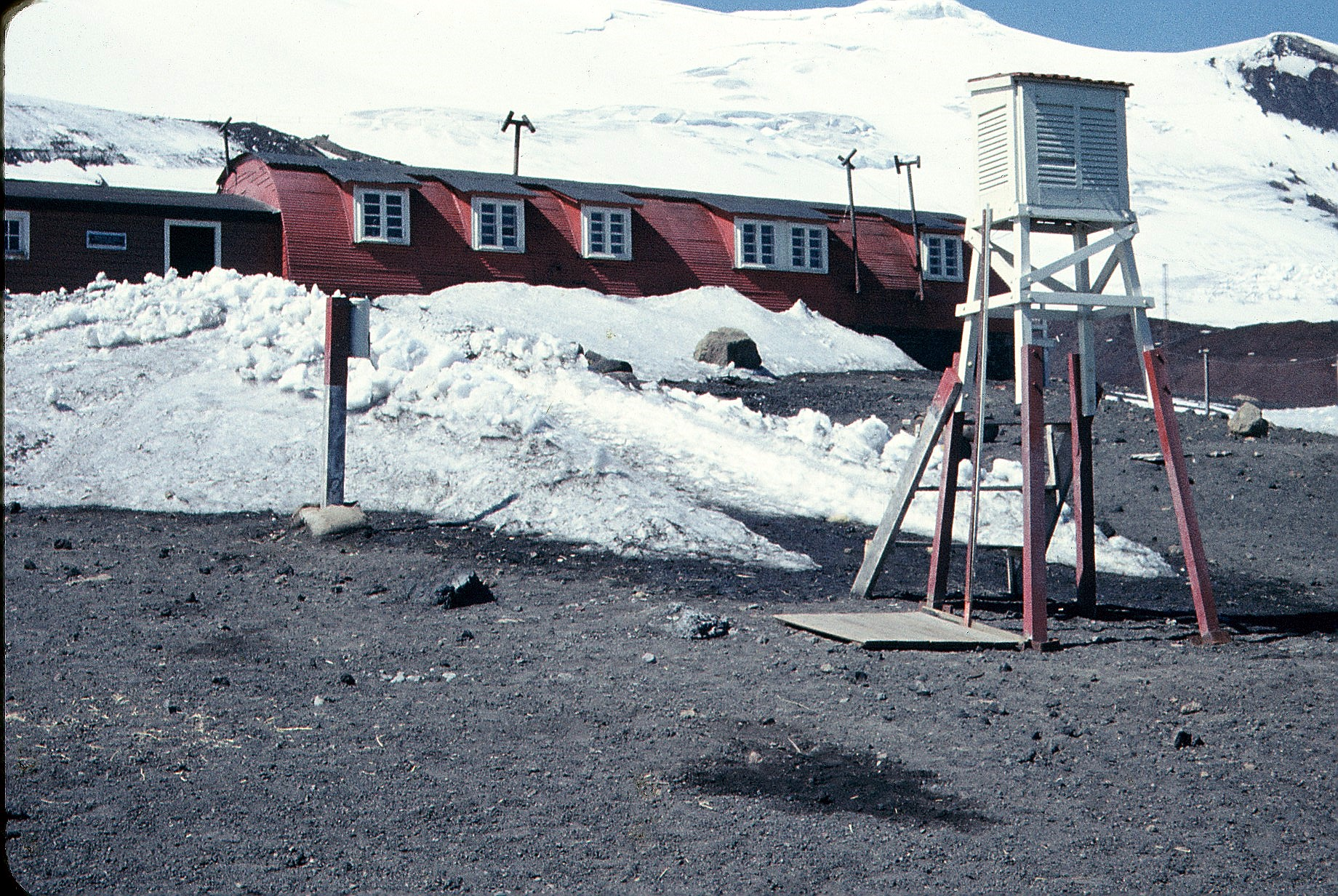
Pedro Aguirre Cerda Base (Closed Today), in Deception Island, 1958

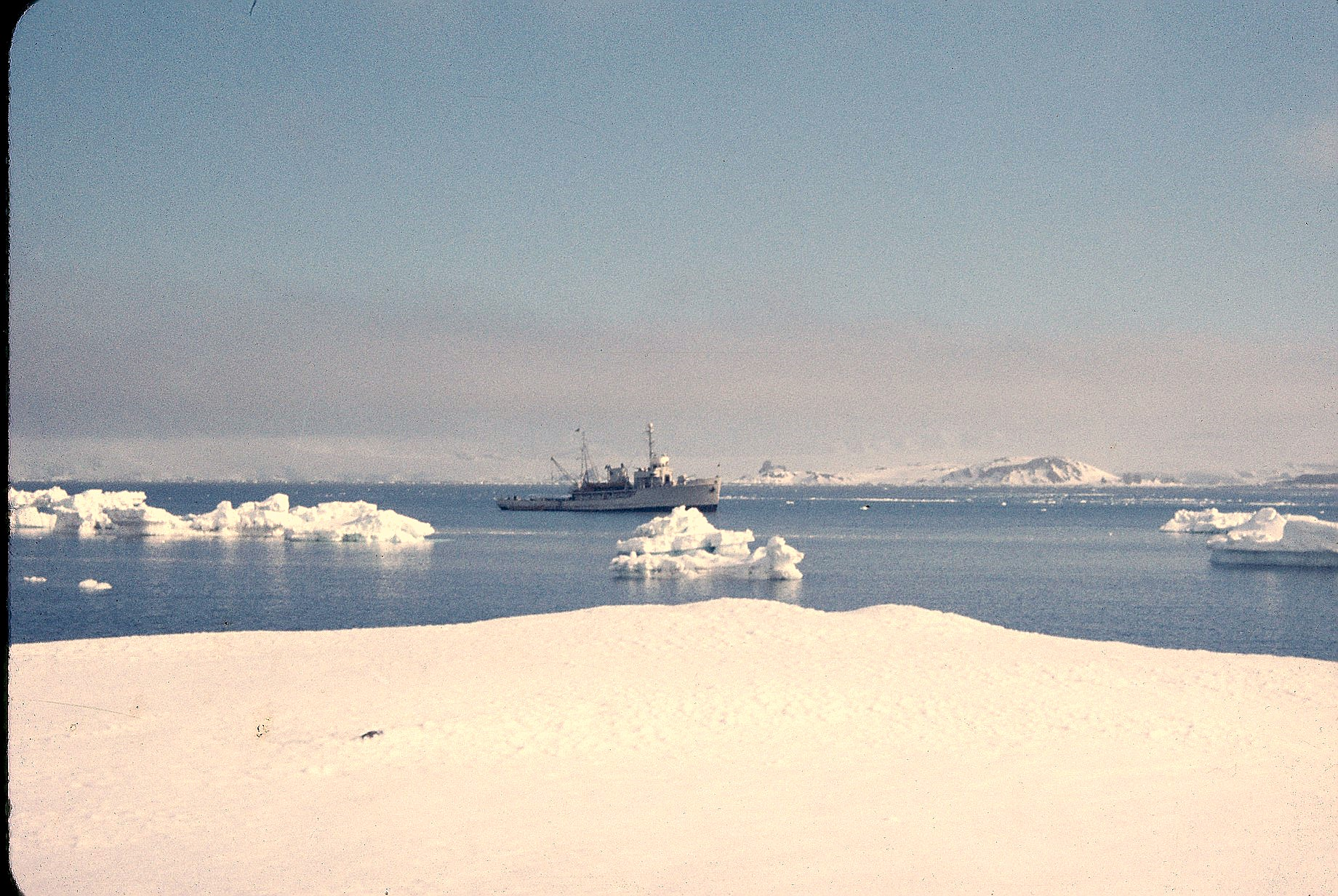
Chilean patrol Lientur in Cooper Mine, Robert Island, 1958

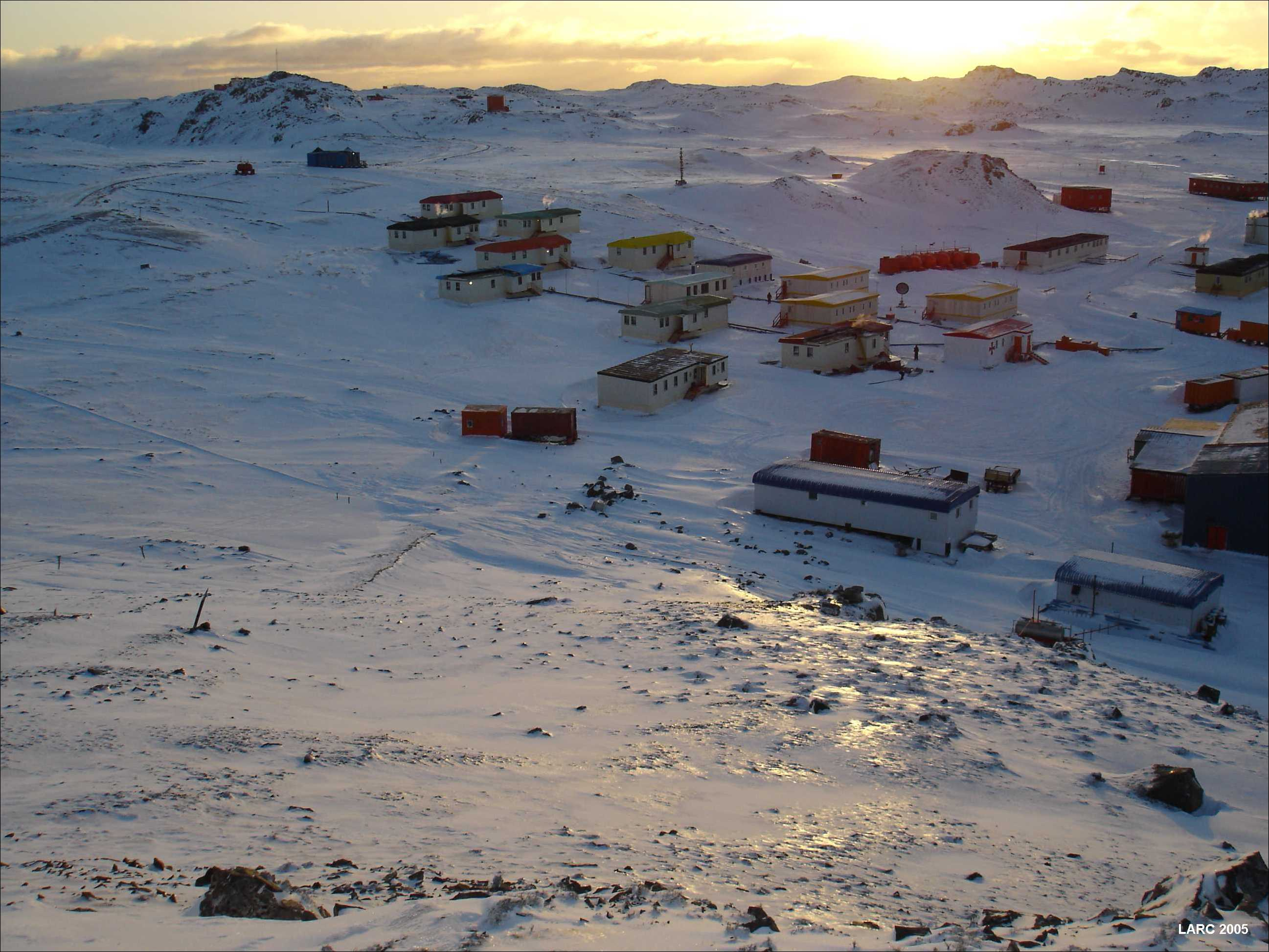
Panoramic view of Villa Las Estrellas in winter

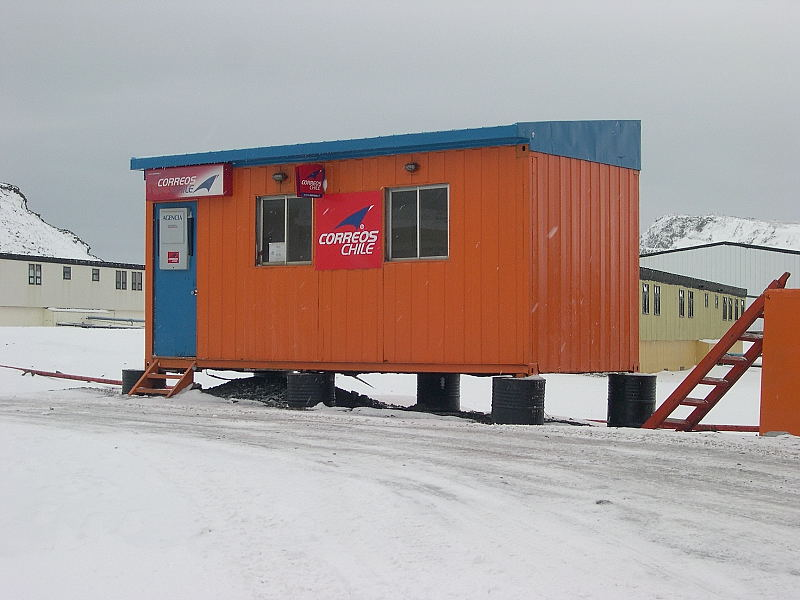
Correos de Chile office in Antarctica

== See also ==
- Antarctic Treaty System
- List of Antarctic territorial claims
- Magallanes and Antártica Chilena Region
- Australian Antarctic Territory
- Ross Dependency
- Marie Byrd Land
- Tierra del Fuego Province, Chile
- Tierra del Fuego Province, Argentina
- Beagle Channel Arbitration
- Falkland Islands
- Peter I Island
