= Gino Casassa =

Chilean glaciologist (born 1958)

Gino Casassa Rogazinski
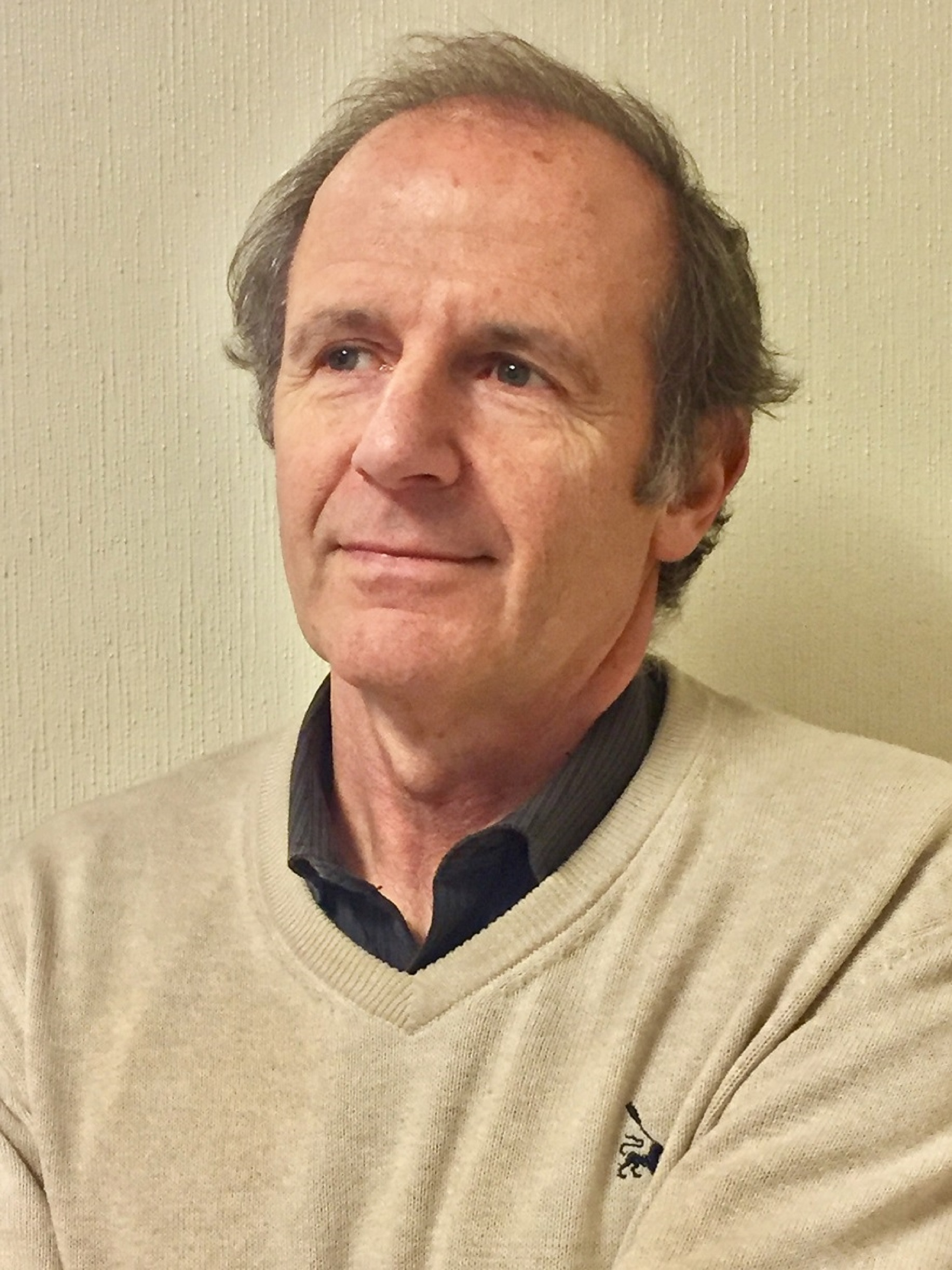

Director of the Chilean Antarctic Institute
- Incumbent
- Assumed office 17 July 2024
- Preceded by: Andrés López Lara

Personal details
- Born: April 23, 1958 (age 68) Recoleta, Chile
- Spouse: Marie Claude Bastres
- Children: 5
- Occupation: Glaciologist; Civil hydraulic engineer Professor at the University of Magallanes
- Known for: Contributions to glacier studies

Gino Casassa Rogazinski (born April 23, 1958, Recoleta) is a Chilean glaciologist, serving as director of the Chilean Antarctic Institute (INACH) since 2024. He studied civil hydraulic engineering at the University of Chile (1984), completed a master's degree in geophysics/glaciology at Hokkaido University (Japan), and obtained a doctorate in glaciological sciences at The Ohio State University (United States). He is associated with the University of Magallanes. He also maintains that the increase in the planet's temperature is largely due to human activity.

== Biography ==
His father was an Italian prisoner of war and a member of the Alpine troops, and his mother, a German woman who fled Jewish persecution to China. From a young age, he was interested in climbing mountains and met the glaciologist Cedomir Marangunic, who also studied at The Ohio State University. Along with two thousand other scientists, he shares a Nobel Peace Prize, three of whom are also Chileans who worked at the IPCC under the UN.

== Career ==
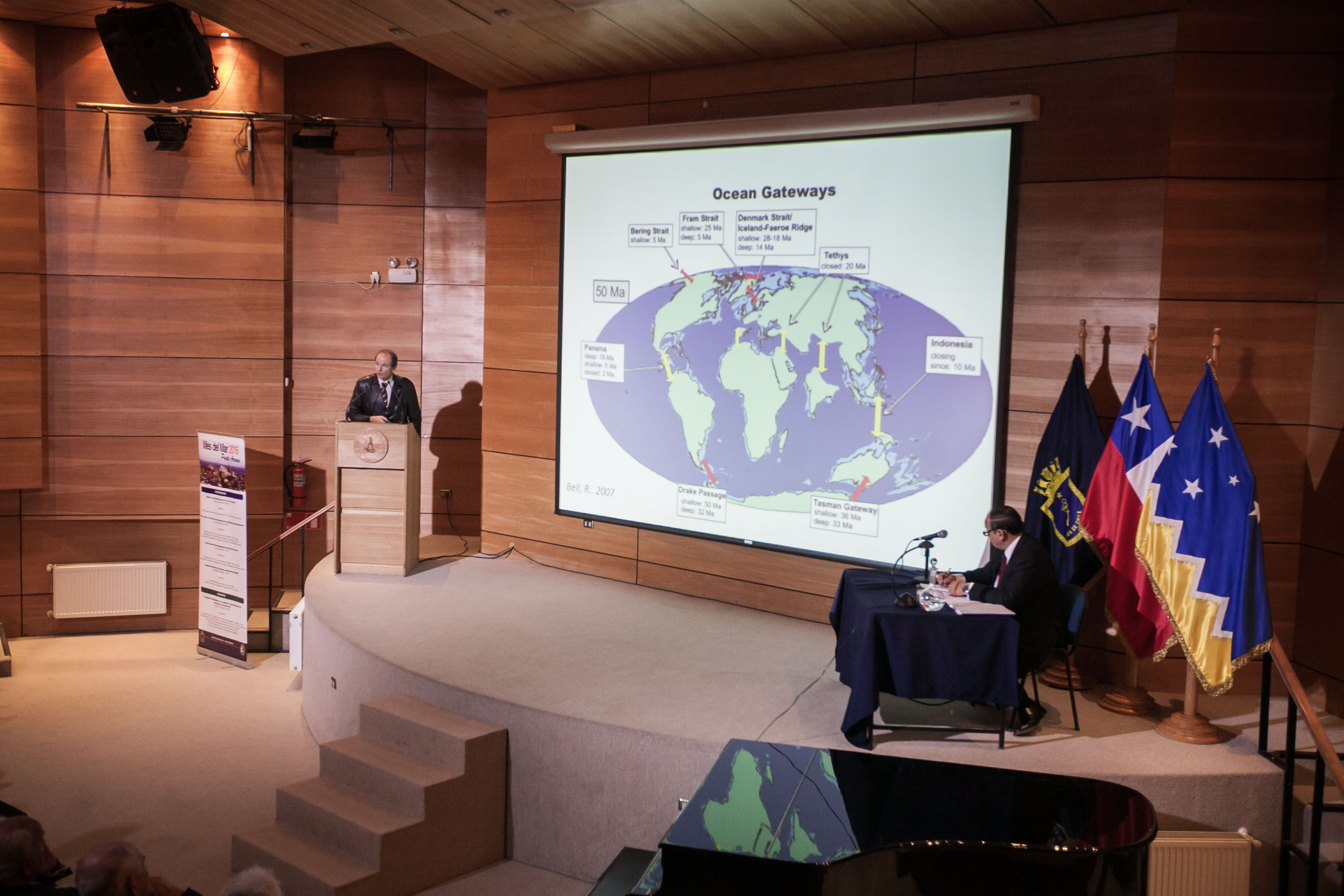
Gino Casassa in the Seminar "The region of Magallanes and Antarctica, an opportunity for development in the 21st century".

He has carried out research at the Center for Scientific Studies (CECS), where, between 2002 and 2012, he has worked in the Glaciology and Climate Change section. In addition, he served as deputy director of the Scientific Committee for the Climate and Cryosphere project (under the World Climate Research Programme), together with the Scientific Committee on Antarctic Research, and he was vice president of the International Association of Cryospheric Sciences. He received the Guggenheim Fellowship.

He was a member of the Intergovernmental Panel on Climate Change (IPCC) of the United Nations recognized with the Nobel Peace Prize in 2007 for its contribution to disseminating the theory of anthropogenic climate change. In parallel, he has led and contributed to national and international projects related to glacier research and environmental impact assessments, promoting innovation and technological development in geosciences.

Since 2023, he has worked as an independent consultant and project manager at Geoestudios Asesores Ltda. (owned by Cedomir Marangunic), while also serving as an associate professor at the University of Magallanes. From 2018 to 2022, he was head of the Glaciology and Snow Unit at the Dirección General de Aguas, and previously he promoted academic initiatives as co-founder of a glaciology laboratory and Antarctic programs at the University of Magallanes.

He has authored over 100 scientific publications regarding glacier geophysics, snow avalanche processes, and debris flows, and he has contributed to awareness campaigns about Antarctica's importance for Chilean foreign policy. After taking over as director of INACH, he expressed his commitment to strengthening the National Antarctic Science Program and Chile's participation in the Antarctic Treaty System.

== Mountain ascents ==
- February 21, 1980 at 10:00 a.m. – Mount Fitz Roy on the Chile–Argentina border. At 21 years old, while studying engineering and working as an instructor for the Chilean Federation of Andinism, along with Walter Bertsch, a 19-year-old Austrian in training as an Alpine Guide at the Austrian Alpine Club, they reached the summit via the Col Americano route. Alejandro Izquierdo, a Chilean student, reached 2,800 m. It was the first Chilean ascent of the mountain.
- 1983 – Changtse, Tibet, China – The next climb, also his first solo ascent. On May 14 via the route used by German climbers.

== Research ==
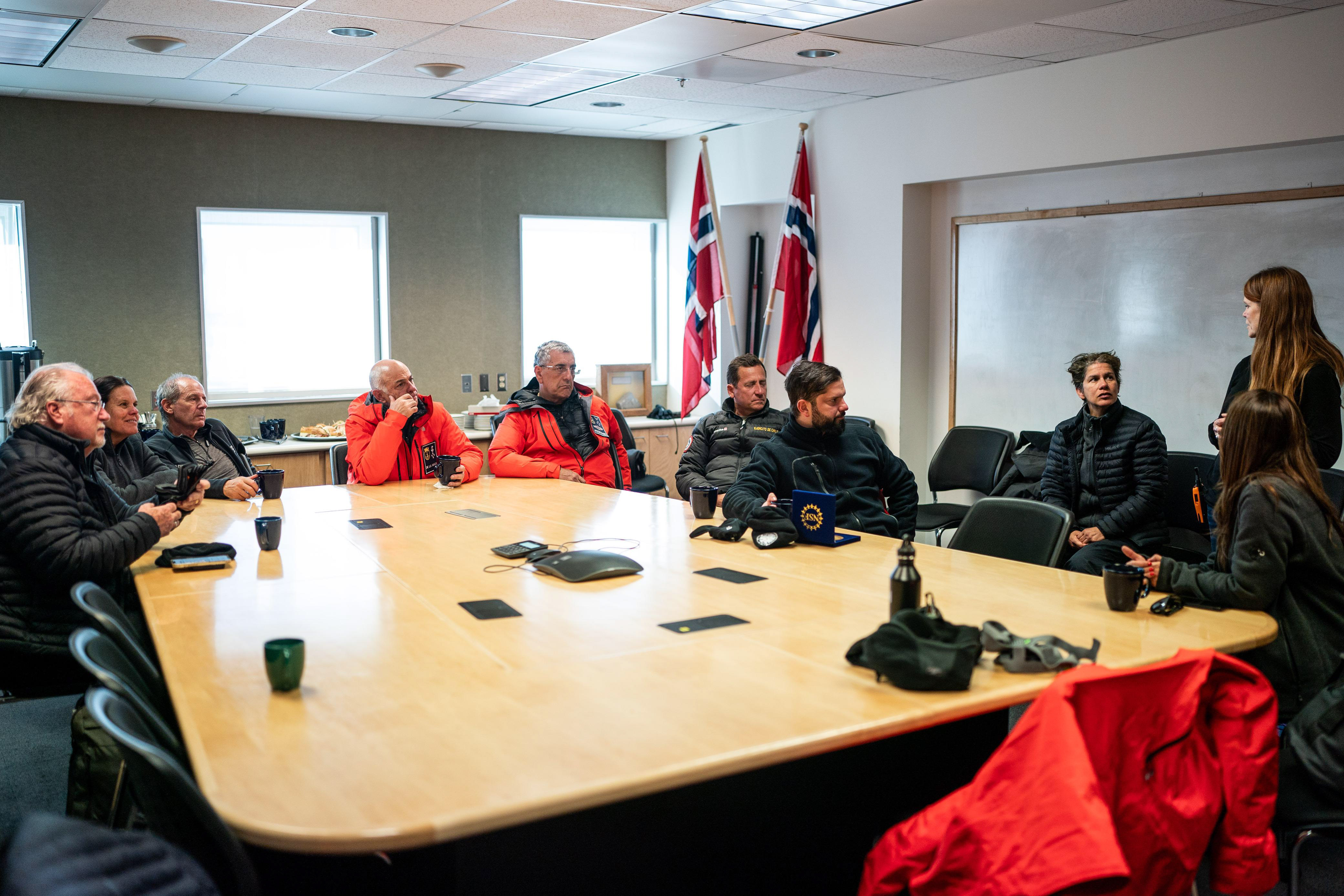
Gino Casassa with President Gabriel Boric at the Amundsen–Scott South Pole Station in the geographic South Pole.

According to Casassa, Patagonian glaciers may be in retreat, which could indicate either climatic and geological cycles explained by the Milankovitch cycles or global warming. In 2024, a study on the Patagonian ice fields in which Casassa participated determined that the glacier bed deepens up to about 20 km inland, possibly making it vulnerable to future retreat.

Additionally, regarding the Gran Campo Nevado, studies involving Casassa indicate that some of the outlet glaciers lost over 20% of their total area in that period, with glacier area loss at about 2.4% per decade from 1942 to 2002.

He has also mentioned that the main ecological disturbances may include forest fires, floods, storms, insect outbreaks, overgrazing, earthquakes, various types of volcanic eruptions, tsunamis, firestorms, meteorite impacts, climate change and the damaging effects of human activity (anthropogenic disturbances) such as habitat fragmentation, excessive logging, overfishing, high use of agrochemicals, contamination by radioactive elements or heavy metals, and the introduction of invasive species.

He participated in the Congreso Futuro of 2013 with the topic "Glaciers, the challenge to survive on a stressed planet".

During the 2004–2005 austral summer, he took part in the Chilean scientific expedition to the South Pole, as well as the Operación Estrella Polar III in the 2024–2025 summer. The Chilean Antarctic Institute collected ice samples in the area to investigate contamination levels, and Casassa was part of the expedition alongside Chilean president Gabriel Boric, who became the first head of state in history to visit the South Pole, and the third leader overall (including heads of government) worldwide.
