= Chilean South Pole Expedition =

Chilean expedition to Antarctica

The Chilean South Pole Expedition (2004–2005) was a Chilean expedition to Antarctica organized by the Chilean Navy, Centro de Estudios Científicos and INACh. The expedition travelled to Antarctica from Chile in a chartered Ilyushin Il-76 and two Hercules C-130 owned by the Chilean Air Force.
