= Teniente Arturo Parodi Alister Base =

Arturo Parodi Station Estación polar Teniente Arturo Parodi Alister
- Antarctic research station
- Teniente Arturo Parodi Alister Base
- Location in Antarctica
- Coordinates: 80°18′15″S 81°23′13″W
- Region: Ellsworth Land
- Location: Patriot Hills
- Established: 7 December 1999
- Removed: 2014
- Named after: Arturo Parodi Alister

Government
  - Type: Administration
  - Body: Instituto Antártico Chileno
- Elevation: 880 m (2,890 ft)

Population
  - Summer: Up to 25
  - Winter: 0
- Active times: Every summer
- Website: inach.cl

Teniente Arturo Parodi Alister Base was a Chilean Antarctic research base located in the claimed Chilean Antarctic Territory. It was inaugurated on December 7, 1999, and was located about 1 km from the Patriot Hills Base Camp, operated by the American private company Adventure Network International (now Antarctic Logistics & Expeditions LLC), together with a blue ice aerodrome. After the transfer to the Union glacier of the operations of the company in November 2010, the base was disarmed and transferred to the Union glacier at the end of 2013. It operated from November to December every two years by the Air Force of Chile with a population of 25 people, but could provide life support to 40 people.

== See also ==
- List of Antarctic research stations
- List of Antarctic field camps
