= Operación Estrella Polar III =

Chilean presidential visit to Antarctica

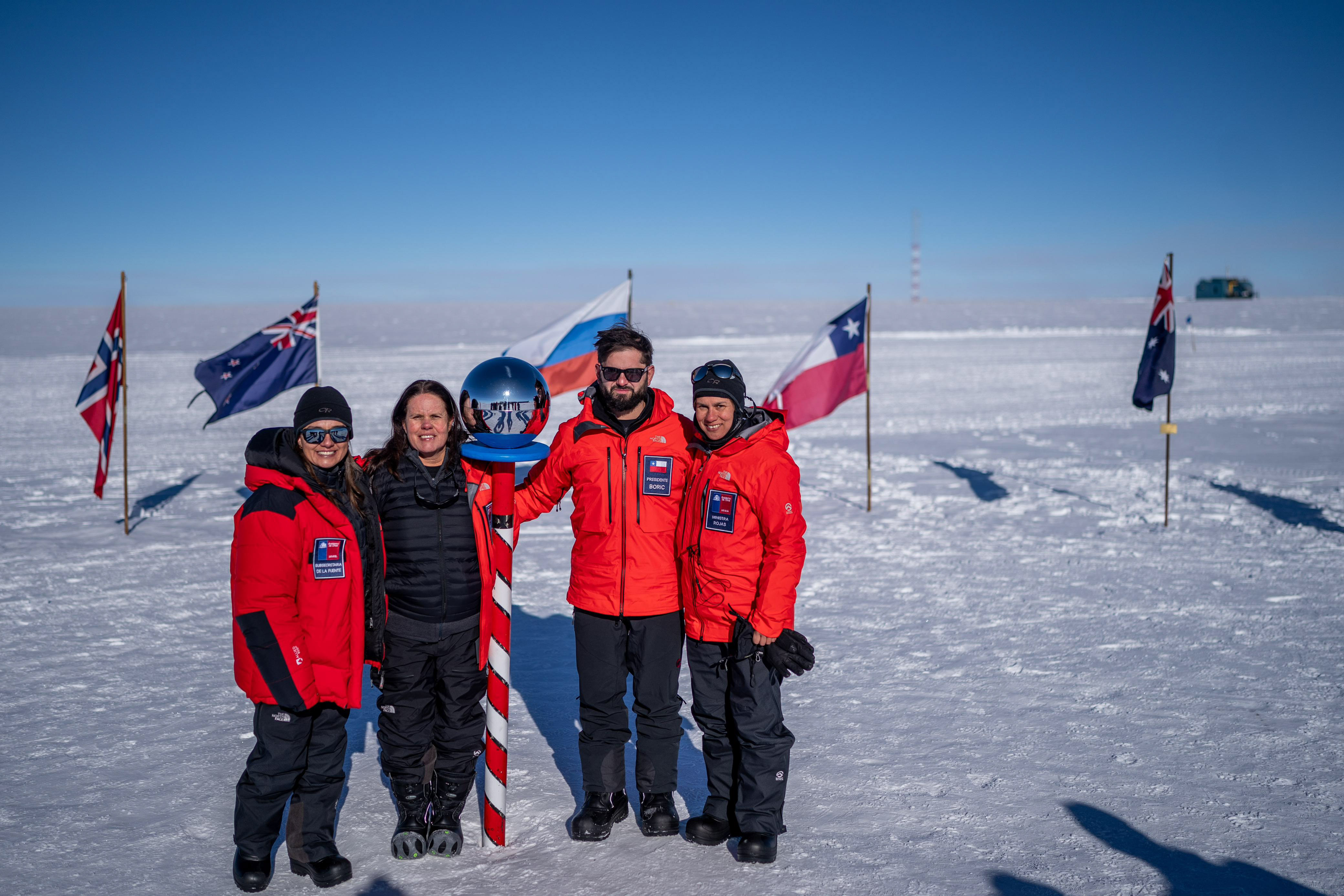
Gabriel Boric, Maya Fernández Allende and Maisa Rojas at the South Pole on January 4, 2025

Operación Estrella Polar III (Operation Polar Star III) was a visit by Chilean President Gabriel Boric to the South Pole in January 2025 alongside a high-level delegation. It was the first visit by a Latin American head of state and the third visit by a head of government to the South Pole. The trip was conducted in cooperation with the Instituto Antártico Chileno (INACH) and the Chilean Army.

== Background ==
Operación Estrella Polar III was the third Chilean expedition to the South Pole, following expeditions in November 1984 and January 1995. Chilean President Gabriel González Videla was the first sitting head of state in the world to visit Antarctica in 1948.

Previously, two heads of government had traveled to the South Pole: New Zealand Prime Minister Helen Clark in 2007 and Norwegian Prime Minister Jens Stoltenberg for the 100th anniversary of Roald Amundsen's expedition to the South Pole in 2011.

== Preparation ==
During the handover ceremony of the icebreaker Almirante Viel at the Chilean naval base in Talcahuano in July 2024, Gabriel Boric announced his intention to visit the South Pole in January 2025. He saw the visit as continuing Chile's tradition of responsibility towards Antarctica and, in this context, also highlighted Gabriel González Videla's visit to Antarctica in 1948, which was the first by a sitting head of state. The aim of the trip was to support research on Antarctica in the context of climate change and environmental protection. At the time, January 9, 2025, was announced as the start date of the trip, but Boric traveled to the South Pole a few days earlier.

== Trip ==
On January 2, Gabriel Boric and his entourage traveled from the Pudahuel Air Base in a Chilean Air Force Boeing 767 to Chabunco Air Base near Punta Arenas, where they arrived at 00:30 on Friday, January 3. From there, they continued their journey in two Gulfstream IV aircraft to the Chilean base at Union Glacier in Chilean Antarctica. Gabriel Boric is the second Chilean president, after Sebastián Piñera, to visit the base at Union Glacier. From the Union Glacier base, they flew to the Amundsen-Scott South Pole Station in two DHC-6 Twin Otter aircraft and two Black Hawk helicopters. After two hours at the South Pole, Gabriel Boric and his delegation traveled first to the Union Glacier and from there to the Punta Arenas Air Base.

Following his visit to the South Pole, Boric reaffirmed Chilean sovereignty over Antarctica and spoke out against the exploitation of Antarctic mineral resources. Chile is one of the seven countries that claim part of Antarctica and also one of the first twelve countries to have signed the Antarctic Treaty.

Operación Estrella Polar III also aimed to analyze the energy efficiency of the Roald Amundsen South Pole Station and to transfer the findings to the Chilean bases in Antarctica.

=== Notable people ===
- Gabriel Boric, President of Chile
- Maya Fernandez Allende, Defense Minister of Chile
- Maisa Rojas, Environment Minister of Chile
- Gloria de la Fuente, Chilean Undersecretary for International Relations
- General Hugo Rodriguez, head of the Chilean Air Force (flew one of the Black Hawks)
- General Javier Iturriaga del Campo, head of the Chilean Army
- Admiral Juan Andrés de la Maza, head of the Chilean Navy
- Natalia Henríquez Bravo, the first Chilean female pilot to land at the South Pole.
- Gino Casassa, Director of the Chilean Institute of Antarctica (INACH)
