= Ripamonti =

Ripamonti is an Italian surname.

== List of people with the surname ==
- Camillo Ripamonti (1919–1997), Italian politician
- Giuseppe Ripamonti (1573–1643), Italian historian
- Macarena Ripamonti (born 1991), Chilean politician
- Manuel Luis Pellegrini Ripamonti (born 1953), Chilean football manager
- Maria Ripamonti (1909–1954), Italian nun
- Nicola Ripamonti (born 1990), Italian canoeist
- Umberto Ripamonti (born 1895, date of death unknown), Italian cyclist

== See also ==
- Julio Ripamonti Base
- Carlos P. Ripamonte (1874–1968), Argentine painter
- Rigamonti
