= Collins Base =

Collins Station
- Antarctic base
- Location of Collins Station in Antarctica
- Coordinates: 62°10′09″S 58°51′07″W
- Country: Chile
- Location in Antarctica: Fildes Peninsula; King George Island; South Shetland Islands
- Administered by: Instituto Antártico Chileno
- Established: 2006

Population
  - Summer: Up to 6
  - Winter: 0
- Type: Seasonal
- Period: Summer
- Status: Operational
- Website: Refugio Collins Instituto Antártico Chileno

The Collins base is an Antarctic shelter located in the Collins Glacier that is in the Collins Bay in the Fildes Peninsula, King George Island. It was inaugurated at the 2006–2007 season and is administrated by the Instituto Antártico Chileno (INACH).

It has capacity for two persons in summer, and it is used for scientific research. It has communications with VHF radio and the logistical support comes from the Profesor Julio Escudero Base by sea.

The base replaced one with the same name, built in 1969, was given to the Uruguayan Antarctic Institute in 1984 and dismantled in 1989, located in what today is the Artigas Base from Uruguay.

== See also ==
- List of Antarctic research stations
- List of Antarctic field camps
