= Julio Ripamonti Base =

Julio Ripamonti Station
- Antarctic base
- Location of Julio Ripamonti Station in Antarctica
- Coordinates: 62°12′36″S 58°56′03″W
- Country: Chile
- Location in Antarctica: Ardley Island; King George Island; South Shetland Islands
- Administered by: Instituto Antártico Chileno
- Established: January 1982
- Elevation: 50 m (160 ft)

Population
  - Summer: 4
  - Winter: 0
- Type: Seasonal
- Period: Summer
- Status: Operational
- Website: Refugio Julio Ripamonti INACH

Julio Ripamonti Base is a Chilean Antarctic research base. It is located on Ardley Island in the South Shetland Islands. The base is located 50 meters above sea level, on a solid rock surface, 100 meters from the sea. Opened in 1982, it can accommodate a crew of four people. The installation consists of four modules. Julio Ripamonti is located near a colony of gentoo penguins.

== See also ==
- List of Antarctic research stations
- List of Antarctic field camps
