= Penfold Point =

Headland in the South Shetland Islands

Penfold Point (62°59′S 60°35′W) is a point which forms the northwest side of the entrance to Whalers Bay, Deception Island, in the South Shetland Islands. Named for Lieutenant Commander D.N. Penfold, Royal Navy, who conducted a survey of the island during 1948–49. Notable places in the area include: Ronald Hill and Cathedral Crags.
