= Estación Polar Científica Conjunta Glaciar Unión =

Union Glacier
- Antarctic base
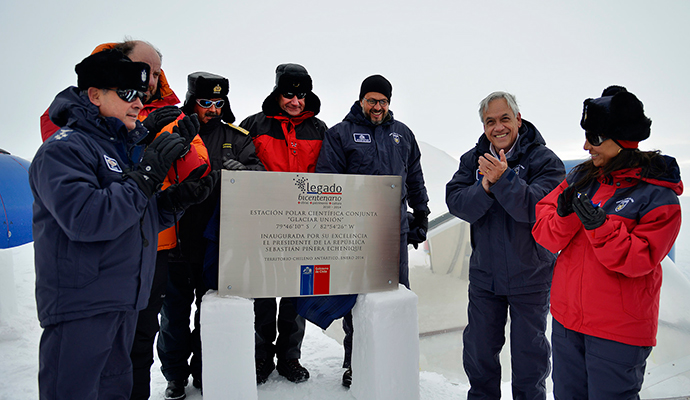
- President Piñera inaugurating the base in 2014.

- Location of Union Glacier in Antarctica
- Coordinates: 79°46′05″S 83°15′42″W
- Country: Chile
- Location in Antarctica: Union Glacier; Ellsworth Mountains; Ellsworth Land; Antarctica
- Administered by: Chilean Antarctic Institute
- Established: 4 January 2014
- Type: Seasonal
- Status: Operational
- Activities: List: Glaciology; Meteoroly; Microbiology

The Estación Polar Científica Conjunta Glaciar Unión (or Union Glacier Joint Scientific Polar Station) or Union Glacier Station is a summer Antarctic base of Chile, situated on Union Glacier in the Ellsworth Mountains. It is jointly operated from November to January by the Chilean Antarctic Institute and the three armed forces of Chile. It was inaugurated on 4 January 2014 by Chilean President Sebastián Piñera Echeñique.

In 2013, the Antarctic stations Teniente Arturo Parodi Alister and Antonio Huneeus were dismantled and their equipment was transferred to Union Glacier Station. This followed the relocation in November 2010 of the operations of the private American company Antarctic Logistics & Expeditions LLC, which has operated the landing strip on Union Glacier since December 2008 and also runs Union Glacier Camp.

After the American base Amundsen-Scott and the Chinese base Kunlun, Union Glacier Station is the nearest active base to the South Pole, located 1080 km away.

== See also ==
- List of Antarctic research stations
- List of Antarctic field camps
- Crime in Antarctica
