= Braillard Point =

Braillard Point (62°12′42″S 58°54′56″W) is a headland forming the northeast end of Ardley Island, off the southwest end of King George Island in the South Shetland Islands. It was charted and named by DI personnel on the Discovery II in 1935, for Able Seaman A. T. Braillard, a member of the crew in 1931–33 and 1933–35. The island has been designated an Antarctic Specially Protected Area (ASPA 150) because of the importance of its seabird colonies.

== Structures ==
A Chilean semi-permanent summer-only research shelter Ripamonti II (former Alfred Wegener Institute hut, ceded to Chile by Germany in 1997) lies almost 100 metres southwest from Braillard Point on the south eastern part, inside the penguin breeding colonies.
