= Lake CECs =

Subglacial lake in West Antarctica

- Location of CECs Lake near Union Glacier.
- Coordinates: 79.2470°S 87.6411°W
- Lake type: Subglacial
- Basin countries: Antarctica (Territory only claimed by Chile)
- Surface area: 18 km^{2} (10 mi^{2})
- Surface elevation: ~ −600 m (−2,000 ft) sea level; −2.65 km (−8,700 ft) ice surface
- Islands: 0

Lake CECs is a subglacial lake in Antarctica at approximately latitude 80°S. It has an estimated area of 18 km^{2}. The territory where the lake is located, some 160 km from Union Glacier, is claimed only by Chile.

The lake is located in a buffer zone of three major West Antarctic glaciers. The movement of the ice is almost nonexistent and the area is in a situation of low disturbance. This allows the body of water to be extremely stable, with minimal mass exchanges with its environment. This favors the hypothesis that the lake could support endemic life, which would have developed in extreme isolation.

Lake CECs was discovered by the Chilean research center Centro de Estudios Científicos (CECs). The first signs of the lake were detected during Antarctic summer in January 2014, when a mobile research station team journeyed through the central plateau of West Antarctica. Measurements showed unusual subglacial radar returns, indicating the presence of a waterbody at some 2.6 km depth under the ice. An initial mapping with an ice-penetrating radar confirmed the finding. The research team returned in summer of 2015 and the mapping was completed. The findings were published in a Geophysical Research Letters report by four members of the CECs Glaciology Laboratory.
