= Carl Dørnberger =

Norwegian painter (1864–1940)

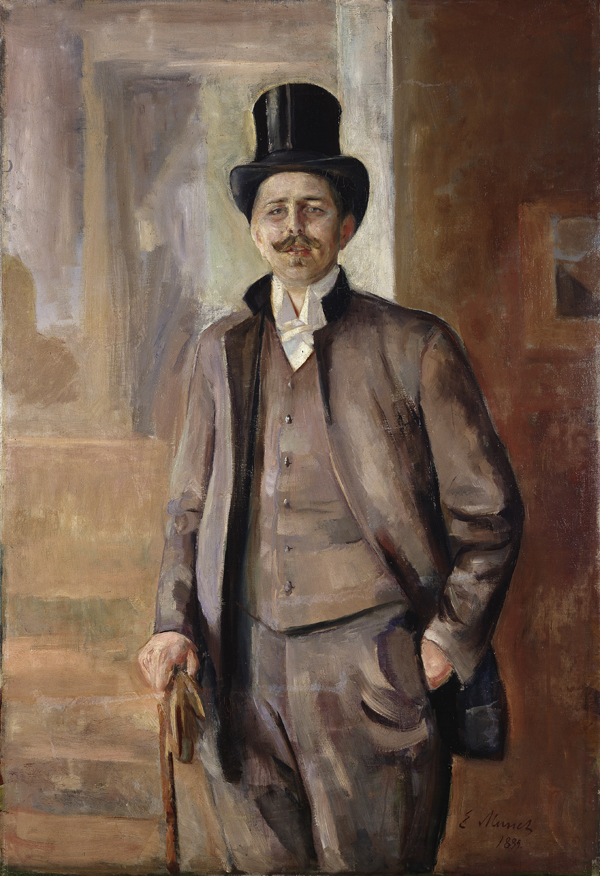
Carl Dørnberger; portrait by Edvard Munch (1889)

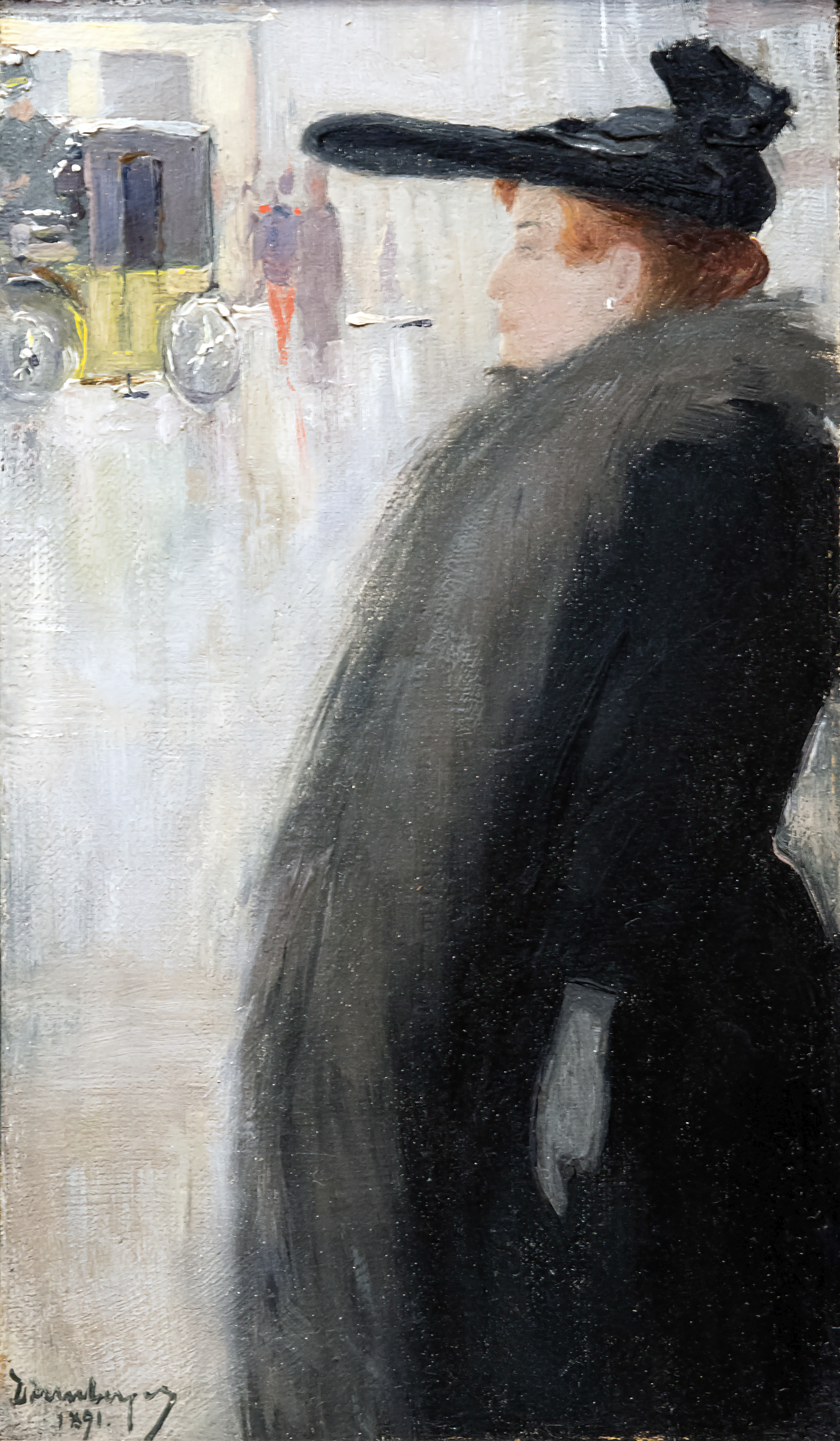
Woman in Montmartre (1891)

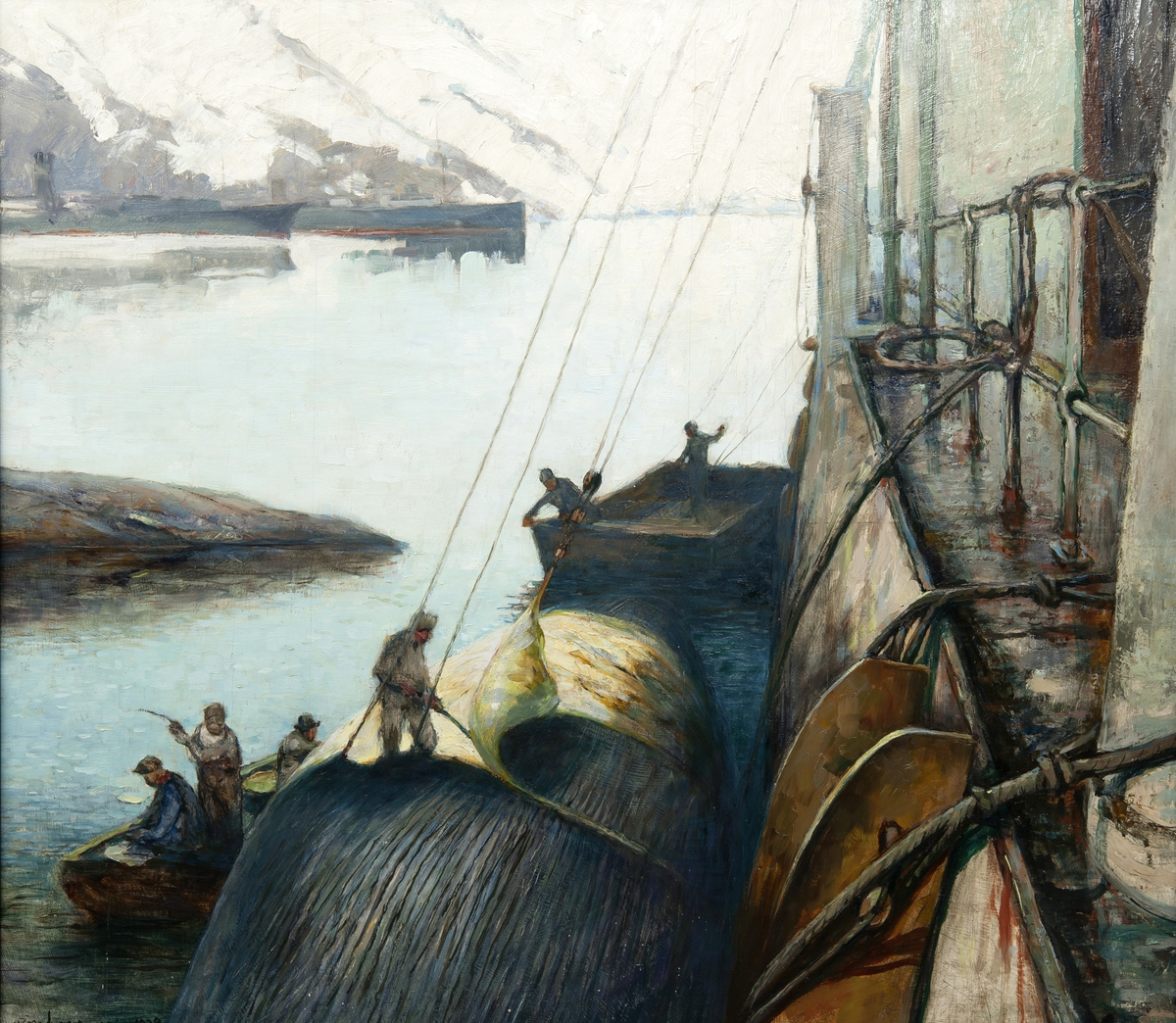
Whalers Bay, Deception Island

Carl Johannes Andreas Adam Dørnberger (23 September 1864 - 8 July 1940) was a Norwegian painter. He principally performed naturalistic and figurative images.

== Life and career ==
Carl Johannes Andreas Adam Dørnberger was born at Nøtterø Municipality in Vestfold, Norway. He was the son of Johann Christopher Dörnberger from Nuremberg and Augusta Charlotte Wilhelmine Luise Mönch from Stralsund. His German-born father worked as master brewer in Tønsberg. When he was eight years old the family traveled back to Germany, where he lived until became a student of David Arnesen (1818–1895) and Johan Jacob Bennetter (1822–1904) in Christiania (now Oslo) at the age of seventeen. In 1883 he traveled to Paris where he studied under several artists including William-Adolphe Bouguereau of Académie Julian.

He debuted at the Høstutstillingen in 1887, and had his first solo exhibition in 1900. That same year he married Lina Gurine Berg Isachen, and they had a daughter, Gro Franciska Dørnberger (born 1904). Dørnberger had many famous artists in his circle, including Edvard Munch and Akseli Gallen-Kallela, who both painted portraits of him.

Around 1896 he moved to the Norwegian port town of Son in Akershus where he lived for the remainder of his life in his home known as "Dørnbergerhuset". Many of Dørnberger's works are motifs from Son, including the historic buildings in the town center and the steamer jetty lying below his house. He remained largely naturalist while painting landscapes, portraits, figurative studies and nautical scenes.

He was, for many, at least as well known for his eccentric lifestyle as for his art. In 1895 he acquired a wooden leg after breaking his leg which had to be amputated. He carried two pistols which he called "Kitty" and "Kitty's brother". In 1921 he shot an office manager in Hurum and wounded him. He was later acquitted by the court of law.

== Other sources ==
- Bjørn Linnestad (1989) Carl Johannes Andreas Adam Dørnberger: Maler og musketér (Vestby kunstforening ) ISBN 978-8299190701
