= Rigamonti =

Rigamonti is an Italian surname. Notable people with the surname include:

- Antonio Rigamonti (born 1949), Italian footballer
- Ernesto Rigamonti (1864–1942), Italian painter
- Flavia Rigamonti (born 1981), Swiss swimmer
- Mario Rigamonti (1922–1949), Italian footballer

== See also ==
- Ripamonti
