= Profesor Julio Escudero Base =

Julio Escudero Station
- Antarctic Station
- Location of Julio Escudero Station in Antarctica
- Coordinates: 62°12′05″S 58°57′44″W
- Country: Chile
- Location in Antarctica: King George Island; Antarctica
- Administered by: Instituto Antártico Chileno INACH
- Established: 5 February 1995
- Elevation: 10 m (33 ft)

Population (2017)
  - Summer: 60
  - Winter: 2
- UN/LOCODE: AQ ESC
- Type: Seasonal
- Period: Summer
- Status: Operational
- Activities: List: Microbiology; Molecular biology
- Website: Base Profesor Julio Escudero (INACH)

Professor Julio Escudero Base is a permanent Chilean Antarctic research base. It is located on King George Island just next to Base Presidente Eduardo Frei Montalva and within the civilian settlement of Villa Las Estrellas. It lies within the Antártica Chilean commune funded by the Antarctic Institute of the Ministry of Foreign Relations.

== See also ==
- List of Antarctic research stations
- List of Antarctic field camps
