= Walter Bertsch =

German SS and Nazi Party member (1900–1952)

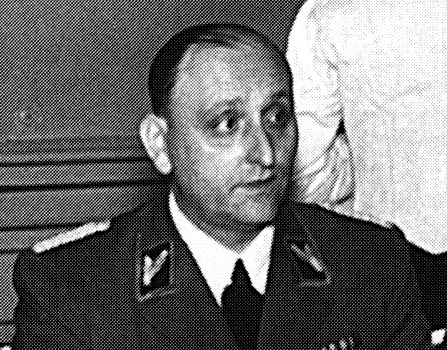
Walter Bertsch

Walter Bertsch (4 January 1900 in Oppenweiler - 5 January 1952 in Brno) was a German SS and Nazi Party member, who served as Minister of Economy and Labour in the Protectorate of Bohemia and Moravia. Along with Bernhard Adolf he was the most powerful manager of the Protectorate economy. Bertsch favored Germanization of the economy, but not at the expense of production especially in the arms industry. As a result some Czech businessmen had the opportunity to profit, even from Aryanization.

A longtime German civil servant, Bertsch was brought to Prague specifically to serve in the Protectorate government. Bertsch was a member of the Nazi Party and held the rank of SS-Oberführer. In 1948 he was found guilty by a Czechoslovak court of overseeing the transfer of funds from the National Bank of Czechoslovakia to the German government and sentenced to life imprisonment.
