= Whalers Bay (South Shetland Islands) =

Bay in Antarctica

Coordinates: 62°59′S 60°34′W

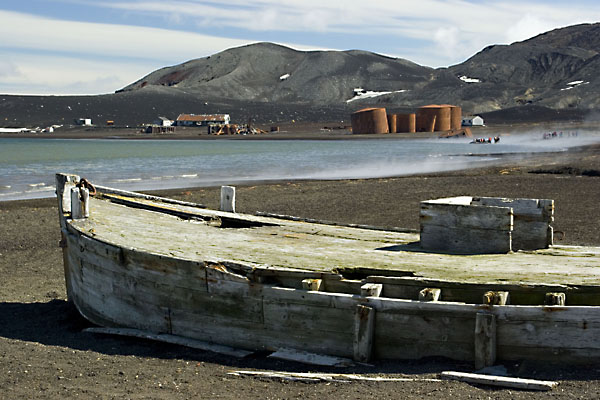
Remains from the Norwegian whaling station in Whalers Bay

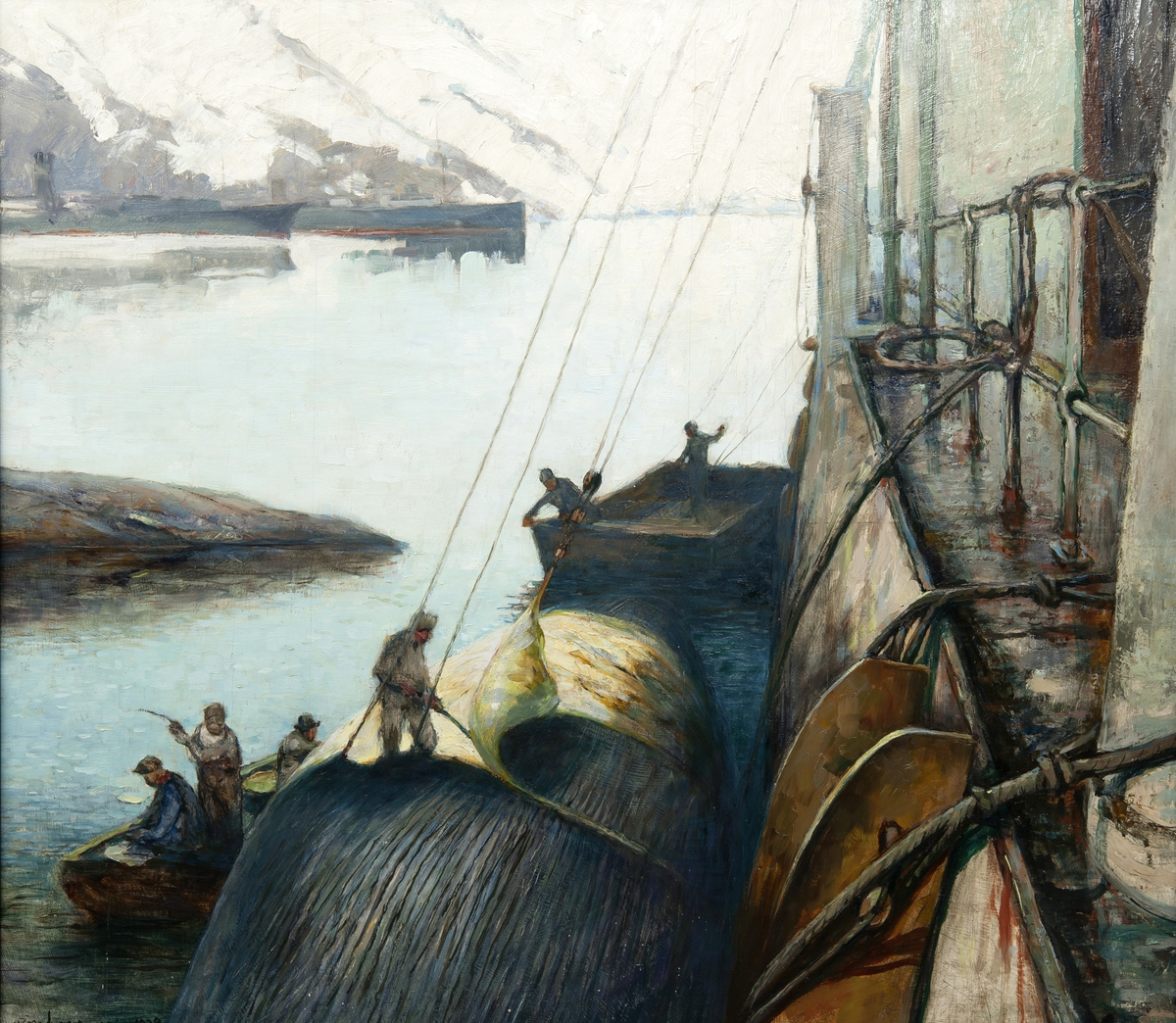
A blue whale being flensed at Whalers Bay. 1920s painting by Carl Dørnberger

Whalers Bay is a small bay entered between Fildes Point and Penfold Point at the east side of Port Foster, Deception Island, in the South Shetland Islands of Antarctica. The bay was so named by the French Antarctic Expedition, 1908–10, under Charcot, because of its use at that time by whalers.

== Historic site ==
The site has been designated a Historic Site or Monument (HSM 71), following a proposal by Chile and Norway to the Antarctic Treaty Consultative Meeting. It comprises all pre-1970 remains on the shore of the bay. These include artefacts and structural remains from the early whaling period (1906–1912) associated with Captain Adolfus Andresen of the Chilean Sociedad Ballenera de Magallanes, the Norwegian Hektor Whaling Station (1912–1931), the period of British scientific and mapping activity (1944–1969 by Operation Tabarin, Falkland Islands Dependencies Survey, British Antarctic Survey), and a cemetery containing 35 burials and a memorial to ten men lost at sea. It also commemorates and acknowledges the historic value of other events that occurred there.

== Graffiti incident ==
In December 2024, graffiti was discovered on a historic building in Whalers Bay, part of the former British Base B. On behalf of the UK Antarctic Heritage Trust, Oceanwide Expeditions, an expedition cruise operator, successfully organised a cleanup and restoration operation in January 2025. This was supported by the British Antarctic Survey, the International Association of Antarctica Tour Operators (IAATO), and the Foreign, Commonwealth and Development Office (FCDO).
