= Federación de Andinismo de Chile =

Federación de Andinismo de Chile (FEACH) is an umbrella organization of Chilean mountaineering clubs. Founded in 1942 as Federación de Ski y Andinismo de Chile, it originally had six member clubs. In 1955, the skiing and the mountaineering sections were split and FEACH currently has more than 20 affiliated clubs around Chile.

== Member clubs ==
List of member clubs
Name	City	Homepage
Clan de la Montaña	Valdivia	
Club Andino Alemán	Valparaíso	
Club de Andinismo Piramide	Santiago	
Club de Montaña Concepción	Concepción	
Club Deportivo de Montaña Arica	Arica	
Rama Universidad Católica del Norte	Antofagasta	
Rama Universidad de Chile	Santiago	
