= Ardley Island =

Island in Antarctica

- Location within Antarctica Location within Antarctic Peninsula

Geography
- Location: Antarctica
- Coordinates: 62°12′47″S 58°55′59″W

Administration
- Administered under the Antarctic Treaty System

Demographics
- Population: Data not available
- Ardley Island Light
- Foundation: concrete base
- Construction: fiber glass tower
- Height: 6 metres (20 ft)
- Shape: conical truncated tower
- Markings: orange and black horizontal band
- Power source: solar power
- Focal height: 45 metres (148 ft)
- Range: 6 nautical miles (11 km; 6.9 mi)
- Characteristic: Fl W 10s.

Ardley Island is an island 1.9 kilometres (1 nmi) long, lying in Maxwell Bay close off the south-west end of King George Island, in the South Shetland Islands of Antarctica. It was charted as a peninsula in 1935 by Discovery Investigations personnel of the Discovery II and named for Lieutenant R.A.B. Ardley, Royal Naval Reserve, an officer on the ship in 1929–31 and 1931–33. Aerial photography has since shown that the feature is an island with Braillard Point being the headland forming the northeast end of Ardley Island. It has been designated an Antarctic Specially Protected Area (ASPA 150) because of the importance of its seabird colonies.

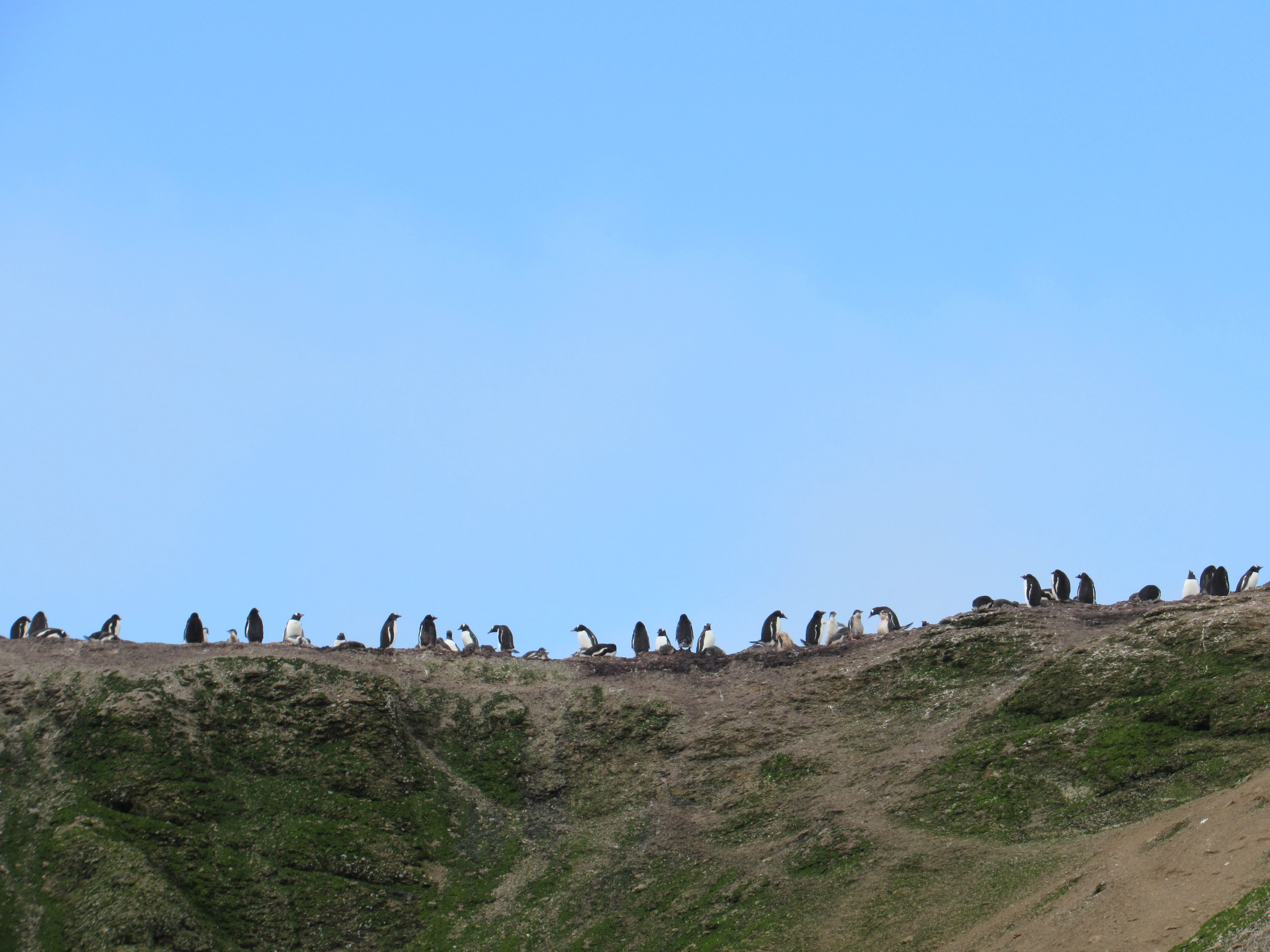
Gentoo penguins on Ardley Island, Antarctica

== Birds ==
The island has been identified as an Important Bird Area by BirdLife International because it supports a breeding colony of about 4,600 pairs of gentoo penguins, as well as smaller numbers of Adélie and chinstrap penguins, southern giant petrels, Wilson's and black-bellied storm petrels, Cape petrels, brown and south polar skuas, and Antarctic terns.

A 2016 study examined lake guano sediments and studied penguin population dynamics over 7,000 years. Three of five population growth phases were terminated by a sudden crash, due to volcanic eruptions from the active volcano of Deception Island, 120 km to the southwest.

== Research stations ==
=== Ballvé ===
There are also two Argentinean buildings in the area that make up the Ballvé Refuge, set up in 1953, approximately 50 meters east of Ripamonti I. An Argentinean radio beacon facilitates navigation, looking towards Maxwell Bay (Fildes Bay). All the structures described remain in the area year-round. The scientists come from King George Island for their expeditions.

=== Ripamonti I ===
There are two Chilean semi-permanent summer-only research shelters. Ripamonti I (62°12' S; 58°53' W) was established in 1982.

=== Ripamonti II ===
In the northern coast of Ardley, and Ripamonti II (former Alfred Wegener Institute hut, ceded to Chile by Germany in 1997) lies almost 100 metres southwest from Braillard Point on the south-eastern part, inside the penguin breeding colonies.

== See also ==
- List of lighthouses in Antarctica
- List of Antarctic and subantarctic islands
- List of Antarctic field camps
