= Centro de Estudios Científicos =

Chilean research institute

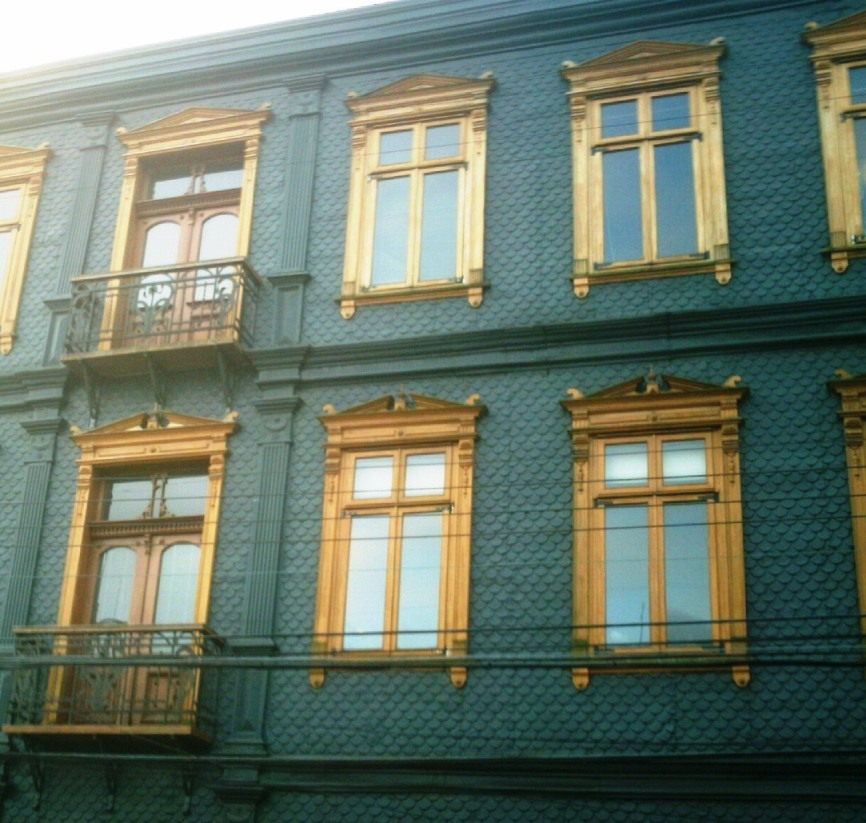
- Abbreviation: CECs
- Formation: 1984
- Type: private non-profit corporation
- Purpose: scientific research
- Location: Valdivia, Chile
- Official language: Spanish, English
- Director: Claudio Bunster
- Staff: 80
- Website: cecs.cl

Centro de Estudios Científicos (CECs; Center for Scientific Studies) is a private, non-profit corporation based in Valdivia, Chile, devoted to the development, promotion and diffusion of scientific research.

== History ==
CECs research areas include biophysics, molecular physiology, theoretical physics, glaciology and climate change.

The centre was created in 1984 as Centro de Estudios Científicos de Santiago, with a grant of 150,000 dollars a year (for three years) from the Tinker Foundation of New York City.

In 2004-2005 glaciologists from CECs organized the Chilean South Pole Expedition in collaboration with the Chilean Navy and Instituto Antártico Chileno.

CECs was founded in Santiago but is since 2000 housed in the recently modernized, German-style Hotel Schuster located by Valdivia River. Claudio Bunster, a physicist and winner of Chile's National Prize for Exact Sciences, is the director of CECs.

In 2014 CECs discovered what would be a subglacial lake in the West Antarctica, They investigated and concluded after a year that it is a lake, which was named Lake CECs in honor of the institution. The conclusion was published in Geophysical Research Letters on May 22, 2015. The authors of the discovery are Andrés Rivera, Jose Uribe, Rodrigo Zamora and Jonathan Oberreuter.
