= Instituto Antártico Chileno =

Chilean public service institution

Coordinates: 53.16307°S 70.90719°W

Chilean Antarctic Institute
- Instituto Antártico Chileno
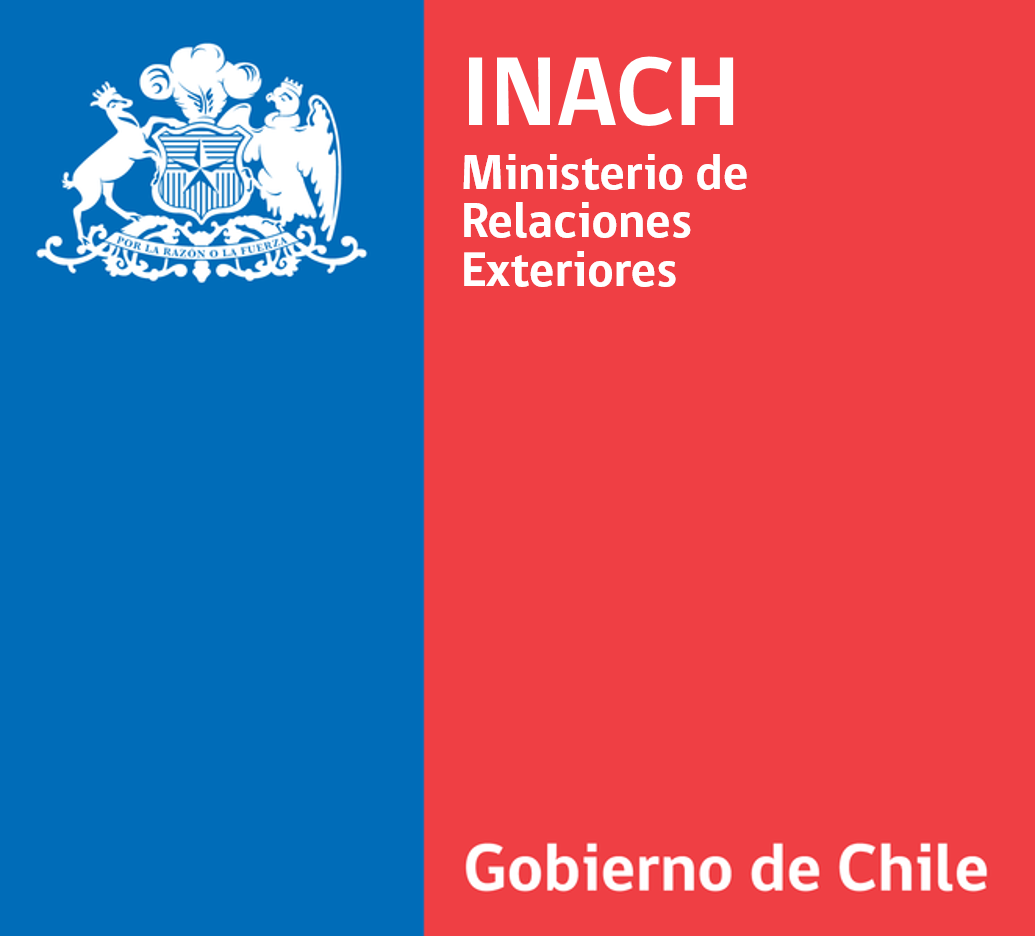

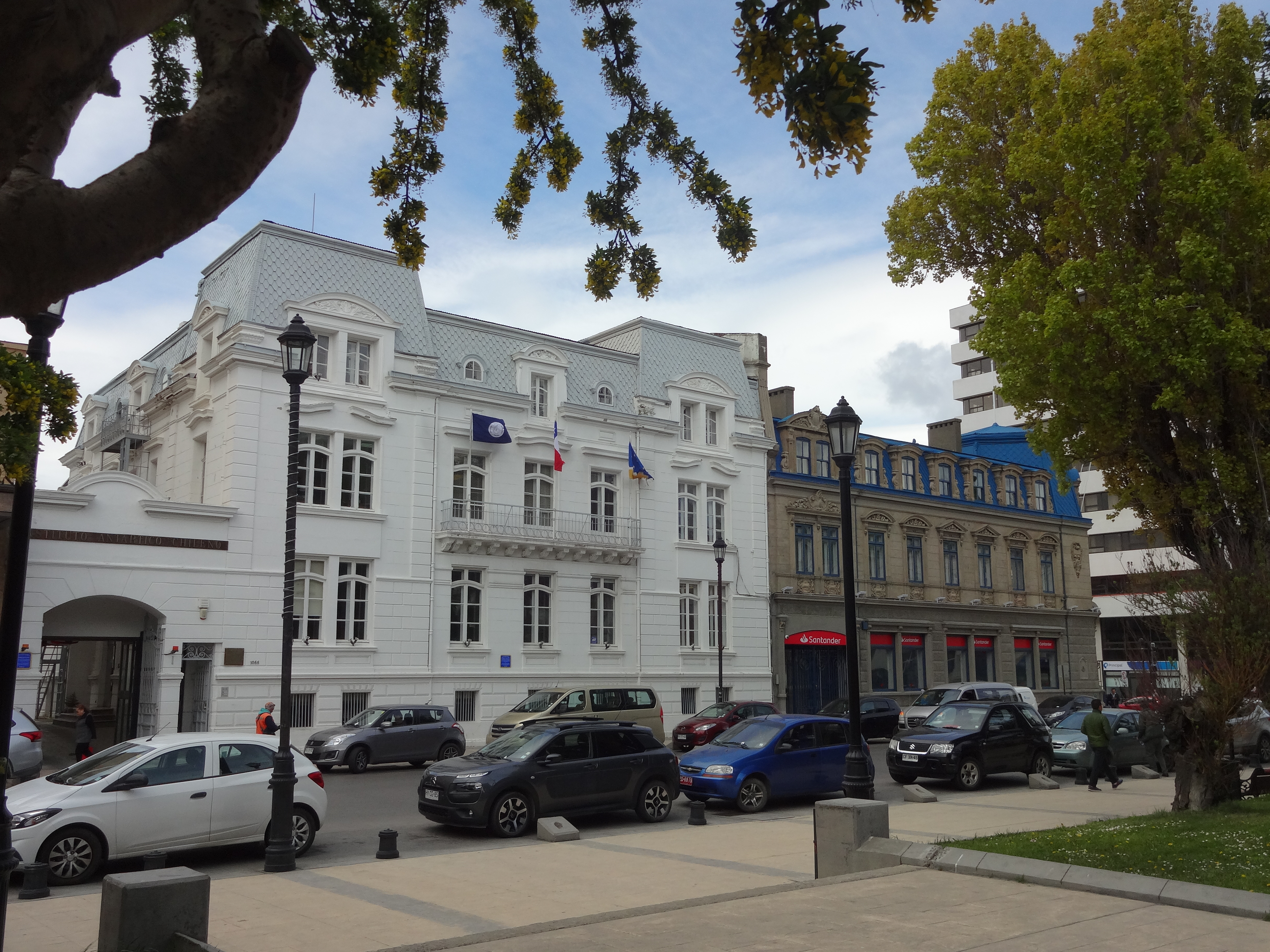
- INACH main headquarters in Punta Arenas

Agency overview
- Formed: September 10, 1963; 62 years ago
- Jurisdiction: Government of Chile
- Headquarters: Pl. Benjamín Muñoz Gamero 1055, Punta Arenas, Magallanes y la Antártica Chilena, Chile
- Annual budget: $7916154 CLP (2024)
- Parent department: Ministry of Foreign Affairs
- Parent agency: Council of Managers of National Antarctic Programs

The Chilean Antarctic Institute, known as INACH (Instituto Antártico Chileno), is a public service institution in charge of managing and coordinating scientific activities in the Chilean Antarctic Territory. It is the national Antarctic operator and has an active role in Antarctic affairs.

It was created by the Chilean government on September 10, 1963, and since 2003 it has had its main headquarters in Punta Arenas, capital of the Magallanes Region and Chilean Antarctica. In 2018, the INACH scientific boat, Karpuj, whose name in yagon means black eyebrow albatrosses and which allows the development of oceanography studies, entered into operations. Nature and conservation photographer Sergio Izquierdo documented an agency expedition to the Antarctic; the images won National Geographic in Spanish's Best Edit in 2019. The Antarctic Policy Council, led by Foreign Affairs Minister Andrés Allamand, has approved the 2021–2025 Antarctic Strategic Plan, which contains 103 projects, including the renovation of the scientific bases operated by the Chilean Antarctic Institute. In September 2021, the Chilean Antarctic Institute, Germany's International Cooperation Agency, and the Antarctica Foundation 21 have started working in energy options, assessing alternatives for the Chilean bases in Antarctica, avoiding CO_{2} emissions, such as green hydrogen. In 2023, Antarctic Division of the Ministry of Foreign Affairs of Chile and of the Polar Regions Department of the Foreign, Commonwealth and Development Office in the United Kingdom, together with representatives of the INACH and the British Antarctic Survey agreed to open bilateral dialogue to explore possibilities of increased collaboration.

== The International Antarctic Center ==
In 2017, an international competition was held for the design of the International Antarctic Centre (Centro Antártico Internacional), which would be built in Punta Arenas and would be managed by the Chilean Antarctic Institute. The construction of this 2,581 square meter building began in July 2018 and ended in February 2022 with a cost of $10,135 million, financed by the regional Government. On September 30, 2021, the Magellan Regional Council approved by a majority funding for the construction of the International Antarctic Centre.

== See also ==
- Instituto Antártico Argentino
- British Antarctic Survey
