= Navarino =

Navarino or Navarin may refer to:

== Battle ==
- Battle of Navarino, 1827 naval battle off Navarino, Greece, now known as Pylos

== Geography ==
- Navarino is the former name of Pylos, a Greek town on the Ionian Sea, where the 1827 battle took place
  - Old Navarino castle, medieval fortress at Pylos
  - New Navarino fortress, Ottoman fortress at Pylos
- Navarino, Wisconsin, a town, United States
- Navarino (community), Wisconsin, an unincorporated community, United States
- Navarino, former name of the Commune Cabo de Hornos, Chile
- Navarino Island, an island located in the Commune of Cabo de Hornos, Antártica Chilena Province, Chile
  - Puerto Navarino, Chilean port facing the Beagle Channel in western Navarino Island, Chile

== Vessels ==
- Russian battleship Navarin (1891)
- Navarin, Russian Borodino-class battlecruiser, launched 1916
- Navarin, French Navarin-class minesweeper, launched 1918
- Navarino, British cargo ship, sunk in 1942 as part of Convoy PQ 17

== Other uses ==
- Navarin (food), a French stew of lamb or mutton
- Navarinos, a race of shape-changing tourist aliens in the Doctor Who story Delta and the Bannermen
