= Río Guanaco =

- Region: Magallanes
- Province: Antártica Chilena
- Municipalidad: Cabo de Hornos
- Comuna: Cabo de Hornos

Population (2002 census)
  - Total: 58
- Time zone: UTC−04:00 (Chilean Standard)
  - Summer (DST): UTC−03:00 (Chilean Daylight)
- Area code: Country + town = 56 + ?

Río Guanaco is a hamlet (Spanish: caserío) on Navarino Island in the Tierra del Fuego archipelago in southern Chile. It is part of the Cabo de Hornos commune in Antártica Chilena Province.
