= Puerto Williams =

City in Magallanes y Antártica Chilena Region, Chile

- City
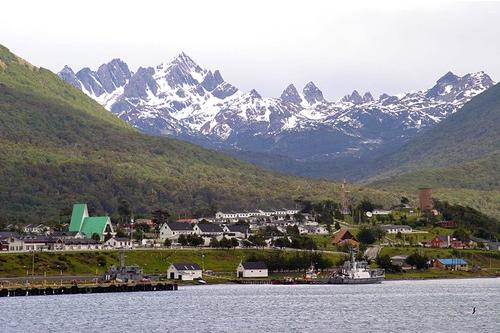
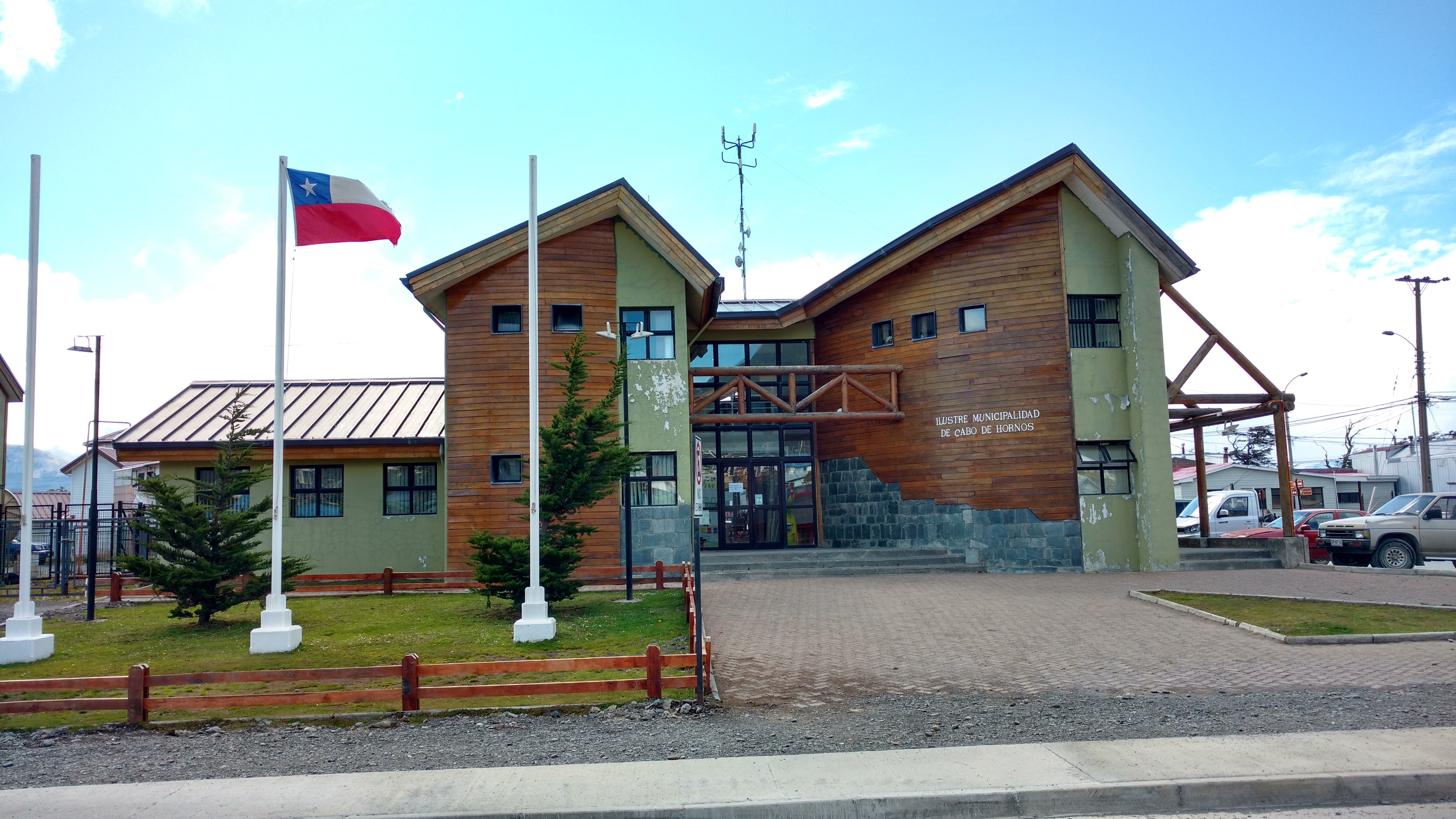
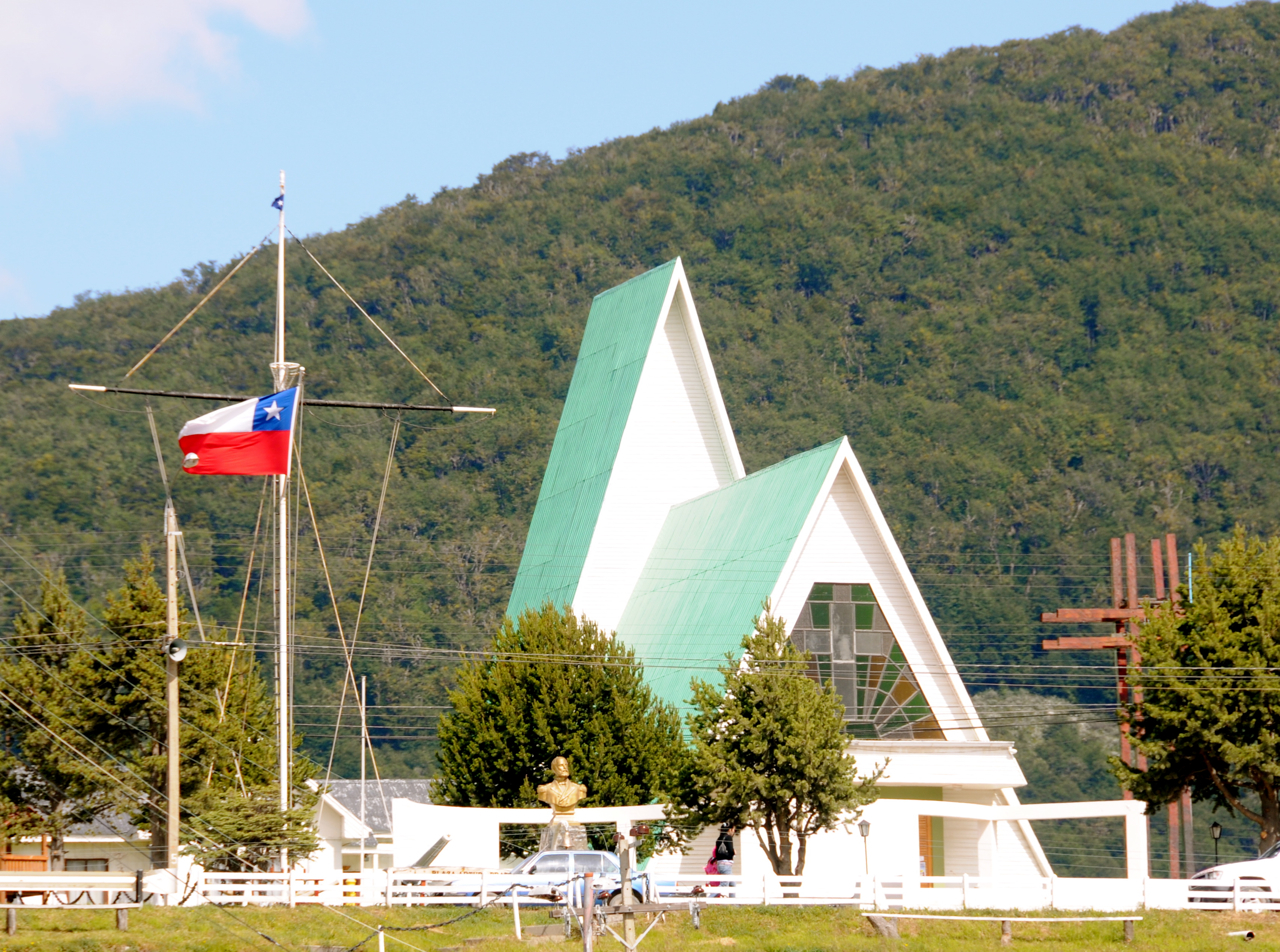
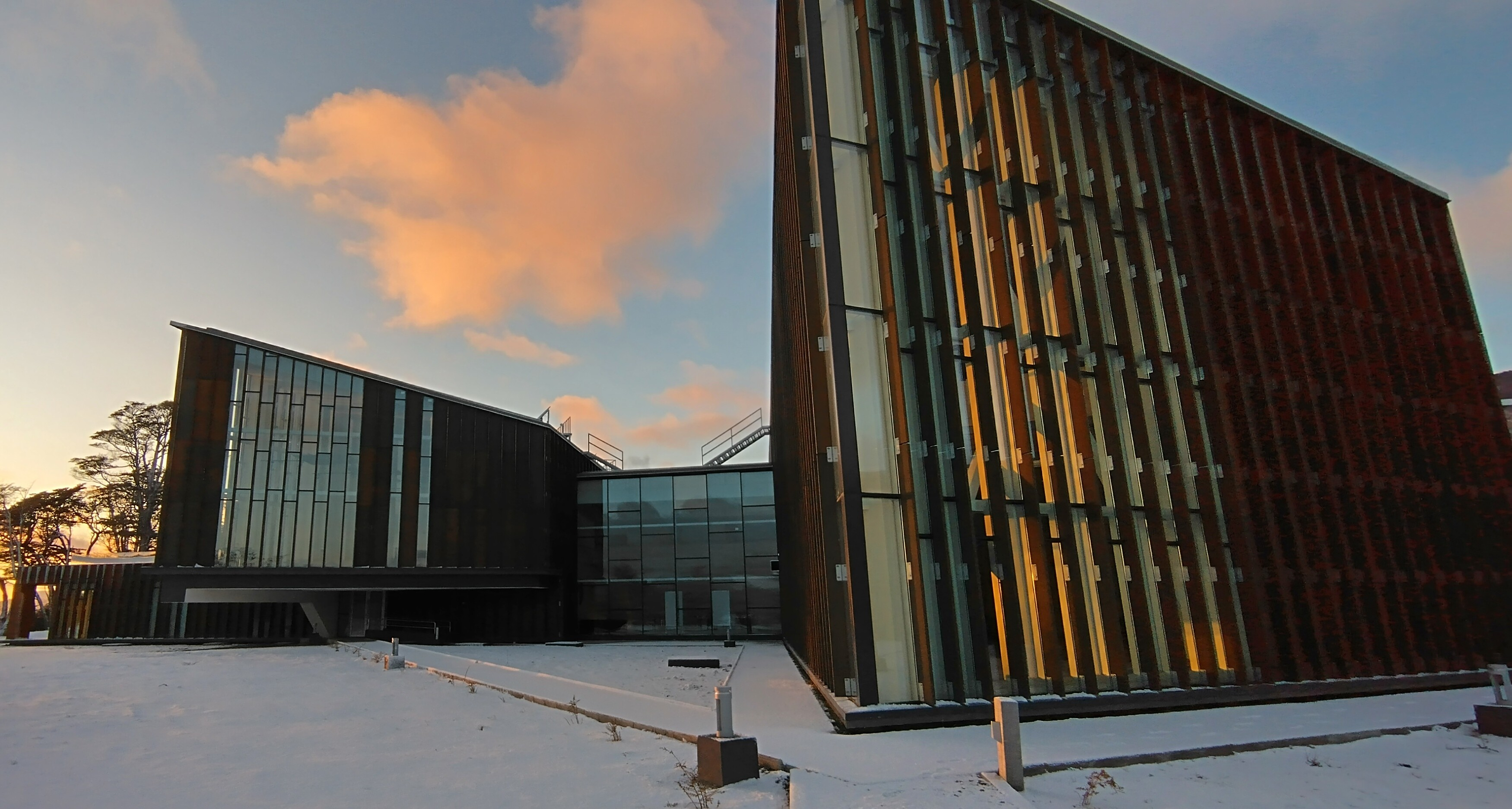
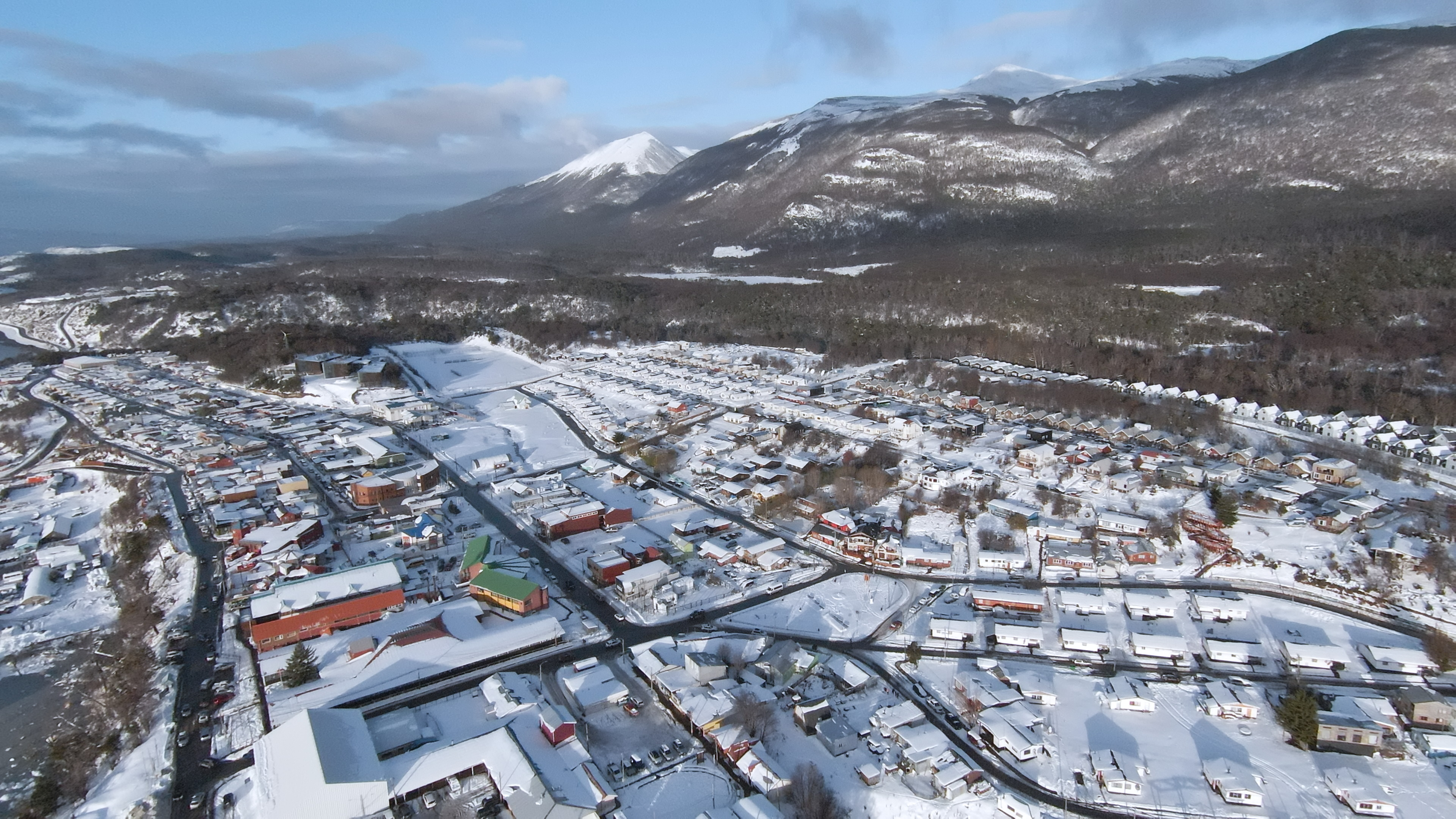
- View of Puerto Williams with the Dientes de Navarino mountains (the 'Teeth of Navarino') in the background Municipality of Cabo de Hornos Local Naval Catholic Church Cape Horn Subantarctic Center (CHIC) Puerto Williams in winter

- Flag Coat of arms Location in Chile Puerto Williams (Chile)
- Interactive map of Puerto Williams
- Coordinates: 54°56′S 67°37′W
- Country: Chile
- Region: Magallanes y Antártica Chilena
- Province: Antártica Chilena
- Commune: Cabo de Hornos
- Founded as: Puerto Luisa
- Founded: 21 November 1953
- Named for: John Williams Wilson

Government
  - Type: Municipality
  - Alcalde: Patricio Fernández

Population (2024)
  - Total: 1,608
- Time zone: UTC−3 (CLST)

Puerto Williams (Spanish: [ˈpweɾto ˈ(ɣ)wiljams]; Spanish for "Port Williams") is a town, port and naval base on Navarino Island in Chile. It faces the Beagle Channel. It has a population of 2,874, including both naval personnel and civilians. Puerto Williams claims the title of world's southernmost city.

The city is the capital of the Chilean Antarctic Province, one of the four provinces in the Magellan and Chilean Antarctica Region. It also administers the communes of Chilean Antarctic Territory and Cabo de Hornos.

The settlement was founded in 1953, and was first named Puerto Luisa. The town was later named after John Williams Wilson, a British man who founded Fuerte Bulnes, the first settlement in the Strait of Magellan. It has served primarily as a naval base for Chile. The Chilean Navy runs the Guardiamarina Zañartu Airport and hospital, as well as nearby meteorological stations. Since the late 20th century, the number of navy personnel has decreased in Puerto Williams and the civilian population has increased. In that period, tourism and support of scientific research have contributed to an increase in economic activity.

The port attracts tourists going to Cape Horn or Antarctica; its tourism industry developed around the concept of "the world's southernmost city". Based on some definitions of what constitutes a city, Puerto Williams could in fact be the southernmost city in the world. However, others dispute this because of the small settlement size and population in favor of Ushuaia or Punta Arenas. Chilean and Argentine media, a bilateral agreement between Chile and Argentina, and the Puerto Williams administration identify it as the southernmost city in the world.

Puerto Williams is the port of entry and major hub for scientific activity linked to Antarctica and the islands south of Isla Grande de Tierra del Fuego. The University of Magallanes has a university center in Puerto Williams. Weather stations and lighthouses at Cape Horn and Diego Ramírez Islands are supplied from Puerto Williams. The town has been a base for Chile to assert sovereignty around Cape Horn and support its Antarctic bases.

Puerto Williams also serves as a provision and service center for fishermen. The Navy is based here in part to enforce national fishing rights in the exclusive economic zone around the southern part of Tierra del Fuego, where lucrative Lithodes santolla fishing is an important industry.

== History ==
The Yahgan people, indigenous to southern Chile, are believed to have migrated to this area more than 10,000 years ago and established their traditional hunter-gatherer culture. Europeans first came across them and the area in the early sixteenth century. It was not until the 19th century that Europeans began to be interested in the area for development; its towns had sometimes supplied whaling ships.

At the end of the 19th century, gold was discovered in the region, attracting masses of migrants and immigrants seeking fortunes. By 1890 there were approximately 300 goldminers in the Picton, Lennox and Nueva islands and Puerto Toro which was founded in 1892. Puerto Navarino, on the west side of the Navarino island, was founded in June 1938. In addition, some of the islands were developed to support sheep ranching, and meat and wool exports became important.

Puerto Williams was founded 1953, developed primarily as a naval base for Chile. Its naval hospital of 463 m^{2} (today 638 m^{2}) opened in 1960. In 2002 the electrical power supply was transferred from the Chilean Navy to a private provider.

According to the Treaty of Peace and Friendship of 1984 between Chile and Argentina, Puerto Williams is the start point for vessels of all nations in traffic between the Straits of Magellan and Argentine ports in the Beagle Channel.

== Demography ==
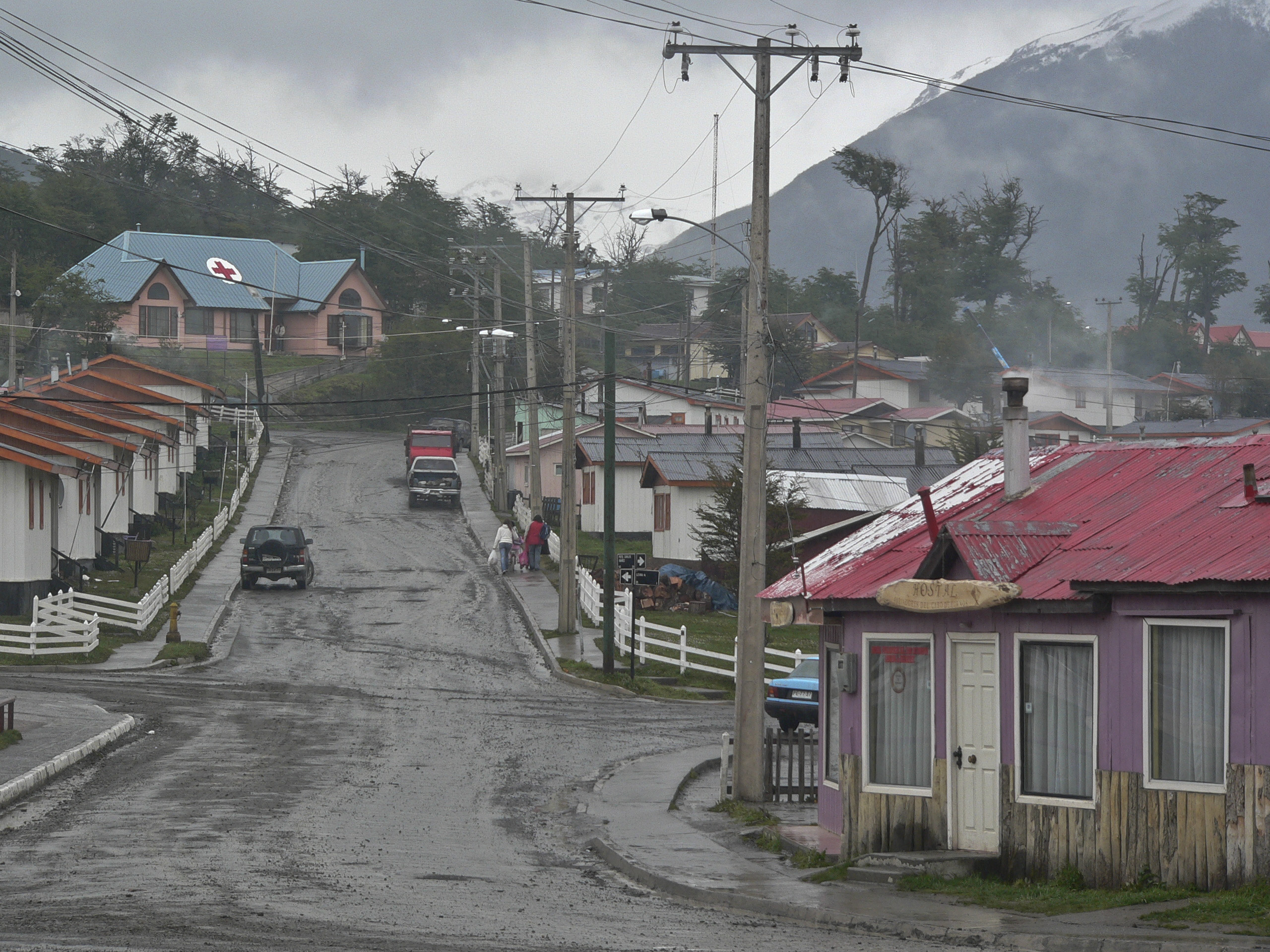
Puerto Williams street, showing the Naval Hospital in the background

Between 1982 and 2002, the population of Puerto Williams grew from 1,059 to 2,874. Since 1982, Puerto Williams has been classified as an urban entity by Chile's National Statistics Institute (INE), although the department generally classifies a city as an urban entity with more than 5,000 residents.

== Local celebrations ==
Glorias Navales Regata: In the last week of May, the city holds a sailing competition attracting international participants. The competition is on its 7th season and has more than 300 participants every year. The journey starts from the city's port and takes the fjords route. The regatta is part of the Chilean Navy's Month of the Sea activities that commemorate the Naval Battle of Iquique in 1879.

Fiesta de la nieve ("Snow Festival"): Celebrating the winter season in July, the city celebrates the winter with snow games, cars and rodeos, in a celebration that lasts 6 days.

== Climate ==
The climate of Puerto Williams is a subpolar oceanic climate (Cfc) bordering closely on a tundra climate (ET) according to the Köppen climate classification. The summers are short and cool while the winters are long, wet, but moderate. Rainfall is around 512.3 mm (20 in) a year and temperatures are steady throughout the year. Snowfall can occur in summer. The cold and wet summers help preserve glaciers. Although the area around the town is well-forested, exposed areas at some distance from or altitude above it have a sub-Antarctic climate typical of tundra, which makes the growth of trees impossible.

Climate data for Puerto Williams (Guardia Marina Zañartu Airport) 1991–2020, extremes 1968–present
Month	Jan	Feb	Mar	Apr	May	Jun	Jul	Aug	Sep	Oct	Nov	Dec	Year
Record high °C (°F)	25.2 (77.4)	26.1 (79.0)	24.0 (75.2)	22.2 (72.0)	17.5 (63.5)	18.0 (64.4)	15.9 (60.6)	14.8 (58.6)	18.6 (65.5)	22.8 (73.0)	24.2 (75.6)	26.0 (78.8)	26.1 (79.0)
Mean daily maximum °C (°F)	15.4 (59.7)	14.7 (58.5)	14.8 (58.6)	11.4 (52.5)	8.5 (47.3)	5.5 (41.9)	5.7 (42.3)	7.5 (45.5)	9.7 (49.5)	11.4 (52.5)	12.9 (55.2)	14.4 (57.9)	11.0 (51.8)
Daily mean °C (°F)	10.3 (50.5)	9.9 (49.8)	9.4 (48.9)	6.6 (43.9)	4.0 (39.2)	2.0 (35.6)	1.9 (35.4)	3.4 (38.1)	4.8 (40.6)	6.4 (43.5)	7.6 (45.7)	9.3 (48.7)	6.3 (43.3)
Mean daily minimum °C (°F)	5.2 (41.4)	5.0 (41.0)	3.9 (39.0)	1.7 (35.1)	−0.6 (30.9)	−1.6 (29.1)	−2.0 (28.4)	−0.8 (30.6)	−0.2 (31.6)	1.4 (34.5)	2.3 (36.1)	4.2 (39.6)	1.5 (34.7)
Record low °C (°F)	−2.6 (27.3)	−3.0 (26.6)	−5.1 (22.8)	−5.8 (21.6)	−6.4 (20.5)	−12.6 (9.3)	−10.5 (13.1)	−8.6 (16.5)	−9.8 (14.4)	−5.0 (23.0)	−6.4 (20.5)	−2.0 (28.4)	−12.6 (9.3)
Average precipitation mm (inches)	52.0 (2.05)	53.2 (2.09)	48.1 (1.89)	40.0 (1.57)	37.8 (1.49)	45.3 (1.78)	33.7 (1.33)	36.0 (1.42)	32.1 (1.26)	30.1 (1.19)	40.2 (1.58)	48.1 (1.89)	496.6 (19.55)
Average precipitation days (≥ 1.0 mm)	10.6	9.4	8.2	7.3	6.9	7.6	7.0	6.2	6.3	6.9	8.2	9.9	94.5
Source 1: Dirección Meteorológica de Chile
Source 2: NOAA (precipitation days 1991–2020)

== Tourism ==
Tourism is one of the main economic activities of Puerto Williams. Most lodgings for tourists are hostels. Several trails for multi-day hikes and back-packing trips have been developed in the Dientes de Navarino mountains south of Puerto Williams. A five-day hiking circuit passes around the jagged pinnacles known as the Dientes de Navarino. The trail passes peaks known as Cerro Clem and Montes Lindenmayer, named in 2001 by the Chilean Ministry of Natural Resources for the author of the Lonely Planet guide.

Remains of Yahgan Indian campsites and fishtraps can be found along the coast east of the city. Puerto Williams is home to the Martin Gusinde Anthropological Museum, which depicts the lives of both the Yahgan (or Yámana) and Selkʼnam peoples, who were indigenous to Tierra del Fuego. For easy exploration of some of the subantarctic forest, the Omora Ethnobotanical Park is five kilometres down the road to the west.

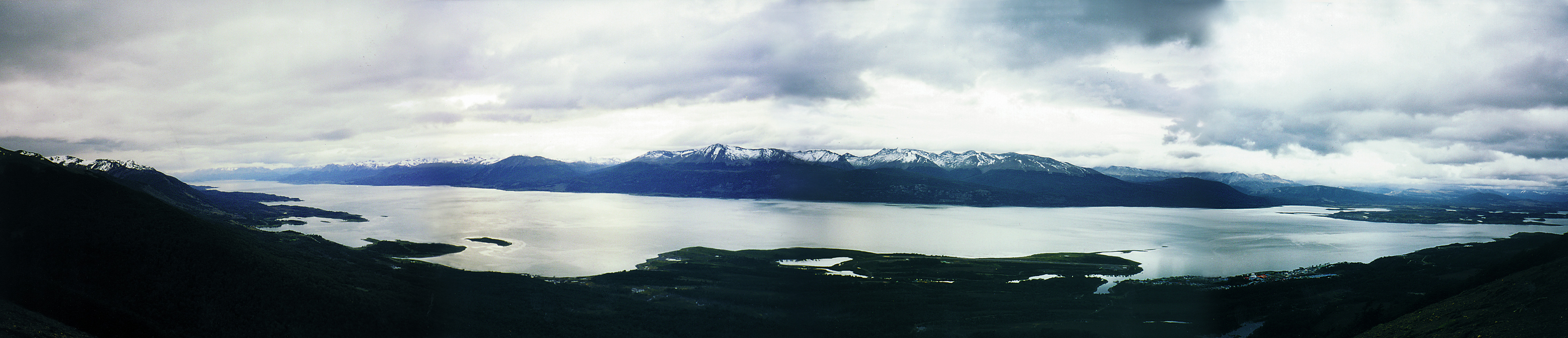
Beagle Channel seen from above Puerto Williams.

== Transport ==
Access is by daily air service from Guardiamarina Zañartu Airport provided by Aerovías DAP or by the weekly vehicle ferry, Yaghan, from Punta Arenas, 350 kilometres (220 mi) to the north. There is no formal public transport service, but an expensive transfer is possible using smaller boats to Ushuaia on the main island of Tierra del Fuego, in Argentina.

== Naval base ==
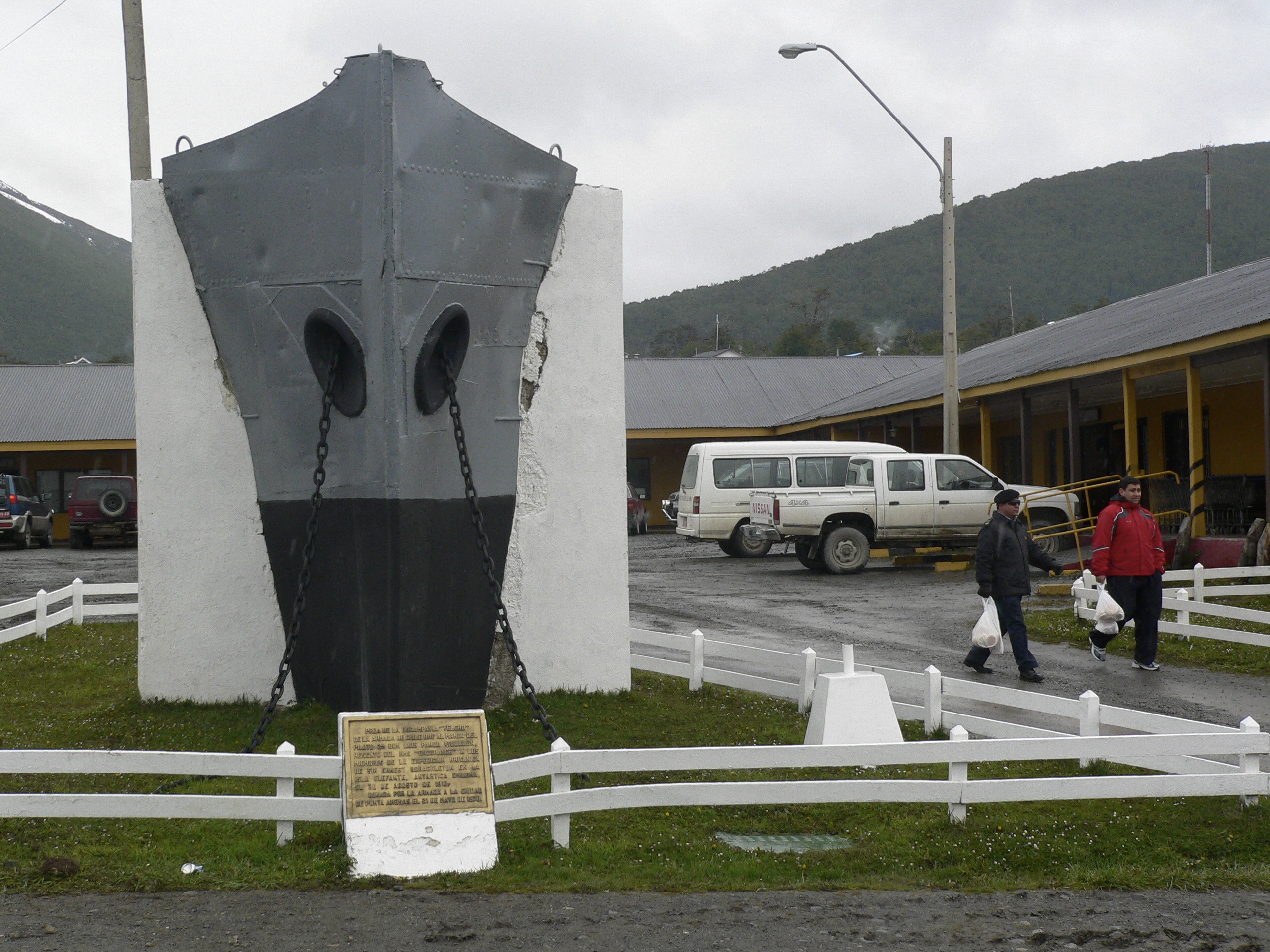
The bow section of the Yelcho, a tug used in 1916 to rescue Shackleton's men marooned on Elephant Island

Puerto Williams is one of the principal naval bases of the Chilean Navy. The base is used as start point for patrol, reconnaissance missions, and rescues in the areas of Beagle Channel, Cape Horn, Drake Passage and the Antarctic Peninsula. The Chilean Navy operates Guardia Marina Zañartu Airport and the Naval Hospital of Puerto Williams in Puerto Williams. Navy personnel make up a considerable portion of the population, although their numbers have decreased in the 21st century.

The following patrol boats and ships are stationed at Puerto Williams:

- PSG Sibbald
- PSG Isaza
- LSG Hallef
- LSG Alacalufe
- PM Puerto Williams

The bow section of the Yelcho, the tug used by Luis Pardo on 30 August 1916 to rescue Ernest Shackleton's men stranded on Elephant Island, has been installed at the front of the Naval headquarters.

== Services and facilities ==
The city has a branch of Banco de Chile, and supports a fire station, and a police station of the Carabineros de Chile. Children are educated at a kindergarten, and primary and secondary schools, and a university center of the University of Magallanes. The Martin Gusinde Anthropological Museum, an airport, seaport, and Micalvi Yacht Club are attractions.

Puerto Williams is served by Radio Navarino.

== Administration ==
Puerto Williams is administered by a municipal council, headed by a mayor who is directly elected every four years. Since 2016 the mayor is Jaime Fernández Alarcón (DC). The communal council has the following members:

- Daniel Fernando Valdebenito Contreras (PS)
- Ángela Barría Barrientos (RN)
- Juan Velásquez (PS)
- Carolina Guenel González (DC)
- Francis Delgado Ibaceta (RN)
- Paola Speake Ojeda (DC)

== Gallery ==
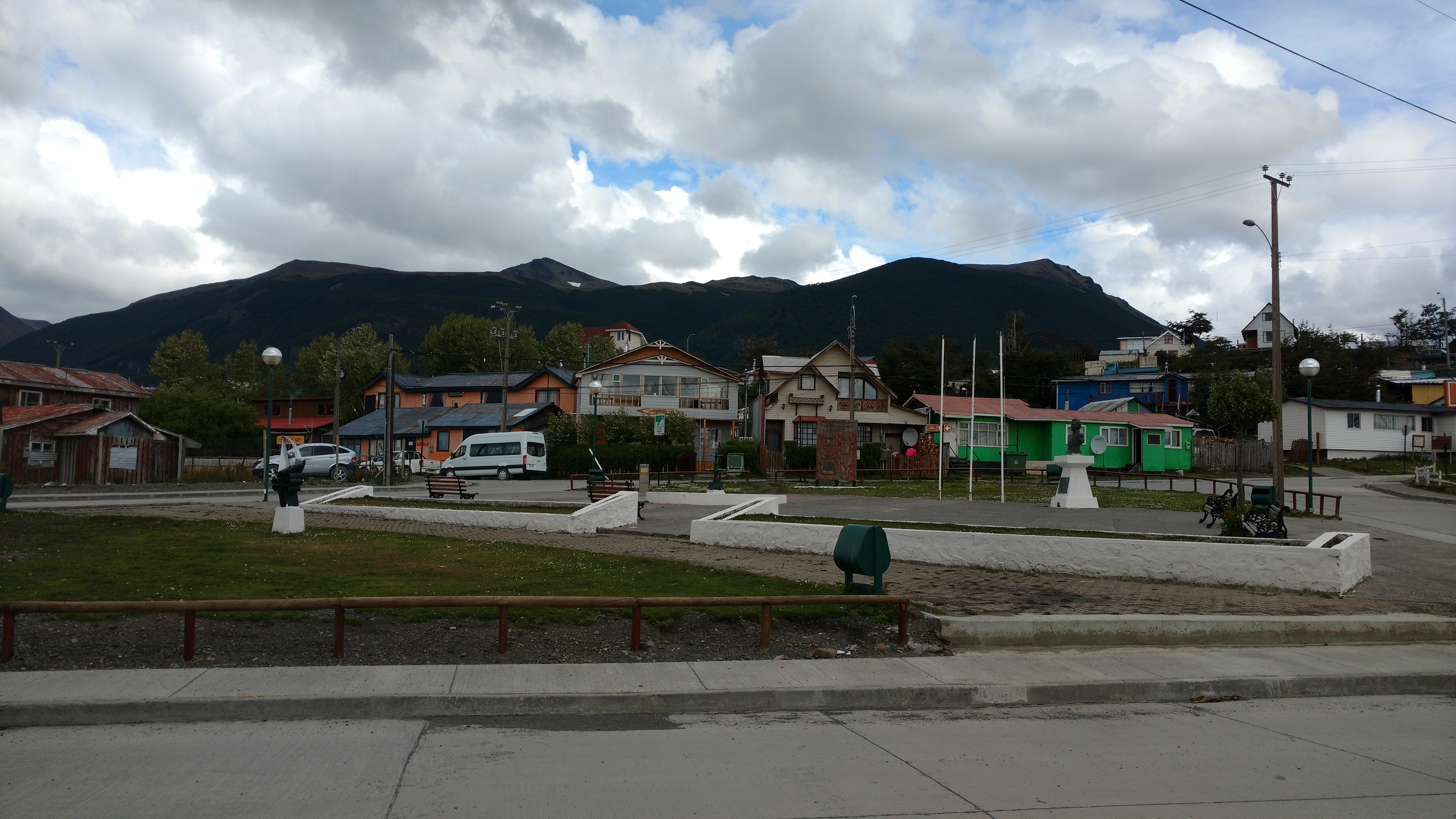
O'Higgins Plaza.

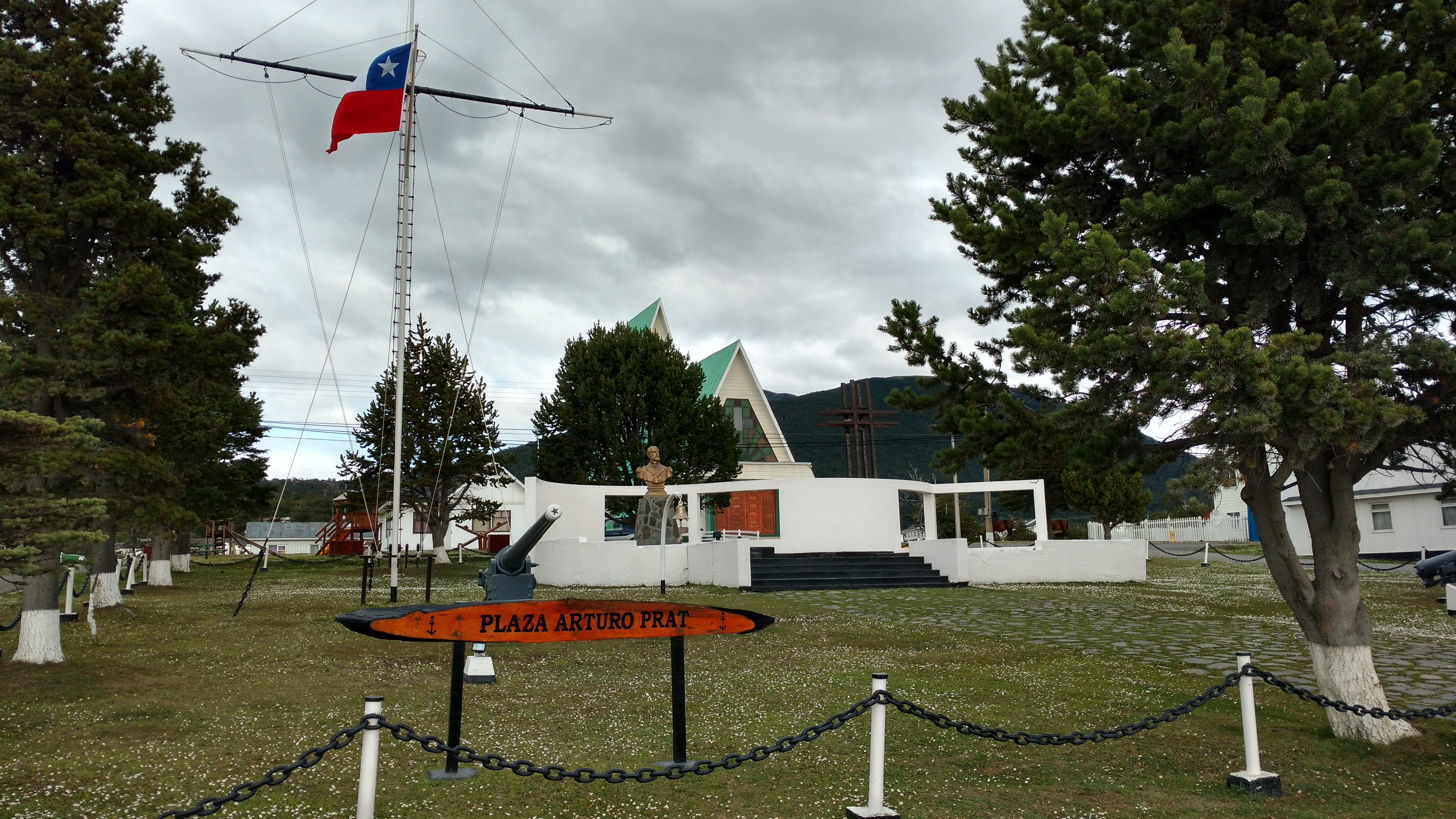
Arturo Prat Plaza.

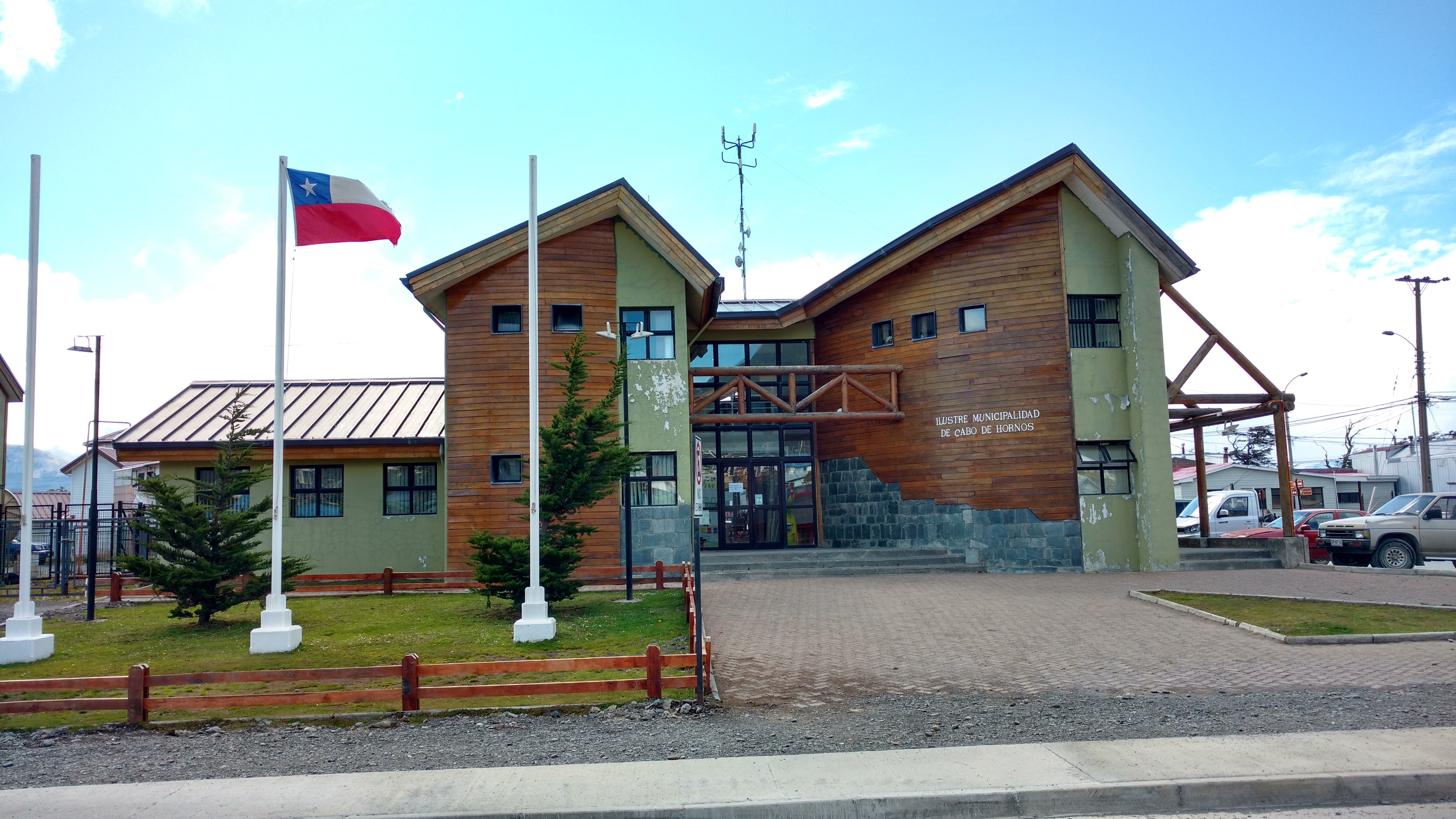
Municipality of Cabo de Hornos.

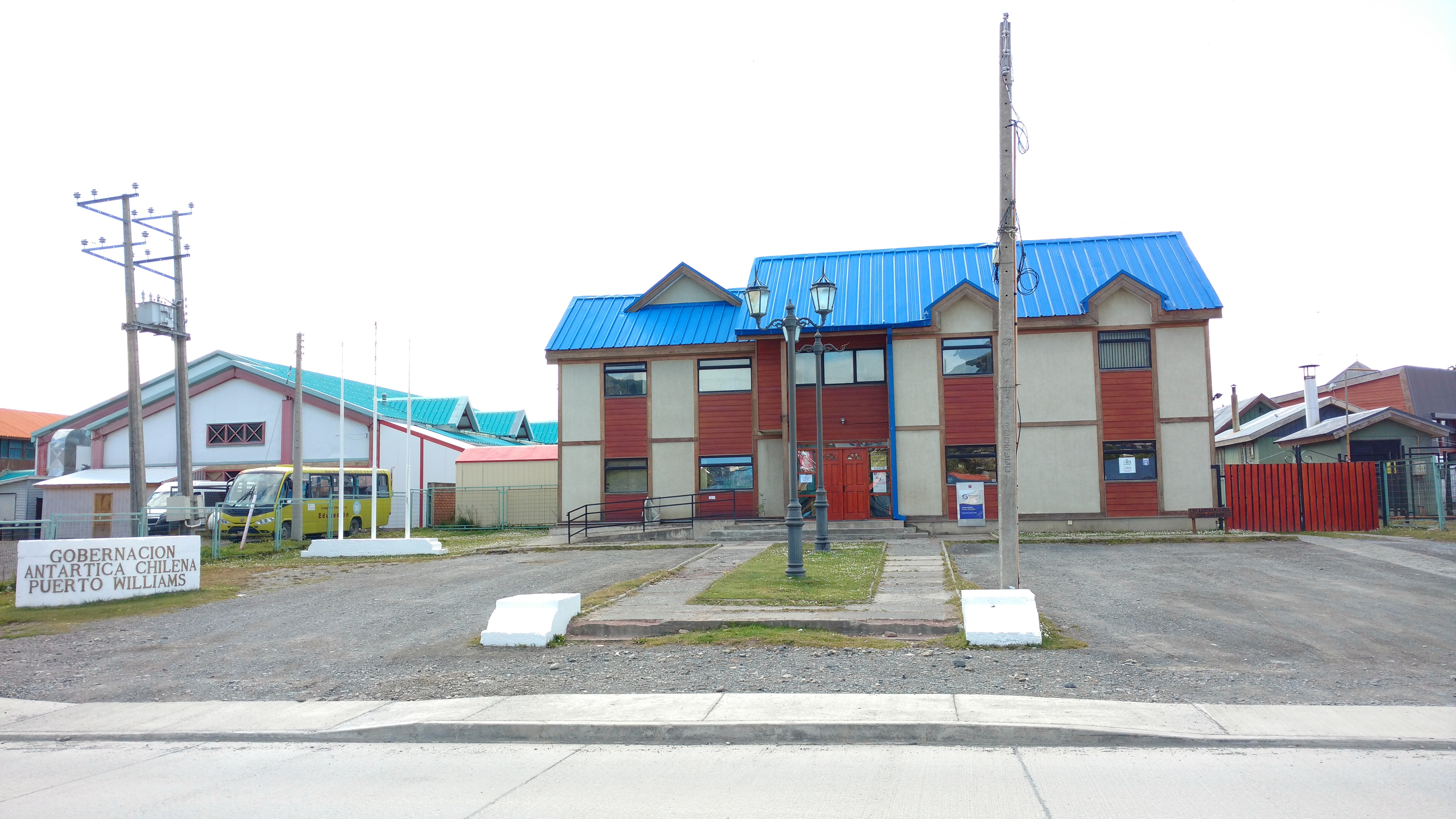
Antártica Chilena Province Governorate in Puerto Williams.

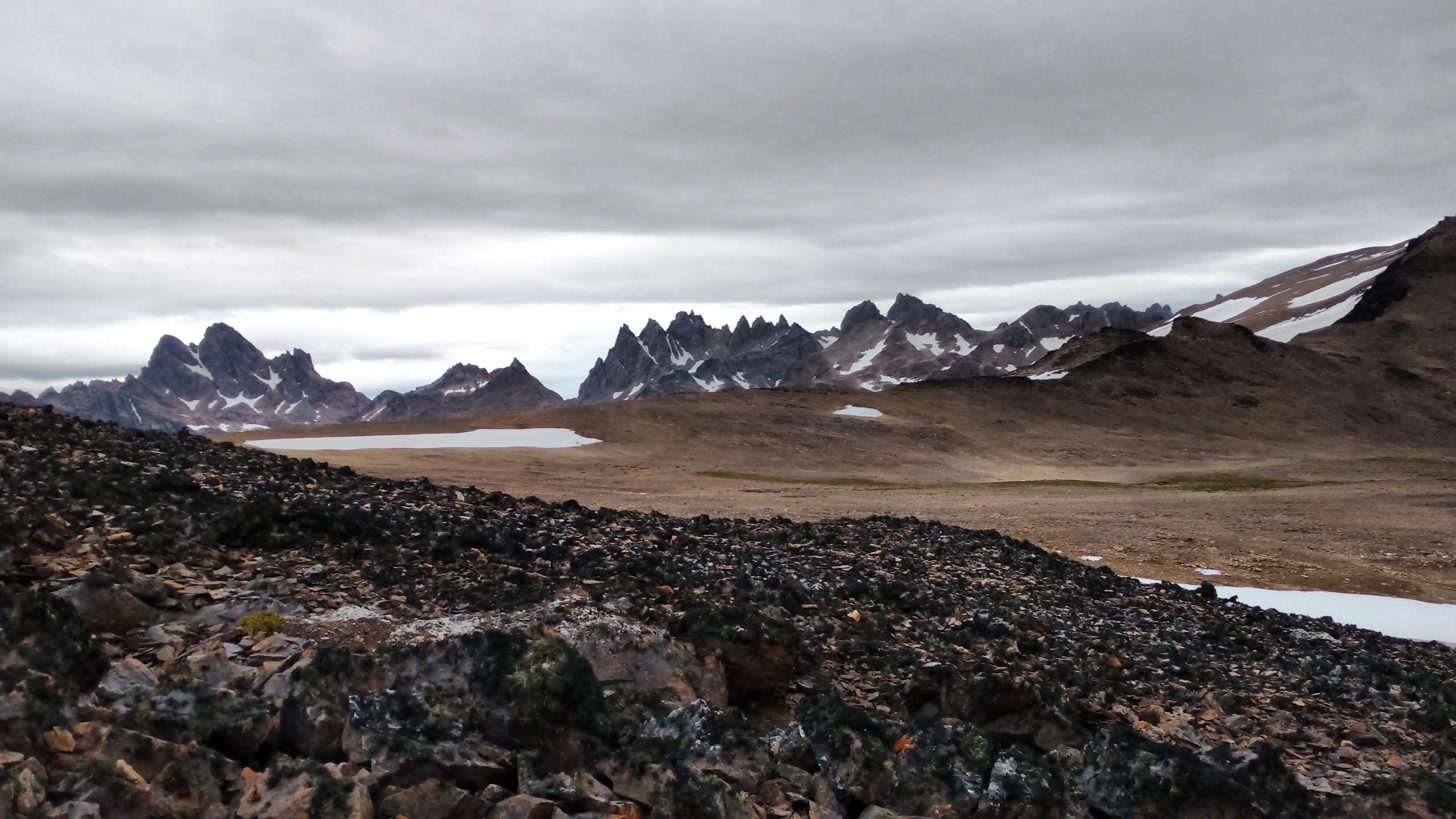
Dientes de Navarino From Cerro Bandera.

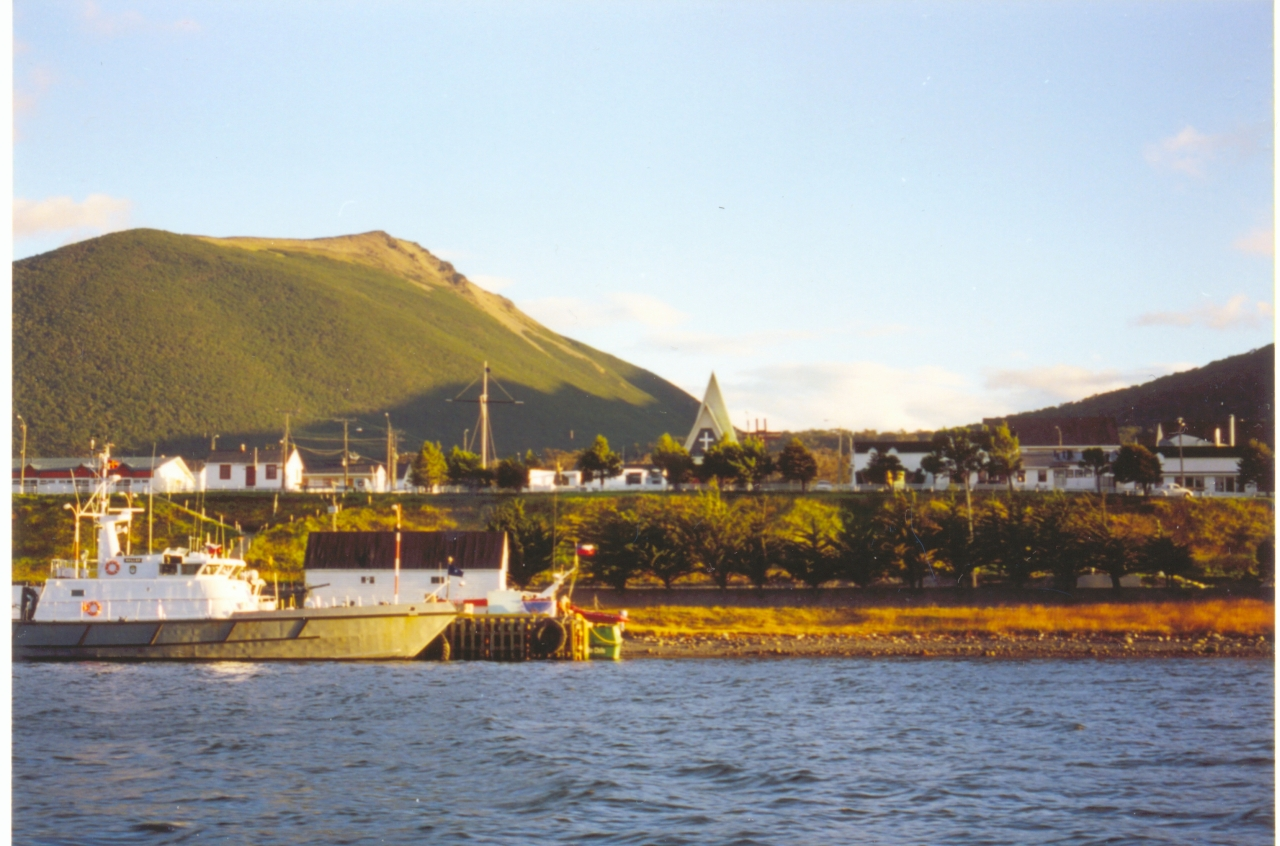
Puerto Williams from the port.

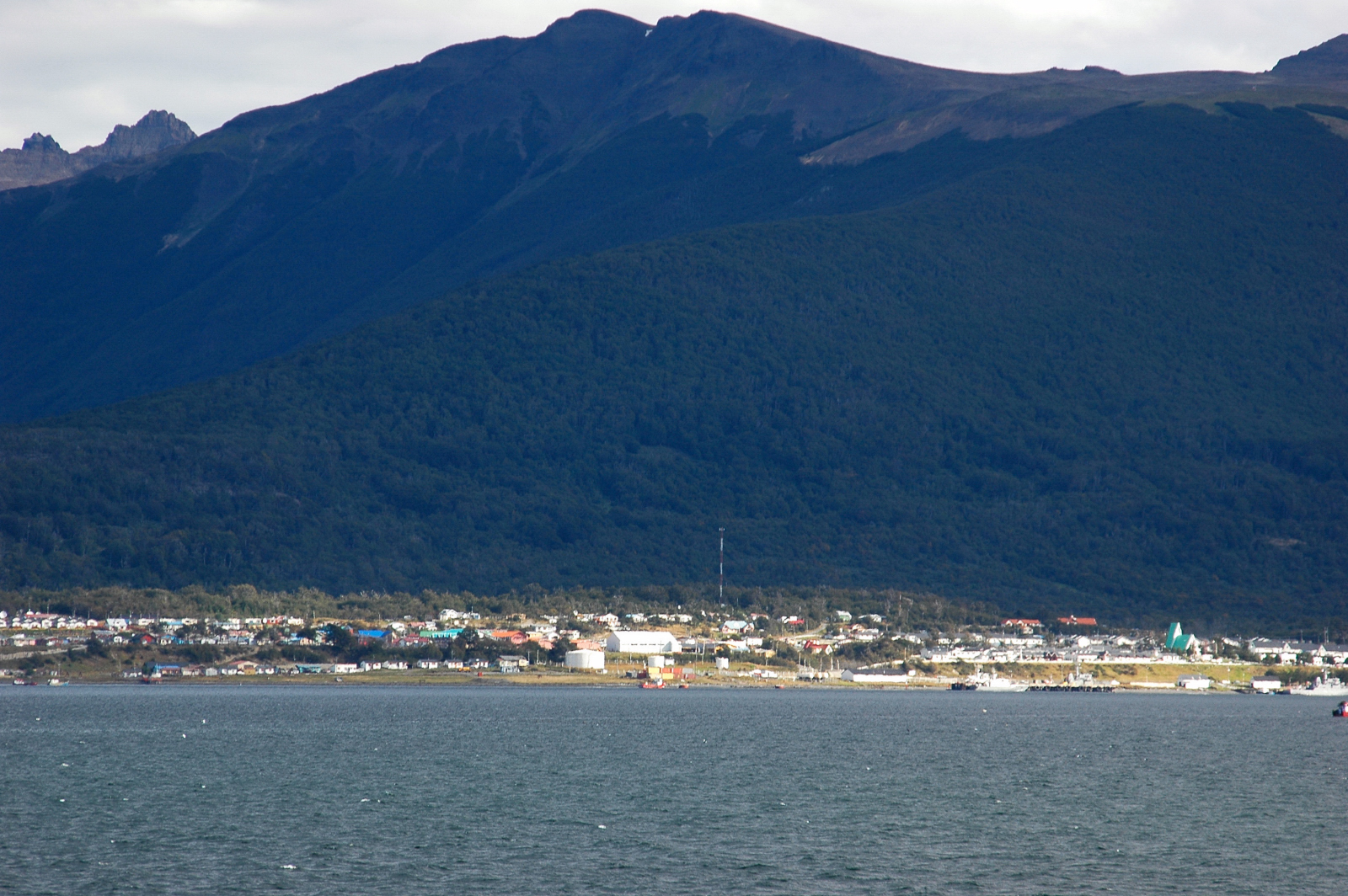
Puerto Williams from the Beagle Channel.

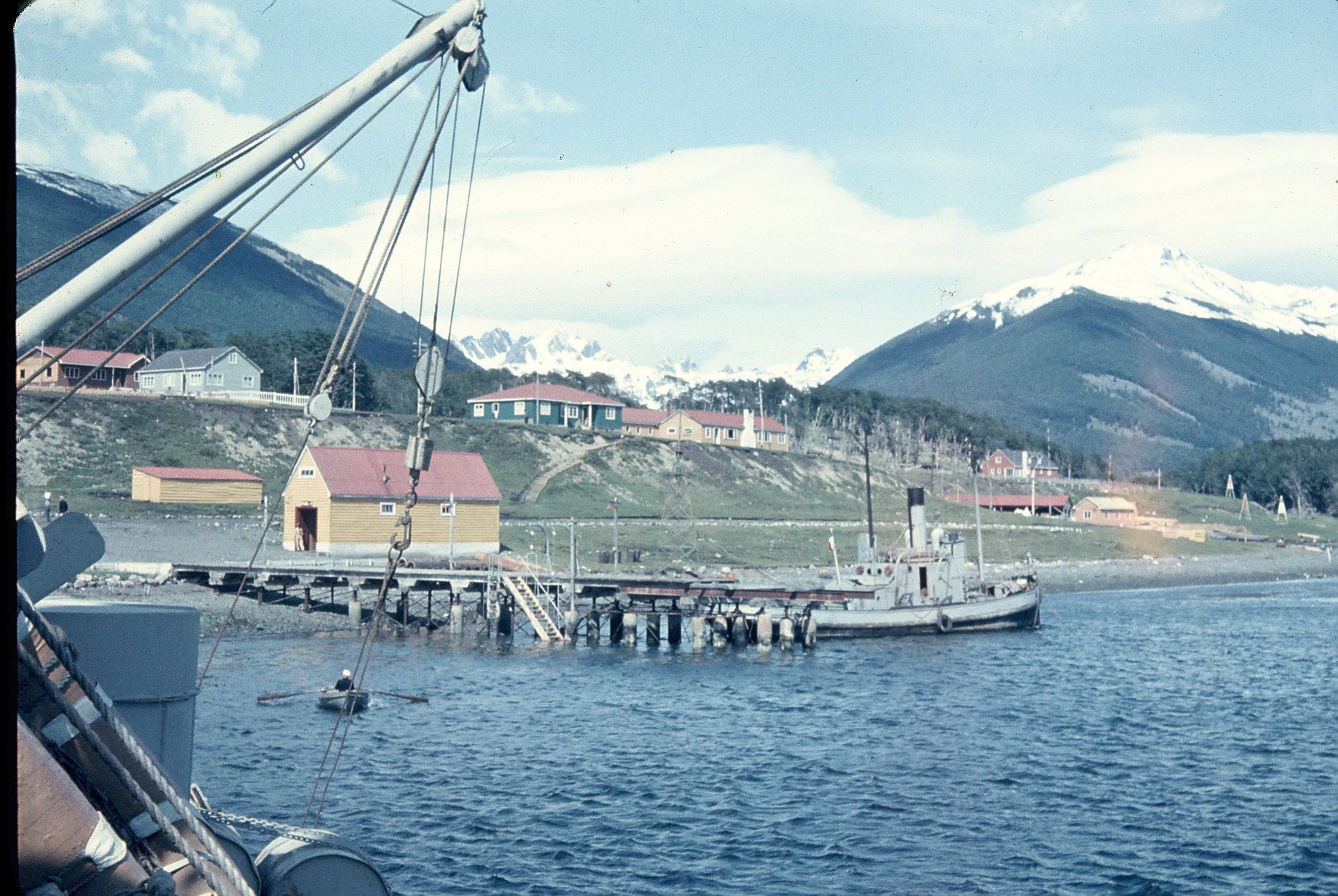
Puerto Williams in 1957.

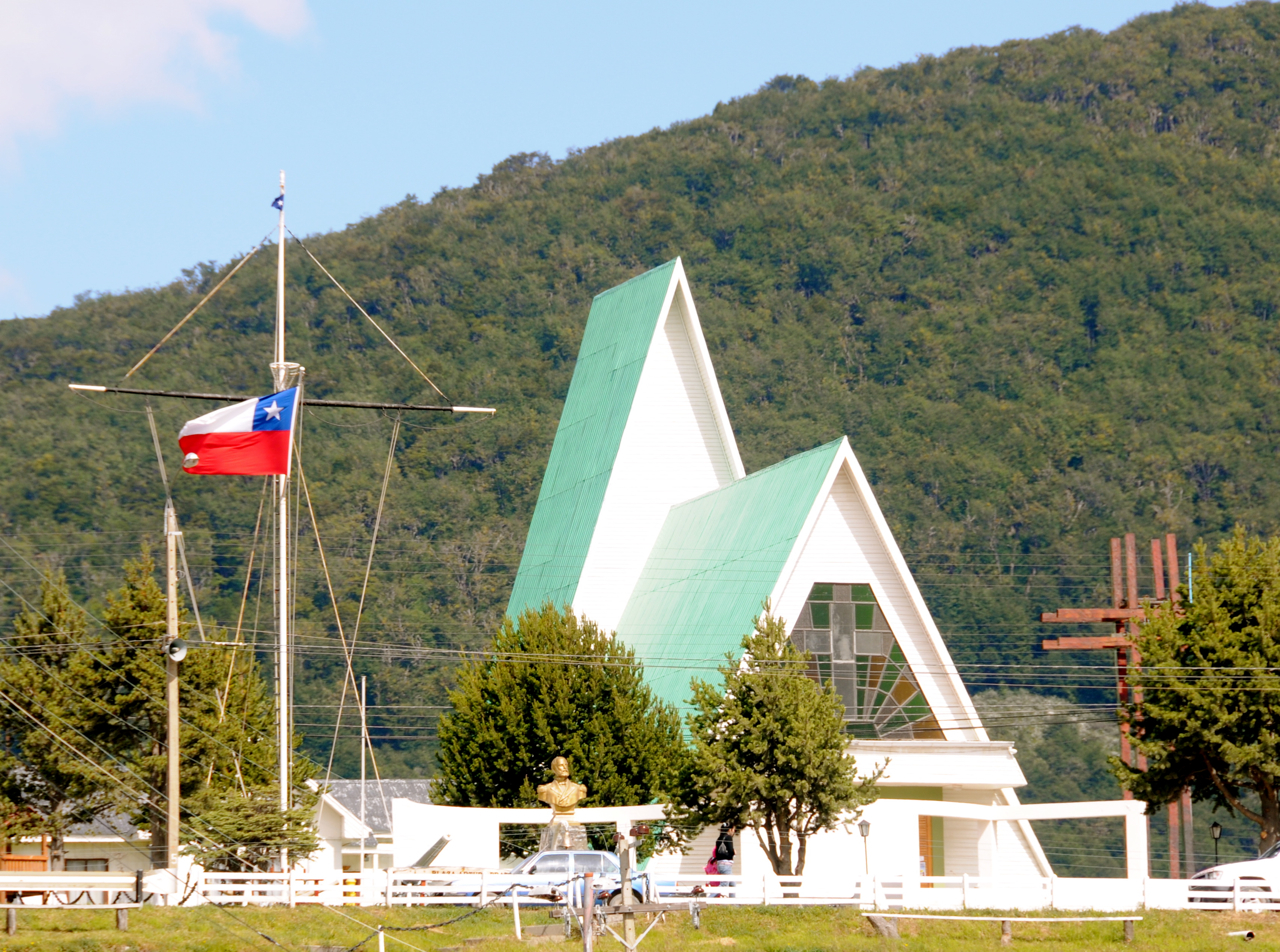
Catholic Church of Puerto Williams.

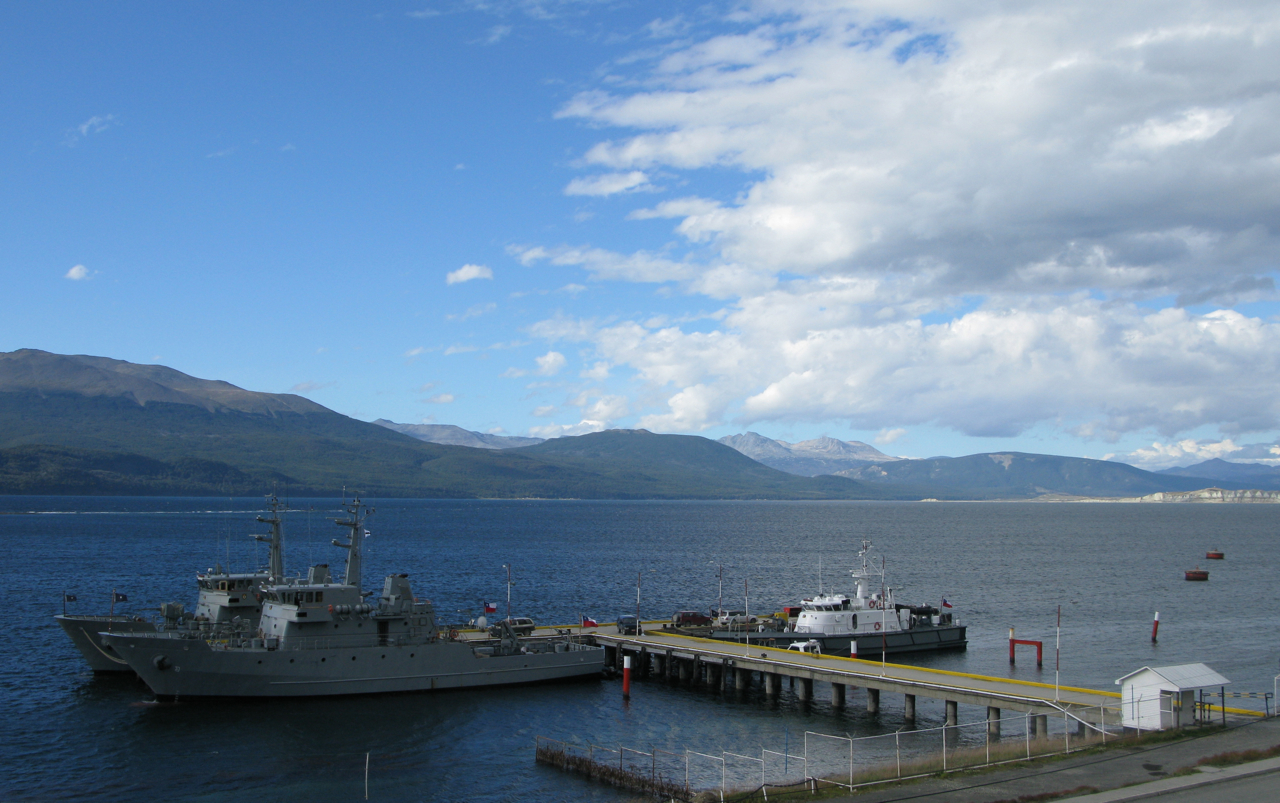
Naval base of Puerto Williams.

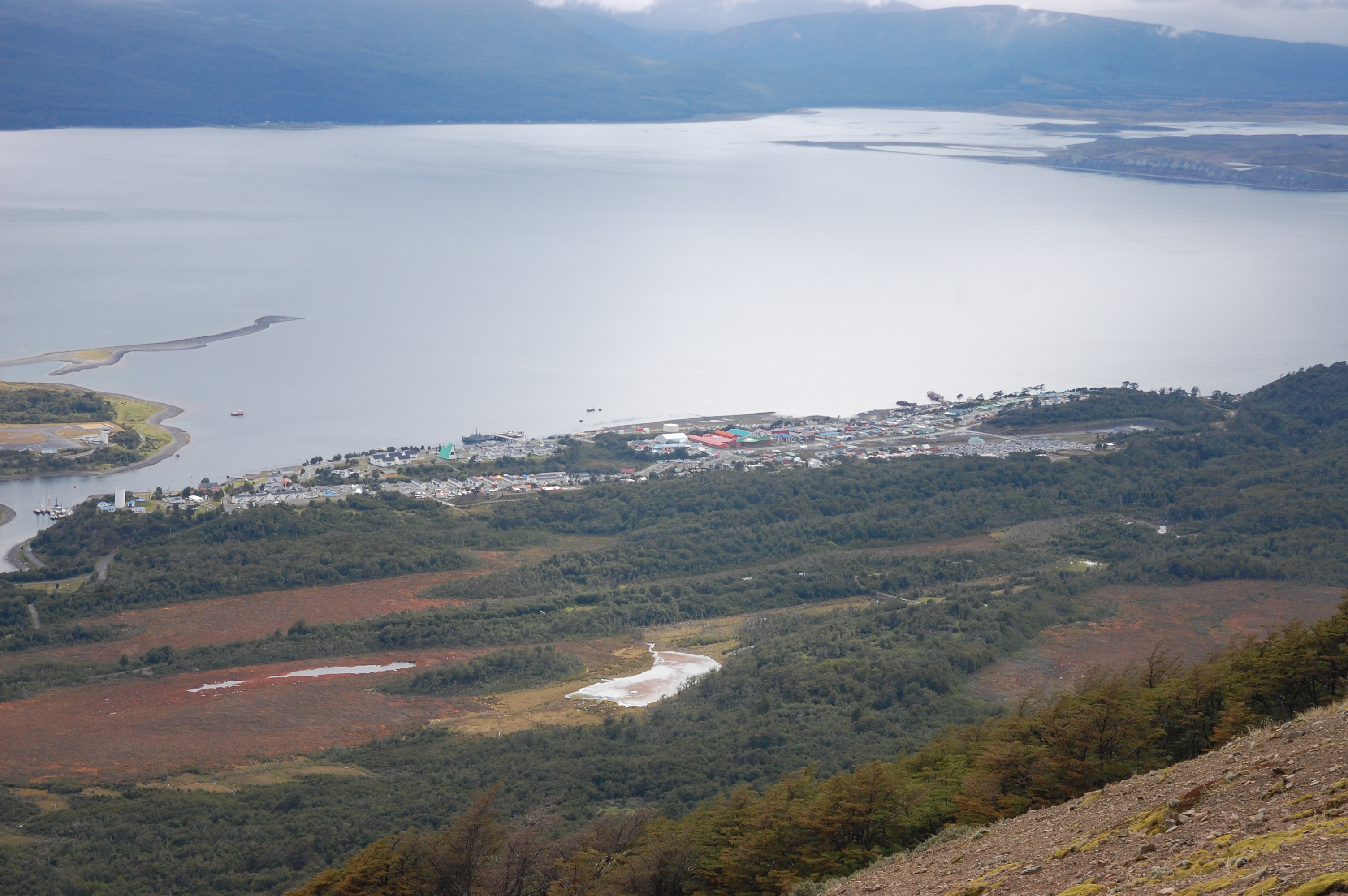
Puerto Williams from Cerro Bandera.

== See also ==
- Bahía Wulaia
- Southernmost settlements
- Beagle conflict
- Alert, Nunavut, the northernmost continuously inhabited place in the world
