= Puerto Toro =

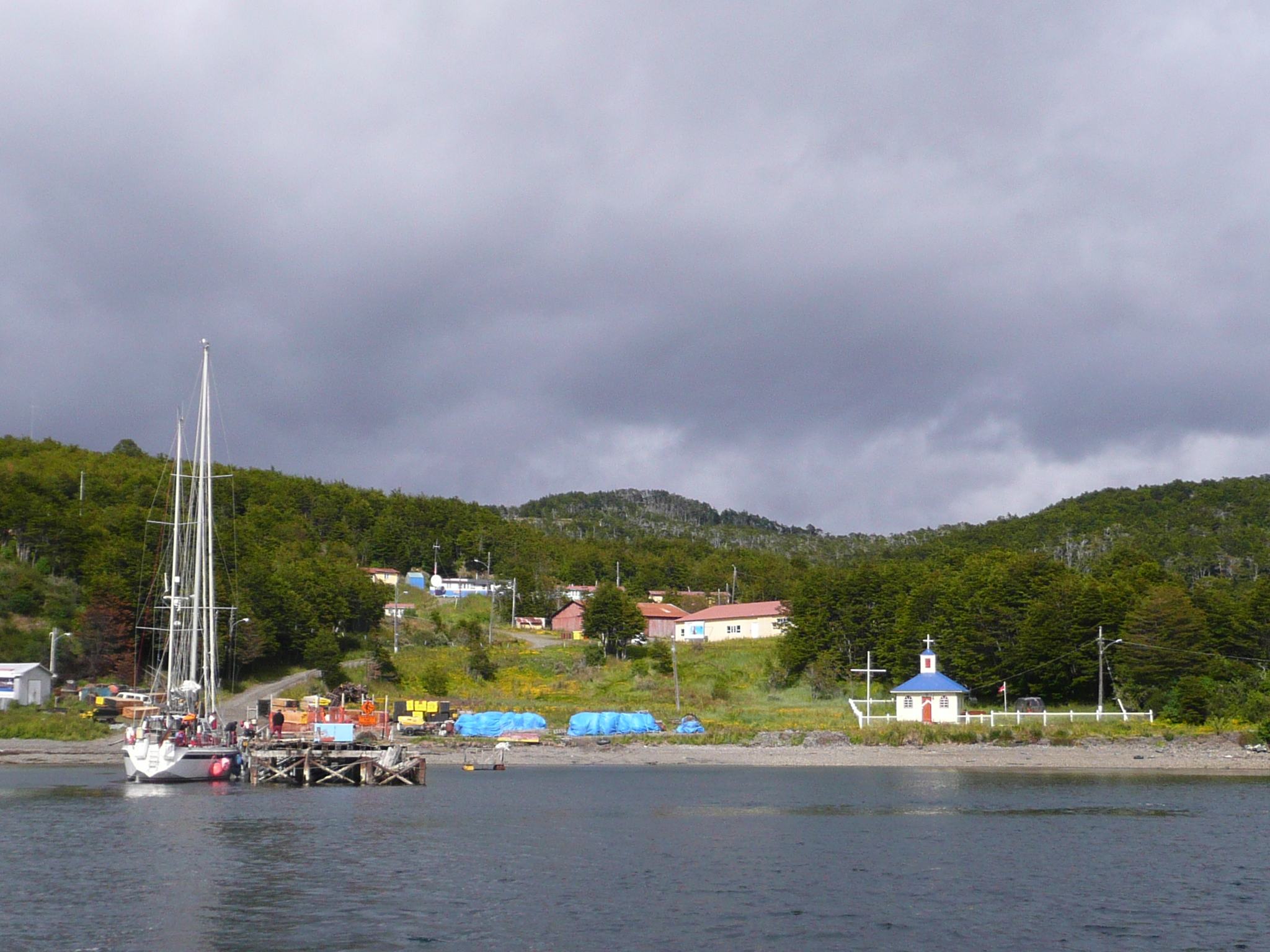

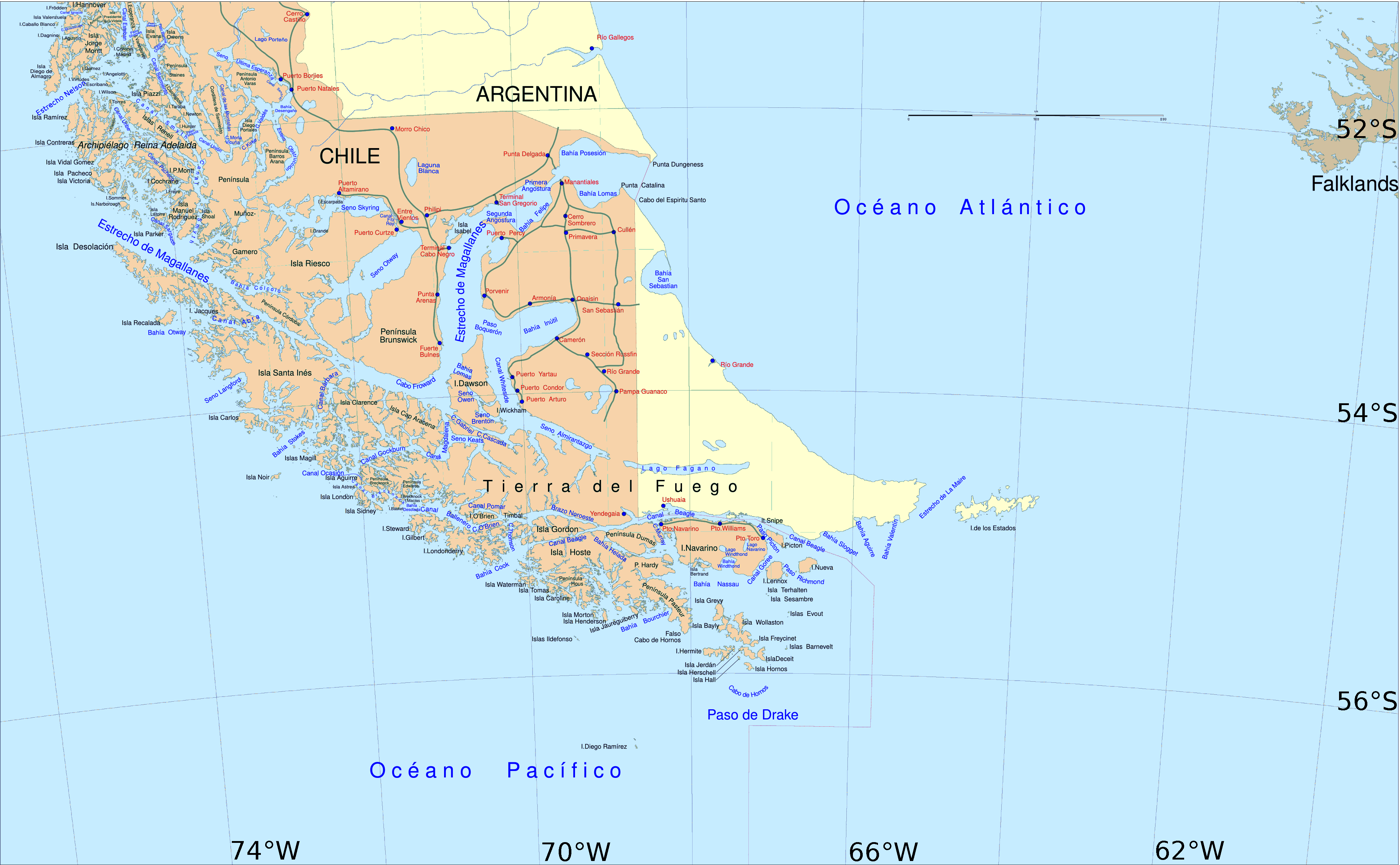
- Puerto Toro at the east coast of Navarino Island

- Location within Southern Patagonia Location within Chile
- Coordinates (town): 55°05′00″S 67°04′30″W
- Country: Chile
- Region: Magallanes y Antártica Chilena
- Province: Antártica Chilena
- Municipalidad: Cabo de Hornos
- Comuna: Cabo de Hornos
- Established: 1892

Government
  - Type: Municipalidad
  - Alcade: Hugo Henriquez Matus

Population (2002 census )
  - Total: 36
- Time zone: UTC−3 (CLST)
- Area code: Country + town = 56 + ?

Puerto Toro is a hamlet on the eastern coast of Navarino Island, Chile. Puerto Toro was founded in 1892 during the Tierra del Fuego Gold Rush by Governor of Punta Arenas Señoret.

It belongs to the Commune of Cabo de Hornos, in Antártica Chilena Province of Magallanes y Antártica Chilena Region. Excluding research stations in Antarctica, Puerto Toro is the southernmost permanently inhabited community on the globe, and some 3,900 km (2425 miles) from the South Pole. It is the only such community on Earth that is situated below the 55th parallel south. Puerto Toro is inhabited by 36 people according to INE's 2002 census, including fishermen and their families. According to the classification of the seas of the International Hydrographic Organization it is the only Chilean locality (and port) with coasts and waters belonging to the Atlantic Ocean, defining as the limit the meridian of Cape Horn (67°16′ W) from Tierra del Fuego to the Antarctic continent.

From the 1880s to the early 1900s, Puerto Toro was one of the most important towns in the region of the Beagle Channel as a result of the Tierra del Fuego gold rush. Once interest in exploring for gold passed, however, Puerto Toro's importance diminished. Today, Puerto Toro is known for "centolla", the prized southern king crab. In relation to tourism, the settlement is part of the End of the World Route, a scenic route that highlights it as a southern point of the country.

== Climate ==
Puerto Toro has a tundra climate (Köppen: ET, Trewartha: Ftkk). However, it still has very mild winters for a tundra climate.

Climate data for Puerto Toro
Month	Jan	Feb	Mar	Apr	May	Jun	Jul	Aug	Sep	Oct	Nov	Dec	Year
Mean daily maximum °C (°F)	13.8 (56.8)	13.6 (56.5)	12.6 (54.7)	10.1 (50.2)	7.1 (44.8)	5.5 (41.9)	4.9 (40.8)	5.1 (41.2)	7.6 (45.7)	10.1 (50.2)	11.5 (52.7)	13.6 (56.5)	9.6 (49.3)
Daily mean °C (°F)	9.3 (48.7)	9.0 (48.2)	8.2 (46.8)	5.9 (42.6)	3.5 (38.3)	2.2 (36.0)	1.8 (35.2)	1.7 (35.1)	3.8 (38.8)	5.8 (42.4)	7.1 (44.8)	9.3 (48.7)	5.6 (42.1)
Mean daily minimum °C (°F)	4.9 (40.8)	4.4 (39.9)	3.8 (38.8)	1.8 (35.2)	0 (32)	−0.9 (30.4)	−1.2 (29.8)	−1.6 (29.1)	0 (32)	1.6 (34.9)	2.7 (36.9)	5.1 (41.2)	1.7 (35.1)
Average rainfall mm (inches)	48 (1.9)	46 (1.8)	47 (1.9)	50 (2.0)	43 (1.7)	37 (1.5)	34 (1.3)	40 (1.6)	30 (1.2)	29 (1.1)	38 (1.5)	45 (1.8)	487 (19.2)
Source: Climate-Data.org

== See also ==
- Ushuaia
- Puerto Williams
- Villa Las Estrellas
- Southernmost settlements
