= Puerto Navarino =

- Location within Southern Patagonia
- Coordinates: 54°55′32″S 68°19′26″W
- Region: Magallanes
- Province: Antártica Chilena
- Municipalidad: Cabo de Hornos
- Comuna: Cabo de Hornos

Government
  - Type: Municipalidad
  - Alcade: Hugo Henriquez Matus
- Time zone: UTC−3 (CLST)
- Area code: Country + town = 56 + ?

Puerto Navarino is a Chilean port on the Beagle Channel in western Navarino Island opposite Ushuaia in Argentina. Puerto Navarino is part of Cabo de Hornos commune. It is 54km west of Puerto Williams along a gravel road. It is one of the most southerly populated places in Chile.
