= Murray Channel =

Channel in the commune of Cabo de Hornos, Magallanes Region, Chile

Coordinates: 54°58′S 68°22′W

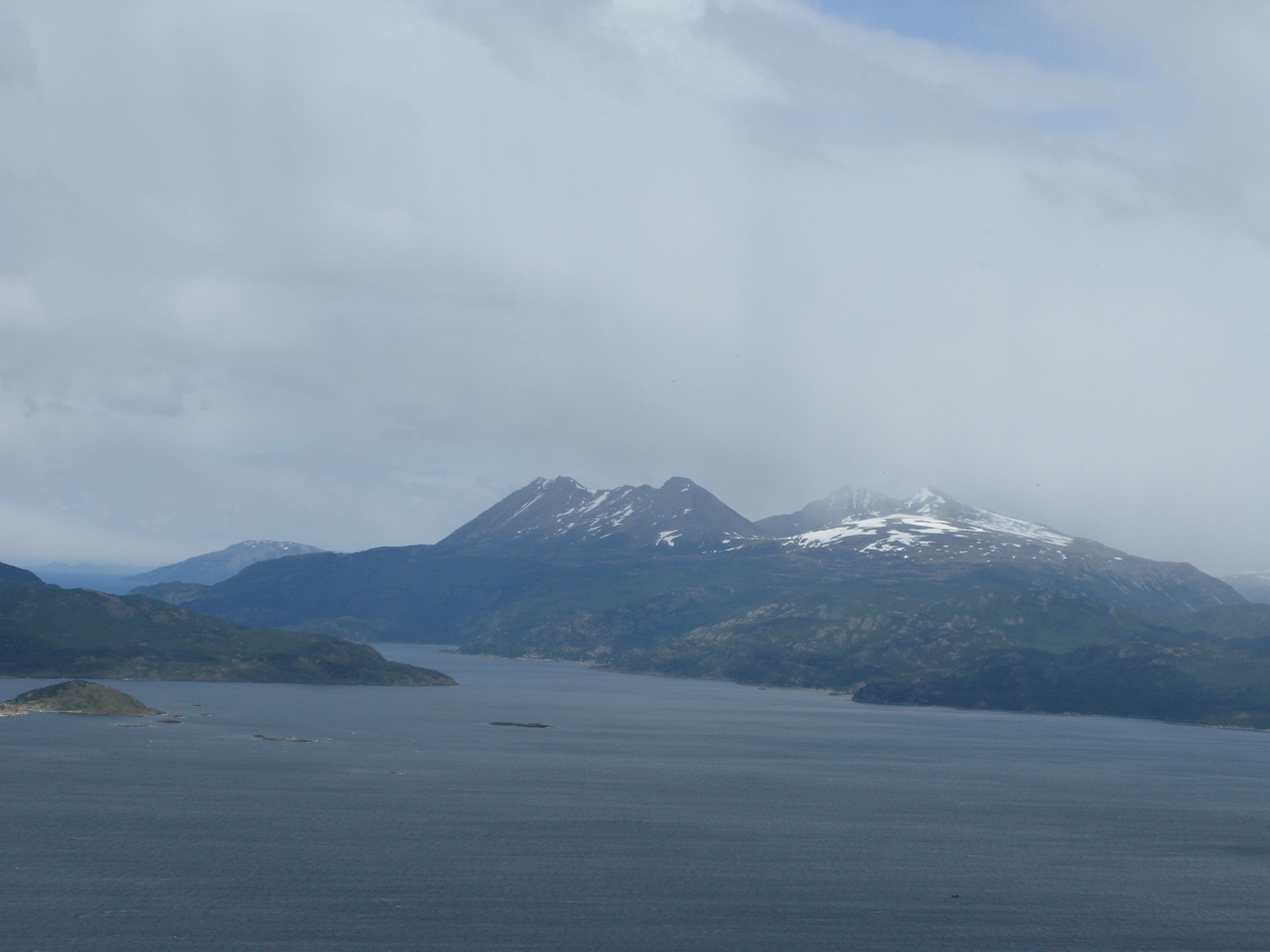
Murray Channel in the distance.

Murray Channel at the east side of the Hoste island.

The Murray Channel is a channel of Chile located in the Commune of Cabo de Hornos, in the Antártica Chilena Province of the Magallanes y la Antártica Chilena Region. It separates Hoste Island from Navarino Island and is bounded by the Beagle Channel to the north. The salinity of the Murray Channel is approximately 31.8 parts per thousand.

== Prehistory ==
The Yaghan peoples settled the lands along the Murray Channel approximately 10,000 years ago. There are notable archaeological sites indicating such early Yaghan settlement, such as Bahia Wulaia on Isla Navarino, where the Bahia Wulaia Dome Middens are located.
