= Cerro Bandera =

- Location within Chile

Highest point
- Elevation: 610 m (2,000 ft)
- Coordinates: 54°57′46″S 67°38′07″W

Naming
- English translation: Flag Hill
- Language of name: Spanish

Geography
- Location: Navarino Island, Region of Magallanes and Chilean Antarctic, Chile

Geology
- Mountain type: Hill

Climbing
- Access: Puerto Williams

The Cerro Bandera is a hill located on Navarino Island, is visible from Puerto Williams and its top is a flag of Chile, takes about 3 hours to travel back and forth. It is also the first stop to continue the circuit Dientes de Navarino.

== See also ==
- Puerto Williams
