= Navarino Island =

Island in southern Chile

Native name: Isla Navarino or Shunuko (Yamana)
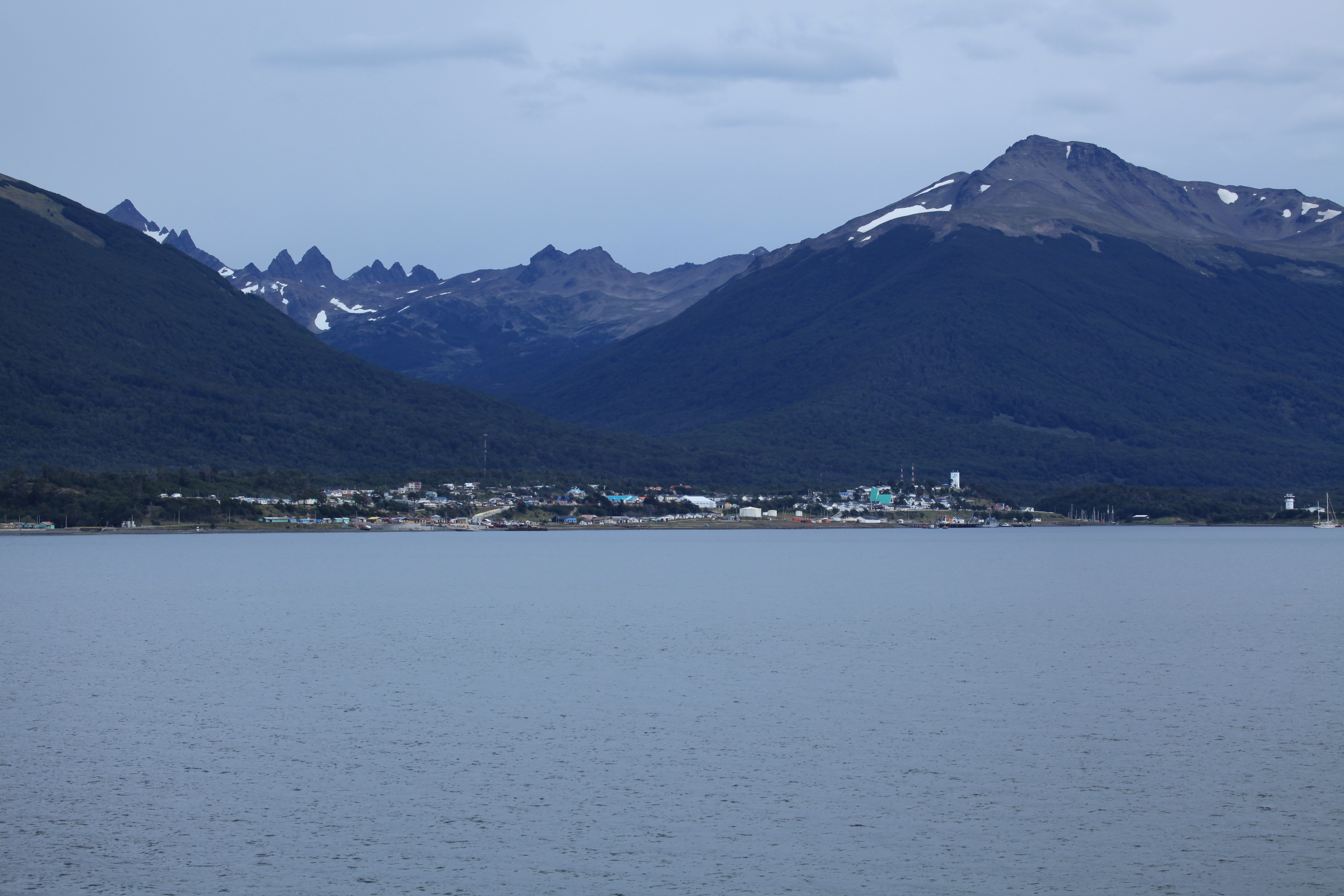
- Puerto Williams with Dientes de Navarino in the background

- Location within Southern Patagonia

Geography
- Coordinates: 55°05′03.46″S 67°38′33.83″W
- Adjacent to: Pacific ocean - Atlantic ocean
- Area: 2,514 km^{2} (971 sq mi)
- Coastline: 510 km (317 mi)
- Highest elevation: 1,195 m (3921 ft)
- Highest point: Dientes de Navarino

Administration
- Chile
- Region: Magallanes
- Province: Antártica Chilena
- Commune: Cabo de Hornos, Chile

Demographics
- Population: ~2,000

Additional information
- NGA UFI=-893346

Detail map with Navarino Island

Navarino Island (Spanish: Isla Navarino) is a large Chilean island, with an area of 2,514 km^{2} (971 sq mi) and a coastline of 510 km (320 mi). It is located between Isla Grande de Tierra del Fuego, to the north, and Cape Horn, to the south. The island forms part of the Commune of Cabo de Hornos, the southernmost commune in Chile and in the world, belonging to Antártica Chilena Province in the XII Region of Magallanes and Chilean Antarctica. Its population is concentrated primarily in the communal capital, Puerto Williams, and in small settlements like Puerto Navarino, Río Guanaco and Puerto Toro. The highest point of the island is Pico Navarino at 1,195 m (3,921 ft). The island is a popular destination for fly-fishers.

== Archaeology ==
History and archaeology may be the most valuable resource of Navarino Island and its adjacent sectors. It is considered to have dense concentrations of Yahgan archeological sites in the world. The Yahgan were nomadic people, known for building temporary settlements on a seasonal basis. Their middens show dependency on fishing for food, and on a range of vegetables they gathered.

There is a Megalithic Yaghan archaeological site dating to about 10,000 years ago near Wulaia Bay. Numerous remains of huts surrounded by ring middens have been found on the lowland terraces.

=== Tourism ===
Interest in the Yahgan culture attracts tourists. At the regional museum, the Martin Gusinde Anthropological Museum, exhibits the Yaghan culture: their dwellings, fish traps, and crafts; and the remains of the 19th-century English missions can be seen. Aquatic birds, and the geology and botany of the island, also attract tourists.

== History ==
=== Beagle Conflict ===
The countries disagreed about the sovereign rights over the zone and Snipe, an uninhabitable islet between Picton Island and Navarino Island, claimed by both. Chileans call the waterway around the islet Beagle Channel, but in Argentina they called it Moat channel on the grounds that the Beagle Channel, allegedly, went south around Navarino Island.

The waters around Navarino Island were the location of the Snipe incident between Chile and Argentina in 1958. It was the result of a disputed border line in the Beagle Channel.

In 1971, both countries agreed to British led arbitration to be followed, if necessary, with a binding decision by a panel of five international judges under British auspicices. Arbitration proved unsuccessful and in 1977 judges ruled that the islands belong to Chile. However, in 1978 Argentina rejected the decision and began preparing for military action, Operation Soberanía, bringing the countries to the brink of war. In 1984, after the Argentine defeat in the Falklands war with Britain, and following a national referendum, a new democratic Argentine government signed a treaty with Chile accepting the islands belonged to Chile.

== Etymology ==
Jacques l'Hermite's fleet were the first Europeans to disembark at the Navarino Island, in 1624. They recorded the native name of the island as Wulla. HMS Beagle visited the island under the command of Phillip Parker King and Robert FitzRoy as part of a survey started in 1829. They named the island after then-recent Battle of Navarino (1827) which was a turning point of the Greek War of Independence against the Ottoman Empire.

== Features ==
The coast of Navarino Island offers opportunities for sea kayaking among small barren islands and channels surrounded by native vegetation and populated by a rich variety of birds.

There is fishing in the Murray Channel. Boat trips can also be taken to visit the glaciers of the northwest arm of the Beagle Channel (located in the Alberto de Agostini National Park), and towards Cape Horn and Chilean Antarctica.

There is a hiking circuit around the jagged pinnacles known as the Dientes de Navarino. The trail passes peaks known as Cerro Clem and Montes Lindenmayer, named in 2001 by the Chilean Ministry of Natural Resources for the author of the Lonely Planet guide. There are also areas for rock climbing.

Several ranches have been established on the island. The northern section of the island is suitable for horseback riding.

Salmon trout are found in abundance in Navarino Lake, and on the north coast of the island, the sea enters deep coves suitable for fishing snook.

== Climate ==
The island has a polar tundra climate (Köppen: ET). On the northern coastal strip, where Puerto Williams is located, the annual average precipitation is 467 mm (18 in), with an average temperature of 6 °C (43 °F). The average temperature in the warmest month is 9.6 °C (49.3 °F), and in the coldest month 1.9 °C (35.4 °F). Further south, annual precipitation increases to about 800 mm (31 in), with a slight diminution in temperatures. Precipitation is distributed more or less uniformly across the year, and some falls as snow. In the extensive southernmost part of the island, including Lakes Navarino and Windhond, there is an increase in precipitation, a diminution of summer temperatures, and an increase in the winter temperatures through wind drift.

=== Climate data ===
Climate data for Puerto Williams (1991–2020, extremes 1968–present)
Month	Jan	Feb	Mar	Apr	May	Jun	Jul	Aug	Sep	Oct	Nov	Dec	Year
Record high °C (°F)	25.2 (77.4)	26.1 (79.0)	24.0 (75.2)	22.2 (72.0)	17.5 (63.5)	18.0 (64.4)	15.9 (60.6)	14.8 (58.6)	18.6 (65.5)	22.8 (73.0)	24.2 (75.6)	26.0 (78.8)	26.1 (79.0)
Mean daily maximum °C (°F)	15.4 (59.7)	14.7 (58.5)	14.8 (58.6)	11.4 (52.5)	8.5 (47.3)	5.5 (41.9)	5.7 (42.3)	7.5 (45.5)	9.7 (49.5)	11.4 (52.5)	12.9 (55.2)	14.4 (57.9)	11.0 (51.8)
Daily mean °C (°F)	9.9 (49.8)	9.6 (49.3)	8.4 (47.1)	6.2 (43.2)	4.1 (39.4)	1.9 (35.4)	1.9 (35.4)	2.9 (37.2)	4.3 (39.7)	6.1 (43.0)	7.7 (45.9)	8.7 (47.7)	6.0 (42.8)
Mean daily minimum °C (°F)	5.2 (41.4)	5.0 (41.0)	3.9 (39.0)	1.7 (35.1)	−0.6 (30.9)	−1.6 (29.1)	−2.0 (28.4)	−0.8 (30.6)	−0.2 (31.6)	1.4 (34.5)	2.3 (36.1)	4.2 (39.6)	1.5 (34.7)
Record low °C (°F)	−2.6 (27.3)	−3.0 (26.6)	−5.1 (22.8)	−5.8 (21.6)	−6.4 (20.5)	−12.6 (9.3)	−10.5 (13.1)	−8.6 (16.5)	−9.8 (14.4)	−5.0 (23.0)	−6.4 (20.5)	−2.0 (28.4)	−12.6 (9.3)
Average precipitation mm (inches)	52.0 (2.05)	53.2 (2.09)	48.1 (1.89)	40.0 (1.57)	37.8 (1.49)	45.3 (1.78)	33.7 (1.33)	36.0 (1.42)	32.1 (1.26)	30.1 (1.19)	40.2 (1.58)	48.1 (1.89)	496.6 (19.55)
Average precipitation days (≥ 1.0 mm)	10.6	9.4	8.2	7.3	6.9	7.6	7.0	6.2	6.3	6.9	8.2	9.9	94.5
Source 1: Dirección Meteorológica de Chile
Source 2: NOAA (precipitation days 1991–2020)

Climate data for Navarino Island
Month	Jan	Feb	Mar	Apr	May	Jun	Jul	Aug	Sep	Oct	Nov	Dec	Year
Mean daily maximum °C (°F)	12.3 (54.1)	12.4 (54.3)	11.7 (53.1)	9.1 (48.4)	6.9 (44.4)	5.0 (41.0)	5.0 (41.0)	5.1 (41.2)	7.5 (45.5)	9.8 (49.6)	10.5 (50.9)	11.8 (53.2)	9.0 (48.2)
Daily mean °C (°F)	9.8 (49.6)	9.3 (48.7)	8.4 (47.1)	6.1 (43.0)	3.8 (38.8)	2.6 (36.7)	2.2 (36.0)	1.8 (35.2)	3.9 (39.0)	6.2 (43.2)	7.2 (45.0)	9.6 (49.3)	5.9 (42.6)
Mean daily minimum °C (°F)	5.2 (41.4)	6.0 (42.8)	4.6 (40.3)	2.9 (37.2)	1.0 (33.8)	−0.5 (31.1)	0.0 (32.0)	−0.3 (31.5)	1.0 (33.8)	2.9 (37.2)	4.1 (39.4)	5.0 (41.0)	2.7 (36.9)
Average precipitation mm (inches)	51.9 (2.04)	44.1 (1.74)	40.8 (1.61)	38.3 (1.51)	44.3 (1.74)	26.6 (1.05)	34.8 (1.37)	42.8 (1.69)	26.2 (1.03)	25.7 (1.01)	33.6 (1.32)	38.7 (1.52)	450.8 (17.75)
Average relative humidity (%)	79	85	81	81	83	84	87	91	86	84	83	84	84
Source: Bioclimatografia de Chile

Climate data for Rio Douglas
Month	Jan	Feb	Mar	Apr	May	Jun	Jul	Aug	Sep	Oct	Nov	Dec	Year
Mean daily maximum °C (°F)	13.2 (55.8)	13.7 (56.7)	12.9 (55.2)	8.9 (48.0)	6.7 (44.1)	3.6 (38.5)	4.2 (39.6)	6.0 (42.8)	7.5 (45.5)	10.4 (50.7)	10.4 (50.7)	12.5 (54.5)	9.2 (48.5)
Daily mean °C (°F)	8.9 (48.0)	9.4 (48.9)	9.0 (48.2)	5.5 (41.9)	3.6 (38.5)	0.8 (33.4)	1.5 (34.7)	2.5 (36.5)	3.8 (38.8)	6.1 (43.0)	6.5 (43.7)	8.3 (46.9)	5.5 (41.9)
Mean daily minimum °C (°F)	4.7 (40.5)	5.0 (41.0)	4.3 (39.7)	1.6 (34.9)	−0.1 (31.8)	−2.5 (27.5)	−1.6 (29.1)	−1.2 (29.8)	−0.2 (31.6)	1.5 (34.7)	2.3 (36.1)	3.9 (39.0)	1.5 (34.6)
Average precipitation mm (inches)	95.1 (3.74)	60.1 (2.37)	85.2 (3.35)	85.0 (3.35)	98.2 (3.87)	83.8 (3.30)	99.3 (3.91)	57.8 (2.28)	40.6 (1.60)	49.3 (1.94)	113.7 (4.48)	63.2 (2.49)	931.3 (36.68)
Source: Bioclimatografia de Chile

== Flora ==
In the North end of the island the vegetation is characterized by the deciduous Magellanic forest, whose characteristic species are Lenga Beech (Nothofagus pumilio), with Ñirre Beech (Nothofagus antarctica) in the driest areas, Coihue of Magallanes (Nothofagus betuloides) in the wettest areas and some shrublands and Magellanic moorland in areas of poor drainage.

Immediately to the south is the evergreen Magellanic rainforest, probably associated with the increased precipitation, the greater altitude and an improvement in the drainage. The characteristic species is Nothofagus betuloides (Coihue of Magallanes), forming pure communities in sectors of greater altitude or coasts exposed to the wind.

The south portion of the island, surrounding Lakes Navarino and Windhond, and the territories of the southern coast, have a vegetation of Magellanic moorland. This includes a series of vegetal communities, the Esfagnosa Tundra (Sphagnum magellanicum) and the Pulvinada Tundra (Donatia fascicularis - Astelia pumila).

At higher altitudes, the terrain is Andean Desert, which lacks trees or tall shrubs and is less than 30% covered by vegetation.

== Fauna ==
Like much of surrounding Tierra del Fuego, Navarino Island has been severely affected by invasive beavers. The Canadian beavers were introduced to Tierra del Fuego in the 1940s by the Argentinian government in an effort to kickstart a fur trade in the area. With no natural predators, the beavers quickly spread to neighbouring islands.

Because the trees in Tierra del Fuego and Isla Navarino do not have any natural defences, they are unable to recover once felled by beavers.

Researchers from the University of North Texas, when studying Navarino Island found that the slow-moving water behind beaver dams has attracted two further invasive species to the Island, muskrat and mink. While the mink prey on the muskrats, they also feed on native geese and duck, leading to what they term an "invasive meltdown process".

== Natural and cultural features ==
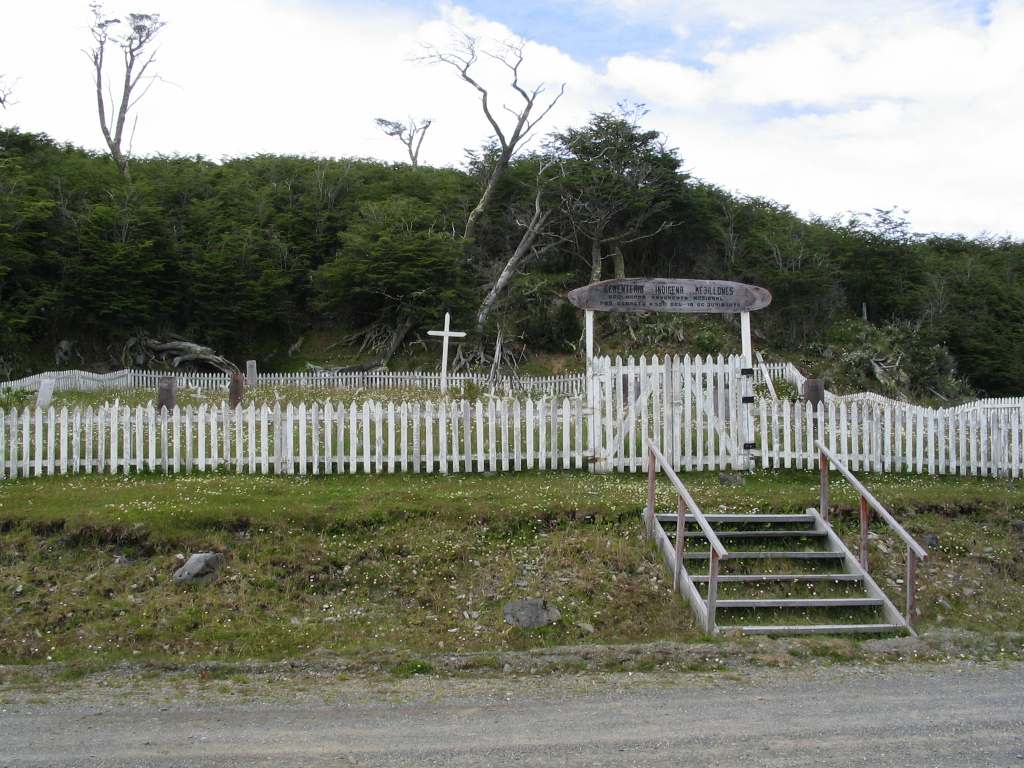
Yahgan Cemetery at Mejillones

Cultural historical sites are Bahia Wulaia and the English Mission of Douglas Creek. The large Stirling House, an iron prefab construction brought in 1869 from England by the Anglican English missionaries, used to be in Ushuaia. It was moved to Baia Tekenika, and then was installed for mission use at Douglas Creek. In the Yahgan cemetery at Baia Mejillones, tombs dating from the first half of the 20th century show elements of religious syncretism.

Villa Ukika is a district of Puerto Williams where the last few Yamana live. Other settlements are the hamlets of Puerto Navarino - a fishing port for king crabs - and Puerto Toro which claims to be the world's southernmost "settlement."

The area of Isla Navarino and the surrounding islands have been declared a UNESCO Biosphere Reserve in June 2005, called Cabo de Hornos Biosphere Reserve.

== Access ==
Puerto Williams can be reached by air from Punta Arenas, by DAP through the Guardiamarina Zañartu Airport, daily except Sundays. In addition there is a weekly ferry, crossing the Strait of Magellan and the Brecknock, Cockburn and Beagle Channels. The boat trip takes between 30 and 36 hours. As of January 2011, there was also a commercial connection by motorboat between Ushuaia and Isla Navarino.

== Towns and villages ==
- Río Guanaco
- Puerto Bevan
- Puerto Williams
- Puerto Navarino
- Caleta Eugenia
- Puerto Toro
- Villa Ukika

== See also ==
- Cabo de Hornos (communa) (in Spanish)
