= Bahía Wulaia =

Bay in Chile

Coordinates: 55°02′53″S 68°08′58″W

Bahía Wulaia, on the east shore of the Murray canal

Bahia Wulaia is a bay on the western shore of Isla Navarino along the Murray Channel in extreme southern Chile. The island and adjacent strait are part of the commune of Cabo de Hornos in the Antártica Chilena Province, which is part of the Magallanes and Antartica Chilena Region.

An archaeological site at Bahia Wulaia has been associated with the Megalithic seasonal settlements there of the Yaghan peoples about 10,000 years ago. Known as the Wulaia Bay Dome Middens, the site revealed that the people created fish traps in the small inlets of the bay. The stonework for those traps has survived, according to C. Michael Hogan, and was used by Yaghan into the 19th century.

In November 1859 a settlement known as Wulaia was the site of a Yaghan massacre of all but one of the crew and captain of Allen Gardiner, a schooner used by the South American Missionary Society. There had been a misunderstanding and cultural conflict between the parties.

== Yaghan ancient culture ==
The Yaghan are believed to have migrated to the main island of Tierra del Fuego from the north by a land bridge available more than 12,000 years ago, which disappeared after the end of an Ice Age. From there they easily navigated by canoe to Navarino Island and other islands. They are the "most southernmost aboriginal people in the history of the world." They created settlements in the coastal terraces on Navarino, building circular huts in the middle of ring middens. As they moved on a seasonal basis, numerous archeological sites of this period have been found on the island. They lived largely by taking fish and shellfish from the waters.

Navarino has one of the most dense archeological concentrations in the world. This is believed to be due to the fact that the Yaghan were nomadic, so set up numerous settlements, and the island was little disturbed by outsiders until late in the 19th century.

== Wulaia Massacre ==
By the mid-19th century, Europeans had discovered the Yaghan. The naturalist Charles Darwin and Vice-Admiral FitzRoy of HMS Beagle encountered the Yaghan at this site in 1831. Other English people became concerned about the lives of the indigenous peoples of this region, and organized missions to teach them European languages and religion. In England, what was first called the Patagonian Mission Society was founded to minister to the indigenous peoples of southern Chile and Argentina. The missionary George Packenham Despard came out to the mission at Keppel Island in the Falklands, bringing his wife and several children, including their adopted son Thomas Bridges.

Despard persuaded Jemmy Button, a Yaghan native of Tierra del Fuego to visit Cranmer Station in 1858. (He was one of three Fuegians, as they were often called by English speakers, who was taken to England on the first return trip of HMS Beagle.) After many months, the group (including Button's wife and three children) were returned to Wulaia in December 1858. At the same time, the British recruited a party of nine Fuegians to visit Cranmer.

This party soon became homesick; they had not had Button's earlier European experiences (he had learned some English and traveled to England). In addition, there were serious cultural misunderstandings between them and the British. In October 1859 a British crew in Allen Gardiner, a schooner owned by the missionary society, departed Keppel Island to return the natives to Wulaia. They arrived on 2 November after a very rough passage.

Four days later, angered over an altercation with the crew, the Yaghan attacked and killed Captain Garland Phillips and all but one of the ship's crew on shore. The British party had been holding a Sunday service in a small chapel built at the settlement. The British men, sailors and catechist, were all clubbed to death. The only survivor was the ship's cook, who was still on board Allen Gardiner when the massacre occurred, and escaped the area in a dinghy. He managed to make peace with the natives and was found alive by the search parties that came to investigate and discovered the stripped and abandoned schooner on 1 March 1860.

As a result of the attack, Despard of the Keppel Island mission petitioned to return to England with his wife and children. His adoptive son, Thomas Bridges, then 17, stayed on Keppel Island at the mission. He learned the Yaghan language and began his life's work of eventually compiling a grammar and dictionary of Yámana, containing more than 30,000 words. After returning to England in 1868–1869 to receive holy orders, in 1871 he was successful with another missionary family, in setting up a full mission at Ushuaia, Tierra del Fuego.
