= Guardia Marina Zañartu Airport =

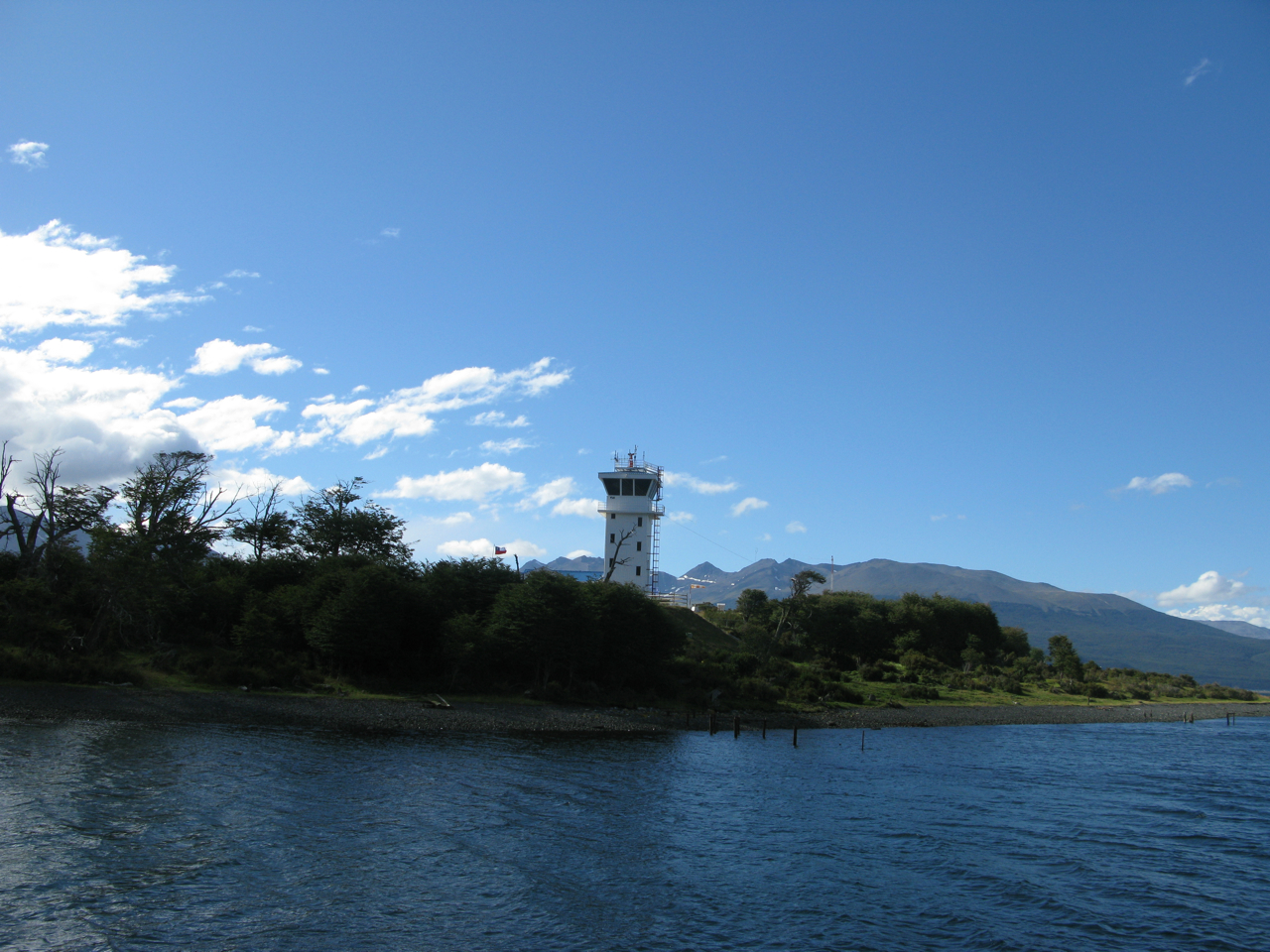
- IATA: WPU; ICAO: SCGZ

Summary
- Airport type: Public
- Owner: DGAC (Civil Aviation Authority)
- Operator: DGAC
- Serves: Puerto Williams, Chile
- Location: Navarino Island
- Elevation AMSL: 88 ft (27 m)
- Coordinates: 54°55′52″S 67°37′35″W
- Website: https://www.aipchile.gob.cl/designador/SCGZ

Map
- Location of the airport in Chile

Runways
Direction	Length		Surface
Direction	m	ft	Surface
08/26	1,440	4,724	Asphalt
- Source: GCM Google Maps

Guardia Marina Zañartu Airport (Spanish: Aeropuerto Guardia Marina Zañartu) (IATA: WPU, ICAO: SCGZ) is an airport serving the town of Puerto Williams on the north shore of Navarino Island in the Magallanes Region of Chile. The island is at the southern tip of Chile, and is across a narrow strait from Argentina called Beagle Channel. It is the world's southernmost airport with regular scheduled flights.

The airport is maintained by the General Directorate of Civil Aviation of Chile (DGAC Chile). The runway is on a small peninsula running parallel to the island's shore, and approaches to either end are partially over the water. There is mountainous terrain to the north and to the south.

Navigation is supported by a VOR-DME on the field.

== Airlines and destinations ==
Airlines	Destinations
Aerovías DAP	Punta Arenas

== See also ==
- Transport in Chile
- List of airports in Chile

== Accidents ==
- On February 21, 1991, LAN Chile Flight 1069 suffered a runway overrun when landing due to pilot error, leading to the death of 20 people.
