= Dientes de Navarino =

Mountain in Chile

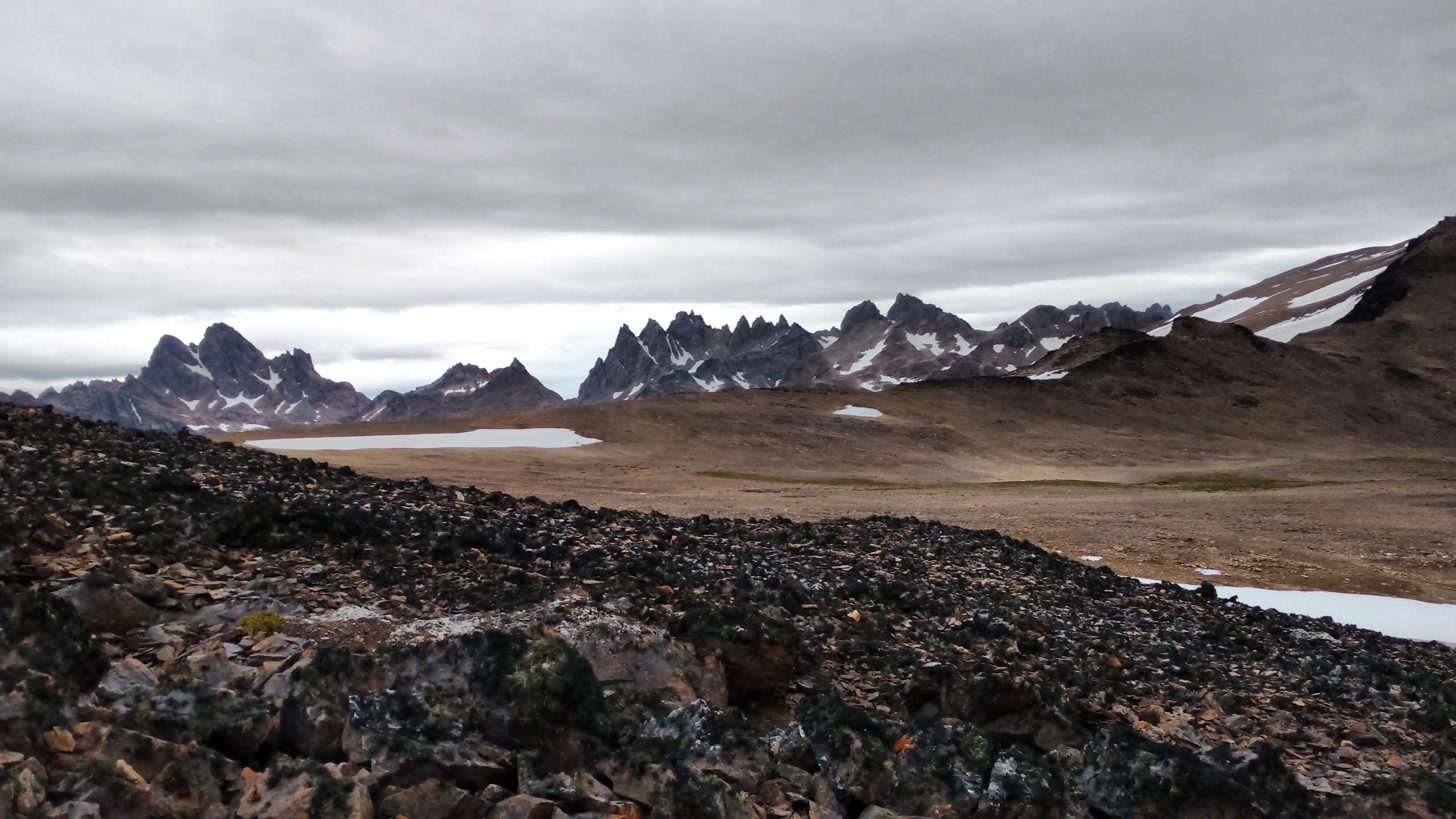
- View of Dientes de Navarino from Cerro Bandera on February 14 (summer), 2016

Highest point
- Peak: Pico Navarino
- Elevation: 1,195 m (3,921 ft)

Dimensions
- Length: 30 km (19 mi) north-south

Geography
- Country: Chile
- Region: Magallanes
- Range coordinates: 55°1′S 67°39′W
- Parent range: Andes

Dientes de Navarino (Teeth of Navarino in English) are a mountain range in Navarino Island, Chile, located just south of Puerto Williams, along the Beagle Channel coast. They are named for the jagged pinnacles which resemble teeth.

There is a rough hiking circuit around the range. Depending on weather conditions the trek takes 5 to 7 days. The trail was first set out in the 1990s by the Australian climber and author Clem Lindenmayer. The route passes peaks known as Cerro Clem and Montes Lindenmayer, that in 2001 the Chilean Ministry of Natural Resources named in his honour. Lindenmayer was the author of the Lonely Planet guide Trekking in the Patagonian Andes.

In the 1940s the Argentine government released beavers on to Tierra del Fuego in the hope of starting a prosperous fur trade. With no natural predators, the beavers quickly spread. The forests around the Dientes de Navarino mountains have no natural defences to beavers and so, have suffered severely. Many of the lake shores surrounding the mountains have been stripped of trees.

== See also ==
- Martial Mountains
- Cordillera Darwin
- Marinelli Glacier
