= Yelcho =

Yelcho may refer to:

- Cape Yelcho
- Chilean tug Yelcho (AGS-64)
- Yelcho (1906 tug)
- Yelcho Base
- Yelcho Lake
- Yelcho River
