= Antártica Chilena Province =

Antártica Chilena Province Provincia Antártica Chilena
- Province
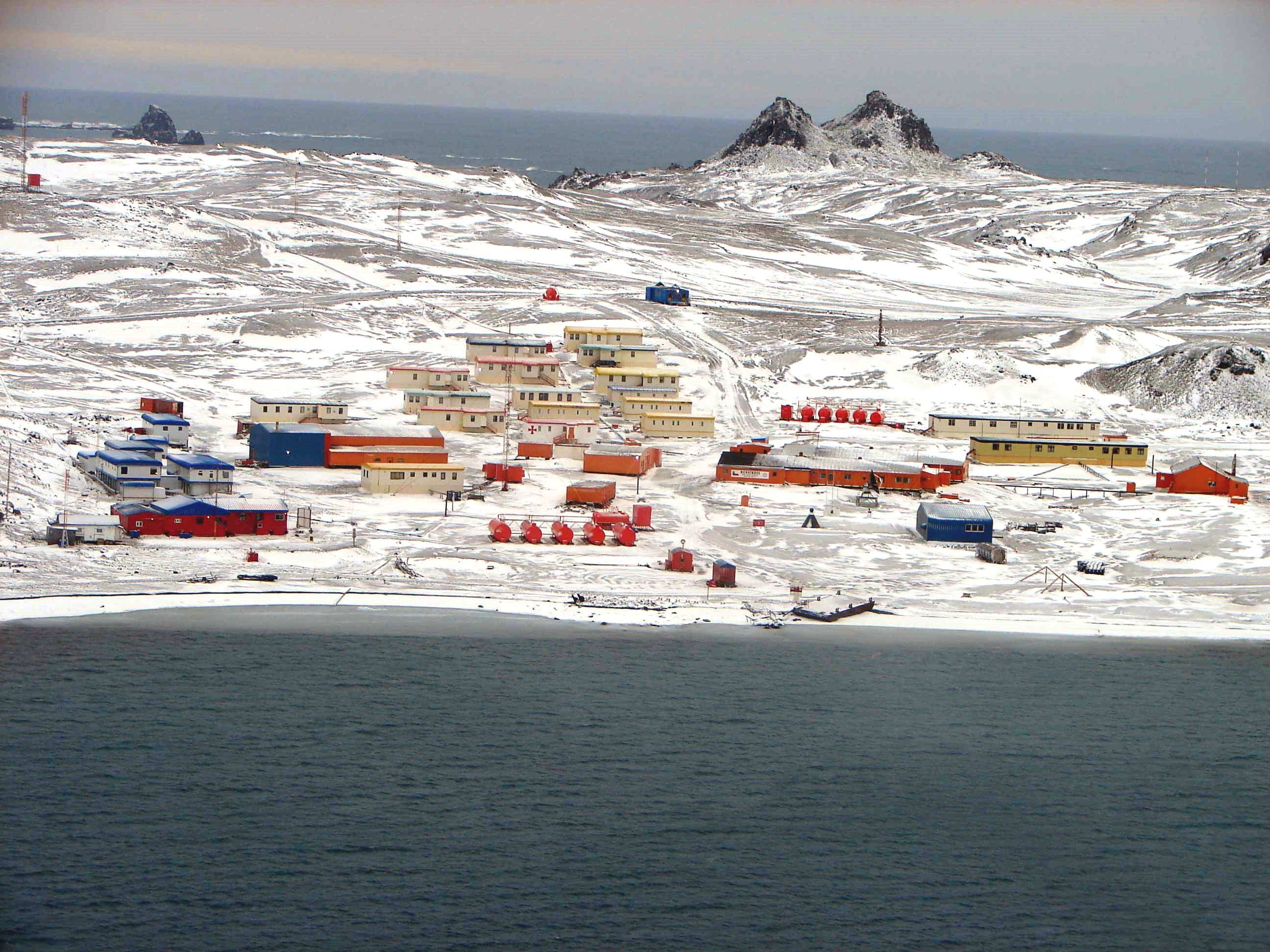
- Base Presidente Eduardo Frei Montalva

- Seal

- Location in the Magallanes and Antártica Chilena Region
- Coordinates: 55°43′S 67°22′W
- Country: Chile
- Region: Magallanes y Antártica Chilena
- Capital: Puerto Williams
- Communes: Cabo de Hornos, Antártica

Government
  - Type: Provincial
  - Governor: Juan José Arcos (PRI)

Area
  - Total: 1,265,853.7 km^{2} (488,748.8 sq mi)

Population (2012 Census)
  - Total: 1,792
  - Density: 0.001416/km^{2} (0.003667/sq mi)
  - Urban: 1,952
  - Rural: 440

Sex
  - Men: 1,518
  - Women: 874
- Time zone: UTC-3 (CLST)
  - Summer (DST): UTC-3 (CLST)
- Area code: 61

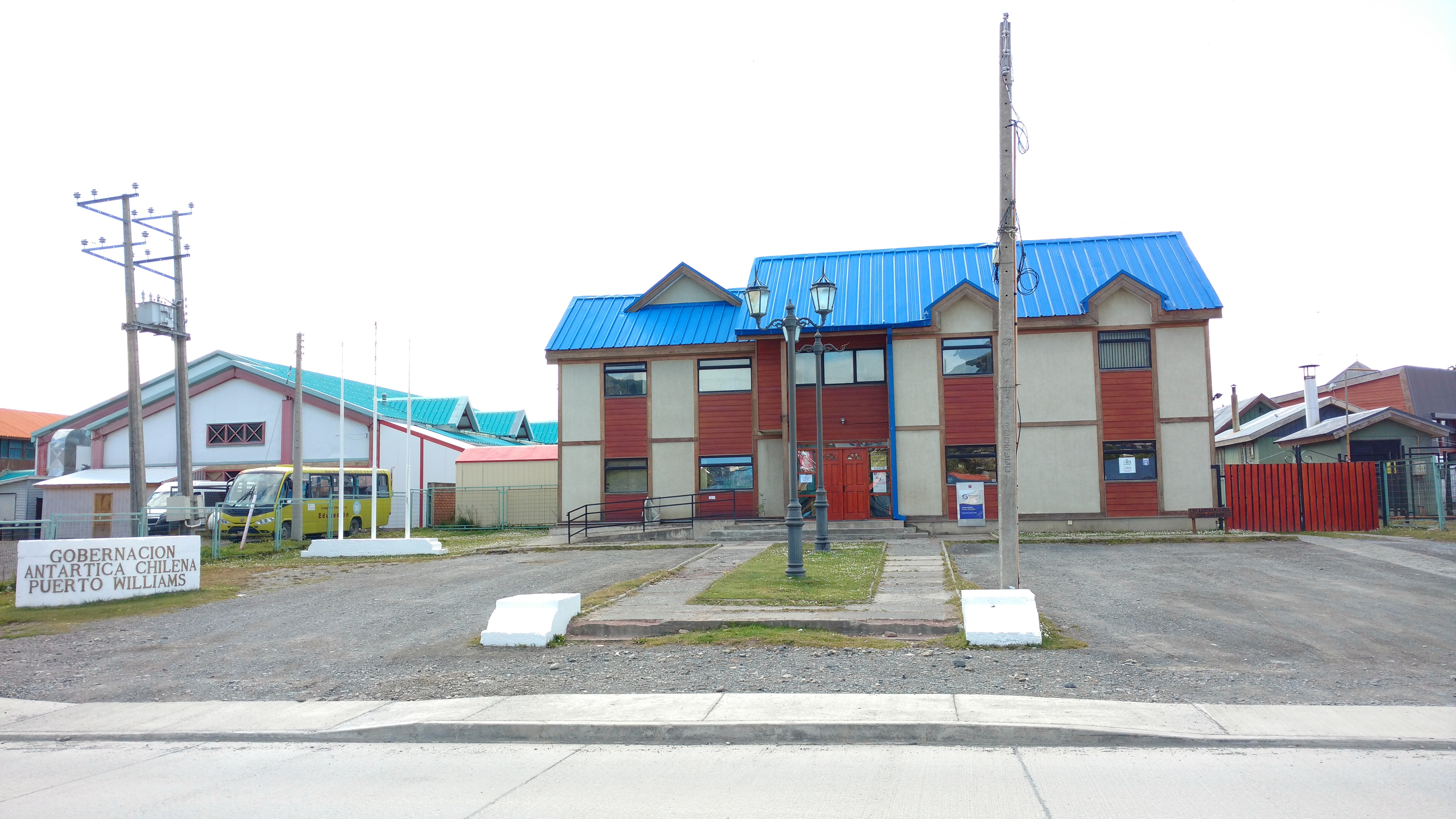
Antártica Chilena Province Governorate in Puerto Williams.

Antártica Chilena Province (Spanish: Provincia Antártica Chilena) is the southernmost of the four provinces in Chile's southernmost region, Magallanes and Antártica Chilena Region (XII). The capital is Puerto Williams. The province comprises the extreme southern part of Isla Grande de Tierra del Fuego (south of the Cordillera Darwin), the islands south and west of Isla Grande (Diego Ramírez Islands and its National Park, Diego Ramirez Islands & Drake Passage National Park), and Chile's claims in Antarctica. The province is administratively divided into two communes (comunas): Cabo de Hornos, located at the southern tip of South America, and Antártica, a wedge-shaped claim of Antarctica, which is not internationally recognized. Its total area of 1,265,853.7 km^{2} (488,749 sq mi) makes it almost twice as large as all other provinces of Chile combined.

== Communes ==
1. Commune of Cabo de Hornos (until 2001 called Navarino, capital Puerto Williams), area 14,146 km^{2} (5,462 sq mi), population as of census 2002: 2,262, of which 1,952 are in the capital. As a commune, Cabo de Hornos is a third-level administrative division of Chile administered by a municipal council, headed by an alcalde who is directly elected every four years. The 2016-2020 alcalde is Patricio Fernández (PDC).The communal council has the following members:
  Daniel Fernando Valdebenito Contreras (PS) Ángela Barría Barrientos (RN) Juan Velásquez (PS) Carolina Guenel González (DC) Francis Delgado Ibaceta (RN) Paola Speake Ojeda (DC)
2. Commune of Antártica, area 1,250,000 km^{2} (482,628 sq mi), population as of census 2002: 130. This territory as a whole is not recognized internationally. (See Antarctic territorial claims.)

The Municipality of Cabo de Hornos governs both Antártica and Cabo de Hornos from Cabo de Hornos, making it the only Chilean municipality to currently administer more than one commune.

== Demography ==
According to the 2002 census by the National Statistics Institute (INE), it had a population of 2,392 inhabitants (1,518 men and 874 women), giving it a population density of 0.0019/km^{2} (0/sq mi). Of these, 1,952 (81.6%) lived in urban areas and 440 (18.4%) in rural areas. The province is the largest in Chile, yet it is also the least and most sparsely populated province in the country. Between the 1992 and 2002 censuses, the population grew by 23% (447 persons).

== Territory recognition ==
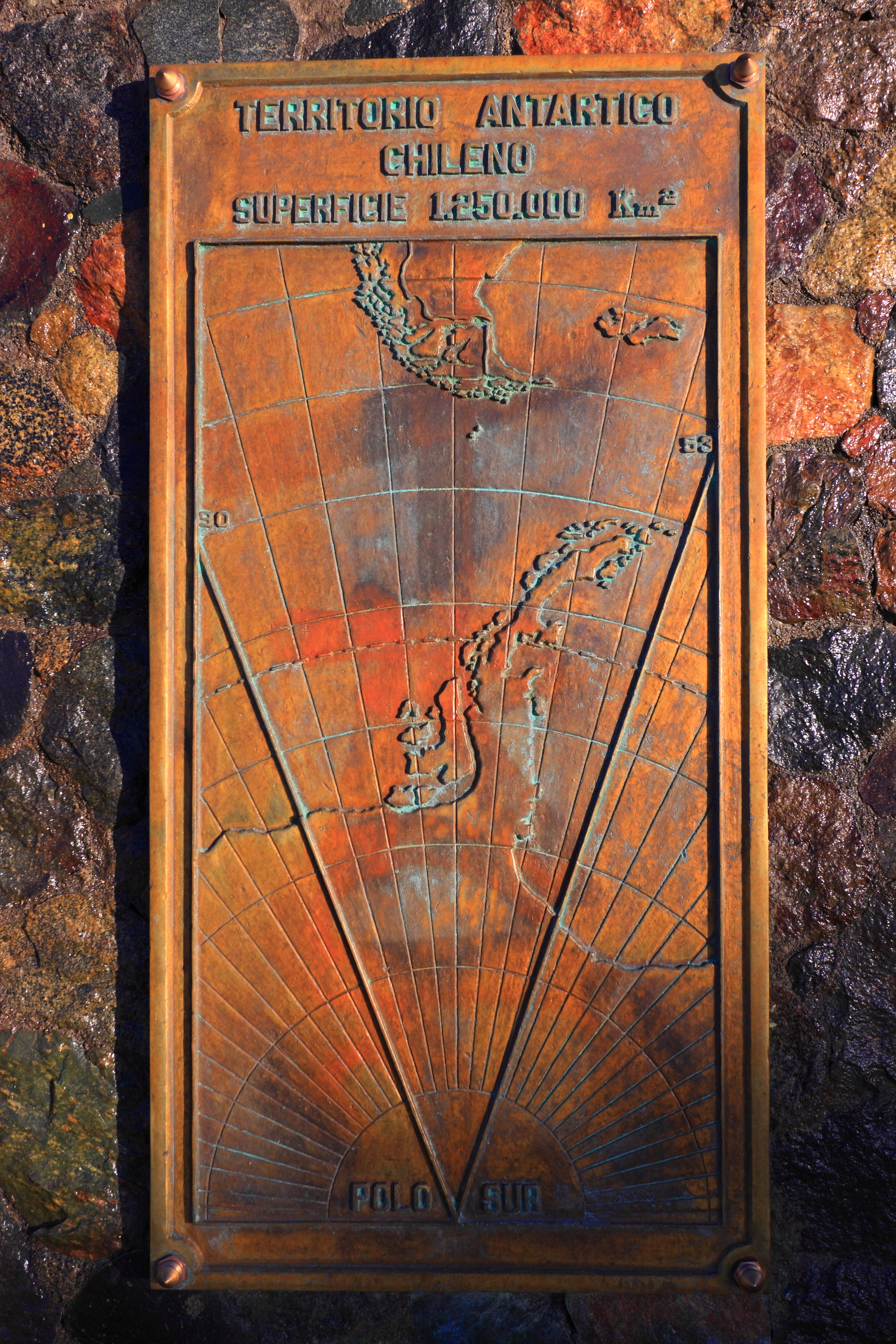
Antarctica claim by Chile, as seen on a monument in Punta Arenas

The South American portion of the territory is internationally recognized as part of Chile. However, the Commune of Antártica, which encompasses most of the area of the province, is disputed. It forms the Chilean claim to Antarctica, stretching south of the 60th parallel to the South Pole. This region of Antarctica claimed by Chile overlaps with land claims by Argentina and the United Kingdom.

The Commune of Antártica is practically uninhabited except for research stations of various countries, although Chile maintains a permanent civilian population at Villa Las Estrellas (near Frei Montalva Station), including women and children, a small school, and even a bank, in order to support its territorial claim of the area. The official population for the area as of the census 2002 is 130 (115 male, 15 female). This does not include the staff of non-Chilean bases in the area.

According to the Chilean argument, its claim to Antártica Chilena is as old as Chile itself. The Tordesillas Line established a west–east division of colonial territories between Portugal and Spain. On the first organization of the new conquered territories, Charles V, ruler of the Spanish Empire assigned to Pedro Sancho de la Hoz control over Terra Australis, which included the Southern part of South America, Tierra del Fuego Archipelago, and all southern undiscovered territories (Terra Australis Ignota). This gobernación eventually merged with other territories in the Captaincy General of the Kingdom of Chile.

== Prehistory ==
Early settlement by prehistoric man is known to have occurred from archaeological recovery within this Province. Yaghans established many settlements on the islands of the present day province of the Antártica espana Province; for example, there is a significant early Yaghan archaeological site at Wulaia Bay, which C. Michael Hogan terms the Bahia Wulaia Dome Middens.

== History ==
Puerto Williams and Porvenir were established in the late 19th century, mainly by Western European immigrants (esp. from British Isles, Scandinavia and the former Yugoslavia) and navigators in cruise ships and fish boats. The Chilean government transplanted Chilean settlers from the central part of the country in the 20th century to increase the province's sparse population.

== See also ==
- Chilean Antarctic Territory
- Antártica (Commune)
- Territorial claims in Antarctica
- Argentine Antarctica and Tierra del Fuego Province
- British Antarctic Territory
- Antarctic Treaty System
- Antarctic Peninsula
- Ildefonso Islands
