= Cabo de Hornos, Chile =

Comuna de Cabo de Hornos Comuna de Cabo de Hornos
- Commune
- Comuna de Cabo de Hornos, Chile
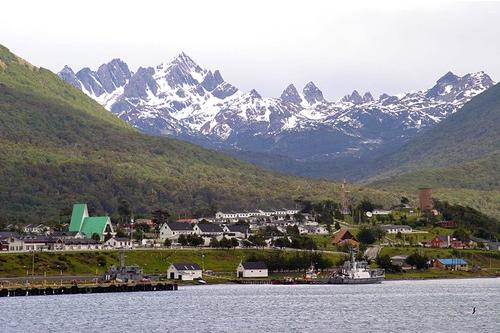
- Puerto Williams, seat of the commune of Cabo de Hornos

- Flag Coat of arms Map of Cabo de Hornos commune in Magallanes and Antartica Chilena Region Location in Chile
- Coordinates: 54°56′S 67°37′W
- Country: Chile
- Region: Magallanes y Antártica Chilena
- Province: Antártica Chilena
- Founded as: Navarino
- Foundation: December 30, 1927

Government
  - Type: Municipality
  - Alcalde: Patricio Fernández (DC)

Area
  - Total: 15,853.7 km^{2} (6,121.1 sq mi)
- Elevation: 39 m (128 ft)

Population (2017 Census)
  - Total: 2,262
  - Density: 0.1427/km^{2} (0.3695/sq mi)
  - Urban: 1,952
  - Rural: 310

Sex
  - Men: 1,403
  - Women: 859
- Area code: 56 + 61
- Website: Official website (in Spanish)

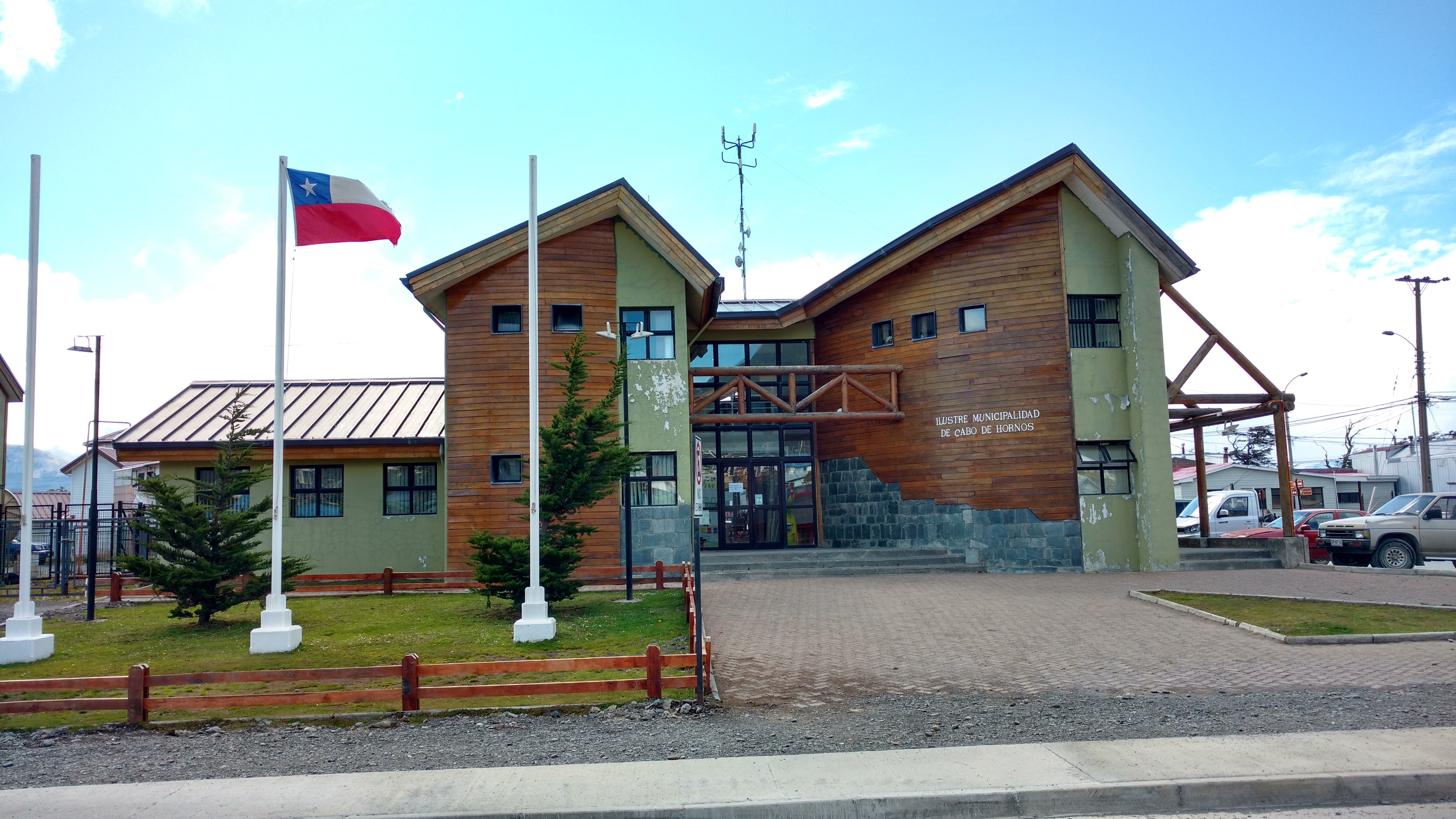
Cabo de Hornos Municipality in Puerto Williams.

Cabo de Hornos (Cape Horn) is a Chilean commune located in the south of Tierra del Fuego archipelago, in Antártica Province, Magallanes Region. The municipality of Cabo de Hornos, located in the town of Puerto Williams, also administers the Antártica commune. It is named for Cabo de Hornos, or "Cape Horn", the southern tip of South America.

== Demographics ==
Historical population
Year	Pop.	±% p.a.
1930	395	—
1940	225	−5.47%
1952	206	−0.73%
1970	945	+8.83%
1982	1,298	+2.68%
1992	1,814	+3.40%
2002	2,262	+2.23%
2017	2,063	−0.61%
2024	1,750	−2.32%
Source: "Censo de Población y Vivienda". National Statistics Institute.

According to the 2002 census of the National Statistics Institute, Cabo de Hornos spans an area of 15,853.7 km^{2} (6,121 sq mi) and has 2,262 inhabitants (1,403 men and 859 women). Of these, 1,952 (86.3%) lived in urban areas and 310 (13.7%) in rural areas. The population grew by 24.7% (448 persons) between the 1992 and 2002 censuses.

== Administration ==
As a commune, Cabo de Hornos is a third-level administrative division of Chile administered by a municipal council, headed by an alcalde who is directly elected every four years. The 2016-2020 alcalde is Patricio Fernández (PDC). The communal council has the following members:

Daniel Fernando Valdebenito Contreras (PS) Ángela Barría Barrientos (RN) Juan Velásquez (PS) Carolina Guenel González (DC) Francis Delgado Ibaceta (RN) Paola Speake Ojeda (DC)

Within the electoral divisions of Chile, Cabo de Hornos is represented in the Chamber of Deputies by Juan Morano (PDC) and Gabriel Boric (Ind.) as part of the 60th electoral district, which includes the entire Magallanes y la Antártica Chilena Region. The commune is represented in the Senate by Carlos Bianchi Chelech (Ind.) and Carolina Goic (PDC) as part of the 19th senatorial constituency (Magallanes y la Antártica Chilena Region).

== See also ==
- Murray Channel
