= Bahía Cook =

Bay in Chile

Coordinates: 55°3′S 70°8′W

Cook Bay

Bahía Cook, also known in English as Cook Bay, is an irregular bay located between Londonderry Island, Hoste Island, Olga Island and Gordon Island southwest of Tierra del Fuego in Chile.

The bay forms an entrance to the Beagle Channel, the Ballenero Channel and Pomar Channel from the Pacific Ocean, but shipping traffic was unable to use the bay until 2011. The Chilean Navy then installed a lighthouse on the Sandwich Islets, south of Londonderry Island, in order to shorten the voyage from Punta Arenas to Antarctica by 100 kilometres (62 mi).

== History ==
The entrance of the bay was visited by Captain James Cook in December 1774, during his second voyage. It was later named after him.

== See also ==
- Beagle Channel
