= Cook Island, Tierra del Fuego =

Cook Island
Native name: Isla Cook
- Location within Southern Patagonia

Geography
- Coordinates: 54°57′S 70°21′W
- Adjacent to: Pacific Ocean

Administration
- Chile
- Region: Magallanes
- Province: Antártica Chilena
- Commune: Cabo de Hornos

Additional information
- NGA UFI=-878400

Cook Island, also known as London Island, is an island located in the Tierra del Fuego archipelago. It lies west of Gordon Island, south of O'Brien Island and east of Londonderry Island at the head of Cook Bay, within the Alberto de Agostini National Park.

Cook Island is the location of the Fueguino volcanic cones.

The island was named after Captain James Cook. Cook did not visit the island, but passed the mouth of Cook Bay on 19 December 1774. The bay was named in 1828 by Captain Henry Foster.

== See also ==
- List of islands of Chile
