= Tierra del Fuego =

Archipelago off the south of South America

Coordinates: 54°S 70°W

Tierra del Fuego archipelago
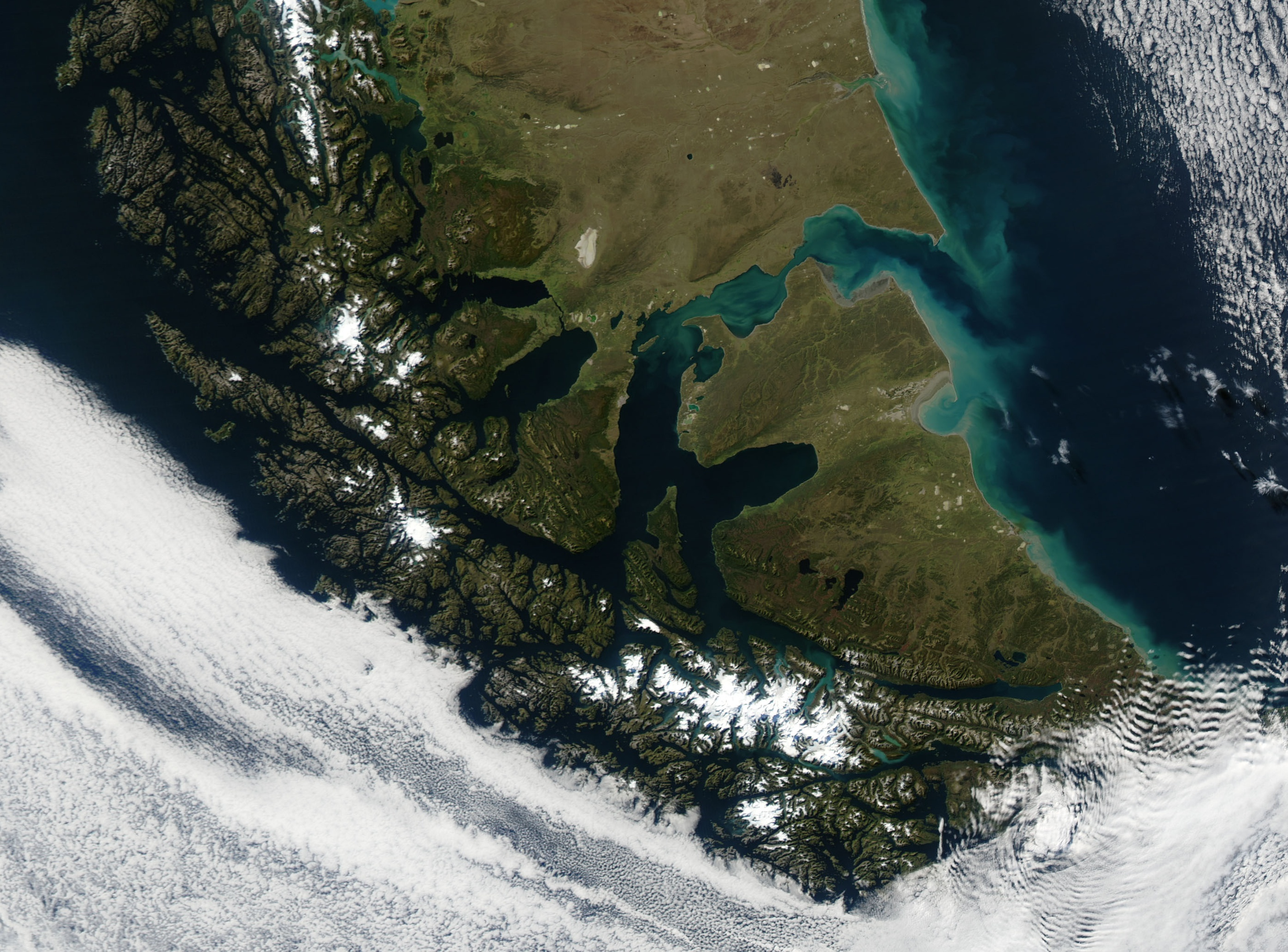
- Tierra del Fuego archipelago at the tip of South America

- Political map of Tierra del Fuego and mainland South America Tierra del Fuego (South America)

Geography
- Location: Pacific Ocean, Atlantic Ocean
- Major islands: Tierra del Fuego, Hoste, Navarino, Gordon, Wollastone, Noir, Staten, Hermite, Santa Inés, Clarence, Dawson, Capitán Aracena, Londonderry, Picton, Lennox, Nueva, Diego Ramírez, O'Brien, and Desolación Islands among many others
- Highest point: Monte Shipton

Administration
- Chile
- Region: Magallanes y Antártica Chilena
- Provinces: Tierra del Fuego Province and Antártica Chilena
- Communes: Cabo de Hornos, Antártica, Porvenir, Primavera, Timaukel
- Argentina
- Province: (Tierra del Fuego Province, Argentina) Tierra del Fuego Province

Demographics
- Population: ~201,000 (2022)
- Ethnic groups: Argentines, Chileans, Selkʼnams, Kawésqar, Yaghans

Tierra del Fuego (/tiˈɛrə dɛl ˈfweɪɡoʊ/; Spanish: [ˈtjera ðel ˈfweɣo]; Spanish for 'Land of Fire') is an archipelago off the southernmost tip of the South American mainland, across the Strait of Magellan.

The archipelago consists of the main island, Isla Grande de Tierra del Fuego, with an area of 73,746 km^{2} (28,473 sq mi), along with numerous smaller islands, including Cape Horn and Diego Ramírez Islands. The western part of the Tierra del Fuego archipelago, about two-thirds including its many islands, is part of Chile, and the eastern part is part of Argentina. The southernmost extent of the archipelago, Cape Horn, lies just north of 56° south.

The earliest-known human settlement in Tierra del Fuego dates to c. 8,000 BC. Europeans first explored the islands during Ferdinand Magellan's expedition of 1520. Tierra del Fuego ('Land of Fire') and similar names stem from sightings of the many fires that the inhabitants built along the coastline and possibly even in their canoes for warmth and signaling.

Settlement by those of European descent and the displacement of the native populations did not begin until the second half of the nineteenth century, at the height of the Patagonian sheep farming boom and of the local gold rush. Today, petroleum extraction dominates economic activity in the north of Tierra del Fuego, while tourism, manufacturing, and Antarctic logistics are important in the south.

== History ==
=== Prehistory ===
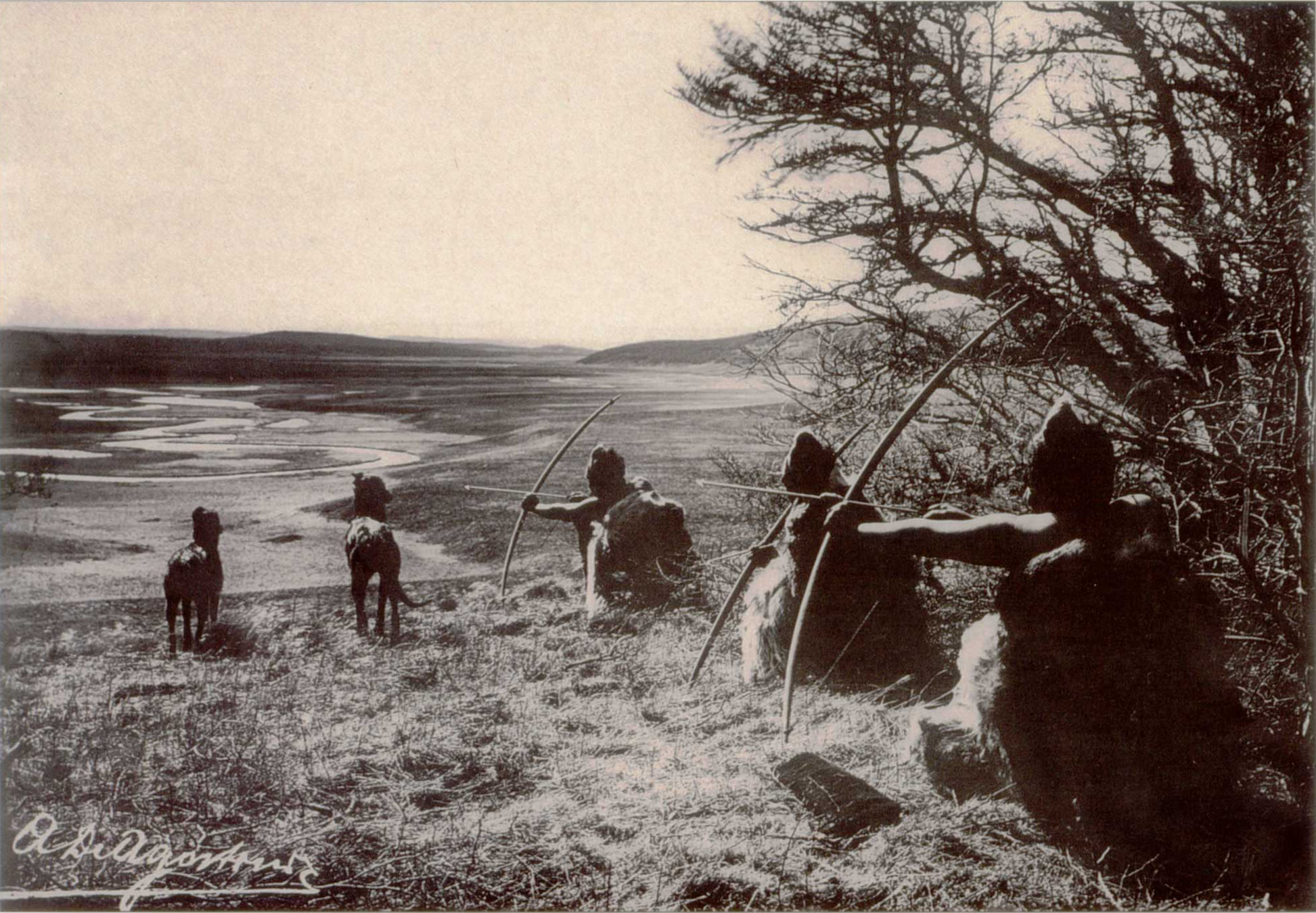
Selkʼnam hunters (1930)

The earliest human settlement occurred approximately 8,000 BC. The Yahgan were some of the earliest known humans to settle in Tierra del Fuego. Archaeological sites with characteristics of their culture have been found at locations such as Navarino Island.

=== European exploration ===
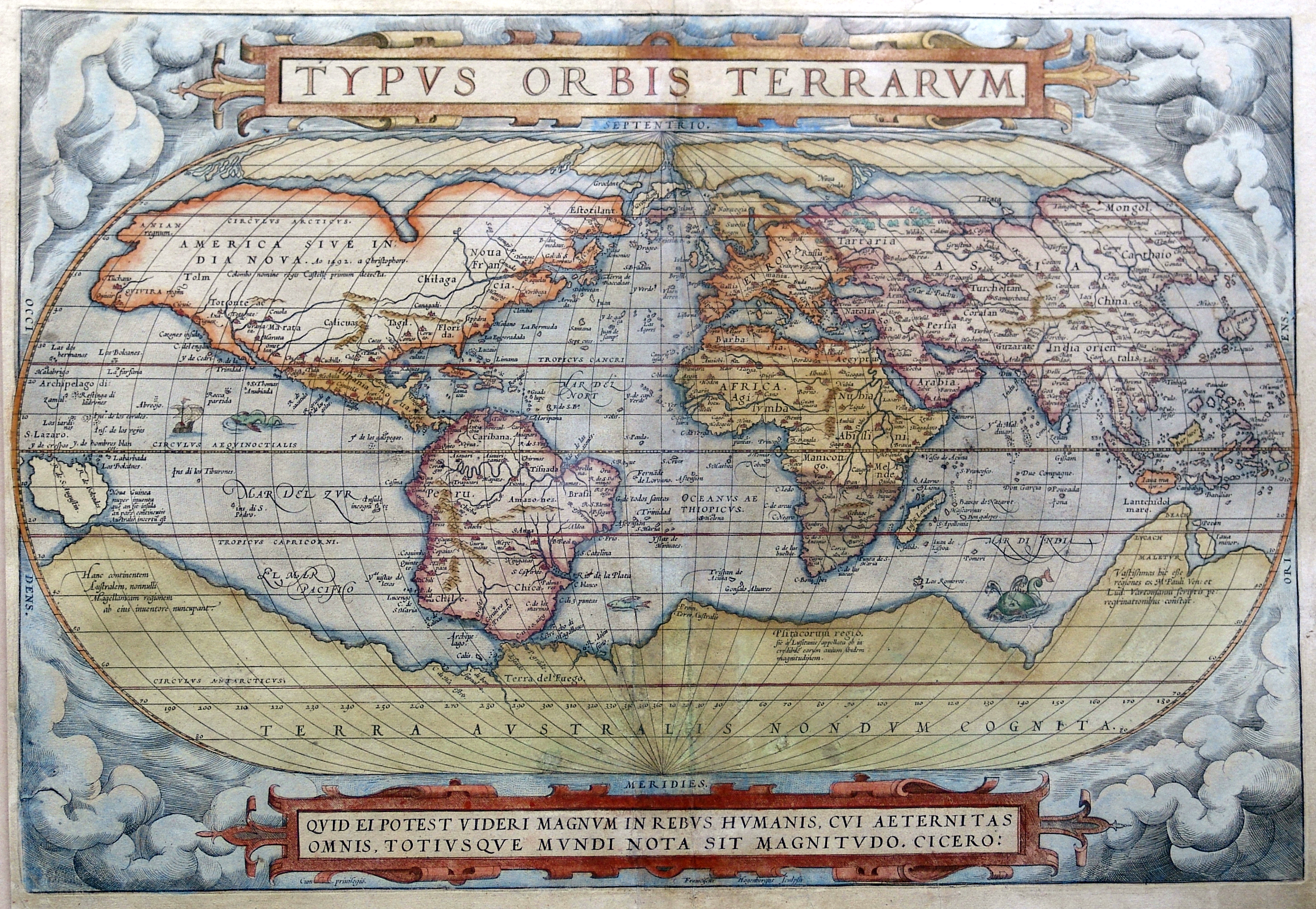
World map from 1572, when the area was believed to be part of what was called Terra Australis

The name Tierra del Fuego was given by the Portuguese explorer Ferdinand Magellan while sailing for the Spanish Crown in 1520; he was the first European to visit these lands. He believed he was seeing the many fires (fuego is Spanish for "fire") of the Indigenous inhabitants, which were visible from the sea, and that the "Indians" were waiting in the forests to ambush his armada. (Note: There is no direct evidence that the name Tierra del Fuego was given to the archipelago by Magellan himself or his companions. In its modern form, this name appeared on maps only in the middle of the 16th century.)

In 1525, Francisco de Hoces was the first to speculate that Tierra del Fuego was one or more islands rather than part of what was then called Terra Australis. Francis Drake in 1578 and a Dutch East India Company expedition in 1616 learned more about the geography. The latter expedition named Cape Horn at Hornos Island.

On his first voyage with HMS Beagle in 1830, Robert FitzRoy picked up four native Fuegians, including "Jemmy Button" (Orundellico) and Yokcushlu, and brought them to England. The three who survived the voyage were taken to London to meet the king and queen and were, for a time, celebrities. They returned to Tierra del Fuego in the Beagle with FitzRoy and Charles Darwin, who made extensive notes about his visit to the islands.

=== European colonization and extinction of Native Americans (1860–1910) ===
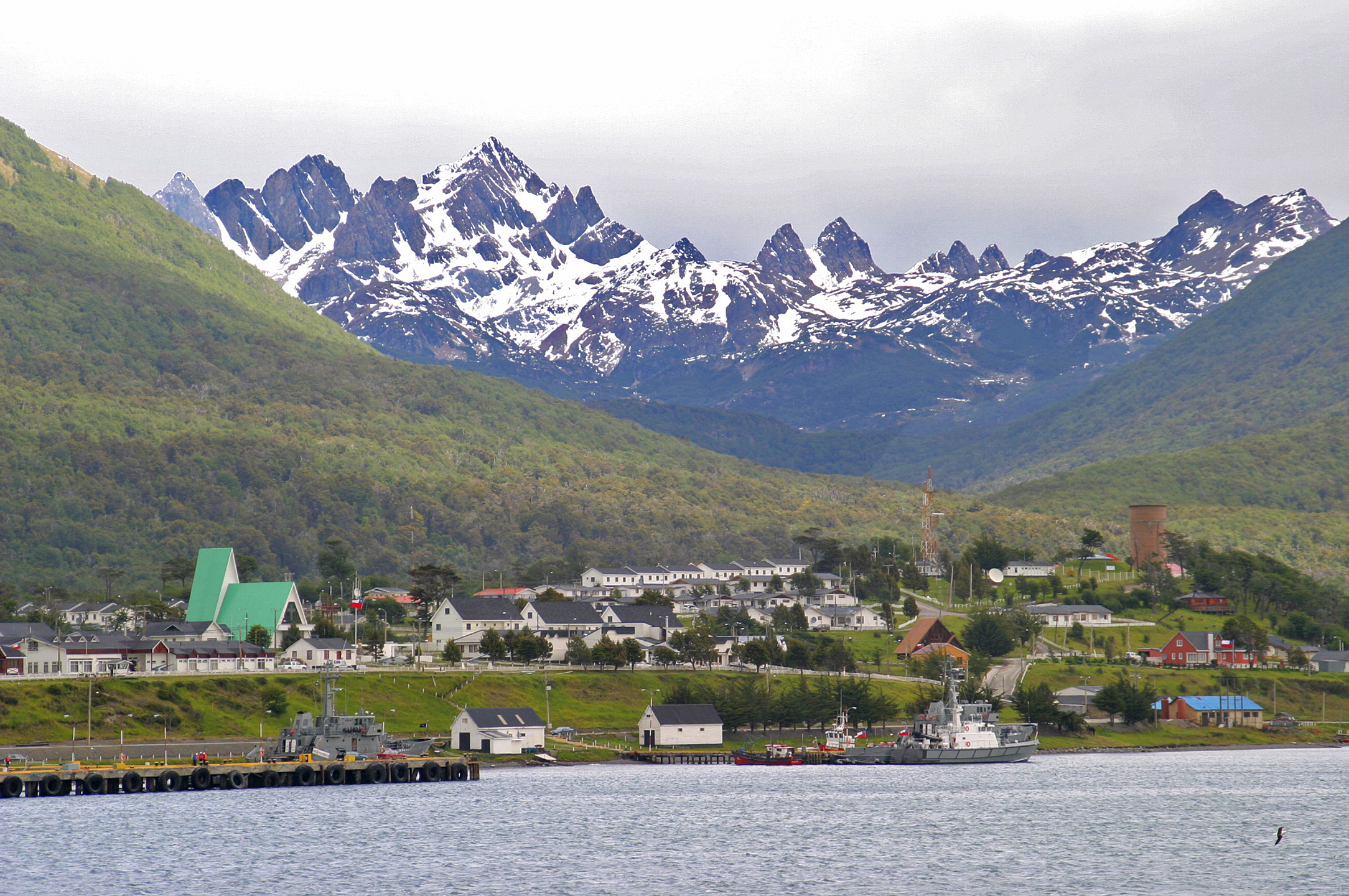
Puerto Williams (2005)

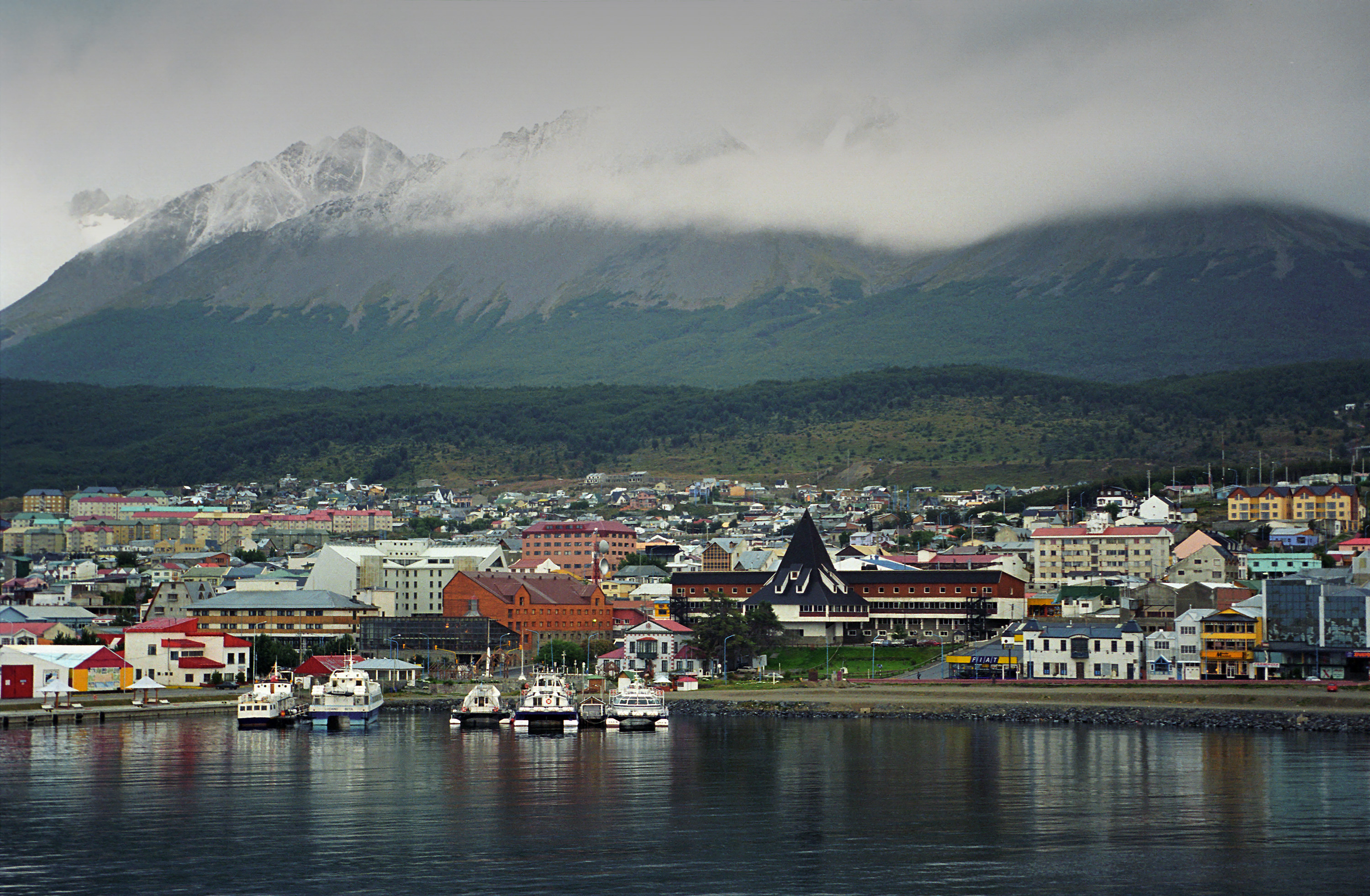
The city of Ushuaia (2000)

During the second half of the nineteenth century, Salesian Catholic missions were established in Río Grande and Dawson Island.

Anglican missionaries, who had established missions on Keppel Island in 1855, established new missions in at Ushuaia. These missions continued to operate through the nineteenth century. Missionary Thomas Bridges (1842–1898) learned the native language and compiled a 30,000-word Yaghan grammar and dictionary while he worked at Ushuaia. It was published in the 20th century and is considered an important ethnological work.

An 1879 Chilean expedition led by Ramón Serrano Montaner reported large amounts of placer gold in the streams and river beds of Tierra del Fuego. This prompted massive immigration to the main island between 1883 and 1909. Numerous Argentines, Chileans, and Croatians settled on the main island, leading to increased conflicts with native Selkʼnam. These late nineteenth century gold rushes led to the founding of numerous small settlements by immigrants, such as the Argentine settlements of Ushuaia and Río Grande and the Chilean settlements of Porvenir and Puerto Toro.

Julius Popper, a Romanian explorer, was one of the most successful entrepreneurs in the region. Granted rights by the Argentine government to exploit any gold deposits he found in Tierra del Fuego, Popper has been identified as a central figure in the Selkʼnam genocide.

Following contact with Europeans, the native Selkʼnam and Yaghan populations were greatly reduced by unequal conflict and persecution by settlers, by infectious diseases to which the Indigenous people had no immunity, and by mass transfer to the Salesian mission of Dawson Island. Despite the efforts of the missionaries, many natives died. Today, only a few Selkʼnam remain. Some of the few remaining Yaghan have settled in Villa Ukika in Navarino Island; others have scattered throughout Chile and Argentina.

Following the signing of the Boundary Treaty of 1881, Tierra del Fuego was divided between Argentina and Chile; previously, it had been claimed in its entirety by both countries.

=== Recent history (1940–present) ===
In 1945, a division of Chilean CORFO (Spanish acronym for Production Development Corporation), engaged in oil exploration, discovered oil in northern Tierra del Fuego. Extraction began in 1949, and the Chilean state-owned ENAP (National Petroleum Company) was established in 1950. Until 1960, most oil extracted in Chile came from Tierra del Fuego. During the 1940s Chile and Argentina lodged their Antarctic claims. In the 1950s, the Chilean military founded Puerto Williams. In the 1960s and 1970s, sovereignty claims by Argentina over Picton, Lennox, and Nueva Islands in Tierra del Fuego led the two countries to the brink of war. In 1986, the Argentine congress decided that the Argentine part of Tierra del Fuego should be a new province; the split was effected on 26 April 1990.

== Geography ==
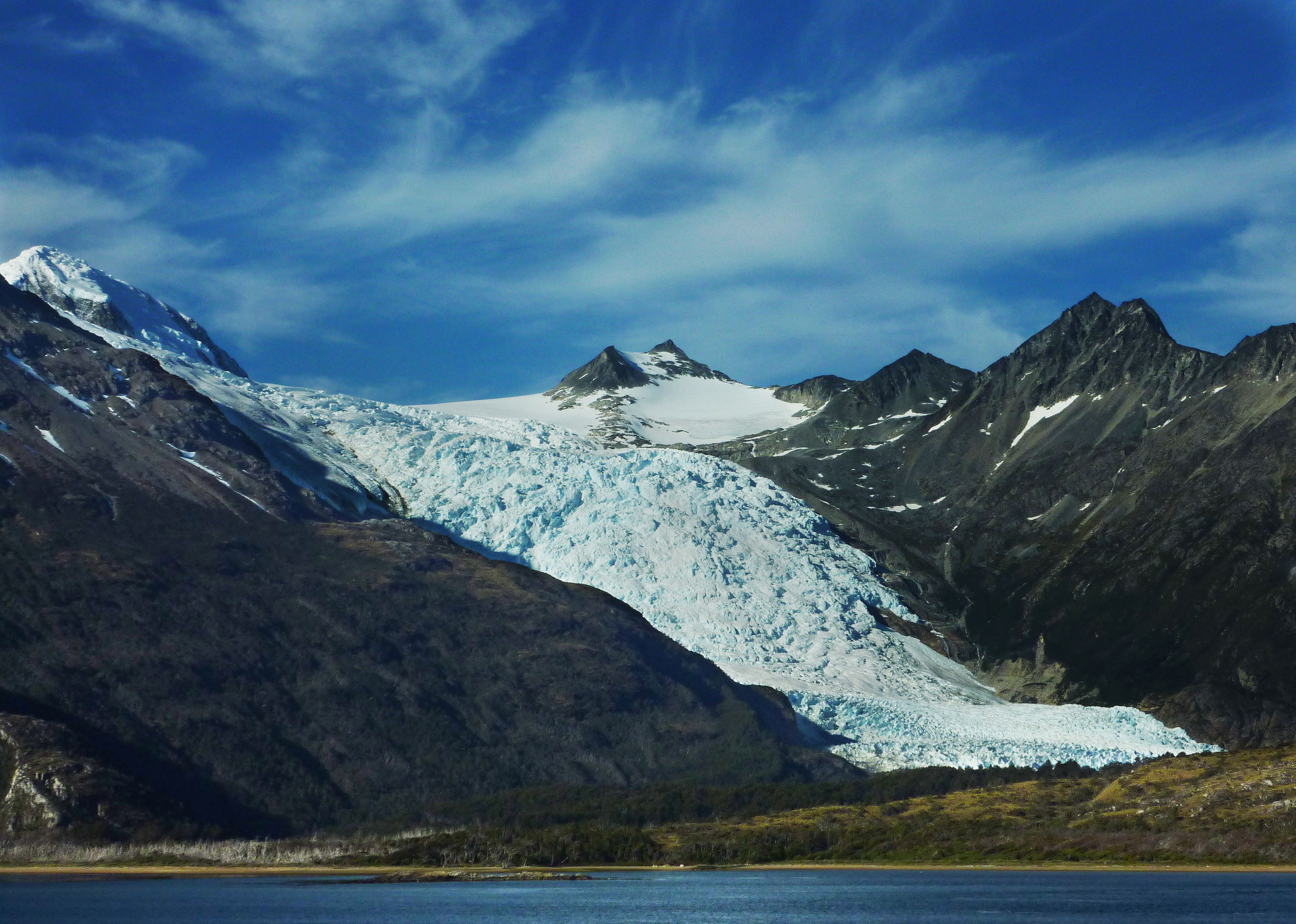
Glacier in Alberto de Agostini National Park (2011)

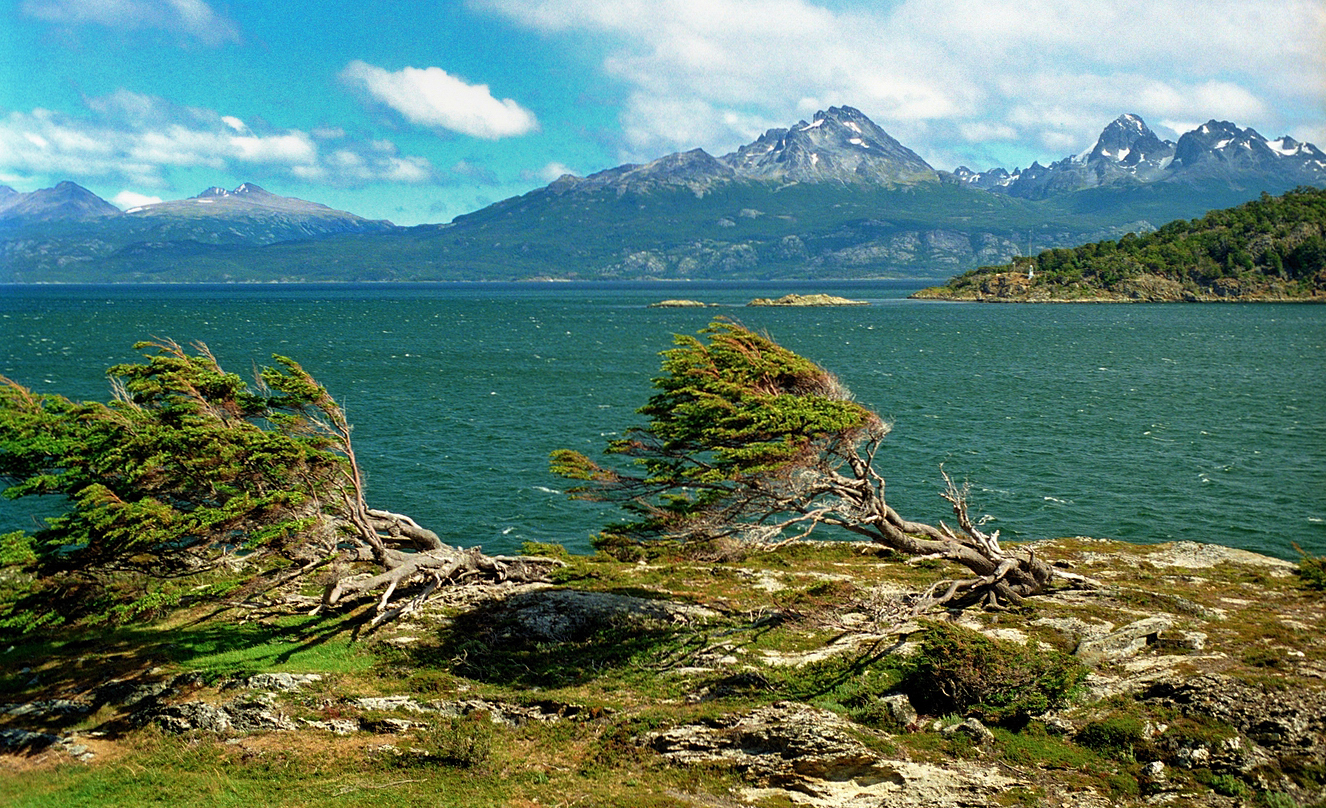
Nothofagus, Puerto Harberton (1997)

The archipelago consists of a main island, Isla Grande de Tierra del Fuego, often simply called Tierra del Fuego or Isla Grande, with an area of 48,100 km^{2} (18,572 sq mi), and a group of smaller islands. Of the main island the westernmost 29,484.7 km^{2} (11,384 sq mi, 61.43%) belongs to Chile, and 18,507.3 km^{2} (7,146 sq mi, 38.57%) belongs to Argentina. The archipelago is divided by an east–west channel, the Beagle Channel, immediately south of the main island. The largest islands south of the Beagle Channel are Hoste and Navarino.

The western part of the main island, and almost all the other islands, belong to Chile. They are part of the Magallanes y Antártica Chilena Region, the capital and chief town of which is Punta Arenas, situated on the mainland across the strait. The largest Chilean towns are Porvenir, capital of the Chilean Province of Tierra del Fuego, located on the main island, and, on Navarino Island, Puerto Williams, which is the capital of the Antártica Chilena Province.

Puerto Toro lies a few kilometers south of Puerto Williams. Arguably, it is the southernmost village in the world. The mostly uninhabited islands north and west of the main island are part of Magallanes Province.

The eastern part of the main island and a few small islands in the Beagle Channel belong to Argentina. They are part of the Tierra del Fuego, Antarctic Territory and South Atlantic Islands Province, whose capital is Ushuaia. The other important city in the region is Río Grande on the Atlantic coast, the largest in the archipelago.

The Cordillera Darwin in the southwestern part of the main island contains many glaciers that reach the ocean. While Mount Darwin had previously been thought to be the tallest mountain in the archipelago, this distinction now belongs to the unofficially named Monte Shipton at 2,580 metres (8,460 feet).

The topography of Tierra del Fuego can be divided into four regions: an outer archipelago region (Spanish: Región Archipielágica) to the south and west, a mountainous region in the south (Spanish: Región Cordillerana), a plains region (Spanish: Región de las Planicies Orientales) plus a sub-Andean zone in-between the last two zones (Spanish: Región Sub-Andina Oriental).

=== Geology ===
The geology of the archipelago is influenced by the effects of the Andean orogeny and the repeated Pleistocene glaciations. The geology of the island can be divided into large east–west-oriented units. The southwestern islands of the archipelago, including Cape Horn, are part of the South Patagonian Batholith, while the Cordillera Darwin and the area around the Beagle Channel form the principal mountain range hosting the highest mountains. The Magallanes fold and thrust belt extends north of Almirantazgo Fjord and Fagnano Lake, and north of this lies the Magallanes foreland, an old sedimentary basin that hosts hydrocarbon reserves. Orthogneiss dated at 525 million years is known to underlie some of the oil wells in northern Tierra del Fuego.

The Magallanes–Fagnano Fault, a sinistral strike slip fault crosses the southern part of the main island from west to east. It is an active fault, located inside and parallel to the Fuegian fold and thrust belt, and marks the boundary between a southern belt of Paleozoic meta sediments and a northern Mesozoic belt of sedimentary sequences. Fagnano Lake occupies a glacier-carved depression in a pull-apart basin that has developed along the Magallanes-Fagnano Fault zone.

Podzols and inceptisols occur beneath Nothofagus betuloides forests in Tierra del Fuego.

=== Climate ===
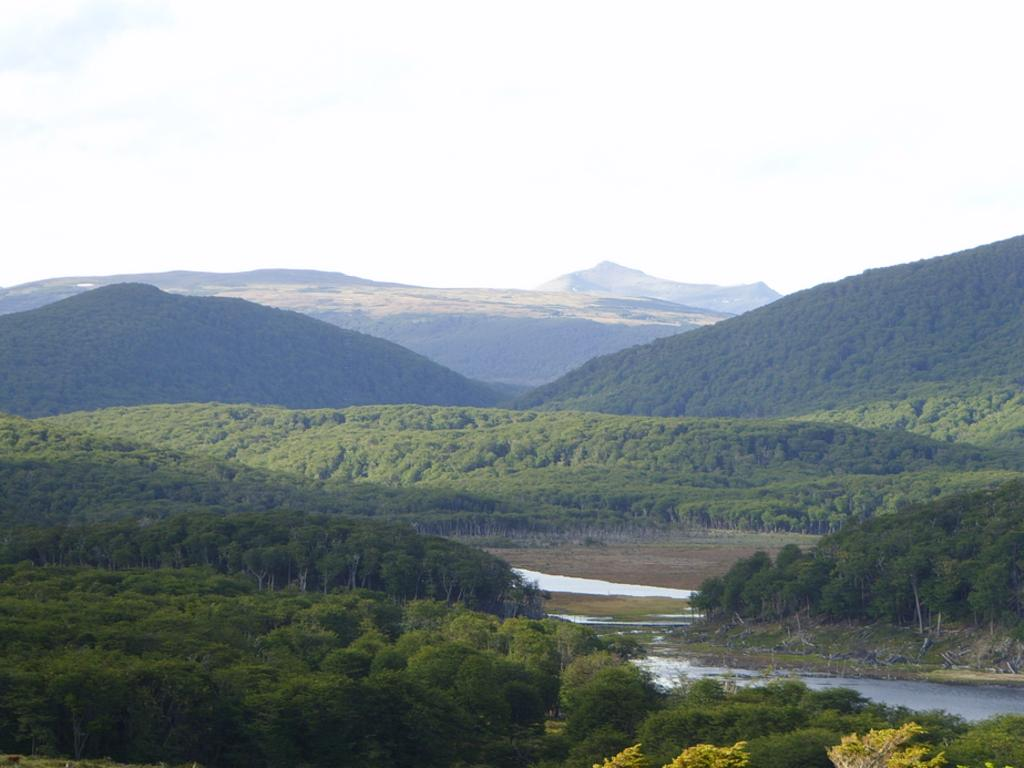
Valley near the Beagle Channel (2009)

The Tierra del Fuego region has a subpolar oceanic climate (Köppen climate classification Cfc) with short, cool summers and long, wet, moderately mild winters: the precipitation averages 3,000 mm (118 in) a year in the far west, but precipitation decreases rapidly towards the eastern side. Temperatures are steady throughout the year: in Ushuaia they hardly surpass 9 °C (48 °F) in summers and average 0 °C (32 °F) in winters. Snowfall can occur in summer. The cold and wet summers help preserve the ancient glaciers. The southernmost islands possess a sub-antarctic climate typical of tundra that makes the growth of trees impossible. Some areas in the interior have a polar climate. Regions in the world with similar climates to southern Tierra del Fuego are: the Aleutian Islands, Iceland, the Alaska Peninsula, the Faroe Islands, Macquarie Island, and the Heard and McDonald Islands.

=== Flora ===
Only 30% of the islands have forests, which are classified as Magellanic subpolar. The northeastern portion of the region is made up of steppe and cool semi-desert.

Six species of tree are found in Tierra del Fuego: canelo or winter's bark (Drimys winteri); Maytenus magellanica; Pilgerodendron uviferum, the southernmost conifer in the world; and three kinds of southern beech: Nothofagus antarctica; Nothofagus pumilio; and the evergreen Nothofagus betuloides. Several kinds of fruit grow in open spaces in these forests, such as beach strawberry (Fragaria chiloensis var. chiloensis forma chiloensis) and calafate (Berberis buxifolia), which have long been gathered by both Native Americans and residents of European descent.

They are the only forests in the world to have developed in a climate with such cold summers. Tree cover extends very close to the southernmost tip of South America. Winds are so strong that trees in wind-exposed areas grow into twisted shapes, inspiring people to call them "flag-trees". Tree vegetation extends to the southern tip of the region, Isla Hornos, although the Wollaston Islands are mostly covered by subantarctic tundra except in wind sheltered areas where the trees can survive.

Flora in Tierra del Fuego

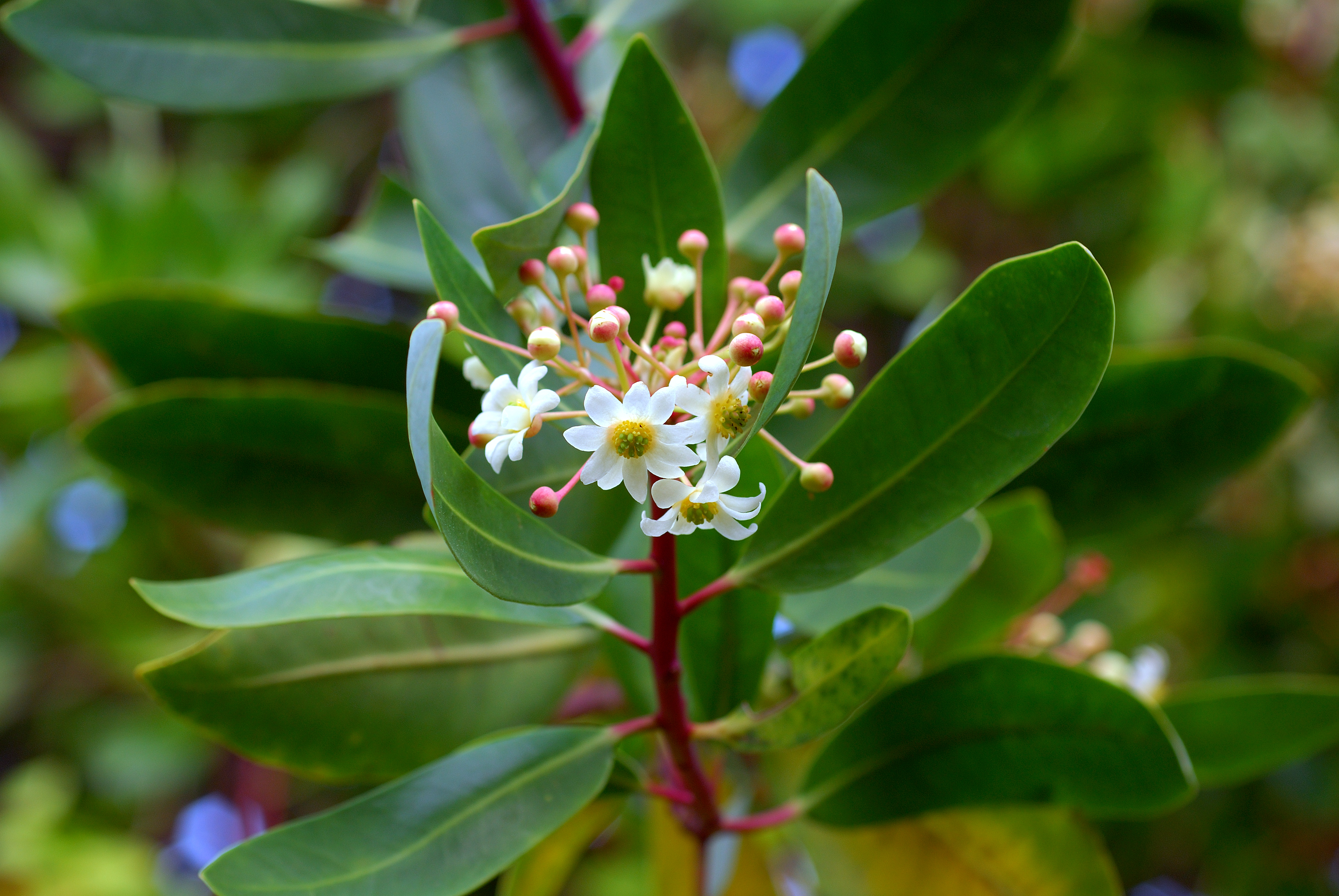
Drimys winteri flowers

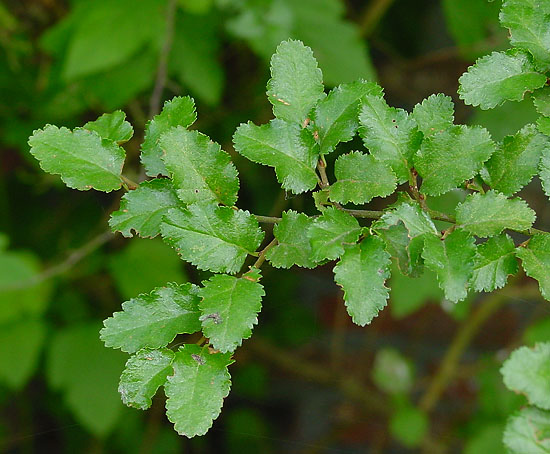
Nothofagus antarctica

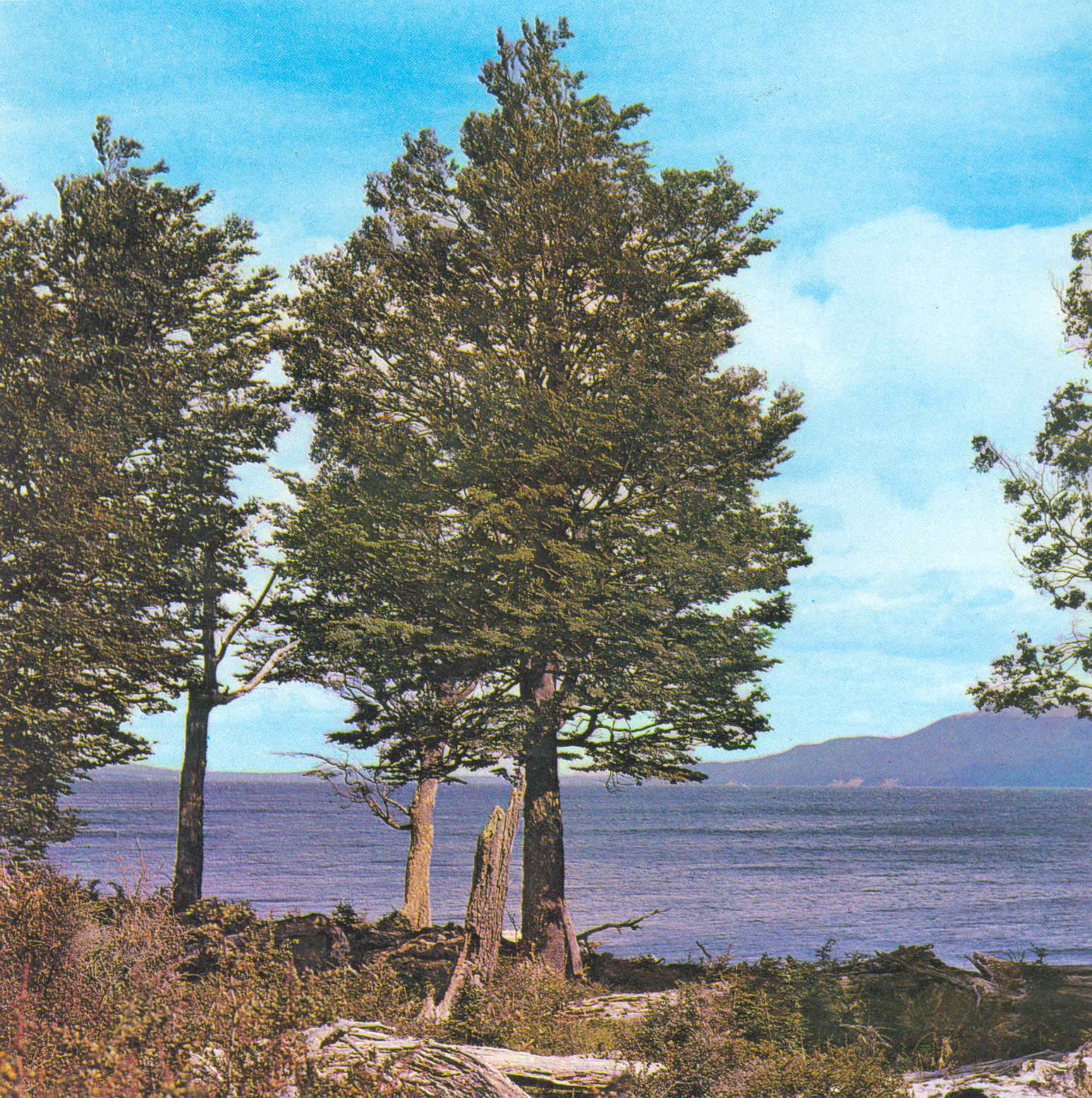
Nothofagus pumilio

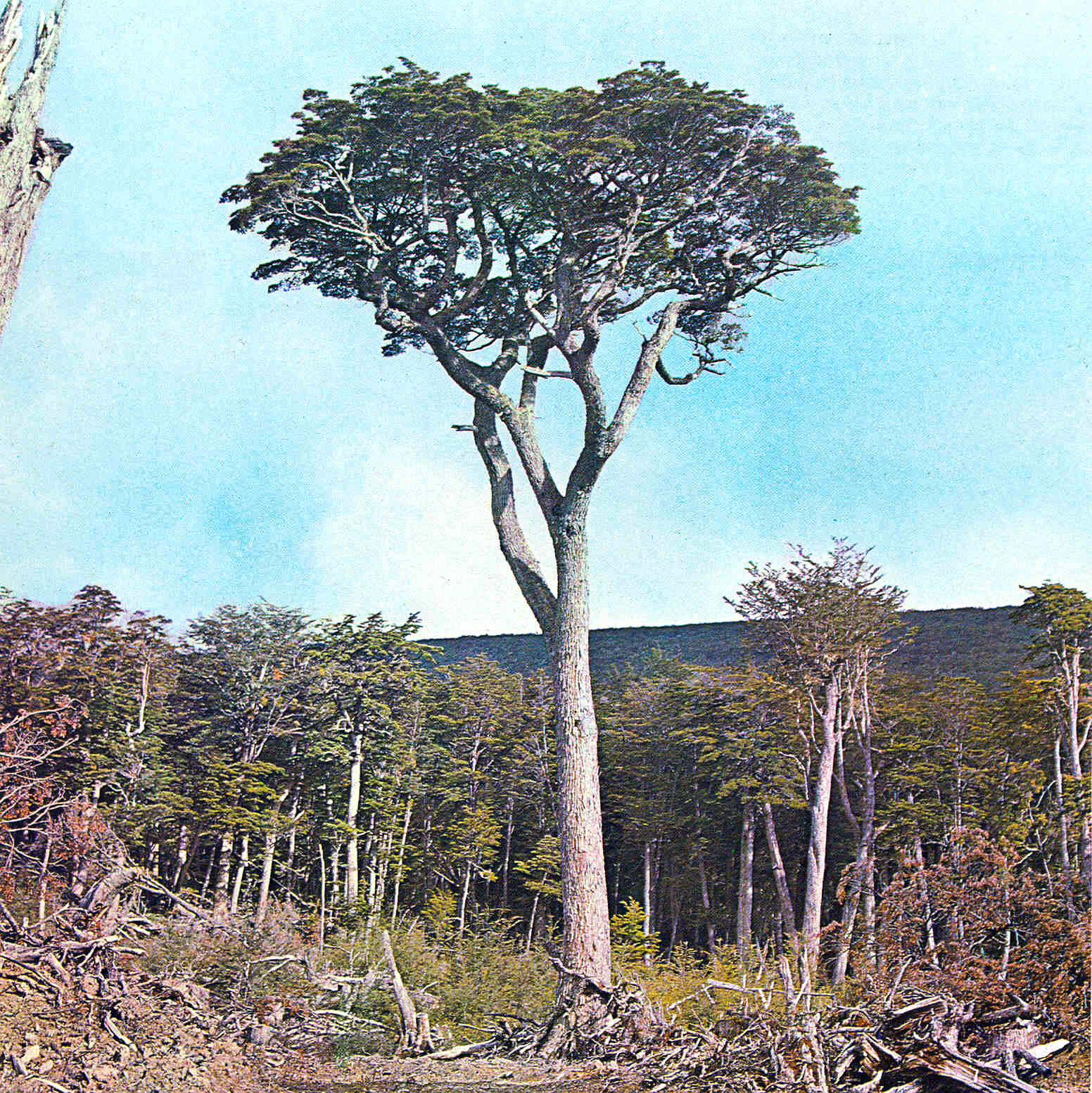
Nothofagus betuloides

Forests from Tierra del Fuego have expanded beyond local importance. These forests have been a source of trees that have been transplanted abroad in places with similar climate, but which originally were devoid of trees, such as the Faroe Islands and nearby archipelagos. Most species were gathered from the coldest places in Tierra del Fuego, mainly sites with tundra borders. This effort resulted in positive changes, as the heavy winds and cool summers in the Faroe Islands did not allow the growth of trees from other regions in the world. The imported trees are used ornamentally, as curtains against wind, and to fight erosion caused by storms and grazing in the Faroe Islands.

=== Fauna ===
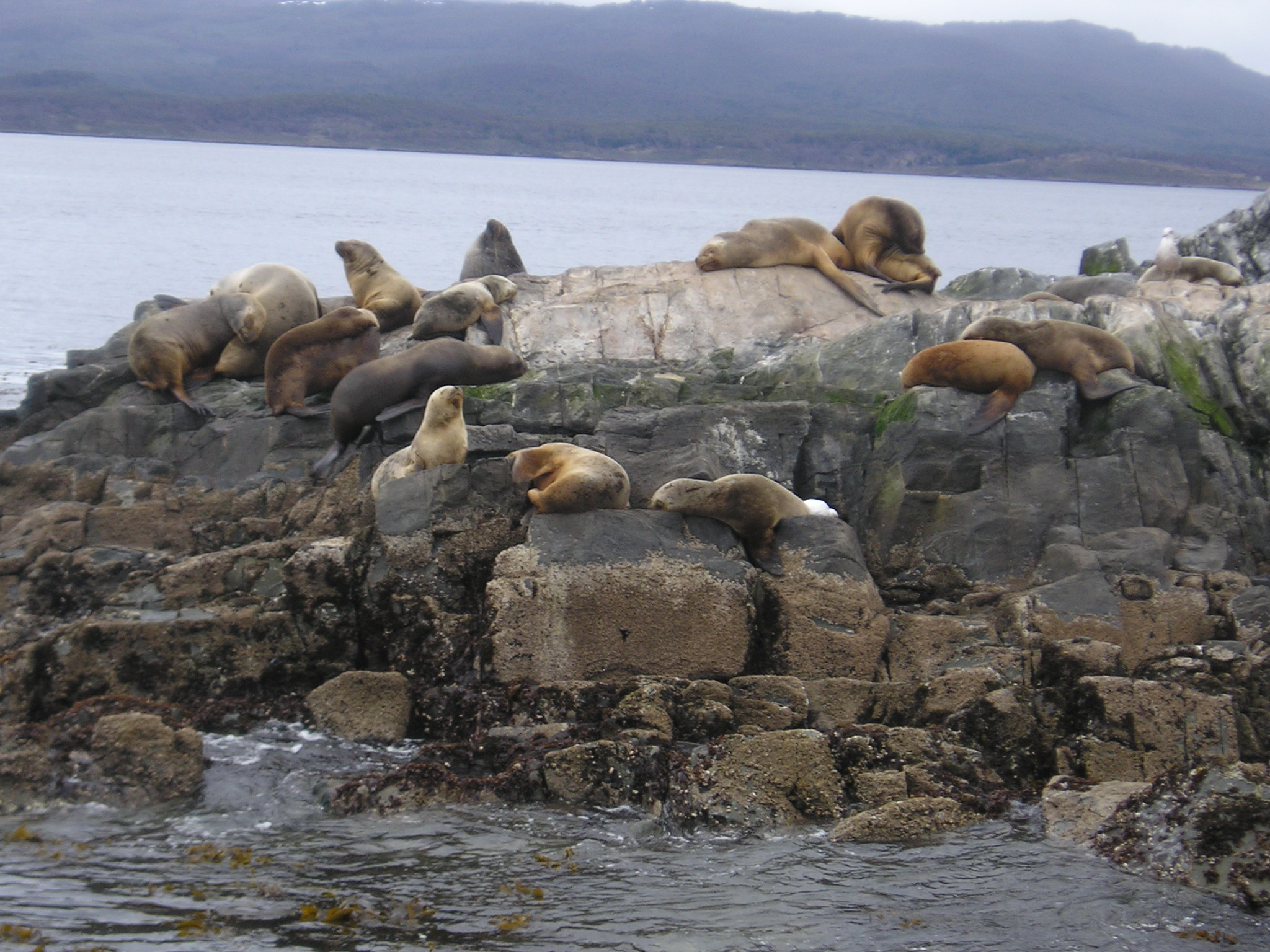
Sea lions at Isla de los Lobos in the Beagle Channel, near Ushuaia (2006)

Among the most notable animals in the archipelago are austral parakeets, gulls, guanacos, South American foxes, kingfishers, Andean condors, king penguins, owls, and firecrown hummingbirds. Isla Grande de Tierra del Fuego is also home to the lizard with the world's southernmost distribution, Liolaemus magellanicus.

North American beavers, introduced during the 1940s, have proliferated and caused considerable damage to the island forests. The governments have established a wide-reaching program to trap and kill beavers in Tierra del Fuego.

Like the mainland of Chile and Argentina to the north, this archipelago boasts some of the finest trout fishing in the world. Sea-run brown trout often exceed 9 kg (20 lb), particularly in rivers such as the Rio Grande and the San Pablo, and in the Lago Fagnano.

Waters adjacent to Tierra del Fuego are very rich in cetacean diversity. Sightings of southern right whales in Tierra del Fuego have increased in the 2000s, humpbacks, and some others such as blue whales, southern fins, southern seis, and southern minkes. Beagle Channel is a prominent area to watch rare, endemic dolphins, and the less-studied pygmy right whales.

Pinnipeds inhabiting the areas include South American sea lions (Otaria flavescens), South American fur seals (Arctophoca australis), the carnivorous and seal-eating leopard seals (Hydrurga leptonyx), and gigantic southern elephant seals (Mirounga leonine) – the largest extant marine mammal that is not a cetacean.

=== Islands ===
The following table lists islands over 1 km^{2}. Area figures are from the USGS unless otherwise specified.

Island	Area (km^{2})	Group
Isla Grande	47,369.9	main island
Hoste Island	4,261.4	
Santa Inés Island	2,734.5	
Navarino Island	2,519.7	
Dawson Island	1,523.1	
Desolación Island	1,367.0	
Aracena Island	1,291.8	
Clarence Island	1,165.2	
Londonderry Island	631.5	
Gordon Island	618.1	
Isla de los Estados	485.0	
Guardián Brito Island	218.9	
Wollaston Island	214.4	Wollaston Islands
Lennox Island	148.0	Picton, Lennox and Nueva
O'Brien Island	142.0	
Hermite Island	137.6	Hermite Islands
Nueva Island	110.9	Picton, Lennox and Nueva
Picton Island	88.1	Picton, Lennox and Nueva
Hevia Island	79.5	
Carlos III Island	69.7	
Recalada Island	69.4	
Cook Island	68.9	
Grevy Island	65.3	Wollaston Islands
Herschel Island	62.4	Hermite Islands
Bayly Island	43.8	Wollaston Islands
Deceit Island	36.9	Hermite Islands
Hornos Island	24.5	Hermite Islands
Gable Island	21.7	
Freycinet Island	18.2	Wollaston Islands
Adriana Island	18.2	Wollaston Islands
Jerdan Island	4.9	Hermite Islands
Hall Island	2.6	Hermite Islands
Barnevelt Island	1.6	
Maxwell Island	1.4	Hermite Islands
Evout Island	1.3	
Middle Island	1.2	Wollaston Islands
Otarie Island	1.0	Wollaston Islands

== Economy ==
Today, the main economic activities of the archipelago are fishing, extraction of natural gas and oil, sheep farming, and ecotourism. Tourism is gaining increasing importance as it attracts numerous upmarket visitors. Much of the tourism is based on "southernmost" claims: for example, both Ushuaia and Puerto Williams claim to be the "southernmost city in the world". On the Argentine side of Tierra del Fuego, the government has promoted the establishment of several electronic companies via tax exemptions, particularly in the city of Río Grande.

Energy production is a crucial economic activity. On the Argentine side of Tierra del Fuego during the period 2005–2010, petroleum and natural gas extraction contributed 20% of the region's economic output.

== Cultural depictions ==
- Alexander Buchan participated in the 1768–1771 first voyage of James Cook aboard HMS Endeavour, where he was one of the artists in the entourage of botanist Joseph Banks. Endeavour lay at anchor in the Bay of Good Success on 15 January 1769. He took part in an expedition which started from here.
- As a ship painter, Conrad Martens drew and created watercolour paintings in 1833 and 1834 during the second voyage of HMS Beagle in Tierra del Fuego.
- The French painter and lithographer Évremond de Bérard illustrated the travel journal "Le Tour du Monde" with Tierra del Fuego motifs in 1861.
- Rockwell Kent painted "more than twenty large pictures of Tierra del Fuego" during his stay there in 1922 and 1923, as he reported in his autobiography It's Me O Lord: The Autobiography of Rockwell Kent.
- The German painter Ingo Kühl travelled three times to Tierra del Fuego, where he created paintings in a cycle entitled Landscapes of the End of the World (2005).
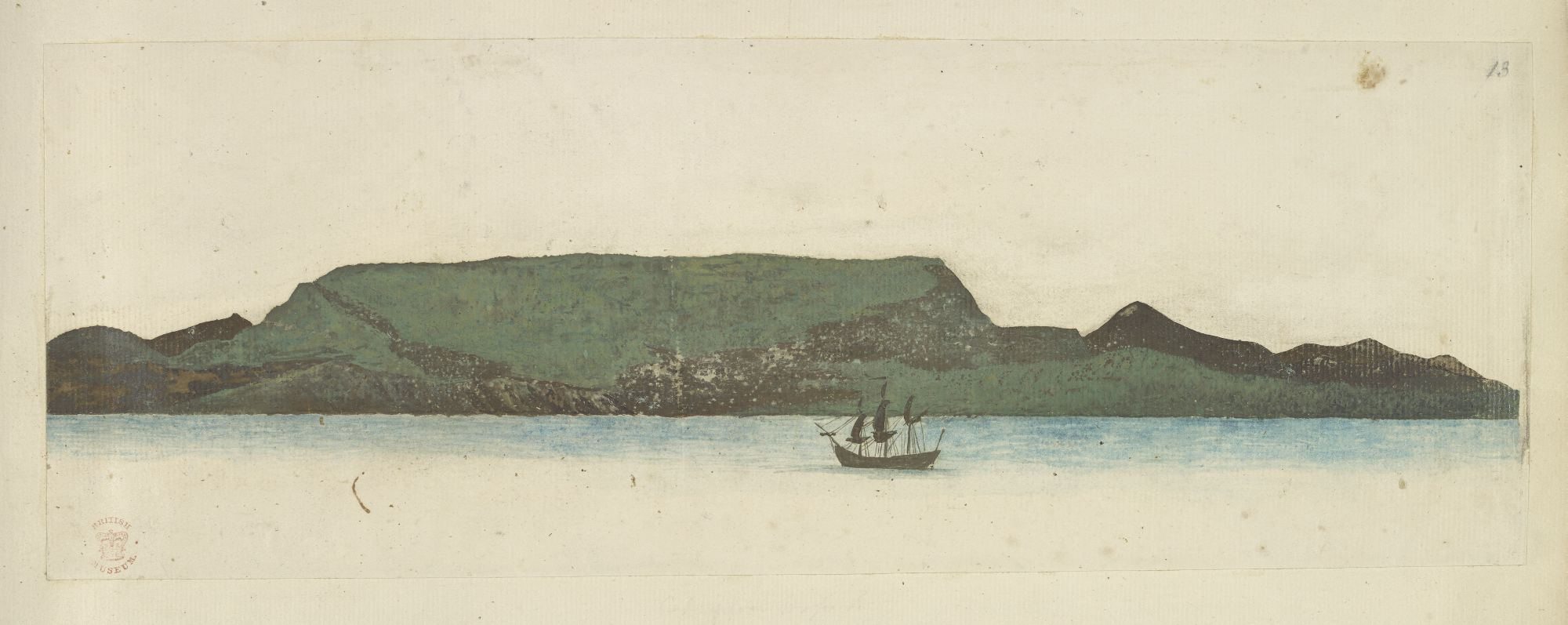
Alexander Buchan HMS Endeavour on 12 January 1769, off the coast of Tierra del Fuego

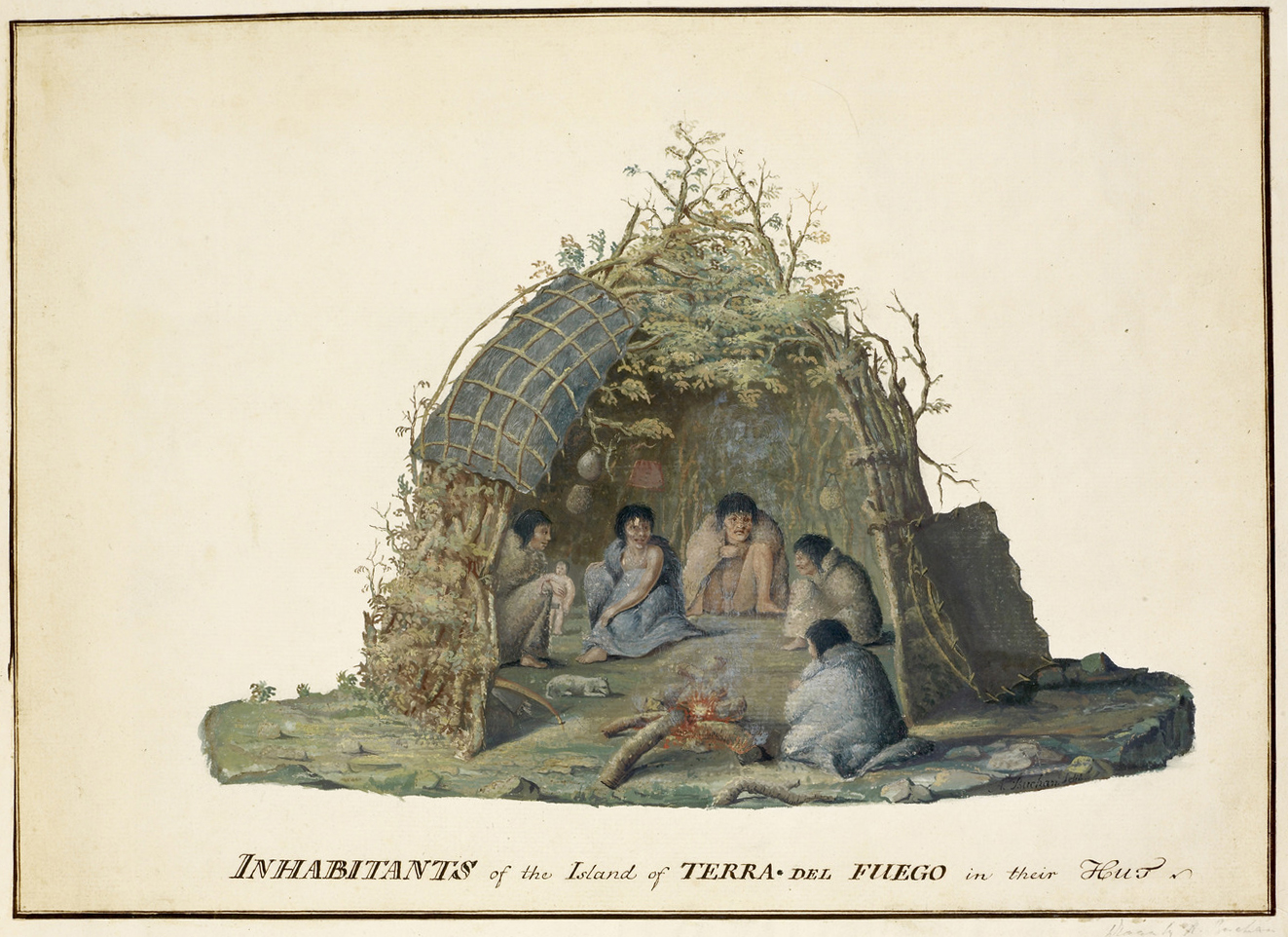
Alexander Buchan Inhabitants of Tierra del Fuego, 1769

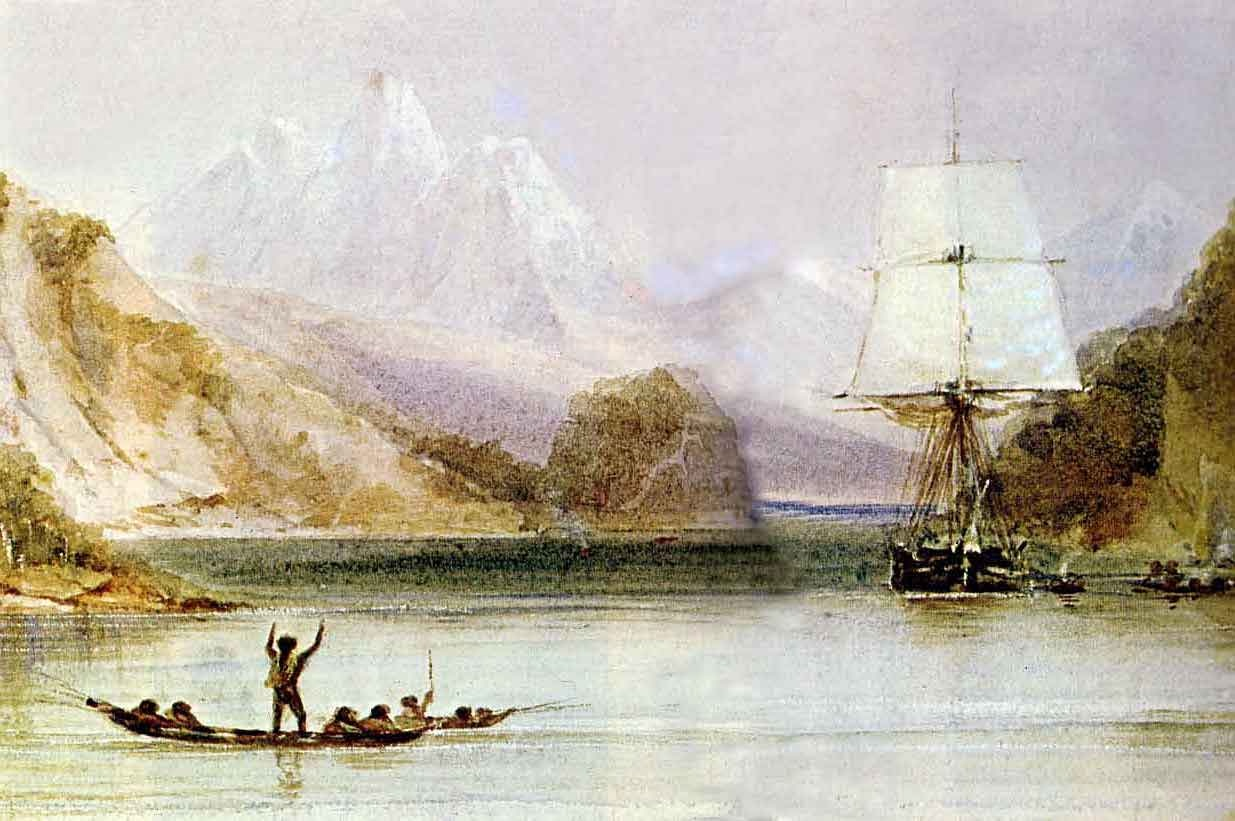
Conrad Martens HMS Beagle in Tierra del Fuego, between 1832 and 1836

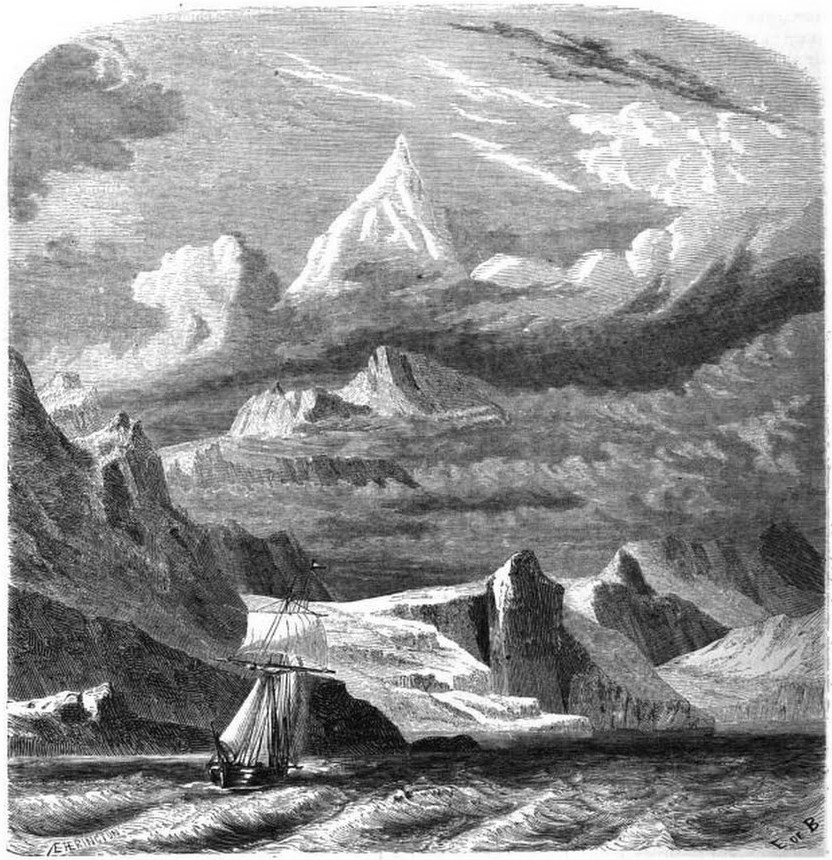
Évremond de Bérard Tierra del Fuego, Monte Sarmiento seen from Froward Cape, 1861

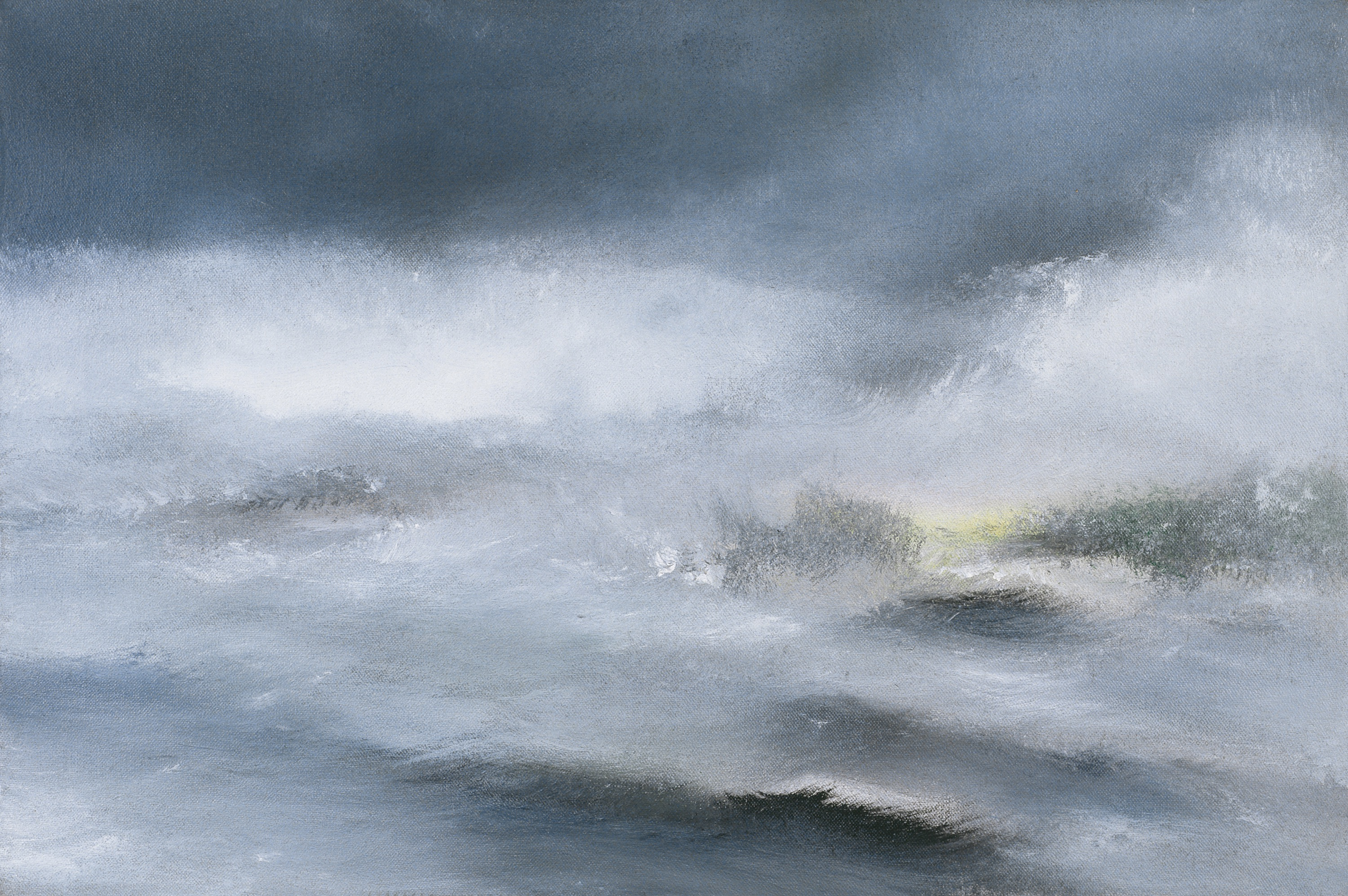
Ingo Kühl Glacier (Beagle Channel), 2005 painted in Punta Arenas

== See also ==
- Alberto de Agostini National Park
- Beagle conflict
- Beaver eradication in Tierra del Fuego
- Mamihlapinatapai
- The Voyage of the Beagle
- Tierra del Fuego National Park
- Yahgan language
