= Darwin Sound =

Coordinates: 54°52′59″S 70°04′59″W

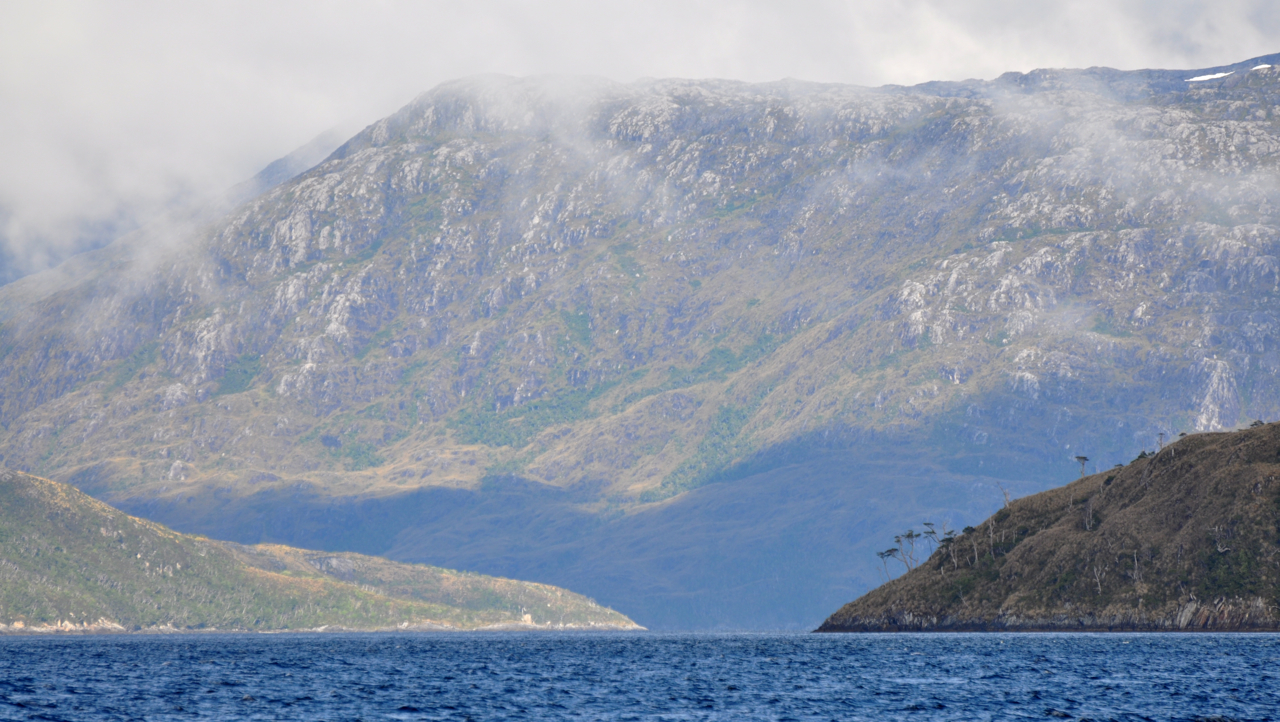
Paso Darwin

The Darwin Sound is an expanse of seawater which forms a westward continuation of the Beagle Channel and links it to the Pacific Ocean at Londonderry Island and Stewart Island, not far from the southern tip of South America. It thus forms a navigable link across Tierra del Fuego between the Pacific and Atlantic Oceans as an alternative to going round the hazardous rocky headland of Cape Horn.

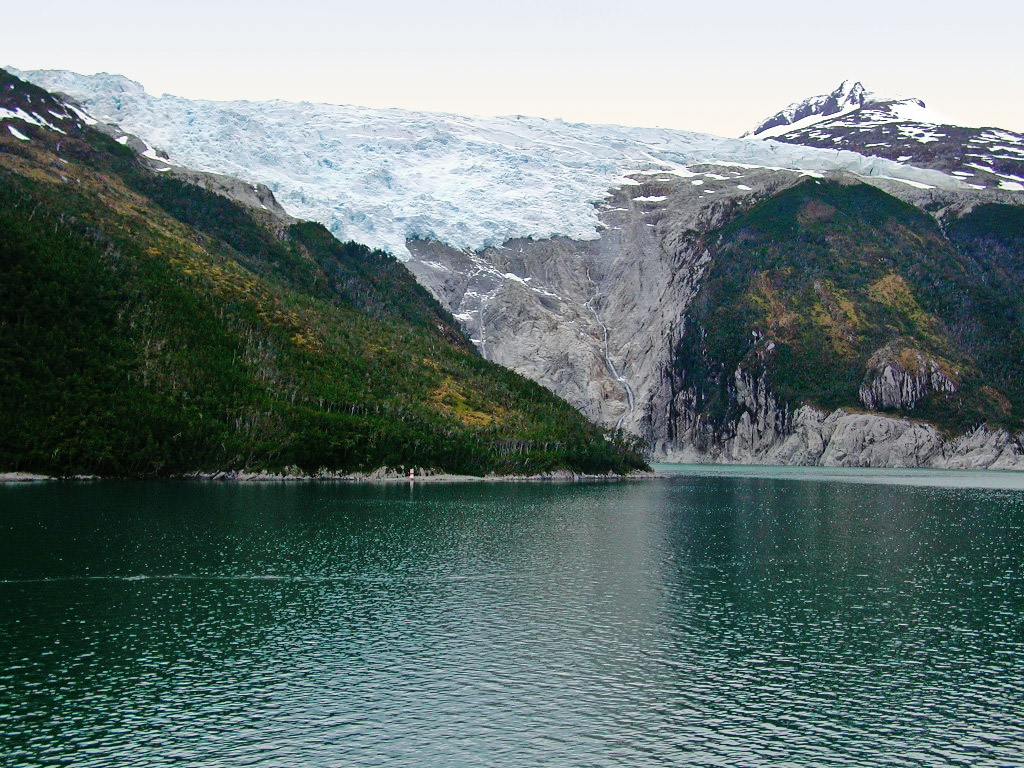
A glacier on the north shore of the Beagle Channel, similar to the glacier near the Darwin Sound that led to its naming

It was given the name Darwin Sound during the Voyage of the Beagle by HMS Beagle's captain Robert FitzRoy after Charles Darwin's prompt action, with others, saved them from being marooned. To carry out their hydrographic survey work the ship's boats were often used at a considerable distance from the ship. In the Beagle Channel they looked at its north shore in amazement at the vast "beryl blue" glaciers on the steep mountains of the Cordillera of the Andes, which fed down to the water and formed icebergs. On 29 January 1833 they had their boats drawn up on the beach about half a mile (1 km) from the ship and were dining when a huge mass of ice fell from the face of a glacier and plunged into the water with a "thundering crash". "Great rolling waves" rushed toward the shore threatening the small boats. Darwin was quick to act. He rushed down to the shore with two or three of the men and they hauled the boats to safety just as the first breaker crashed down, at considerable danger to themselves. Captain Fitzroy was impressed and next day named a nearby expanse of water Darwin Sound. Darwin felt that he had acted out of fear rather than bravado, noting in his Diary that, had they lost the boats, "how dangerous would our lot have been, surrounded... by hostile Savages & deprived of... provisions."

The highest peak to the north of the Channel was named Mount Darwin by FitzRoy to celebrate Darwin's 25th birthday on 12 February 1834.
