= Beagle Channel =

Strait in Tierra del Fuego

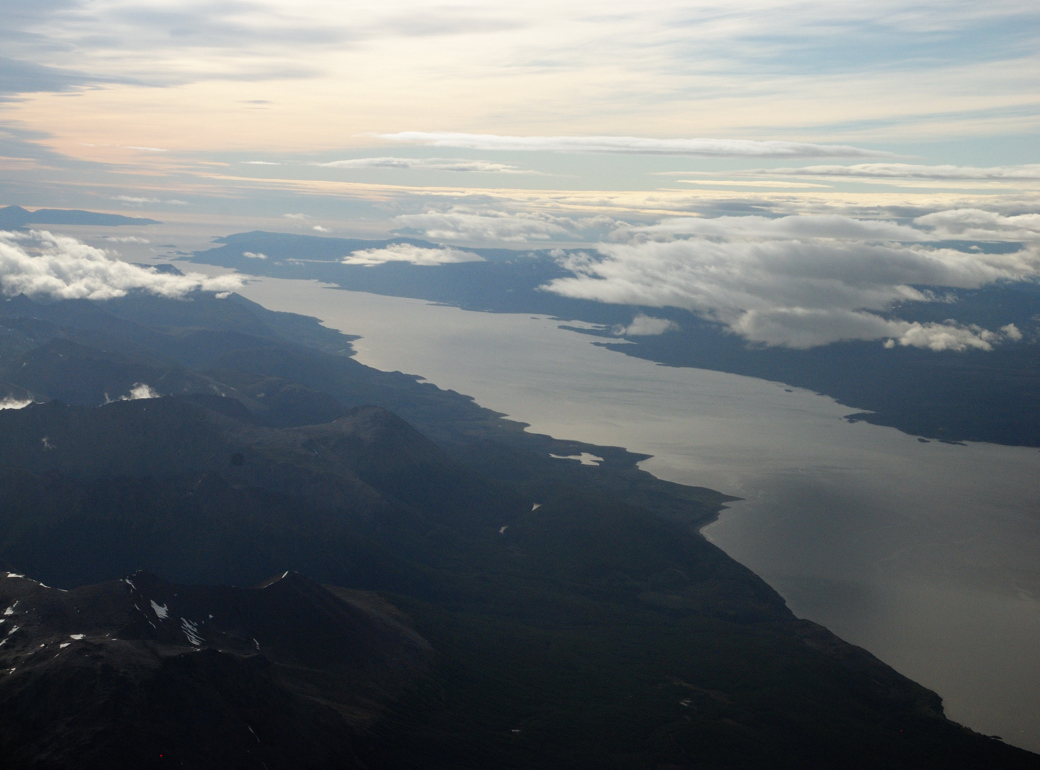
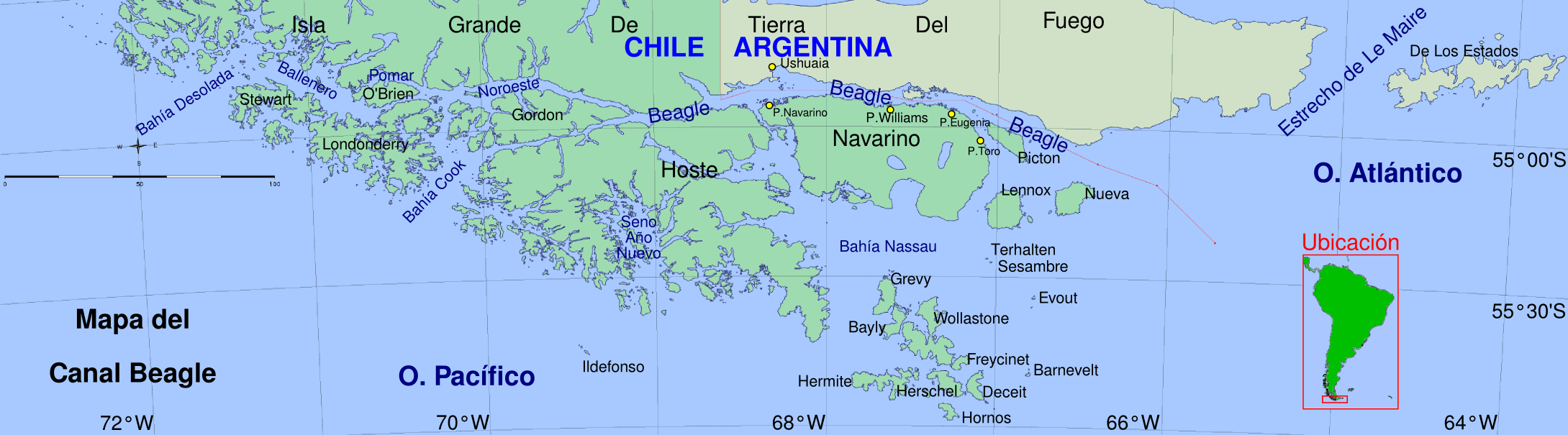
- Partial aerial view of Beagle Channel. The Chilean Navarino Island is seen in the top-right while the Argentine part of Isla Grande de Tierra del Fuego is seen at the bottom-left. Beagle Channel, from the Pacific to the Atlantic Ocean.

- Location within Chile Location within Argentina Location within South America
- Interactive map of Beagle Channel
- Location: Pacific Oceans–Atlantic Ocean
- Coordinates: 54°52′32″S 68°08′11″W
- Type: Strait
- Basin countries: Chile; Argentina
- Max. length: 150 miles (240 km)
- Min. width: 3 miles (4.8 km)
- Settlements: Ushuaia, Argentina; Puerto Williams, Chile

The Beagle Channel (Spanish: Canal del Beagle; Yahgan: Onašaga) is a strait in the Tierra del Fuego Archipelago, on the extreme southern tip of South America between Chile and Argentina. The channel separates the larger main island of Isla Grande de Tierra del Fuego from various smaller islands including the islands of Picton, Lennox and Nueva; Navarino; Hoste; Londonderry; and Stewart. The channel's eastern area forms part of the border between Chile and Argentina and the western area is entirely within Chile.

The Beagle Channel, the Straits of Magellan to the north, and the open-ocean Drake Passage to the south are the three navigable passages around South America between the Pacific and Atlantic Oceans.

The Beagle Channel is about 240 kilometres (130 nmi; 150 mi) long and 5 kilometres (3 nmi; 3 mi) wide at its narrowest point. It extends from Nueva Island in the east to Darwin Sound and Cook Bay in the Pacific Ocean in the west. Some 50 kilometres (27 nmi; 31 mi) from its western end, it divides into two branches, north and south of Gordon Island. The southwest branch between Hoste Island and Gordon Island enters Cook Bay. The northwest branch between Gordon Island and Isla Grande enters Darwin Sound, which connects to the Pacific Ocean by the O'Brien and Ballenero channels. The biggest settlement on the channel is Ushuaia in Argentina followed by Puerto Williams in Chile. These are amongst the southernmost settlements in the world.

== Navigation ==
Although it is navigable by large ships, there are safer waters to the south (Drake Passage) and to the north (Strait of Magellan). Under the Treaty of Peace and Friendship of 1984 between Chile and Argentina, ships of other nations navigate with a Chilean pilot between the Strait of Magellan and Ushuaia through the Magdalena Channel and the Cockburn Channel to the Pacific Ocean, then by the Ballenero Channel, the O'Brien Channel and the northwest branch of the Beagle Channel.

== Islands ==
The Beagle Channel is between islands covering a much larger area; to the north lies Argentine-Chilean Isla Grande de Tierra del Fuego, to the south Hoste, Navarino, and Picton and Nueva, which were claimed by Argentina until 1984. The latter two lie at the bi-national eastern entrance to the channel while the western entrance is wholly inside Chile. The western entrance of Beagle Channel is divided by Gordon Island into two channels. Some minor islands exist inside the channel among them Snipe Islet and Gable Island. Except for eastern Isla Grande de Tierra del Fuego and Gable Island all islands mentioned here belong to Chile.

== History ==
The Yaghan peoples settled the islands along the Murray Channel, which connects to the southern side of the Beagle Channel, approximately 10,000 years before present. There are notable archaeological sites indicating such early Yaghan settlement at locations such as Bahia Wulaia on Isla Navarino, site of the Bahia Wulaia Dome Middens.

=== Mythology ===
According to a Selkʼnam myth, the channel was created alongside the Strait of Magellan and Fagnano Lake in places where slingshots fell on earth during Taiyín's fight with a witch who was said to have "retained the waters and the foods".

=== Naming and Darwin visit ===
The channel was named after the ship HMS Beagle during its first hydrographic survey of the coasts of the southern part of South America which lasted from 1826 to 1830. During that expedition, under the overall command of Commander Phillip Parker King, the Beagle's captain Pringle Stokes committed suicide and was replaced by captain Robert FitzRoy. The ship continued the survey in the second voyage of Beagle under the command of captain FitzRoy, who took Charles Darwin along as a self-funding supernumerary, giving him opportunities as an amateur naturalist. Darwin had his first sight of glaciers when they reached the channel on 29 January 1833, and wrote in his field notebook "It is scarcely possible to imagine anything more beautiful than the beryl-like blue of these glaciers, and especially as contrasted with the dead white of the upper expanse of snow."

=== Beagle conflict ===
Several small islands (Picton, Lennox and Nueva) up to the Cape Horn were the subject of the long-running Beagle conflict between Chile and Argentina. From the 1950s to 1970s several incidents involving the Chilean and Argentine navies occurred in the waters of the Beagle Channel, for example the 1958 Snipe incident, the 1967 Cruz del Sur incident and the shelling of Quidora the same year. See List of incidents during the Beagle conflict. By the terms of a Treaty of Peace and Friendship of 1984 between Chile and Argentina the islands are now part of Chile.

=== Beagle Channel in the Fine Arts ===
As a ship's painter, Conrad Martens drew and created watercolour paintings in 1833 and 1834 during the second voyage of HMS Beagle in Tierra del Fuego.

The German painter Ingo Kühl traveled three times to the Beagle Channel, where he created paintings on board a sailing yacht.

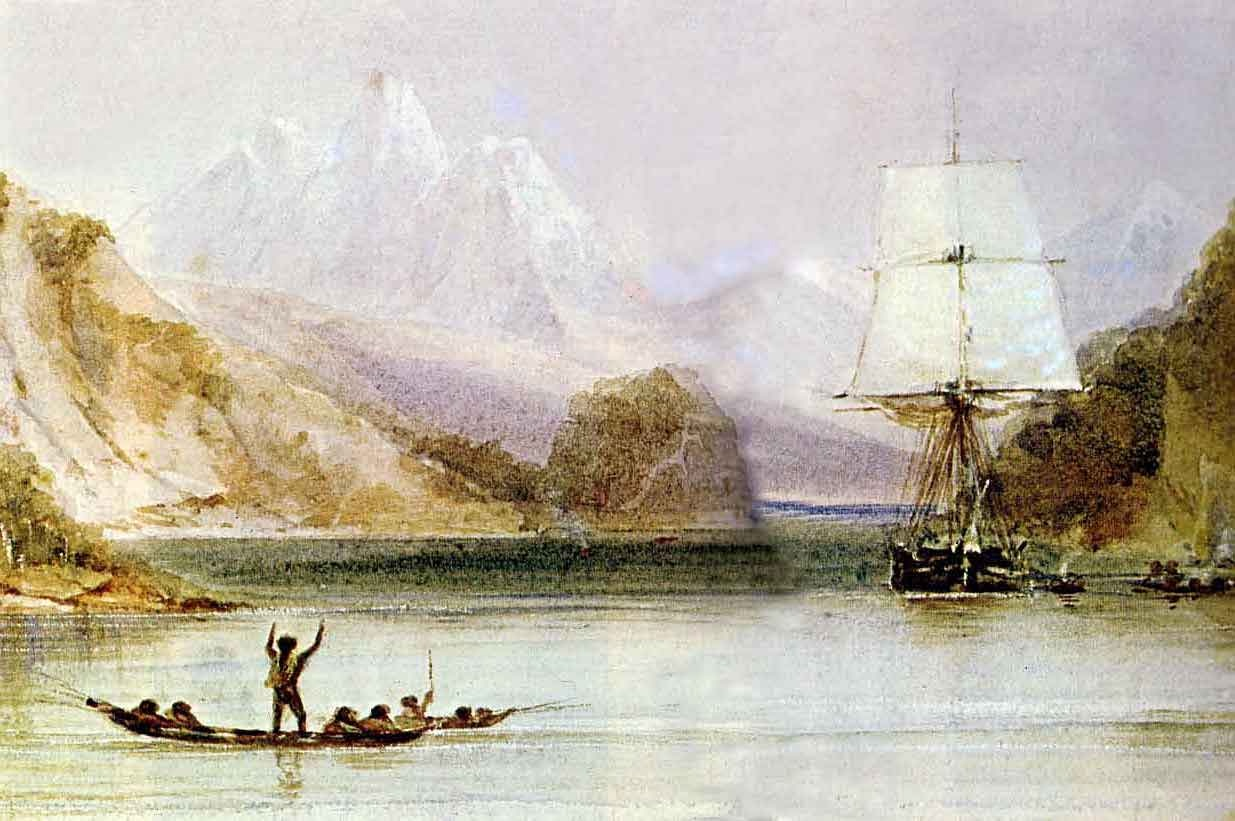
HMS Beagle at Ponsonby Sound in the Beagle Channel, by the ship's artist Conrad Martens.

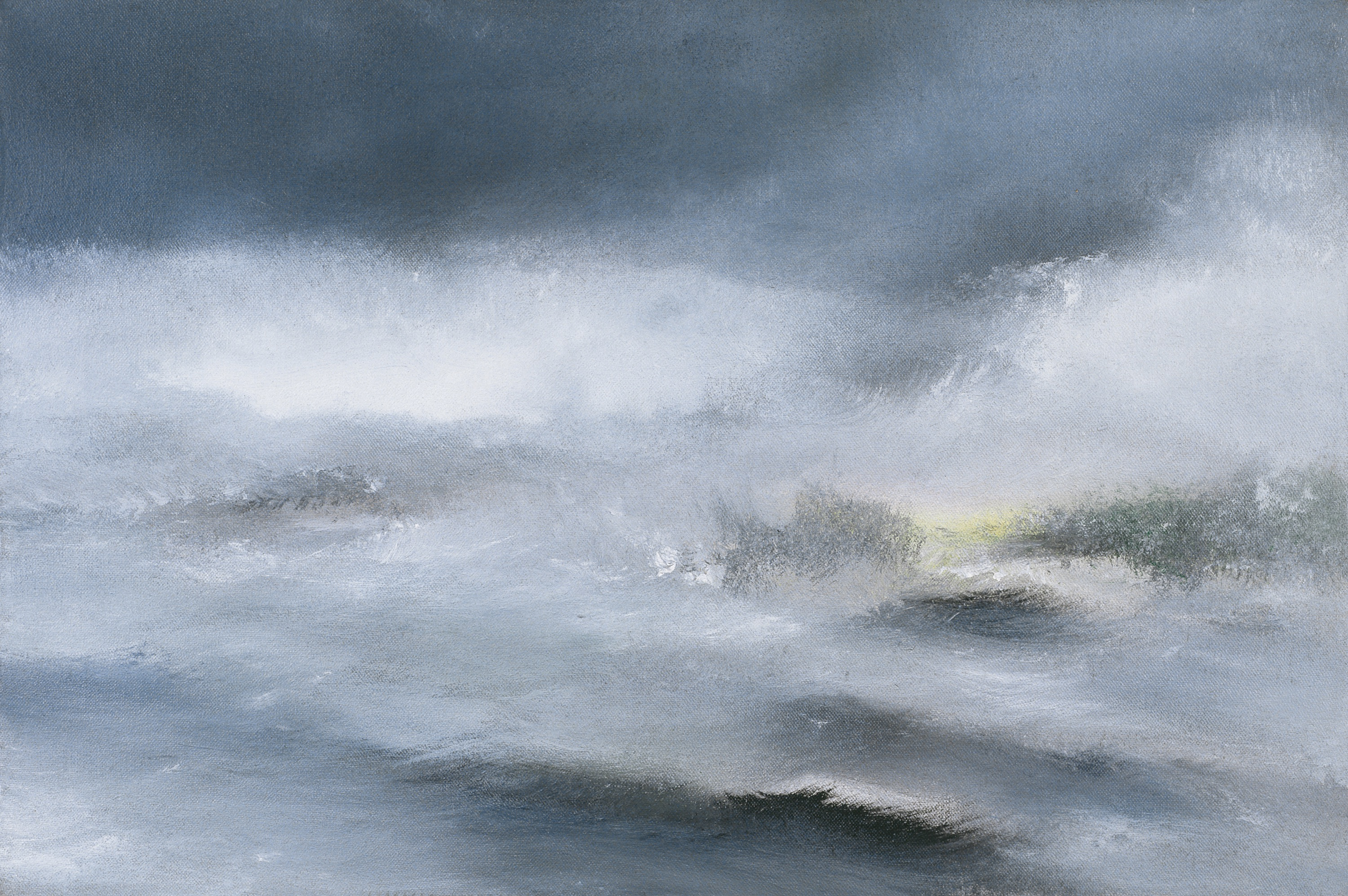
Glacier (Beagle Channel), painted by Ingo Kühl (2005).

== Fauna ==
Beagle Channel is a prominent area to watch rare species of dolphins. Wildlife seen in the channel include:

Mammals:

- South American sea lion
- South American fur seal
- Peale's dolphin (endemic to Patagonia)
- Dusky dolphin
- Commerson's dolphin
- Risso's dolphin
- Burmeister's porpoise
- spectacled porpoise

Birds:

- Magellanic penguin
- southern rockhopper penguin
- upland goose
- kelp goose
- crested duck
- great grebe
- flying steamerduck
- flightless steamerduck
- black-faced ibis
- black-crowned night-heron
- imperial shag
- rock shag
- Neotropic cormorant
- black-chested buzzard-eagle
- turkey vulture
- Andean condor
- crested caracara
- chimango caracara
- white-throated caracara
- striated caracara
- Magellanic oystercatcher
- blackish oystercatcher
- southern lapwing
- rufous-chested plover
- Baird's sandpiper
- white-rumped sandpiper
- brown-hooded gull
- dolphin gull
- South American tern
- kelp gull
- Chilean skua
- Magellanic diving-petrel
- common diving-petrel

== Gallery ==
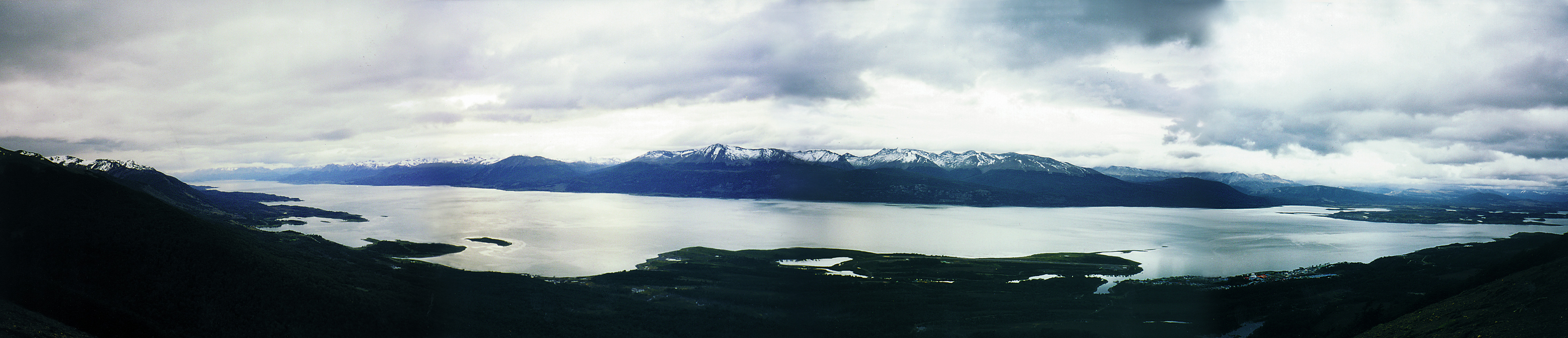
Beagle Channel seen from above Puerto Williams

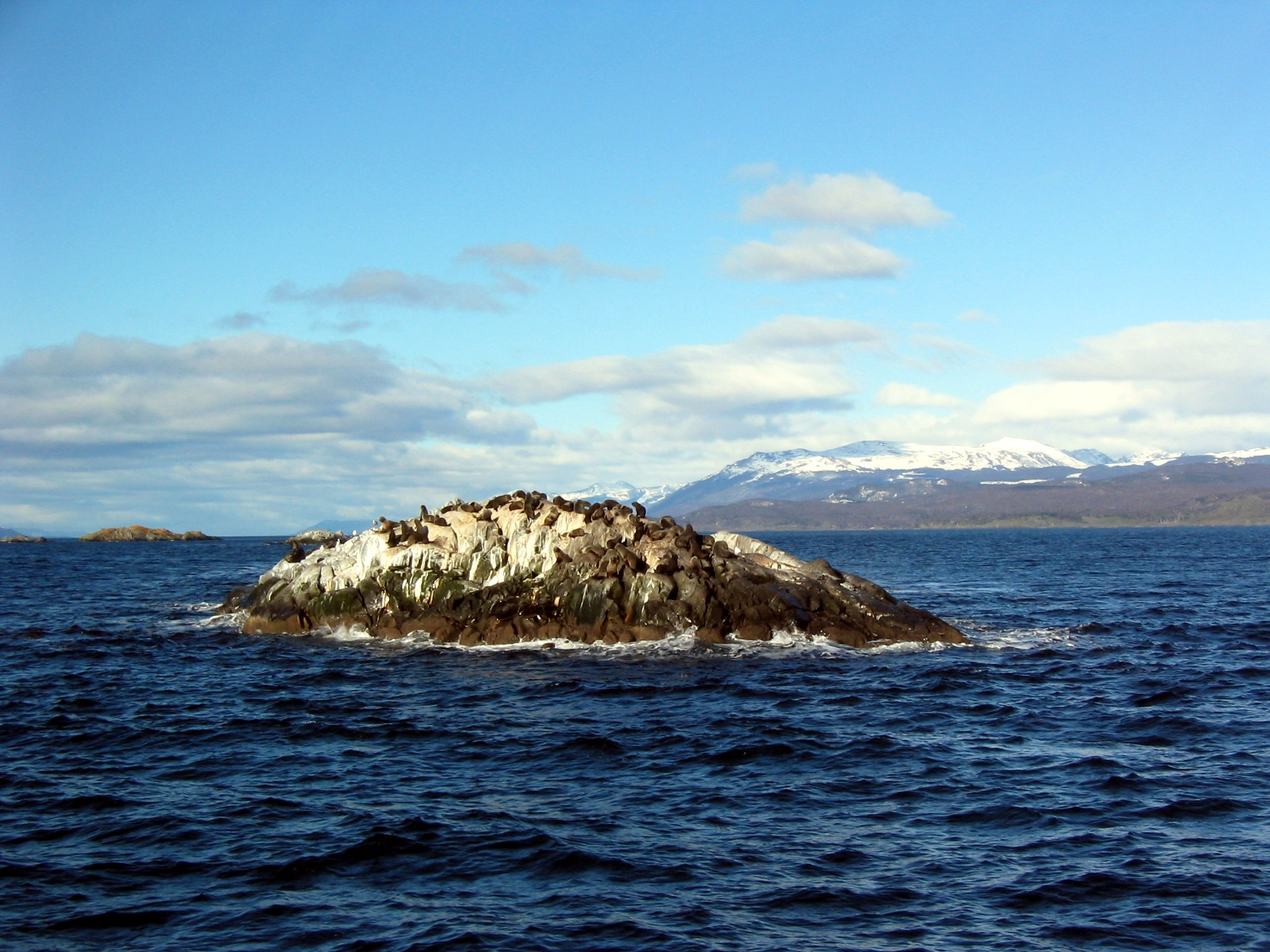
Sea Lions Island or La Isla de Los Lobos

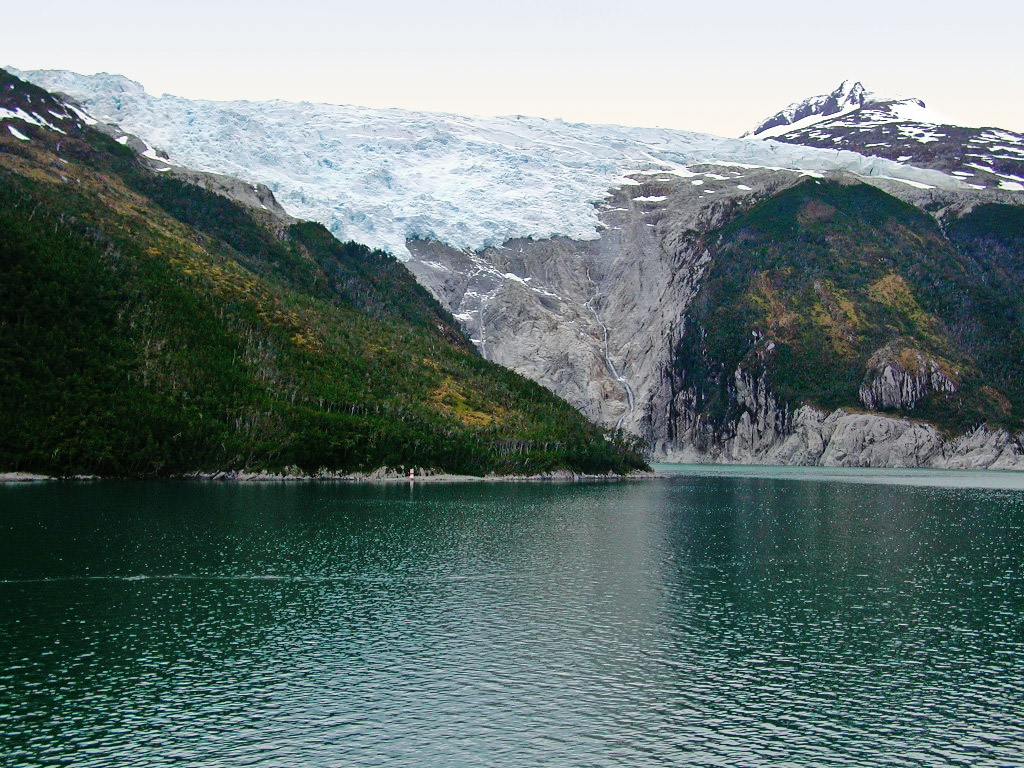
Romanche Glacier on the north shore of the channel

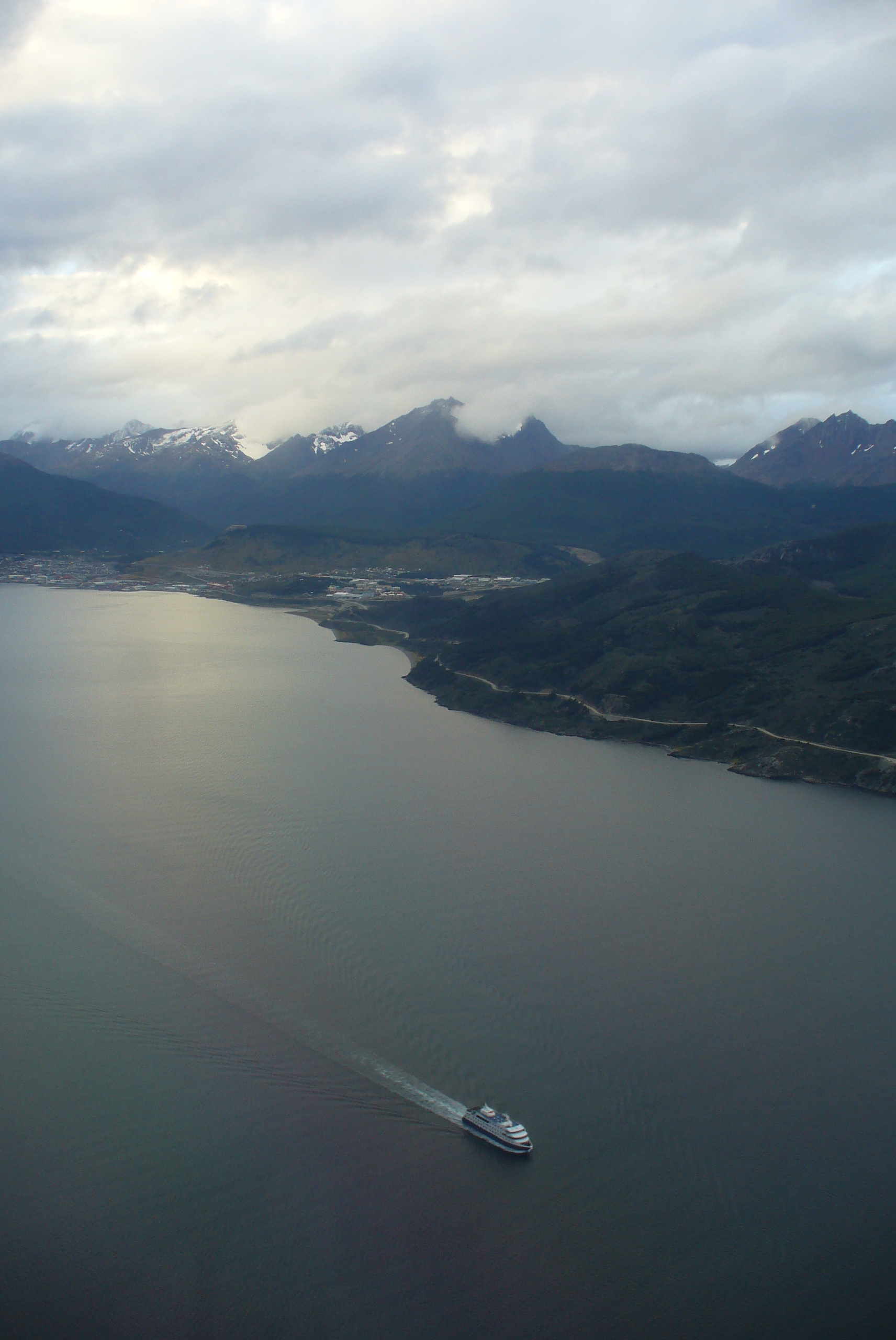
Beagle Channel, January 2006

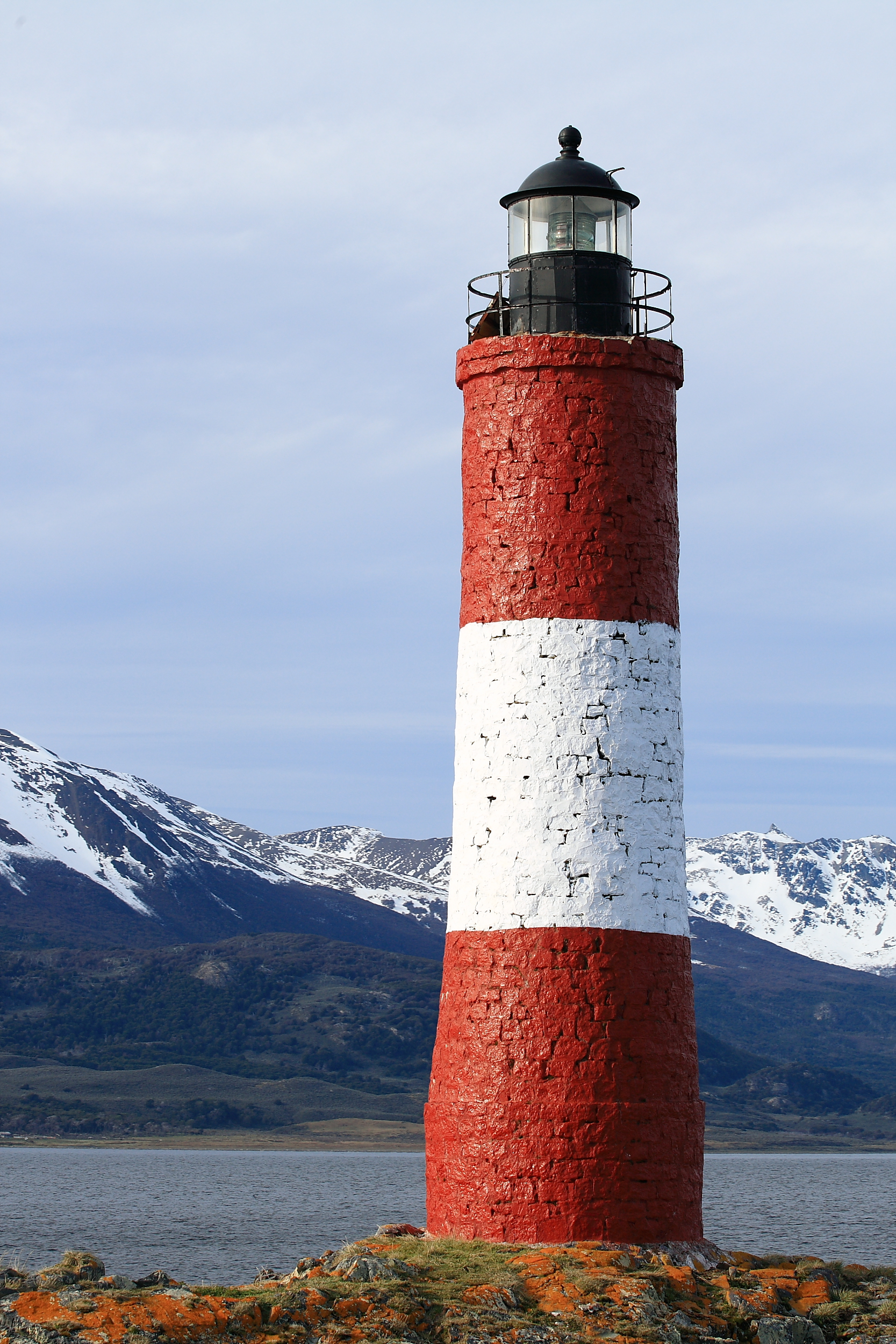
View of The Lighthouse Les Eclaireurs called End of the World near Ushuaia on the north shore of the channel

== See also ==
- Beagle conflict
- Beagle Channel cartography since 1881
