= Ballenero Channel =

Strait in Chile

Coordinates: 54.768049°S 71.240152°W

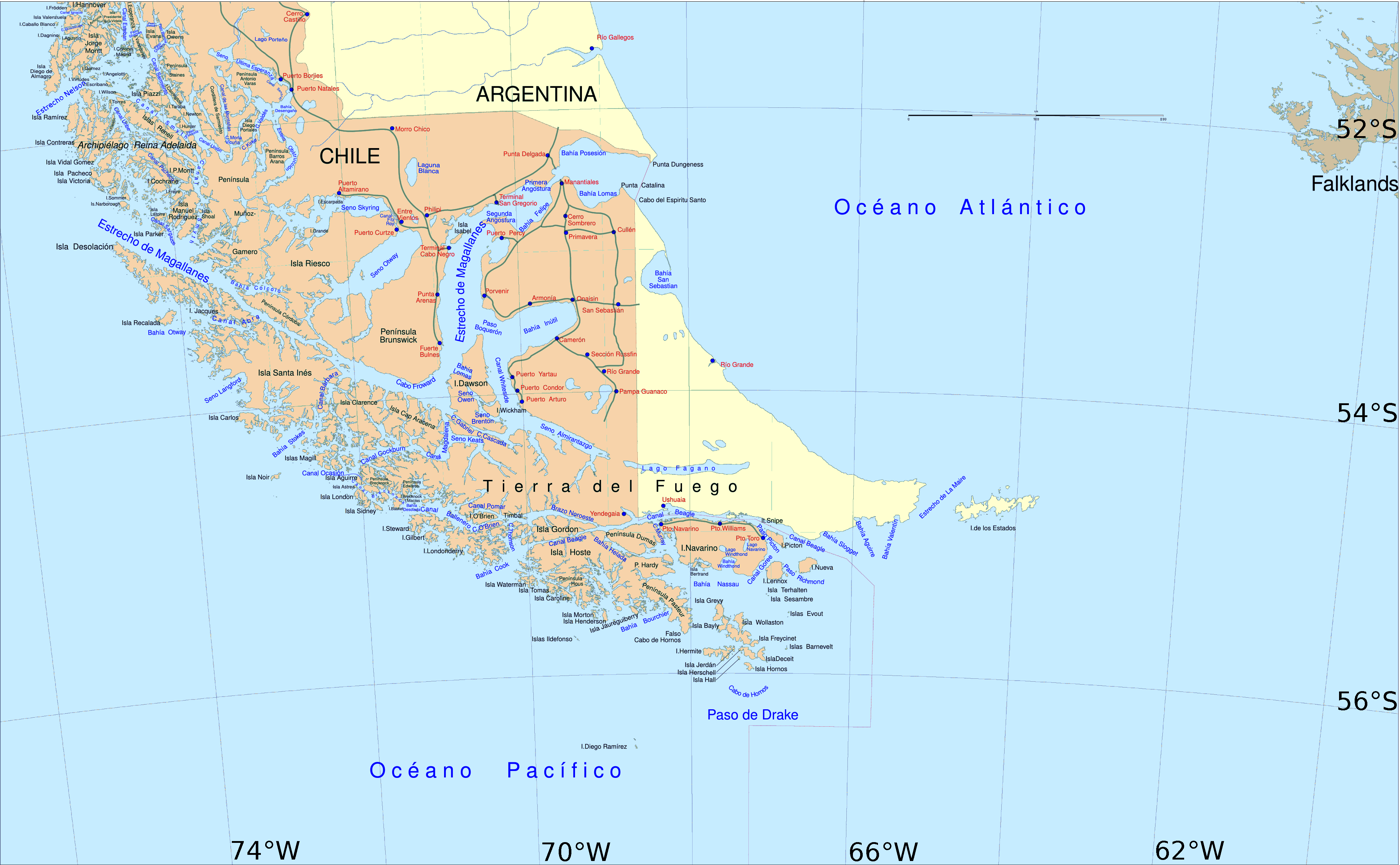
Southwest side of Tierra del Fuego.

The Ballenero Channel (Spanish: Canal Ballenero) runs between the Tierra del Fuego and Cook, Londonderry and the Stewart Islands and joints the Pomar Channel (north of O'Brien Island) and O'Brien Channel (south of the O'Brien Island) to the Desolada Bay and to the Pacific Ocean.

It is part of the official route between Puerto Williams and Strait of Magellan: from islote Anxious - Canal Magdalena - Canal Cockburn - Paso Brecknock or Canal Ocasión - Canal Unión - Paso Occidental - Paso Norte - Canal Ballenero- Canal O'Brien - Paso Timbales - Brazo noroeste del Canal Beagle - Canal Beagle - Puerto Williams (and back).(Chilean ships can use Paso Aguirre)

It was formerly known as Whaleboat Sound, as in US Hydrographic Office, South America Pilot, (1916).

== See also ==
- Fjords and channels of Chile
