= Évremond de Bérard =

French painter

- Born: June 30, 1824; Sainte-Anne, Guadeloupe
- Died: January 25, 1881 (aged 56); Paris

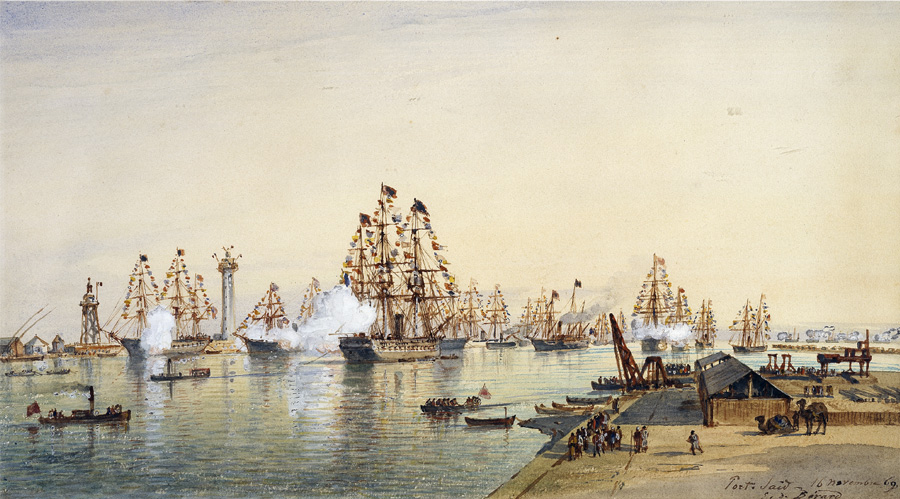
Opening of the Suez Canal

Évremond de Bérard (30 June 1824 – 25 January 1881) was a French painter and lithographer. He spent much of his life travelling, and was present at the opening of the Suez Canal.

== Biography ==
In 1843, he began four years of study in Paris with the painter and pedagogue, François-Édouard Picot. A year after completing his studies, he obtained a position as an artist and draftsman for a naval station in the Indian Ocean. That same year, he began a three-year trip that took him to Réunion, Mauritius, India, the Comoro Islands, Madagascar, Senegal and, ultimately, Brazil.

In 1850, on Réunion, he married Céleste Caroline Selhausen (1827–1895), daughter of Pierre Selhausen, an infantry lieutenant and treasurer of the Lycée Leconte-de-Lisle in Saint-Denis. The following year, his son, Gabriel (1851–1904), was born in Paris. In 1852, he presented two paintings at the seventy-fifth anniversary exhibition of the Salon. He then returned to live on the family estate near Sainte-Anne.

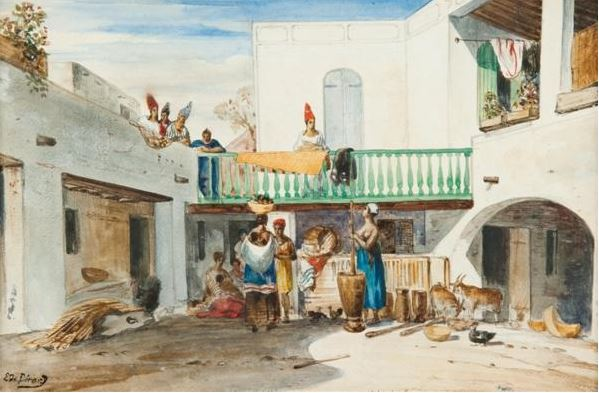
Interior Courtyard in Gorée, Senegal

From 1852 to 1857, he produced thirty paintings, watercolors and drawings on Guadeloupe and Martinique; notably, two for the new parish church in Pointe-à-Pitre. He also travelled to Trinidad, Guyana, Panama, Jamaica and Cuba. He also completed full-length portraits of Jean-Baptiste Jourdan and Thomas-Robert Bugeaud, for the prefecture building of Haute-Vienne, in Limoges. In 1858, he created lithographs, after works by the painter, Nélie Jacquemart, that appeared in L'Illustration

He was elected a member of the Société Impériale Zoologique d’Acclimatation in 1859. Another exhibition at the Salon followed in 1861, with scenes from India. In 1865 and 1866, agents of Emperor Napoleon III commissioned him to create two paintings for the museums in Bergues and Carpentras.

The Empress Eugénie invited him to attend the inauguration of the Suez Canal in 1869; which provided him with the opportunity to create numerous drawings and paintings of Egypt. The following year, he was elected to the Société de Géographie. In the following three years, he painted four wall panels in the Gallery of Mineralogy and Geology at the French National Museum of Natural History. Despite these successes, he found himself facing financial difficulties and was forced to have an agent sell six of his paintings on commission.

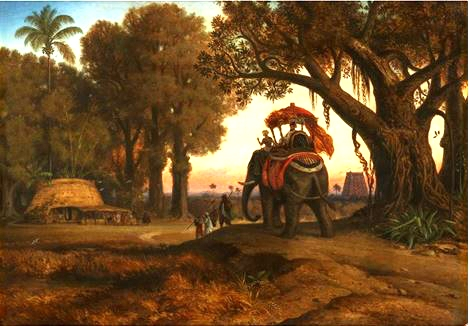
Elephant Caravan

He was entrusted with an expedition to India in 1877; to do research on anthropology and botany; specifically, plant reproduction. From 1878 to 1879, he lived in the northern region of Kashmir, which inspired numerous watercolors and drawings. By the time he returned, he was seriously ill.

In 1880, some of these works became his final exhibition at the Salon. In 1881, he died of malaria and was interred in the family vault at Père-Lachaise Cemetery.

A retrospective exhibition of his works was presented in Paris in 2017; celebrating the publication of his biography.
