= Gable Island =

Island of Argentina in the Beagle Channel

Coordinates: 54°53′S 67°29′W

Gable Island (Spanish: Isla Gable) is an Argentine island part of Tierra del Fuego Province. The island is located on the northern side of east–west Beagle Channel less than 300 metres (980 ft) from Tierra del Fuego Island and about 1.5 kilometres (0.93 mi) from Chilean Navarino Island. The island has an irregular shape with many shoal banks extending into bays and open channel. The islands surface is mostly covered by Magallanic forest. Drumlins from the last ice age dominate topography which has allowed the formation of several small lagoons on the island.

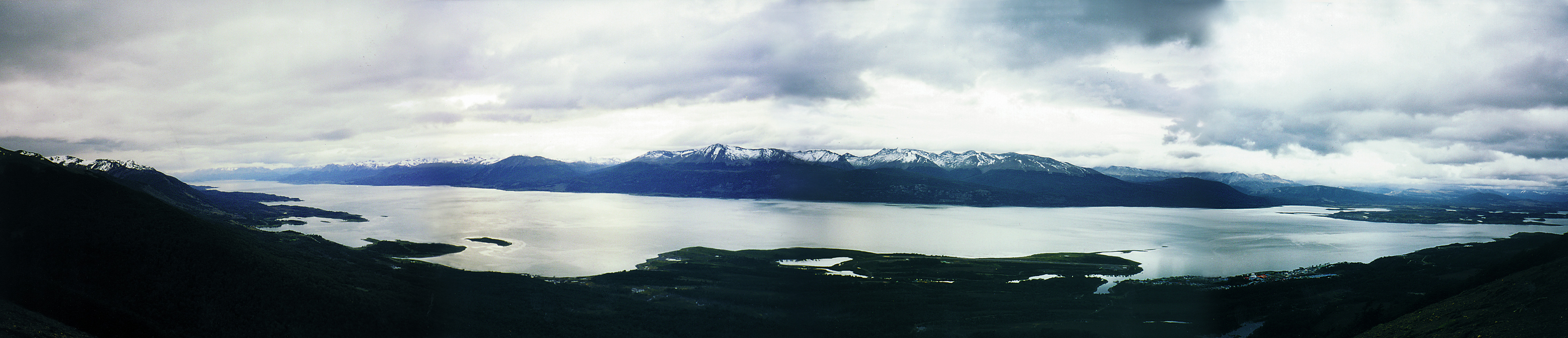
View of Gable Island (right) in Beagle Channel seen from above Puerto Williams.
