= O'Brien Island, Chile =

Island of Chile

O'Brien Island
- Location within Chile

Geography
- Coordinates: 54.880213°S 70.557783°W
- Area: 136.3 km^{2} (52.6 sq mi)
- Coastline: 68.7 km (42.69 mi)
- Highest elevation: 701 m (2300 ft)

Administration
- Chile
- Region: Magallanes y la Antártica Chilena Region
- Commune: Cabo de Hornos

O'Brien Island (Spanish: Isla O'Brien) is located at the western end of the Beagle Channel.

East of the island is the Paso Darwin, that is the beginning of the Beagle Channel. To the north is the Isla Grande de Tierra del Fuego, separated by the Pomar Channel. To the South is the Guillermo Island and the Londonderry Island separated by the O'Brien Channel.
