= Londonderry Island =

Island of Chile

Native name: Isla Londonderry
- Location within Southern Patagonia

Geography
- Coordinates: 55.066667°S 69.433333°W
- Adjacent to: Pacific Ocean
- Area: 643 km^{2} (248 sq mi)
- Highest point: 1,548m

Administration
- Chile
- Region: Magallanes
- Province: Antártica Chilena
- Commune: Cabo de Hornos, Chile

Additional information
- NGA UFI=-889707

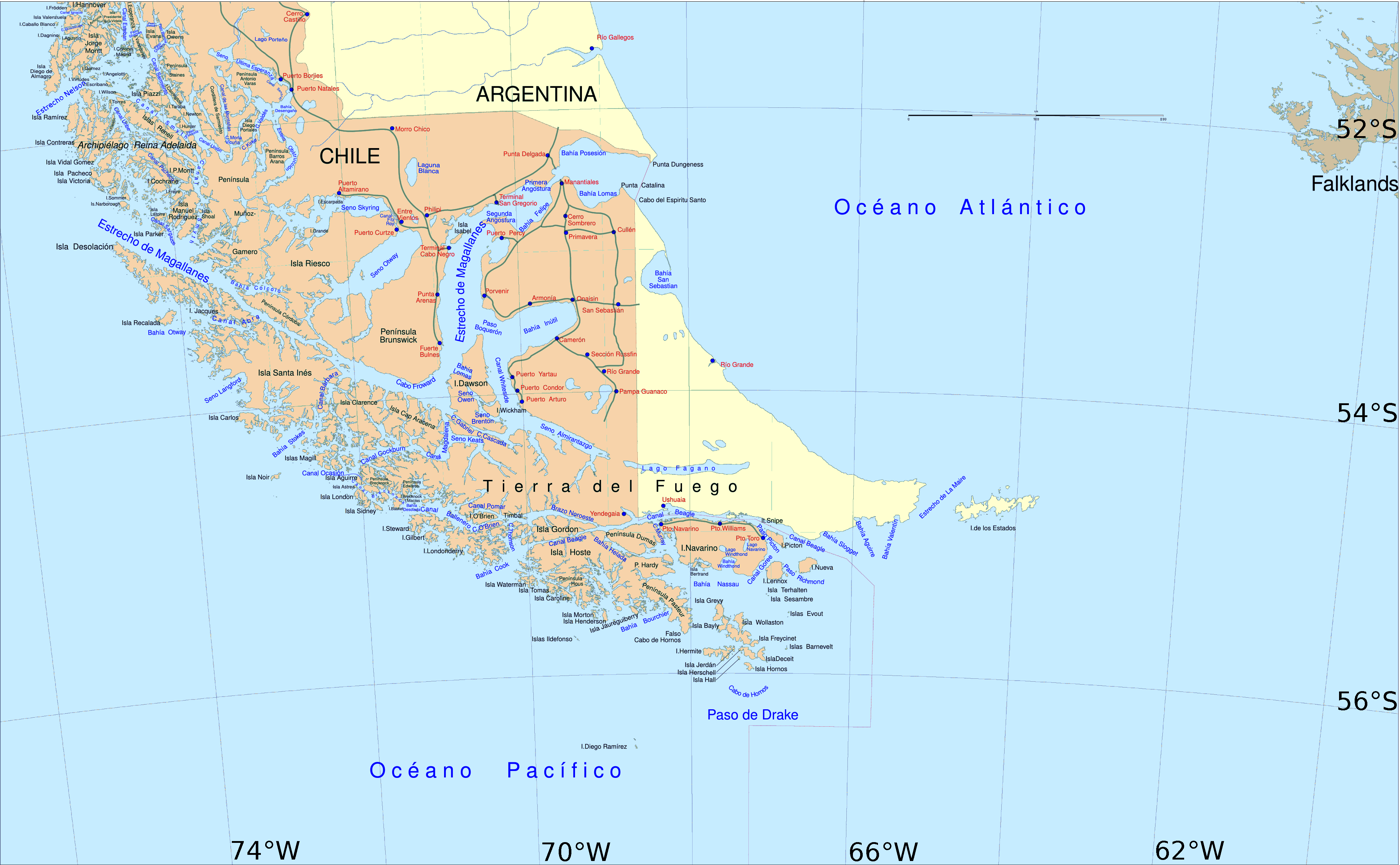
Londonderry Island can be found above the “n” in Océano Pacifico

Londonderry Island (Spanish: Isla Londonderry) is a Chilean island (UFI -889706) in the Magallanes Region at the western end of the Beagle Channel and Darwin Sound. The island was named by the captain of HMS Beagle, Robert FitzRoy, whose maternal grandfather was The 1st Marquess of Londonderry, an Ulster-Scots peer.

The island is very irregularly shaped. It lies between Fitzroy Bay to the west and Bahía Cook to the east, and between the Pacific Ocean to the south and the Ballenero Channel and O'Brien Channel to the north. Nearby islands include Gilbert Island and Stewart Island to the northwest, O'Brien Island, Chile to the north, and Cook Island (or London Island) and Thompson Island to the east.

Londonderry Island and smaller nearby islands form an archipelago (UFI -889707) known as the Londonderry Islands (Spanish: Islas Londonderry).
