= Gordon Island =

Island in the Tierra del Fuego, Chile

Native name: Isla Gordon
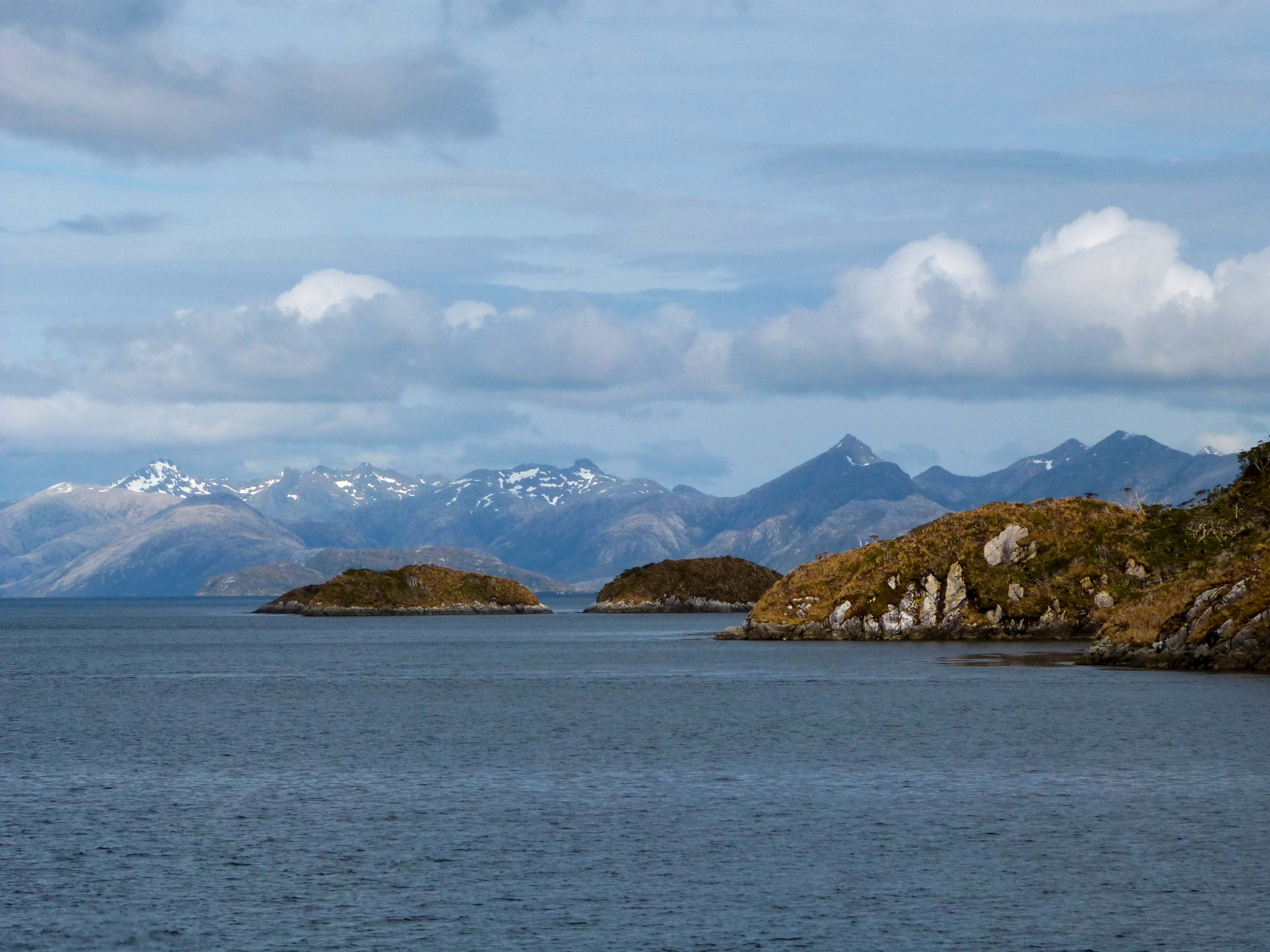
- Gordon Island, seen from the Beagle Channel

- Location within Southern Patagonia

Geography
- Coordinates: 54°58′S 69°35′W
- Adjacent to: Beagle Channel, Pacific Ocean
- Area: 591 km^{2} (228 sq mi)
- Coastline: 228.3 km (141.86 mi)
- Highest point: 1548

Administration
- Chile
- Region: Magallanes
- Province: Antártica Chilena
- Commune: Cabo de Hornos

Additional information
- NGA UFI=-883298

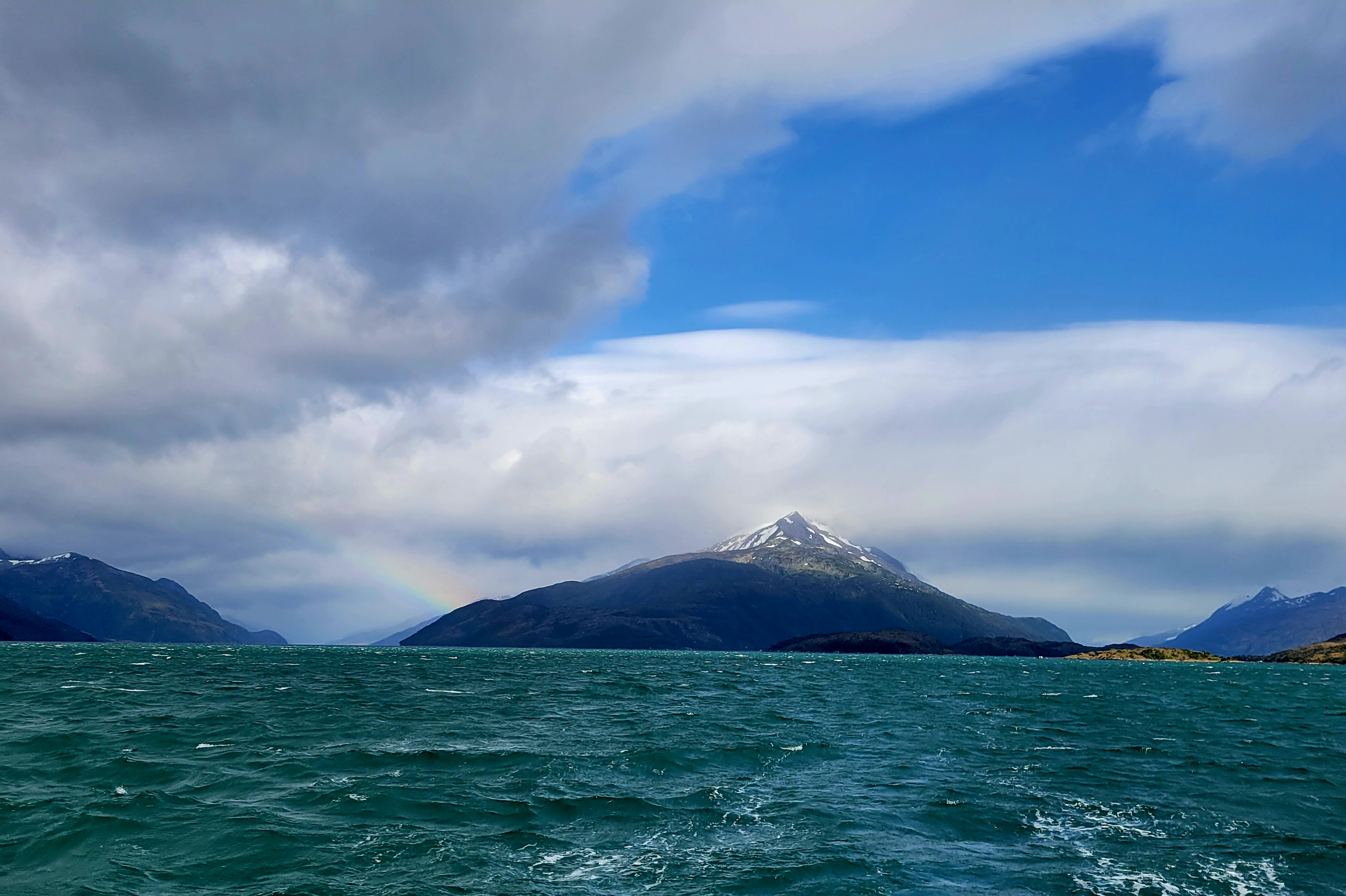
East tip of Gordon Island, looking west from the main Beagle Channel, with the Southwest arm (and Isla Hoste) on the left and the Northwest arm (and the Tierra del Fuego main island) on the right.

Gordon Island (Spanish: Isla Gordon) is an uninhabited island in the Tierra del Fuego archipelago located between the Isla Grande de Tierra del Fuego and the Hoste Island. It divides the Beagle Channel in two arms, the Northwest arm or Pomar Channel and the Southwest arm. It has two deep fjords on the north coast, Tres Brazos and Romanche, and one on the south coast, Fleuriais. The entrance of the Romanche fjord is directly south of the mouth of the Romanche Glacier in the Cordillera Darwin on the Isla Grande de Tierra del Fuego. Just west of the Romanche fjord, “Monte McChristie” (about 840 metres; 2,750 ft) is one of the few climbed peaks on the island, after its first reported ascent in 2026 by Brett Nichols (USA) and Ulli Bayer (USA), led by Seba Beltrame (of Patagon Mountain Agency).

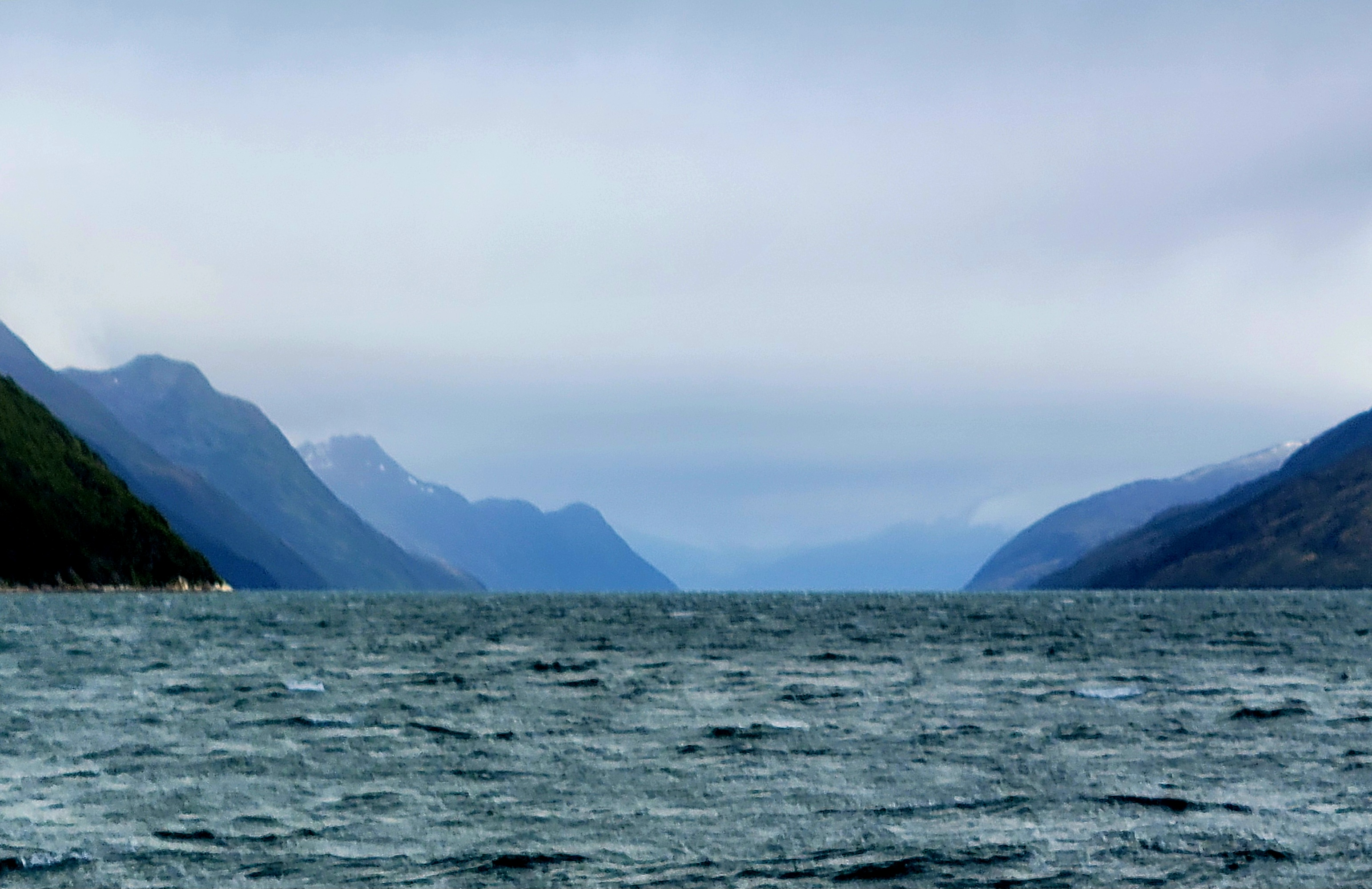
Looking west on the Northwest arm of the Beagle Channel, with the north shore of Gordon Island on the left, and the south shore of the Darwin Range on the Tierra del Fuego main island on the right. The second mountain peak from the left is "Monte McChristie", which marks the entrance to the Romanche fjord on its east side.

At the east end of the island is located the lighthouse Punta Divide.

== See also ==
- Media related to category:Islands of Chile at Wikimedia Commons
- List of islands of Chile
- Cabo de Hornos
