= Reclus (volcano) =

Volcano located in the Patagonia Ice Field, Chile

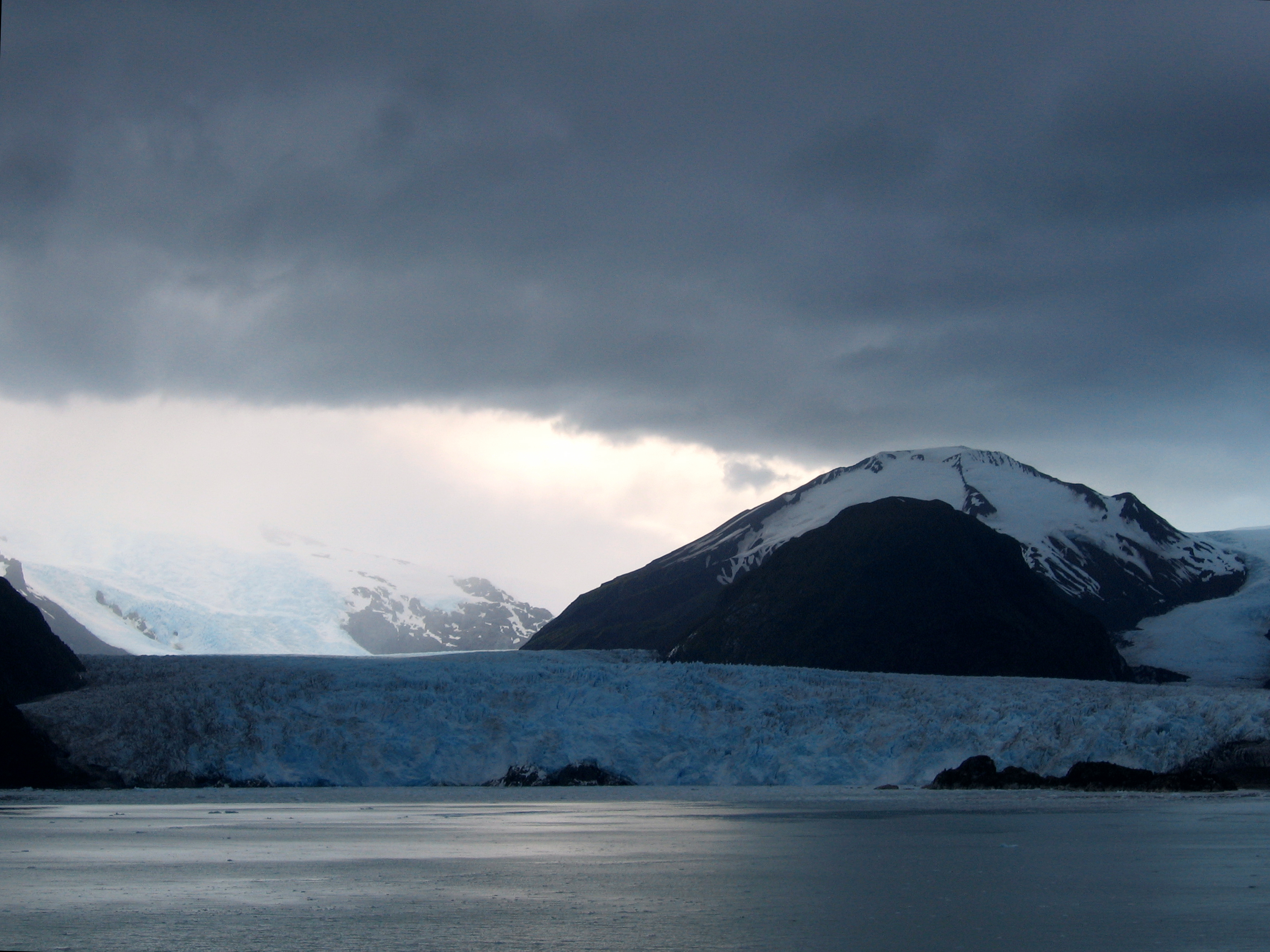
- Amalia Glacier with Reclus behind

Highest point
- Elevation: 1,000 m (3,300 ft)
- Coordinates: 50°57′50″S 73°35′05″W

Geography
- Location: Chile
- Parent range: Andes

Geology
- Mountain type(s): Cinder cone, composite volcano
- Last eruption: 1908 ± 1 year

Reclus (named after Élisée Reclus; sometimes confused with Cerro Mano del Diablo southwest of Reclus), also written as Reclús, is a cinder cone and stratovolcano located in the Southern Patagonian Ice Field, Chile. Part of the Austral Volcanic Zone of the Andes, its summit rises 1,000 metres (3,300 ft) above sea level and is capped by a crater about 1 kilometre (0.62 mi) wide. Close to the volcano lies the Amalia Glacier, which is actively eroding Reclus.

The volcano has been active during the late Pleistocene and Holocene. A large eruption – among the largest known in the Austral Volcanic Zone – occurred 15,260–14,373 years before present and released over 5 cubic kilometres (1.2 cu mi) of tephra. This tephra fell out over a large area of Patagonia as far as Tierra del Fuego, and disrupted the ecosystem in the region. Subsequently, further but smaller eruptions occurred during the Pleistocene and Holocene. The last historical eruption was in 1908.

The volcano is remote and monitoring began only recently. Two dams are located close to the volcano and might be impacted by future eruptions.

== Geography and geology ==
=== Regional ===
South of the Chile Triple Junction, the Antarctic Plate subducts beneath the South American Plate at a rate of 2 centimetres per year (0.79 in/year). This subduction process is responsible for volcanic activity in the Austral Volcanic Zone; south of the southernmost volcano of this zone, Fueguino, the subduction gives way to strike-slip faulting. This subduction process is not accompanied by much earthquake activity.

Not all volcanism at these latitudes was triggered by subduction; during the Miocene the Chile Rise was subducted here and this caused a temporary pause of the subduction process and the formation of a slab window. During this period, southern Patagonia was subject to extensive basaltic volcanism. Later subduction restarted and the Austral Volcanic Zone was born.

Farther north in Chile and Argentina, volcanism occurs as a consequence of the subduction of the Nazca Plate beneath the South America Plate, forming the Central Volcanic Zone in northern Chile and Argentina and the Southern Volcanic Zone in southern Chile and Argentina. These two volcanic zones are separated from each other and the Austral Volcanic Zone by gaps without recent volcanic activity.

=== Local ===
Reclus is a 1,000 metres (3,300 ft) high pyroclastic cone, featuring a c. 1 kilometre (0.62 mi) wide summit crater and is a small volcano. Seen from above, the volcano has the shape of an egg; the pointy end points due west and consists of 150–200 metres (490–660 ft) thick remnants of dacitic rocks of pre- or inter-glacial age. The rest of the volcano consists of a 2,000 metres (6,600 ft) wide outcrop of violet-reddish-brown pyroclastic material that is in part covered by snow. Traces of glacial erosion are not widespread on the edifice, but a radial pattern of erosional gullys overlays the volcano. In 2019, a 0.26 cubic kilometres (0.062 cu mi) landslide took place on its northeastern flank, which propagated below the Amalia Glacier. Lava and pyroclastics are its principal output.

The volcano rises within the cirque of the Amalia Glacier and the glacier is actively eroding Reclus; retreat of the glacier in the 1980s has exposed part of the volcano. Reclus lies about 10 kilometres (6.2 mi) east of the Amalia Fjord. The Southern Patagonian Ice Field and the Cordillera Sarmiento are found in the neighbourhood of Reclus, and Torres del Paine is c. 30 kilometres (19 mi) east of the volcano. Politically, the volcano lies in the commune of Natales.

The volcano was at first confused with Cerro Mano del Diablo, a mountain located southwest of Reclus proper and formed by sedimentary rocks; only in 1987 was the volcano's true location discovered. This volcano, like other volcanoes of the Austral Volcanic Zone, is not monitored and lies at considerable distance from human habitation. This remoteness of the volcanoes in the region and the frequently hostile weather conditions often make it difficult to identify volcanoes and their precise location.

Reclus is part of the Austral Volcanic Zone, a belt of volcanoes at the southernmost tip of South America which includes six volcanoes: from north to south, Lautaro, Viedma, Aguilera, Reclus, Monte Burney and Fueguino. These volcanoes are not very high, seldom exceeding 3,000 metres (9,800 ft). With the exception of the last they are all stratovolcanoes with glaciers and evidence of Holocene activity; Lautaro erupted in 1959. Activity in the Austral Volcanic Zone has resulted in the widespread deposition of tephra in southernmost South America. All of them have erupted exclusively andesite or dacite; basalts or basaltic andesite are absent in contrast to the Southern Volcanic Zone farther north. These rocks in the case of the Austral Volcanic Zone are all of adakitic character, but there does not appear to be an unifying reason for this chemistry among the various volcanoes.

Aguilera, Reclus and Burney are constructed along the eastern margin of the Patagonian Batholith. Metamorphic and sedimentary rocks of Paleozoic-Mesozoic age are also part of the basement. The terrain surrounding Reclus is formed by the volcanic-sedimentary El Quemado and Zapata formations.

=== Petrology ===
The groundmass of Reclus rocks is compositionally dacite to rhyolite, and contains phenocrysts of amphibole, hornblende, orthopyroxene and plagioclase. Plagioclase and quartz also form xenocrysts. The magmas of Reclus appear to form from slab melts that interacted with the mantle. Tephra records indicate that magma composition changed over time.

== Eruptive history ==
Reclus together with Aguilera, Hudson and Monte Burney has been a major source of tephra for the region of Tierra del Fuego and Patagonia. Tephra layers discovered in Laguna Potrok Aike and dated to 63,200 years ago, 44,000–51,000 and c. 34,000 years ago may come from Reclus. However, the potassium content of the 51,000-44,000 tephra seems to correlate more with Lautaro or Viedma.

The first post-glacial Reclus tephra in Laguna Potrok Aike was emplaced 15,700 years ago, soon before the R1 eruption. About four eruptions took place during the past 15,000 years that deposited ash in the Torres del Paine region. In general, distinguishing Reclus tephras from these of Aguilera, Lautaro or Viedma is difficult.

=== R1 eruption ===
A large eruption, called "R1", occurred at the end of the Last Glacial Maximum at Reclus. It was dated by radiocarbon dating to have occurred 12,640 ± 260 radiocarbon years ago. (Note: Equivalent to 15,260–14,373 years Before Present) Its total volume has been estimated at over 5 cubic kilometres (1.2 cu mi) (Note: Originally it was estimated to be over 10 kilometres (6.2 mi), but this estimate was later found to be a mathematical error) and with a volcanic explosivity index of 6 it is among the largest volcanic eruptions of the Austral Volcanic Zone, exceeding that of Holocene eruptions in the region, including the 1991 eruption of Cerro Hudson and possibly even the 1932 Quizapu eruption.

The R1 tephra, originally identified in Patagonia as "Tephra A", was deposited at various sites in southernmost Chile and Argentina such as Bahía Inutil, Brunswick Peninsula, Cardiel Lake, Cueva del Medio, Dawson Island, East Falkland, Estrecho de Magellanes, Fitzroy Channel, Muñoz Gamero Peninsula, Laguna Potrok Aike, (Note: Where it is about 1.5 metres (4 ft 11 in) thick. However, this occurrence of Reclus tephra seems to be younger than the R1 eruption and may reflect complexity in the history of this volcano) Puerto del Hambre, Río Rubens in Patagonia, Seno Otway, Seno Skyring, Grey Glacier and Tyndal Glacier of the Southern Patagonian Ice Shield, Tierra del Fuego and in the Última Esperanza Province. Other potential findings are at Dawson Island and Punta Arenas. Some of these deposits were formed by tephra that originally fell onto glaciers and was later transported to the eventual finding sites, other sites were covered by ice and thus did not accumulate any Reclus tephras. The tephra emission from this and later eruptions surely disrupted the local ecosystem and human habitations in the region as far south as Tierra del Fuego, possibly causing the extinction of a regional vicuña population in Patagonia.

The composition of the tephra varies between different outcrops; outcrops in Tierra del Fuego lack biotite unlike closer deposits. These deposits have been used as stratigraphic and chronological markers for events at the end of the last glaciation in the region. Ice cores taken at Taylor Dome in Antarctica display a spike in SO_{2} about 16,000 years ago, which may have originated at Reclus.

=== Late Pleistocene and Holocene ===
A set of tephras discovered at Torres del Paine, Nordenskjöld Lake and other locations in Patagonia and emplaced between 8,270 ± 90 and 9,435 ± 40 radiocarbon years ago may have originated in minor eruptions of Reclus. One of these eruptions, at 9,180 ± 120 radiocarbon years ago, might have deposited ash as far as Tierra del Fuego.

A 3,780 year old peat has been covered by tephra at least six times. Eruptions have also been inferred from tephra deposits elsewhere:

- 12,480 years before present also and deposited ash in Tierra del Fuego.
- 10,430 years before present, found in Torres del Paine.
- 9,624 years before present, found in Torres del Paine.
- A tephra with an age of 10,600–10,200 also comes from Reclus and originated in an eruption smaller than the R1 event.
- A tephra dated to 2,000 years before present in Torres del Paine have been attributed to Reclus. The tephra has been found in Lago Guanaco, Lago Margarita, Pantano Margarita (possibly) and Vega Nandú.
- A tephra dated 1,789 radiocarbon years ago in Lago Guanaco, Torres del Paine, and close to Lago el Toro. Much less extensive than R1, it has been called "R2 tephra".
- Another tephra dated 1,035 radiocarbon years ago in Lago Guanaco, Torres del Paine, and Pantano Margarita. Also much less extensive than R1, it has been called "R3 tephra".
- Finally, a tephra in Lake Arthuro of Santa Inés Island appears to come from an eruption at Reclus 1,040 years before present.

A tephra identified in an ice core at Talos Dome, Antarctica, and emplaced there 3,390 years before present is compositionally similar to Reclus products. However, there is little evidence for large eruptions at Reclus during the late Holocene and the Puyehue-Cordón Caulle volcano in the Southern Volcanic Zone has been proposed as a source for this tephra. In 2019, the occurrence of a 1458 AD eruption was proposed to explain the presence of sulfate deposits in Antarctic ice cores that were previously attributed to Kuwae. However, there are geochemical differences and there is little close-by evidence of eruptions at Reclus during that timespan.

=== Historical activity ===
In 1879, sailors on HMS Alert observed a volcanic eruption in an icefield and named the volcano Reclus after Élisée Reclus, but the Global Volcanism Program indicates that an earlier eruption occurred in 1869. The volcano first appeared in the 1922 edition of the map West Coast of South América from Magellan Strait to Valparaíso. Legends of the Tehuelche people about "black smoke" in the region could also refer to volcanic activity at Reclus.

The last recorded eruption of Reclus was in 1908, but local press reports in the 1980s and 1990s attributed earthquakes to volcanic activity at Reclus and Burney. Seismic activity was noted at Reclus in 1998, 2003 and 2020. Possible eruption phenomena were reported in 2008 in form of tephra deposition and cracks in the glaciers, and a landslide occurred on its northern side in 2017. In 2015, the Chilean SERNAGEOMIN announced that they would install an experimental surveillance system at Reclus and in 2020 it was classified as a "type III" volcano, meaning a high-hazard volcano. Ash from a future eruption of Reclus could be swept into the reservoirs of Néstor Kirchner Dam and Jorge Cepernic Dam on the Santa Cruz River, impacting their activity.

== See also ==
- List of volcanoes in Chile
