= Aguilera (volcano) =

Mountain in Chile

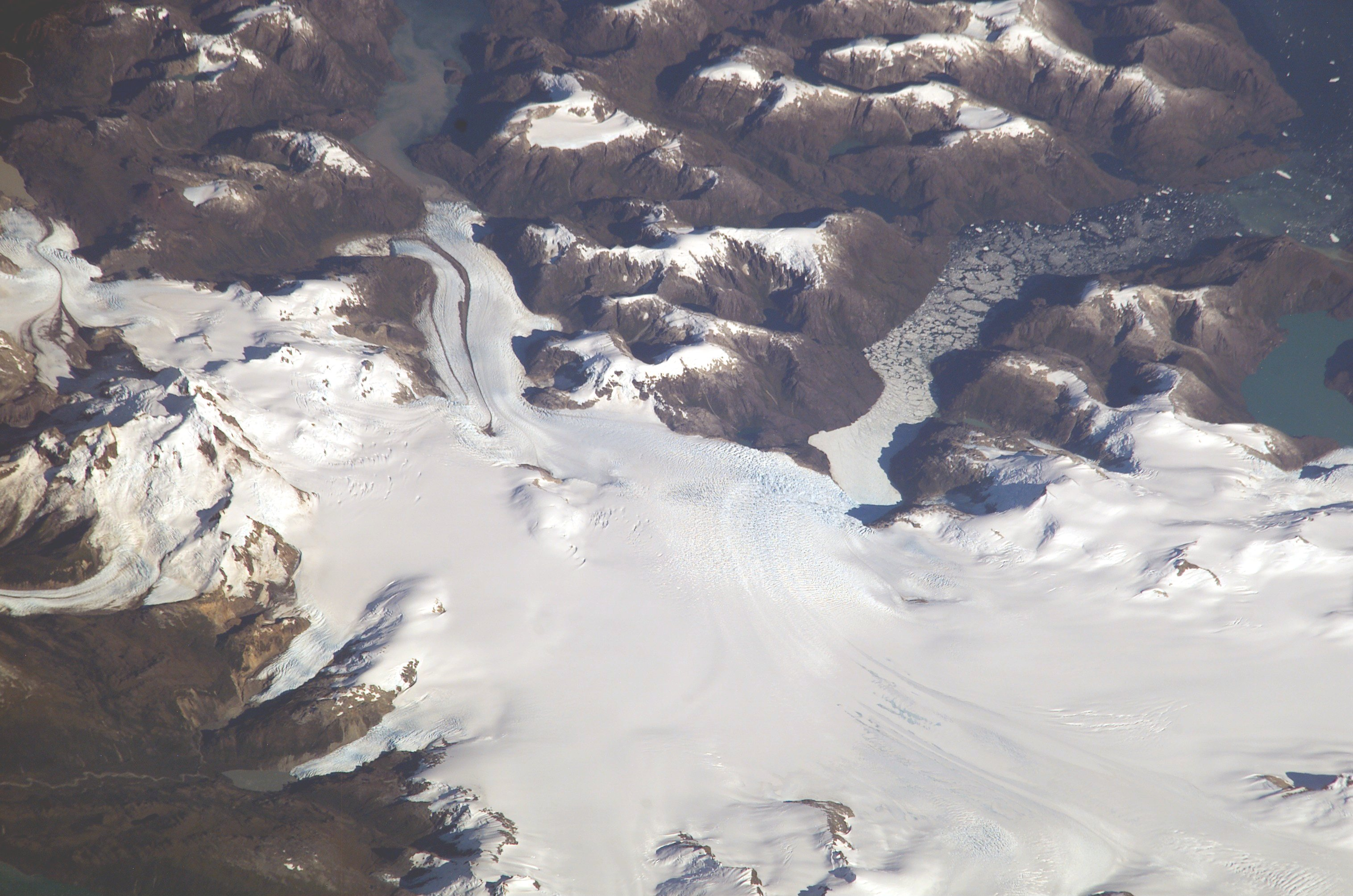
- The volcano is visible in the leftmost portion of the image.

Highest point
- Elevation: 2,546 m (8,353 ft)
- Coordinates: 50°20′0″S 73°45′0″W

Geography
- Location: Chile
- Parent range: Andes

Geology
- Mountain type: Stratovolcano
- Last eruption: 3,000 ± 1,000 years before present, but even more recent activity likely

Climbing
- First ascent: 2014

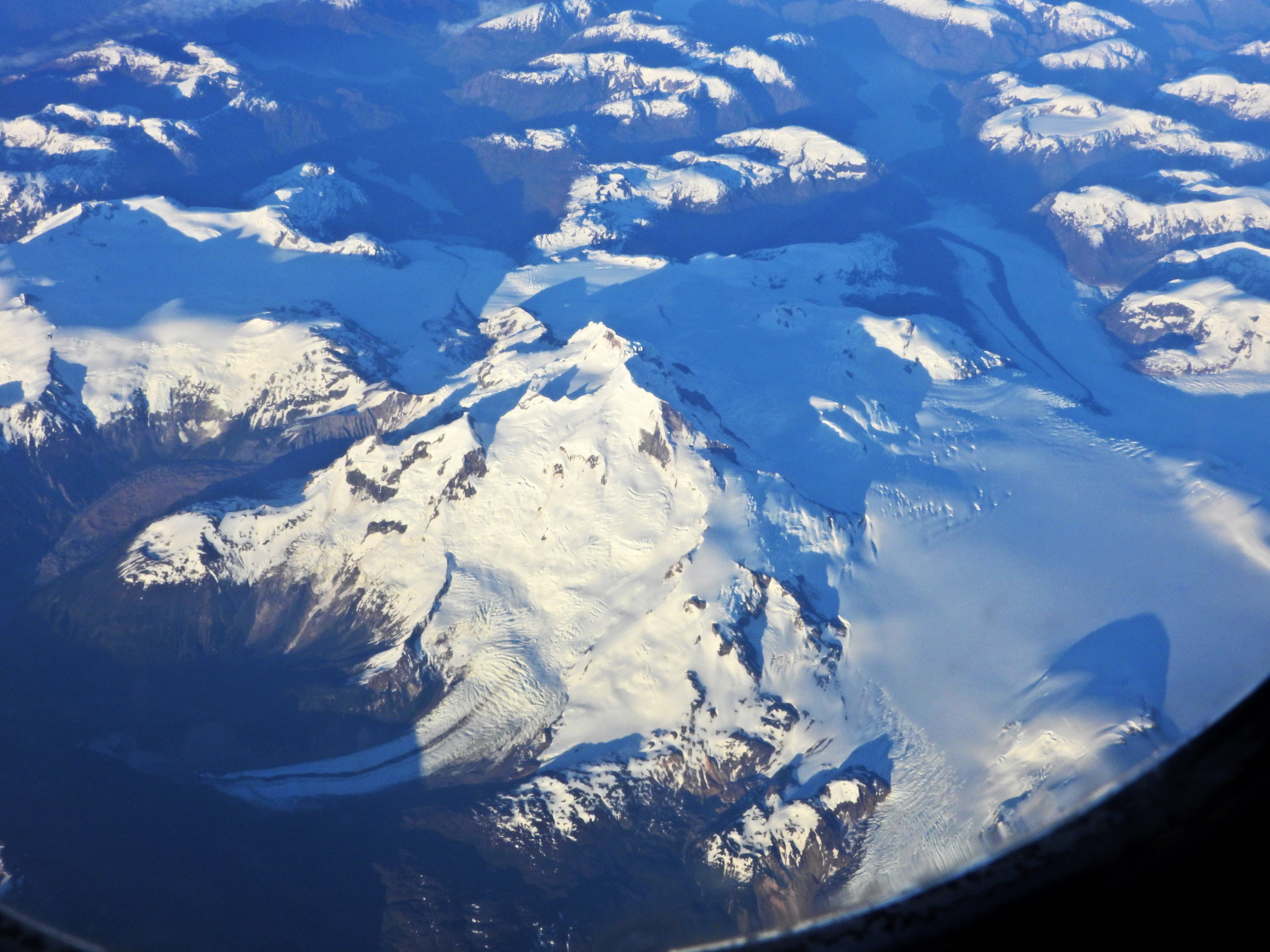
Aguilera volcano seen from air (Oct-2025). View to the southwest.

Aguilera (2,546 metres (8,353 ft)) is a stratovolcano in southern Chile. The volcano rises above the edge of the Southern Patagonian Ice Field. It is a remote volcano that was identified as such in 1985. The first ascent only occurred in 2014, making it the last unclimbed major Andean volcano.

Aguilera is located west of Lake Argentino and northeast of Peel Fjord in the southern Andes and erupted mainly dacites and pyroclastic tephra. It has erupted several times in the Holocene, with a major eruption taking place 3,000 ± 1,000 years before present. Its eruptions have spread ashfalls over Patagonia.

== Geography and geomorphology ==
Aguilera lies west of the city of Calafate, northwest of Peel Fjord and within the commune of Natales. There is not much knowledge on volcanism in southernmost Chile/Patagonia as the volcanoes are poorly mapped, difficult to access and the weather conditions hostile. Aguilera was named in 1933 by Alberto Maria de Agostini, so its volcanic nature was first established in 1985.

Aguilera is part of the Andean Austral Volcanic Zone, which lies in the southernmost territory of Chile. It consists of six volcanoes, from north to south these are Lautaro, Viedma, Aguilera, Reclus, Monte Burney and Cook; only the first has clearly documented historical activity, in 1959–1960. The first five are located on the South America Plate at increasing distances from the trench, while Cook is on the Scotia Plate and is a complex of lava domes unlike the other volcanoes which are stratovolcanoes. North of Lautaro lies a 300 kilometres (190 mi) long gap without volcanism and then Cerro Hudson, the southernmost volcano of the Southern Volcanic Zone.

The volcano is a 2,545 metres (8,350 ft) or 2,546 metres (8,353 ft) high stratovolcano that rises from the Southern Patagonian Ice Field, reaching a height of about 1,500 metres (4,900 ft) above its base and almost entirely covered with ice.

== Geology ==
Off southwesternmost South America, the Antarctic Plate subducts beneath the South America Plate at a rate of 2–2.5 centimetres per year (0.79–0.98 in/year). This subduction is responsible for the volcanism in the Austral Volcanic Zone, whereas earthquake activity is low; this is possibly because the subducting plate is too hot and too slow moving.

The basement below Aguilera is of Paleozoic-early Mesozoic age and consists of metamorphic rocks. The volcano sits at the easterly margin of the Patagonian Batholith, a Mesozoic-Cenozoic igneous rock province.

Volcanism occurs along much of the Andes, partly due to the subduction of the Antarctic Plate and partly due to the subduction of the Nazca Plate, in each case beneath the South America Plate. The latter subduction gives rise to the Northern Volcanic Zone, the Central Volcanic Zone and the Southern Volcanic Zone of the Andes. The Austral Volcanic Zone was once considered part of the Southern Volcanic Zone.

=== Composition ===
Aguilera has erupted dacites with intermediate contents of potassium, defining a calc-alkaline suite with adakitic characteristics. Phenocrysts include amphibole, biotite, clinopyroxene, hornblende and plagioclase; plagioclase and also orthoclase and pyroxene often occur as xenoliths.

Melts of subducted sediment and from the subducting slab give rise to the magmas of Aguilera and other volcanoes of the northern Austral Volcanic Zone, but they are subsequently modified by interactions with the mantle wedge and in the case of Aguilera, Lautaro and Viedma, further interaction takes place with the Paleozoic crust.

== Climate and vegetation ==
Aguilera lies within the Southern Hemisphere Westerlies belt and the average temperature of the region is about 4–10 °C (39–50 °F). There is a west-east precipitation gradient from 1,400 millimetres per year (55 in/year) to less than 200 millimetres per year (7.9 in/year) in the region; frontal systems and cyclones within the westerlies deliver most precipitation in the region, but precipitation rates are controlled by orographic precipitation and the rainshadow effect resulting in the west-east gradient.

Vegetation in the region ranges from Magellanic subpolar forests to semidesert, depending on the amount of moisture available; Nothofagus species form most of the woods, including Nothofagus antarctica, Nothofagus betuloides and Nothofagus pumilio.

== Eruption history ==
Aguilera erupted during the Holocene, depositing tephra in the region of Lago Argentino and Torres del Paine. The composition of rocks erupted by Aguilera are similar to these from Lautaro and Viedma, and the linkage of specific ash deposits to Aguilera is based mainly on geographical considerations. Other volcanoes have left tephra deposits in the wider region, including Cerro Hudson, Monte Burney and Reclus.

Evidence of possible eruptions at Aguilera include a 42,400 - 51,747 years old 70 millimetres (2.8 in) thick tephra from Laguna Potrok Aike, two ash layers emplaced 5,700 and 5,150 years before present in the Vega Ñandú mire in Torres del Paine National Park, and a 5,500 years old tephra layer at various sites in and around Peninsula Avellaneda. A tephra layer found at archeological sites around Lago Argentino and deposited there 4,091 - 4,566 years before present originated at Aguilera and probably disrupted local human communities. Farther away in Antarctica, a tephra found in Talos Dome and deposited there 4,420 years before present may have originated at this volcano as well.

Another smaller eruption occurred at Aguilera after the A1 event and deposited ash in the Lago Argentino area; the date of its eruption is unknown. There are no known historical eruptions although an eruption reported in 1886 in the area may have occurred at Aguilera.

=== A1 eruption ===
The major A1 eruption occurred at Aguilera 3000±100 or 2978+91
−104 years ago. It deposited tephra east of the volcano as far south as the Strait of Magellan; other Aguilera tephras are less widespread. Its volume has been estimated to be between 3.6–9.5 cubic kilometres (0.86–2.28 cu mi), larger than the 1991 eruption of Cerro Hudson, reaching level 5 on the volcanic explosivity index.

Tephra deposits from this eruption have been found in the Cordillera Baguales (6–8 centimetres (2.4–3.1 in) thickness), at Gran Campo Nevado (1.5 millimetres (0.059 in) thickness), Lago Argentino (6–8 centimetres (2.4–3.1 in) thickness), Lago Cardiel (1 centimetre (0.39 in) thickness), Lago Roca (10 centimetres (3.9 in) thickness), Lake Viedma (2 centimetres (0.79 in) thickness), Brunswick Peninsula (1 centimetre (0.39 in) thickness), Seno Skyring (2 centimetres (0.79 in)), Torres del Paine National Park (2–3 centimetres (0.79–1.18 in) thickness) and Isla Grande de Tierra del Fuego (1 centimetre (0.39 in) thickness). On Isla Grande de Tierra del Fuego apparently the eruption did not substantially impact human populations. Chemicals derived from Aguilera tephra are found in cave deposits close to Monte Burney. Furthermore, a 3,600 years old sulfur dioxide-rich layer in ice cores from Talos Dome, Antarctica, may have been produced by the Aguilera eruption.

== First climb ==
Aguilera was the last major volcano in the Andes to be climbed, with the first successful attempt occurring in August 2014 by a group of Chilean climbers.
