= Lautaro (volcano) =

Subglacial stratovolcano in Chile

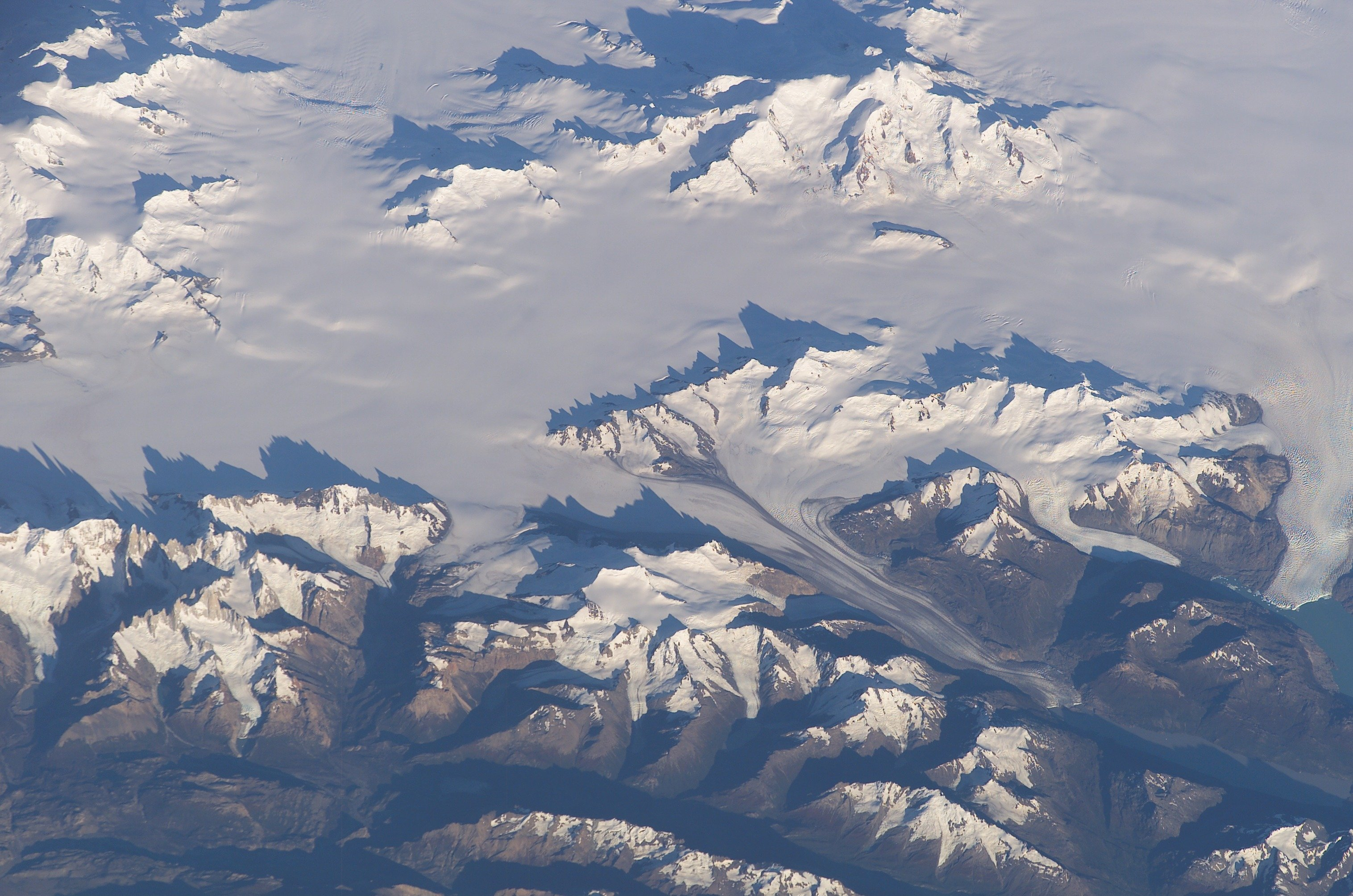
- The volcano is visible in the upper portion of this NASA image, whereas Mount Fitz Roy is in the lower left corner.

Highest point
- Elevation: 3,623 m (11,886 ft)
- Prominence: 3,345 m (10,974 ft); Ranked 58th
- Listing: Ultra
- Coordinates: 49°01′08″S 73°30′14″W

Geography
- Location within Chile
- Location: Aisén, Chile
- Parent range: Andes

Geology
- Mountain type: Stratovolcano
- Volcanic zone: Austral Volcanic Zone
- Last eruption: March 1979

Climbing
- First ascent: 29 January 1964 by Peter Skvarca and Luciano Pera
- Easiest route: snow/ice climb

Lautaro is an active subglacial stratovolcano located in Chilean Patagonia, in the northern part of the Southern Patagonian Ice Field. Its summit rises roughly 2,400 m (7,900 ft) above the average surface of the ice cap plateau. Its height above sea level is 3,623 m (11,900 ft).

== Geography and geomorphology ==
Lautaro is located within the Southern Patagonian Ice Field, and is the highest summit in its area. Bad weather and remote location make the volcano difficult to access. The existence of a volcano at Lautaro was recognized in 1879, but it was identified as Lautaro only in 1961. The volcano was named in 1952; it was originally named "volcán de Los Gigantes" and sometimes confused with the neighbouring non-volcano Cerro FitzRoy.

The volcano is a composite volcano and a stratovolcano covered with glaciers. Its elevation is variously given as 3,542 metres (11,621 ft), 3,380 metres (11,089 ft) or 3,067 metres (10,062 ft). It rises about 2,400 metres (7,900 ft) above the surrounding ice, and bears traces of glacial erosion. The edifice covers an area of about 150 square kilometres (58 sq mi) and about 90% of it is covered with ice. It has a parasitic vent on the western side and two volcanic craters just north of the summit, one of which is 1 kilometre (0.62 mi) wide. The Lautaro Glacier descends the western slope, while the icefield at the eastern foot is drained by the O'Higgins Glacier.

It is part of the Austral Volcanic Zone (AVZ), a belt of volcanoes in southwesternmost South America that includes (from north to south) Lautaro, Viedma, Aguilera, Reclus, Burney and Cook. All these volcanoes do not exceed 3 kilometres (1.9 mi) height and most have produced tephras during the Holocene. North of Lautaro comes first a volcanic gap, (Note: A volcano named Mimosa lies about 10 kilometres (6.2 mi) north of Lautaro and was fumarolically active in 1973. Cerro Arenales is also located north of Lautaro but it's not clear that it actually is a volcano.) then Mount Hudson from the Southern Volcanic Zone.

== Geology ==
Off the southwestern tip of South America, the Antarctic Plate subducts beneath the South American Plate at a rate of 2 centimetres per year (0.79 in/year). The subduction process is responsible for the volcanism of the AVZ. To the north the subduction zone is limited by the Chile Triple Junction, to the south it gradually leads into the Magallanes-Fagnano fault zone. Other volcanoes in the region are Cerro Pampa northeast of Lautaro, which was active in the Miocene, Cerro del Fraile south-southeast and the Pali-Aike volcanic field far southeast of it.

With the exception of a granite outcrop west of the volcano, the basement under Lautaro is hidden beneath ice, but in the rest of the AVZ it consists of Paleozoic-Mesozoic metamorphic rocks, subsequent Mesozoic to Cenozoic volcanic rocks and sediments. Several AVZ volcanoes are located close to or on the South Patagonian Batholith.

Lautaro has erupted dacite with a porphyritic to vitrophyric texture. Phenocrysts include biotite, clinopyroxene, hornblende, orthopyroxene, plagioclase and quartz. Rocks of the AVZ define an adakitic suite. The peculiar composition of AVZ magmas appears to reflect the melting of slab rocks from the downgoing Antarctic Plate.

== Eruption history ==
Potassium-argon dating has yielded ages of 161,000±11,000 to 30,000±73,000 years years. A 43,400 years old tephra layer in Laguna Potrok Aike might originate from Lautaro, while the attribution of 35,600 and 34,200 years old tephra layers to this volcano is less certain. Two tephra layers in Lago Cardiel emplaced 3,345 and 3,010 years ago could come from Lautaro or another northern AVZ volcano. Three tephra layers in the Lago Viedma-Lago San Martin have been attributed to Lautaro.

Lautaro is the most historically active volcano of the AVZ, with several eruptions. Activity is recorded from 1876, 1878–1879, 1883, 1933, 1945, 1959–1960, 1972 and 1978–1979. (Note: Tephra attributed to a volcano Arenales north of Lautaro may instead come from Lautaro.) The 1959 eruption was observed from aircraft, clarifying the position of the volcano, (Note: A German expedition in 1934 had discovered an active volcano, but without specifying where. This led to a long mystery of where this volcano was and whether there was more than one.) and is the only well-documented historic eruption in the AVZ. (Note: A newspaper report in the region was dedicated to the eruption.) Other possible eruptions took place in 1876, 1878, 1972 and 1976, and an unknown volcano erupted in 1886.

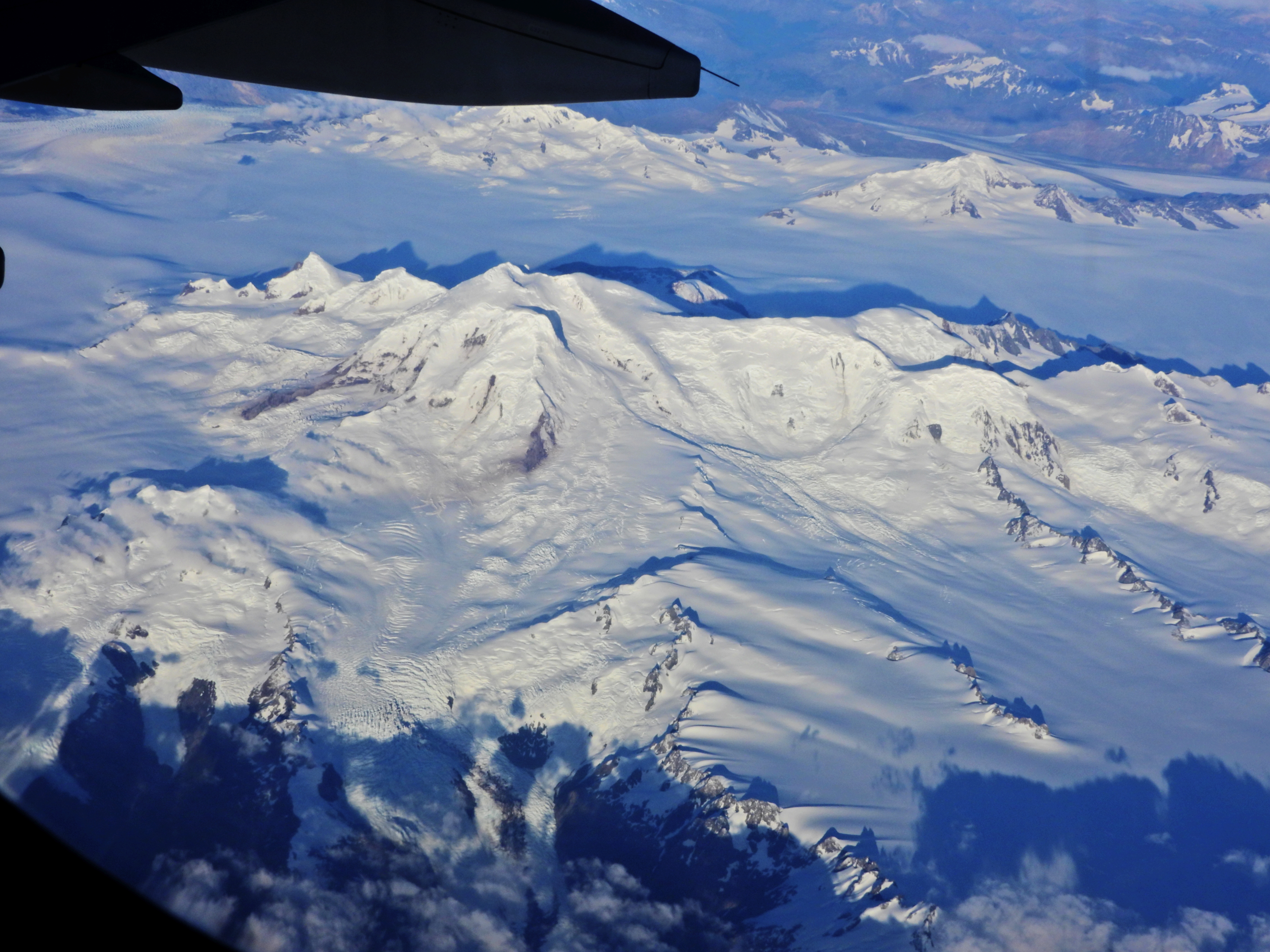
Lautaro volcano in Southern Patagonian icefield, February 2025

In the outflow glaciers of the Patagonian ice cap and in aerial photographs, volcanic ash and pumice from Lautaro have been noted on adjacent glaciers; block-and-ash flows may indicate the past occurrence of lava domes or coulees. Tephra layers from several historical eruptions have been found in adjacent lakes, where ecosystems were altered by the ash fallout. However, distinguishing between Lautaro tephras and these of neighbouring volcanoes is difficult.

In 1960 a fissure on the northern side was seen producing steam. Fumarolic activity was also observed in 1964, and smelled of sulfur. Continuing fumarolic activity was observed in 1974.

== Ascent history ==
The first ascent of Lautaro was made by Peter Skvarca and Luciano Pera, on 29 January 1964. They climbed the southeast ridge, encountering many crevasses, some steep ice walls, cornices, and a snow mushroom at the summit. They found an active crater and strong sulfurous emissions near the summit. The second ascent was made by Eric Jones, Mick Coffey, and Leo Dickinson on 2 March 1973, as part of a crossing of the Southern Patagonian Ice Field. Both the Pacific Ocean and the mountains to the east are visible from its summit.

== See also ==
- List of volcanoes in Chile
- List of Ultras of South America
