= Monte Burney =

Stratovolcano in southern Chile

Coordinates: 52.33°S 73.4°W

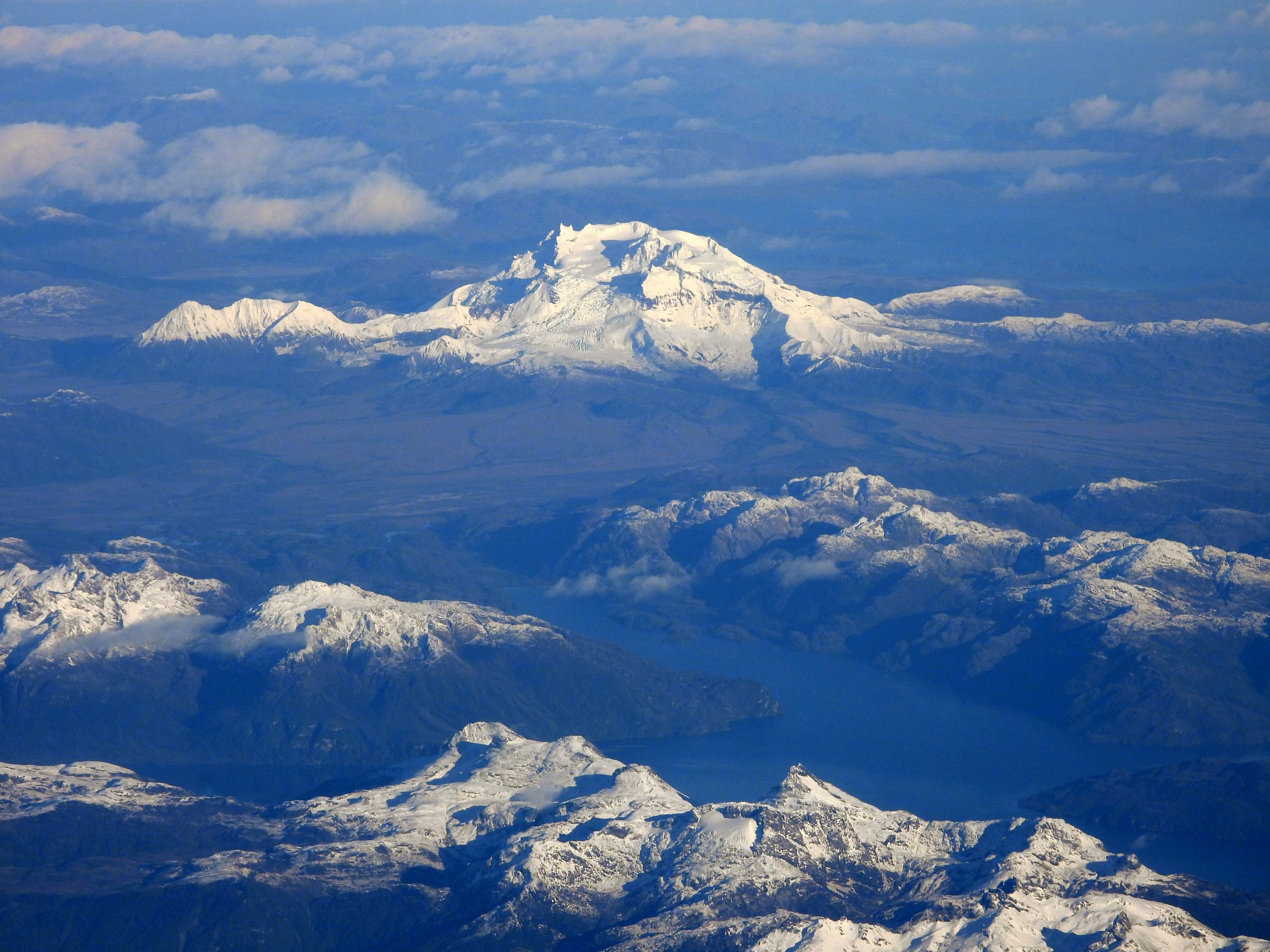
- Monte Burney seen from the air, towards the southwest

Highest point

Naming
- Etymology: After James Burney

Geography
- Country: Chile
- Region: Magallanes Region
- Commune: Natales

Geology
- Last eruption: 1910

Climbing
- First ascent: 1973

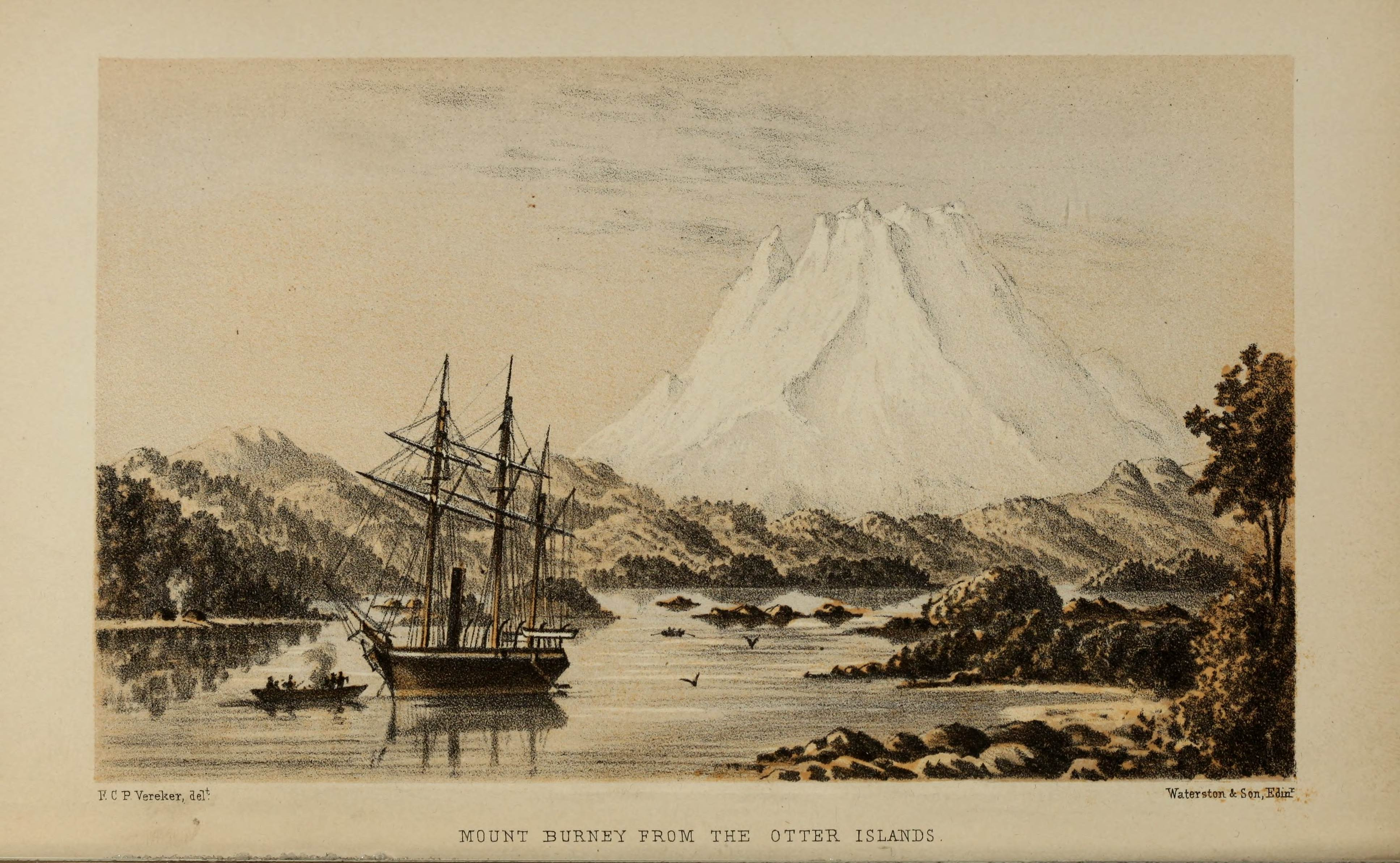
Monte Burney, painting of 1871

Monte Burney is a volcano in southern Chile, part of its Austral Volcanic Zone which consists of six volcanoes with activity during the Quaternary. This volcanism is linked to the subduction of the Antarctic Plate beneath the South America Plate and the Scotia Plate.

Monte Burney is formed by a caldera with a glaciated stratovolcano on its rim. This stratovolcano in turn has a smaller caldera. An eruption is reported for 1910, with less certain eruptions in 1970 and 1920.

Tephra analysis has yielded evidence for many eruptions during the Pleistocene and Holocene, including two large explosive eruptions during the early and mid-Holocene. These eruptions deposited significant tephra layers over Patagonia and Tierra del Fuego.

== Name ==
The volcano is named after James Burney, a companion of James Cook. It is one of the many English language placenames in the region, which are the product of the numerous English research expeditions such as these by Robert FitzRoy and Phillip Parker King in 1825–1830.

== Geography and geomorphology ==
Monte Burney is on the northwest Muñoz Gomera Peninsula. This area lies in the Patagonian region of Chile, which is known for its fjords. The volcano lies in the commune of Natales 200 kilometres (120 mi) northwest of Punta Arenas, and approximately 100 kilometres (62 mi) southwest of Puerto Natales. The area is unpopulated and remote. The mountain was first ascended in March 1973 by Eric Shipton, Roger Perry and Peter Radcliffe.

=== Regional ===
The Andes feature about four areas of volcanic activity from north to south: the Northern Volcanic Zone, the Central Volcanic Zone, the Southern Volcanic Zone and the Austral Volcanic Zone. Aside from the main belt, so-called "back-arc" volcanism occurs as far as 250 kilometres (160 mi) behind the volcanic arc. These volcanic zones are separated by gaps lacking volcanic activity.

Volcanism in the region occurs because of the Southern Volcanic Zone and the Austral Volcanic Zone. These contain about 74 volcanoes with post-glacial activity; they include both monogenetic volcanoes, stratovolcanoes and volcanic complexes. Llaima and Villarrica are among the most active of these volcanoes. The Southern and Austral volcanic zones are separated by a gap without volcanic activity, close to the Chile Triple Junction.

The strongest volcanic eruption in the region occurred 7,750 years before present at Cerro Hudson volcano, which deposited tephra all over southern Patagonia and Tierra del Fuego. This eruption probably caused a major depopulation of Tierra del Fuego, the temporary disappearance of long-range obsidian trade, and a change in the prevalent lifestyles of the region.

=== Local ===
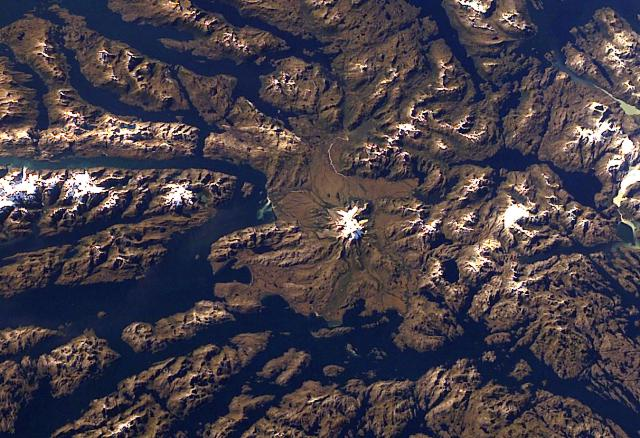
Monte Burney seen from space

Monte Burney is the most southern stratovolcano of the Austral Volcanic Zone. Six Quaternary volcanoes form this 800 kilometres (500 mi) long volcanic arc. The Antarctic Plate subducts beneath the South America Plate and the Scotia Plate at a pace of about 2 centimetres per year (0.79 in/year), causing the volcanism. The young age of the subducting crust (12-24 million years old) gives the volcanic rocks a unique chemical composition including adakitic rocks. The movement between the South America Plate and the Scotia Plate is taken up by strike-slip faulting. In terms of composition, Lautaro, Aguilera and Viedma form one group distinct from Burney, and Reclus lies between these two. 420 kilometres (260 mi) southeast of Monte Burney lies Fueguino, a volcanic field with possible historical activity in 1820 and 1712. Fueguino is the southernmost Holocene volcano in the Andes. Large explosive eruptions have occurred at Aguilera, Reclus and Burney but due to the long distance between these volcanoes and critical infrastructure they are considered a low hazard.

A 6 kilometres (3.7 mi) wide caldera lies in the area, which is partly filled by pyroclastic flows. Some of these flows extend outside the caldera. On the western rim of the caldera, the 1,758 metres (5,768 ft) high Monte Burney volcano developed. It is not a simple volcanic cone, has its own summit caldera with a crescent of spires, and a steep wall on the northern side with uncertain origin. This volcano features an ice cap, with a glacier extending between 688–1,123 metres (2,257–3,684 ft) of altitude. The total glacier volume is about 0.4 cubic kilometres (0.096 cu mi) and there might be rock glaciers as well. The volcano also shows traces of a sector collapse towards the south-southwest. Flank vents are also found and generated lava and pyroclastic flows. The rim of the larger caldera is taken up by a ring of lava domes. Glacial erosion has left a rugged landscape, which close to the volcano is smoothed by deposits coming from the volcano. The landscape east of the caldera is buried by pyroclastic flows, and some outcrops in them may be remnants of a pre-Burney volcano.

=== Composition ===
The flank vents have erupted andesite and dacite, belonging to a potassium-poor calcalkaline series. Such a limited range of composition is typical for these volcanoes but might reflect the small amount of research conducted on them. Tephras of rhyolitic composition were generated by Monte Burney during the Pleistocene, according to compositional data. Holocene eruptions have near-identical composition. Minerals found in Burney rocks include amphibole, plagioclase and pyroxene; foreign components include clinopyroxene and olivine crystals as well as granite xenoliths stemming from the Patagonian batholith.

Magnesium-poor adakites have been found at Monte Burney. Fueguino volcanic rocks also include adakites but these are richer in magnesium. These adakitic magmas reflect the subduction of a relatively hot and young Antarctic Plate. In the case of Monte Burney, these magmas then underwent some fractionation during ascent, as it was retarded by the tectonic regimen, which is somewhat compressive.

== Eruptive history ==
Eruptions occurred at Monte Burney during the Pleistocene. Two eruptions around 49,000 ± 500 and 48,000 ± 500 years before present deposited tephra in Laguna Potrok Aike, a lake approximately 300 kilometres (190 mi) east of Monte Burney; there they reach thicknesses of 48 centimetres (19 in) and 8 centimetres (3.1 in) respectively. Other Pleistocene eruptions are recorded there at 26,200 and 31,000 years ago, with additional eruptions having occurred during marine isotope stage 3. Holocene tephras from Monte Burney have also been found in this lake. According to the Potrok Aike record, Monte Burney may be the most active volcano in the region during the late Quaternary.

Radiocarbon dating and tephrochronology has evidenced Holocene activity at Burney. 2,320 ± 100 and 7,450 ± 500 BCE large Plinian eruptions with a volcanic explosivity index of 5 generated the MB2 and MB1 tephras, respectively. The date of the MB2 eruption is also given as 4,260 years before present; a more recent estimate is 4216+93
−193 years before present. Other dates are 8,425 ± 500 years before present for MB1 and 3,830 ± 390 or 3,820 ± 390 for MB2, both by radiocarbon dating.

These tephras have volumes exceeding 3 cubic kilometres (0.72 cu mi) for MB1 and 2.8 cubic kilometres (0.67 cu mi) for MB2 and are both of rhyolitic composition. It is possible that the MB1 eruption was actually two separate events with slightly distinct chemistries. The MB2 eruption may have formed the summit caldera as well as tephra deposits exceeding 5 metres (16 ft) of thickness east of the volcano. It probably reached Antarctica as well, as tephra layers in the Talos ice core in East Antarctica show a tephra layer of approximately the same age and composition to MB2. The MB2 tephra forms andosole soils around the Strait of Magellan. Soil acidification from tephras of the MB2 eruption lasted for millennia after the eruption on the basis of stalagmite data, and lake and peat sediments indicate that this soil acidification caused a decay of the Nothofagus vegetation in the area of Seno Skyring and Cerro Fox. Both the MB1 and MB2 eruptions may have affected the settlement patterns of prehistoric humans in the region, driving them to areas with more predictable resources. Vegetation changes at Lago Lynch may have also been caused by the Burney eruption but there climate change is considered to be a more likely driver. Fires leaving charcoal in bogs on Tierra del Fuego and a sulfate spike in an Antarctic ice core around 4,100 ± 100 years before present may have been caused by MB2. The MB2 ash spread in a southeasterly direction in comparison to the easterly MB1 ash. These ashes have also been found at Lake Arturo, the first discovery of them in the Argentine Tierra del Fuego, and in coastal sediment cores and dunes on Tierra del Fuego. Further findings were made at Ushuaia, Brunswick Peninsula, a number of other sites and for MB1 on the Falklands Islands about 950 kilometres (590 mi) away from Monte Burney. Tephras from Monte Burney and other volcanoes are important for tephrostratigraphy in the region of the Andes.

Further eruptions occurred 90 ± 100, 800 ± 500, 3,740 ± 10, 7,390 ± 200 BCE, and 1,529 ± 28, 1,944 ± 29, 10,015 and 1,735 years before present. The last two were small eruptions. Some of these eruptions have left traces in cave deposits south of Monte Burney. Tephra from an eruption that occurred about 2,000 years before present reached a thickness of 12 centimetres (4.7 in) in a peat bog 70 kilometres (43 mi) away from Monte Burney. One tephra around 1805 BCE found at the Siple Dome in Antarctica may be linked to Monte Burney but the timing of the tephra is problematic. Two tephras at Fiordo Vogel and Seno Skyring have been linked to Monte Burney; they are dated 4,254 ± 120 and 9,009 ± 17 - 9,175 ± 111 years before present. The younger of these two eruptions influenced sedimentation in these water bodies and the adjacent vegetation. A reworked tephra identified at Hooker's Point, East Falkland, may come from a mid-Holocene eruption that took place between the MB1 and MB2 events. Reports from natives, mentioned in 1847, of a volcano at the end of a bay that makes the ground tremble probably refer to Monte Burney, which is visible on clear days from Almirante Montt Gulf. In 1910 a researcher concluded that the volcano had been active in postglacial time, given that pumice formations found around the volcano would not have survived glaciation.

Only one historical eruption is known from Burney, which occurred in 1910. This eruption has a volcanic explosivity index of 2, and was observed by a merchant ship. This eruption appeared to coincide with an earthquake and tsunami on 24 June 1910 in the area. An unconfirmed report of an eruption in 1920 exists, as well as reports of a flash of light and earthquakes during the night of 24 June 1970. No reports of such activity were identified in the contemporaneous newspaper La Prensa Austral, however. Shallow seismic activity occurs to this day at Monte Burney.

== Climate ==
The climate of the Patagonian region is influenced both by the close distance to Antarctica and by the Southern Hemisphere Westerlies. Polar cold air outbreaks, cool ocean upwelling, orographic precipitation and the Antarctic Circumpolar Current further affect the regional climate.

About four stages of glaciation have been recognized in the area during the Pleistocene, although the glacial history is poorly known. Monte Burney was glaciated during the Last Glacial Maximum. During the early Holocene, glaciers retreated quickly then slowed down during the Antarctic Cold Reversal. A slight expansion is noted during the Little Ice Age.

== Research history ==
The mountain was already known before 1871; a book written in that year by Robert Oliver Cunningham records the following travel report mentioning Monte Burney:

the entire mass of a magnificent solitary mountain a little to the northward, in general shrouded more or less in mist, and the summit of which we had never seen, was revealed, without a cloud to dim the dazzling splendour of its jagged snowy peaks, the extensive snow-fields which clothed its sides and the deep blue crevassed glaciers which filled its gorges.

— Robert Oliver Cunningham,

The appearance of the mountain was considered "majestic" in 1899. Eric Shipton explored the area in 1962, and after a failed attempt in 1963 climbed Monte Burney on 10 March 1973, reaching its summit together with Peter Radcliffe and Roger Perry. Auer in 1974 did correlate some tephras on Tierra del Fuego with Monte Burney, one of which was later linked to Reclus. In 2015 the Chilean geological agency SERNAGEOMIN began setting up volcano monitoring equipment on Monte Burney, the first volcano in the Magallanes Patagonia region to be monitored.
