= Potrok Aike =

Lake in Santa Cruz Province, Argentina

- Location within Santa Cruz Province Location within Argentina
- Location: Pali-Aike Volcanic Field, Güer Aike Department, Santa Cruz Province, Argentina, in Patagonia
- Coordinates: 51°58′00″S 70°22′30″W
- Type: maar
- Basin countries: Argentina
- Max. length: 3.5 km (2.2 mi)
- Max. depth: 100 m (330 ft)
- Surface elevation: 113 m (371 ft)

Potrok Aike is a maar (a broad volcanic crater) in the Patagonian province of Santa Cruz, Argentina, which contains a brackish lake. It has a roughly square shape and is about 3.5 km (2.2 mi) wide. The lake is fed by groundwater and occasional inflows through dry valleys, and its water levels have fluctuated over the course of its 770,000-year-long history between overflow and near desiccation. Recent (past 51,000 years) climatic variability has left a series of terraces and shorelines, both around the lake and submerged under its waters. The variability is driven mainly by changes in wind speed, which change the evaporation rates. Usually, cold periods correlate to higher and warm periods to lower water levels in Potrok Aike.

The lake is embedded in a dry steppe region and is one of the few open water bodies there. It has been studied as a site for long drill cores and palaeoclimate records of the PASADO/SALSA project, which in 2002 and 2003 took about half a kilometre of drill cores from the lake. These drill cores were used to reconstruct the climate (temperature, wind and precipitation) and environment of the region, including volcanic activity and changes in Earth's magnetic field.

The region around Potrok Aike was periodically glaciated before the maar formed, but later glaciations did no longer reach it. Sparse volcanic activity built the Pali-Aike volcanic field, which was active until 10,000 years ago east of Potrok Aike. About 12,500 years ago humans first arrived in Patagonia. They used the resources around Potrok Aike, including rockshelters, to dismember animal kills. The lake itself is inhabited by algae and underwater plants.

== Etymology and human geography ==
The name is part-Tehuelche and part-Spanish: Spanish potro means 'foal', and Tehuelche aike means a place where people stop and store resources. This may indicate that Potrok Aike was a stopping point for local people, as it has a reliable water supply. The region was inhabited by Tehuelche people before Westerners arrived at the end of the 19th century. (Note: Numerous expeditions passed close to the lake.) Sheep grazing is widespread in the region.

Politically, Potrok Aike is in Argentina's Santa Cruz Province. The lake can be reached from the National Route 40 between Río Gallegos and Río Turbio, which passes about 20 km (12 mi) north of Potrok Aike. The border to Chile is about 5 km (3.1 mi) south of Potrok Aike. The "Diego Ritchie" police station lies southwest of the lake, a weather station about 1 km (0.62 mi) northwest and there is a field station of Argentina's National Agricultural Technology Institute.

== Geography and hydrology ==
Potrok Aike is a 3.5 km (2.2 mi) wide, roughly square-shaped lake in southern Patagonia, 80 km (50 mi) north of the Strait of Magellan and 85 km (53 mi) west of Río Gallegos. There are few permanent lakes in this region; another one is Laguna Azul.

The lake has a shape resembling a simple pot, typical for volcanic lakes, and covers a surface area of 761 hectares (1,880 acres) at about 113 m (371 ft) above sea level. The lake floor has a bowl shape, with a shallow platform at 30–35 m (98–115 ft) depth, a steep drop to 90 m (300 ft) depth and a flat lake floor at 100 m (330 ft) depth. Water levels fluctuate up to 1 m (3 ft 3 in) between seasons; interannual variability reaches 2 metres (6 ft 7 in). The lake is a 5 km (3.1 mi) wide and 50 m (160 ft) deep (from above Potrok Aike's water surface) volcanic crater embedded within flat terrain.

Beaches are formed by pebbles, sand and silt; there are gravel ridges formed by longshore transport. Water currents eroded the eastern coast. Potrok Aike is surrounded by flights of lacustrine terraces, both above and below the present-day water level; the highest paleoshoreline is 21 m (69 ft) above the present-day lake surface. Alluvial fans developed on the terraces, while wind moves sediments to form dunes. Submerged shorelines including submerged beach ridges are found at 20–45 m (66–148 ft) depth, and there are erosional unconformities formed by past lowstands. A now-submerged river delta may occur in the southeastern part of the lake. The "Policía" scoria cone and "Bandurrias" lava flow crop out on the southwestern corner of the lake and have been eroded by waves. At higher water levels, large embayments would form in the northwestern and southwestern parts of the lake, and a small bay on the eastern side.

=== Hydrology and watershed geomorphology ===
The waters of the lake are well-mixed by wind, which can form waves up to 1.5 m (4 ft 11 in) high and produces a water circulation in Potrok Aike that erodes lakefloor sediments. Water temperatures range between 4–10 °C (39–50 °F) with little differences by depth; temperatures exceeding 10 °C (50 °F) are rare. (Note: Unlike more sheltered lakes like Laguna Azul where temperatures can reach 18 °C (64 °F).) The lake contains about 0.414 cubic kilometres (0.099 cu mi) of brackish water (2.2–2.5 grams per litre (0.35–0.40 oz/imp gal) salinity), with a high dissolved oxygen content throughout the water column (Note: But not into the sediments.) and a medium to high concentration of nutrients like phosphorus. (Note: Probably derived from groundwater.) The Secchi depth is about 6–7 m (20–23 ft). Being a closed lake, water levels (Note: The steep slopes of the basin mean that even large water level changes do not produce large surface area changes.) fluctuate with climate conditions and also with the conditions of the surrounding landscape (evapotranspiration, permeability changes caused by permafrost etc.); rising/falling temperature, stronger or more westerly winds/weaker or more easterly winds and lower/higher precipitation decrease/increase water levels, while cloud cover plays a subordinate role.

The watershed area covers more than 200 square kilometres (77 sq mi) and reaches into Chilean territory; the ephemeral Bandurrias Creek enters (Note: Bandurrias Creek may have drained to the Río Gallegos via the Robles Creek before the formation of Potrok Aike, which would have captured its drainage.) Potrok Aike from the west through an U-shaped cascade. Especially on the eastern side there are arroyos, some of which cut lake terraces and which carry water mainly during snowmelt. There is significant groundwater inflow which buffers water levels although its exact significance to water levels is unclear. About half of its inflow seeps out through groundwater.

Most of the terrain is formed by moraines and outwash fans of the "Patagonian Gravel" Formation, with outcrops of the underlying Santa Cruz Formation in the southern lake terraces. Lava plateaus, maars and scoria cones are widespread. Numerous ephemeral lakes and dunes formed by lake sediments dot the landscape around Potrok Aike; unlike them, the great depth of Potrok Aike keeps it water-filled year round. Former meltwater channels from ancient glaciations, one of which passes just west of Potrok Aike and is occupied by Robles Creek and Bandurrias Creek, cross the region. The area is arid, has not been glaciated for 800,000 years and volcanic activity has been minor, leaving wind and cryogenic processes as the only landscape forming agents; it is thus well-conserved.

=== Sediments ===
The bottom of the lake is covered by up to 400 m (1,300 ft) thick sediments. They are mostly carbonates, along with wind-blown and suspended material. In cores, they appear as ball and pillow structures, laminated silts, laminated silts with embedded silt and sand layers, lightly coloured silt layers, normally graded beds, and sand with fine gravel layers and no other structure. Concretions formed perhaps by microbial activity, mollusc shells, microfossils, plant remains (including phytoliths) and infrequent vivianite concretions complete the sediment package of Potrok Aike. The cold conditions allow the precipitation of ikaite, a warmth-sensitive carbonate mineral, on objects like submerged plants and mooring lines. Sedimentation rates during the past 60,000 years were remarkably constant at 1.21 ± 0.02 metres per millennium (3.970 ± 0.066 ft/ka), with higher sedimentation rates before that and no evidence of gaps in the record. The sediments bear traces of frequent redeposition and mass flows.

Ninety–four volcanic ash layers have been emplaced in Potrok Aike during the past 80,000 years, mostly by volcanoes of the Andean Austral Volcanic Zone such as Aguilera, Lautaro/Viedma, (Note: Viedma and Lautaro tephras are difficult to distinguish by composition alone.) Monte Burney and Reclus. Monte Burney is the main source of tephra at Potrok Aike. Cerro Hudson in the Southern Volcanic Zone also emplaced one tephra during the H1 eruption; its H2 eruption has not been identified at Potrok Aike. No tephra deposits have been attributed to the Pali-Aike volcanic field, probably because it is downwind from the lake. Whether peaks in tephra deposition between 72,000–38,000 and 25,000–19,000 years ago reflect an increase of volcanic activity or increased tephra arrival at Potrok Aike is unclear; for Hudson tephras decreased arrival is the likely cause. Some of the eruptions, in particular the late glacial Monte Burney eruption, severely impacted the lake's surroundings. Several tephra layers were remobilized on land or reworked after deposition in the lake, and thus appear as multiple layers,

== Geology and geological history ==
Potrok Aike is a maar that formed 770,000 ± 240,000 years ago during a phreatomagmatic eruption, when ascending magma interacted with groundwater. Intense explosions yielded a deep diatreme, now partly filled by the sediments on the floor of Potrok Aike. Phreatomagmatic (Note: Also described as hyaloclastite.) deposits of the eruption crop out east and southeast of Potrok Aike, and in gullies. The intersection of two tectonic lineaments close to Potrok Aike may have directed magma ascent there, and plentiful groundwater in the area facilitated the development of a maar. If the volcanic eruption took place during a glaciation, magma–ice interaction might be responsible for Potrok Aike's large size. After its formation, wave erosion and gravitational slumping would have expanded the water surface, explaining why Potrok Aike has no tephra ring and why it is one of the largest maars in the world.

It is part of the 3,000–4,500 square kilometres (1,200–1,700 sq mi) Pali-Aike volcanic field in the back-arc of the Andes. Other volcanic landforms around Potrok Aike are three vents northwest of the lake, an older, 1.19 million years old basaltic lava flow (Note: It is a weakly jointed alkali basalt that emanated from a heavily eroded scoria cone on the southwestern shore of the lake.) at the southwestern shore of the lake, the Sombrero Mexicano and Hito XXII cones also southeast of Potrok Aike, and the Miocene "Bella Vista Basalts" west of the lake. Potrok Aike is in the older, western portion of the Pali-Aike volcanic field; more recent volcanic activity took place in its eastern parts 10,000 years ago. Volcanic rocks erupted by Potrok Aike contain peridotite xenoliths derived from the mantle, whose formation began during the Paleoproterozoic 2.5 billion years ago.

=== Geological history ===
Before Potrok Aike formed, the various Plio-Pleistocene (Note: Between 3.5 and 1 million years ago.) Patagonian glaciers spread into the area from the west (Andes) and the south (Strait of Magellan, Seno Skyring and Seno Otway) and left moraines and glacial sediments. The sediments deposited by the largest of these glaciations have been named "Potrok Aike Drift" (Note: There are good outcrops of the deposits around Potrok Aike, including erratic blocks, hence the name.) or "Sierra de los Frailes Drift" and were emplaced by a glacier propagating from the Seno Otway. The youngest glacial deposits are 760,000 years old and belong to the Río Ci Aike/Cabo Vírgenes glaciations; later advances, such as the Last Glacial Maximum Llanquihue Glaciation did not reach the area and thus did not fill the maar in.

Potrok Aike might have dried up before 53,500 years ago during marine isotope stage 4, (Note: Perhaps declining sea levels caused groundwater to flow out.) perhaps allowing wind to remove lakefloor sediments and form dunes on the lake floor. The lake was continuously water filled during the past 45,000 years, frequently reaching a level of 21 m (69 ft) above present-day, where it would overflow to the northwest into the Río Gallegos via a northward flowing drainage named Chorrillo Carlota creek or Río Robes. Overflow was active between 49,000–44,000 and 34,000–17,000 years ago. Between 34,000–44,000 years ago, lake levels decreased and its biological productivity increased perhaps concomitant to warming in Antarctica. Water levels dropped 9,600–9,300 years ago during the Holocene as winds increased and remained 33 m (108 ft) below the present-day level. Beginning 7,000 years ago, water levels increased again, with cold and wet periods occurring 4,800, 3,900–3,700, 3,000 and 2,500 years ago. The past two millennia were highly dynamic, with a lowstand during the Medieval Climate Anomaly that correlates with a dry period in the North American Great Basin, overflow during the Little Ice Age, and another decrease since its end.

Other events in its history include:

- The warming and retreat of glaciers after the last glacial maximum was uneven, with slowdowns and speedups. The Antarctic Cold Reversal is noted by a cooling of about 3–4 °C (37–39 °F) at Potrok Aike, while the Younger Dryas does not appear in temperature reconstructions but appears in the sediments. The sediments also record the A2 and A1 warmings in Antarctica between 36,000–48,000 years ago.
- Wind speeds were low during the last glacial maximum, then increased during the late glacial in the Bolling-Allerod. During the early Holocene winds were weaker, then strengthened again during the middle and late Holocene. During the Little Ice Age, winds decreased at Potrok Aike. The position and strength of the Southern Hemisphere westerlies is governed by changes in insolation and the intertropical convergence zone.
- The main sources of lake sediments have varied over time: Outside input dominated between 11,500–9,600 and before 13,500 years ago, (Note: The increased carbonate input was originally interpreted as a sign of a water level drop.) and carbonate sedimentation decreased 6,900 years ago and paused altogether during the Little Ice Age.
- Organic matter accumulation increased during interglacial stages, like between 50,000–49,000, 47,800–45,000, 39,200–36,500, 17,200–16,000, 15,000–14,400 years ago, when increased precipitation, warmer surface water and increased nutrient input stimulated growth in the lake, while the opposite changes occur during glacial periods. Runoff from remnant permafrost contributed to the late glacial peak in productivity. An exception is during 16,000–14,000, when Potrok Aike was impacted by a major eruption of Monte Burney volcano. Oxygen concentrations have been stable for the past 51,200 years.
- Dust deposition records at Potrok Aike resemble these in Antarctica, reflecting the common source regions. Dust deposition decreased during Heinrich event 1 in both Potrok Aike and elsewhere in the Southern Hemisphere, probably due to a wetter atmosphere washing out dust before it can reach these places.
- The sediments bear traces of secular variation of Earth's magnetic field, including several Holocene changes in inclination and intensity that have been recorded at other sites around the world. Excursions noted at Potrok Aike are the Laschamp excursion 40,700 ± 1,000 years ago, the Mono Lake excursion 32,400 ± 300 years ago and two changes 46,000 and 20,000 years ago. The latter of which may correspond to the so-called "Hilina Pali excursion". Such records could be used to calibrate paleomagnetic dating.
- About ten mass movements have been identified in Potrok Aike with magnetic techniques, appearing to correspond to episodes of climate warming, while other Holocene deposits coincide with lake level drops. Some subaqueous mass flows were originally attributed to ancient earthquakes, but most were probably caused by rapid drops of water levels which destabilized the sediments. Increased gustiness may play a role as well.
- Pollen data indicate that Andean forests (Nothofagus) persisted in small areas during the last ice age, and expanded again after it ended. During the Holocene, pollen changes reflect moisture (after 2,500 years ago, when increased precipitation drove an expansion of the Andean forest) or wind changes. Beginning in the 19th century, pollen of introduced plants appears in Potrok Aike, concomitant with the European expansion in the region.
- Charcoal records at Potrok Aike show wildfire activity both in the Andes and around the lake. They indicate a peak in steppe fire activity between 13,000–11,000 years ago, followed by stable conditions. A fire event around 1600 AD was possibly caused by drought in the Andes.

== Ecosystem ==
Pondweed and water milfoil form dense subaqueous "forests" at 1.5–20 m (4 ft 11 in – 65 ft 7 in) depth, below the base of waves. Other subaqueous plants include Blindia/Drepanocladus/Vittia mosses and widgeonweeds. Pond snails dwell on the lakefloor above 12 m (39 ft) depth, and molluscs thrive in the calmer waters of the shallow terraces. Microbial life in the lake waters is dominated by chlorophytes, cyanobacteria, diatoms (Note: The diatom species Cymbella gravida, Thalassiosira patagonica, and the genus and species Corbellia contorta were discovered at Potrok Aike.) and Euglena, with the main species changing over time. The biological productivity of the lake waters is low owing to its salinity, turbulence, chloride excess and nitrogen deficiency. Various microbial communities, including archaea and bacteria live in the lake sediments; the communities develop during sediment emplacement and thus their species composition and lifestyle (e.g syntrophy, sulfate reduction, methanogenesis, fermentation, denitrification and acetogenesis) varies depending on the age of the sediment. Biological activity in Potrok Aike varied over time. It reached a maximum during the Late Glacial, (Note: With individual peaks during Antarctic warm events.) when winds were weaker, the water surface warmed up significantly during summer and there was active inflow.

The lake is surrounded by the Patagonian steppe formed by tussock grasses like Festuca gracillima and (south of Potrok Aike) Festuca pallescens. While the beaches and flooded shores are unvegetated, small bushes and trees grow on the terraces around Potrok Aike:

- Acaena grows on the lowest terraces.
- The higher terraces are dominated by Adesmia boronioides shrubs on the western side.
- On the northern, southern and eastern terraces, a vegetation community characterized by Berberis heterophylla bushes, Azorella filamentosa/Colobanthus subulatus/Nardophyllum bryoides cushion plants, Festuca/Poa/Stipa grasses and Peretia recurvata dominates vegetation.

The northwestern shore has isolated occurrences of red crowberry. Peat is forming in some places. Major changes during the past 51,000 years are unlikely - at best, vegetation decreased or turned into tundra during the last glacial maximum - but the introduction of sheep around 1880 AD caused overgrazing and soil erosion in the region.

Common animals in the region include grey wolf, guanacos, Humboldt's hog-nosed skunk, a weasel species and numerous birds (Note: Black-necked swans, bustards, crested caracaras, Darwin's rheas, ducks, eagles, falcons, ibises and owls.) and rodents. On the north-northeastern side of the lake, fragments of Miocene animal fossils have been found; they include the notoungulates Pachyrukhos and Protypotherium, and the glyptodont Propalaehoplophorus.

== Climate ==
Climate data for Potrok Aike
Month	Jan	Feb	Mar	Apr	May	Jun	Jul	Aug	Sep	Oct	Nov	Dec	Year
Record high °C (°F)	31.4 (88.5)	29.7 (85.5)	30.2 (86.4)	22.4 (72.3)	18.2 (64.8)	14.4 (57.9)	13.0 (55.4)	15.1 (59.2)	20.1 (68.2)	23.3 (73.9)	26.3 (79.3)	31.4 (88.5)	31.4 (88.5)
Mean daily maximum °C (°F)	17.6 (63.7)	17.4 (63.3)	15.1 (59.2)	11.4 (52.5)	6.5 (43.7)	3.2 (37.8)	3.1 (37.6)	5.3 (41.5)	9.8 (49.6)	12.7 (54.9)	14.7 (58.5)	16.3 (61.3)	11.9 (53.4)
Daily mean °C (°F)	11.5 (52.7)	11.1 (52.0)	9.2 (48.6)	6.1 (43.0)	2.5 (36.5)	0.2 (32.4)	0.1 (32.2)	1.5 (34.7)	4.5 (40.1)	6.6 (43.9)	8.6 (47.5)	10.4 (50.7)	6.7 (44.1)
Mean daily minimum °C (°F)	5.4 (41.7)	5.0 (41.0)	3.6 (38.5)	1.2 (34.2)	−1.4 (29.5)	−3.0 (26.6)	−3.0 (26.6)	−1.9 (28.6)	−0.2 (31.6)	0.7 (33.3)	2.2 (36.0)	4.5 (40.1)	1.6 (34.9)
Record low °C (°F)	−5.1 (22.8)	−4.7 (23.5)	−7.8 (18.0)	−7.3 (18.9)	−11.4 (11.5)	−16.8 (1.8)	−18.2 (−0.8)	−16.4 (2.5)	−12.4 (9.7)	−6.0 (21.2)	−6.0 (21.2)	−2.2 (28.0)	−18.2 (−0.8)
Average rainfall mm (inches)	19.6 (0.77)	19.1 (0.75)	20.8 (0.82)	19.6 (0.77)	13.9 (0.55)	13.2 (0.52)	12.5 (0.49)	12.8 (0.50)	9.8 (0.39)	13.4 (0.53)	16.7 (0.66)	18.7 (0.74)	162.6 (6.40)
Average relative humidity (%)	58.6	60.0	64.9	70.8	77.9	81.6	80.3	76.9	70.1	63.4	58.8	57.9	67.7

The climate of the region is cold and arid, with a mean annual temperature of 7 °C (45 °F). Precipitation does not exceed 200 millimetres (7.9 in), with year-to-year variations reaching 50 mm (2.0 in). The Southern Hemisphere westerlies, which blow between the subtropical anticyclones of the Pacific Ocean and Atlantic Ocean on the one side and the subpolar troughs on the other, control the regional climate: (Note: The core of the westerlies migrates north and south with the seasons. Farther south is the Antarctic Convergence.) Winds blow mainly from the west, with average speeds of 7.4 metres per second (24 ft/s) peaking in summer, sometimes causing storms on the lake; only 0.5% of days are calm. Owing to the winds, Potrok Aike does not freeze over in winter except sometimes at its edges. The potent rain shadow cast by the Andes is responsible for the aridity. Most precipitation occurs when the westerlies weaken and easterly moisture from the Atlantic Ocean reaches the region, although the higher frequency of westerly winds means that most precipitation still occurs during westerly conditions. Past lake level changes occurred when the westerlies shifted either north or south of Potrok Aike. Evaporation rates exceed precipitation by a factor of about 24. Relative humidity peaks during winter and reaches a minimum during summer. Whether climate oscillations like the El Niño-Southern Oscillation or the Southern Annular Mode play a role in the local climate is unclear. Runoff occurs during spring, when snow melts.

During the Last Glacial Maximum, climate conditions were significantly different around Potrok Aike; permafrost formed and increased runoff into the lake, winds slowed and colder temperatures might have led to the development of seasonal ice cover. (Note: The occurrence of probable dropstones on the lake floor supports this view.) This would have decreased evaporation, causing water levels to rise, while the southward shift of the westerlies during the ice age increased precipitation at Potrok Aike. Dust deposition increased at the lake and the surrounding oceans during that time. During the late glacial, mean air temperatures reached 9 °C (48 °F). (Note: The source says these were the coldest temperatures at Potrok Aike in the past 16,000 years, but gives lower temperatures for the present-day.) At the beginning of the Holocene, the westerlies retreated poleward as Antarctic sea ice decreased, reaching Potrok Aike around 9,300 years ago and causing the steep lake level drop. Simultaneously temperatures rose to a maximum of 12.2 °C (54.0 °F) between 10,400–3,500 years ago. They then declined until present-day. A temporary weakening of the westerlies during the Little Ice Age drove the rise of water levels at that time. Palaeoclimate records at Potrok Aike are not always congruent with records obtained from sites closer to the Andes.

== Research ==
The lake is the subject of an international research effort known as the "Potrok Aike maar lake Sediment Archive Drilling prOject" (PASADO), which is part of the International Continental Scientific Drilling Program and of the "South American Lake Sediment Archives and Modeling" (SALSA) project. The Potrok Aike project began in 1999, when field trips searching suitable sites for the German Climate Research Program identified Potrok Aike as a good candidate site. (Note: Potrok Aike and Patagonia more generally are among the few parts of Earth south of the 38th parallel south and thus the only place where there are land-based records of Southern Ocean climate, dust fluxes and Southern Hemisphere westerlies, and Patagonia is the southernmost landmass outside of Antarctica. Moreover, the record at Potrok Aike goes back much longer than at other Patagonian sites, which were frequently covered by ice during the last glacial maximum) In 2002 gravity cores were obtained from the lake, with piston cores coming in the following year. A field camp nicknamed "Potrok City" was built for the research project. In total, seven (Note: Some initial drilling efforts aimed at creating the financial and scientific incentives for deep drilling.) drill cores were taken from Potrok Aike. The PASADO hydraulic piston cores 5022-1 and 5022-2 were obtained from the deep lake basin. The gravity and piston cores PTA-03/12+13, PTA-02/3, PTA-02/4, PTA-02/5 also come from there, while PTA-03/6 and PTA-03/5 are derived from shallower waters off the northern shoreline and PTA-02/2 and PTA-02/1 from slopes off the northwestern coast. The drilling operations originally intended to obtain cores spanning 700,000 years, but bad weather and technical difficulties forced researchers to settle for a much shorter timeframe of 51,000 years and to abandon efforts to investigate the volcanic basement. The cores have a combined length exceeding 0.5 km (0.31 mi) and are stored at the University of Berlin. The resolution of the cores is about 1–10 years.

The objectives of the PASADO project included obtaining data on palaeoclimate, (Note: Dust and hydrology changes, temperature and precipitation variations. They were to be determined with multiple techniques like biomarkers, chironomids, diatoms, dust deposition, pollen and stable isotopes, as well as through comparisons with marine and continental ice sheet records, the outputs of palaeoclimate modelling and comparisons with other water bodies in the region like Cardiel Lake and Cari Laufquén.) former vegetation and wildfire (Note: Using charcoal and pollen.) conditions, volcanic activity and studies on phreatomagmatic volcanism, variations of Earth's magnetic field and the activity of underground ecosystems. Lastly, they sought to establish a reliable chronology through magnetic and tephrochronological methods, and reliable palaeo proxies through comparisons with extant conditions.

Research on Potrok Aike yielded insights in climate, dating, geology and hydrology and have been used in various disciplines of regional research. Techniques used included biological, geochemical, magnetic, mineralogical (including microbiological), physical and sedimentological procedures, as well as comparisons to climate models and ecology reconstructions. At its beginning, the effort involved Argentine, German and Swiss scientists, later expanding to include technical personnel and researchers from Argentina, Canada, Germany, Sweden, Switzerland and the USA. The challenges encountered at Potrok Aike led to the development of new lake sediment drilling techniques and the adoption of standards used in marine core studies. Palaeoclimate research at Potrok Aike has an economic dimension, as the regional economy is vulnerable to short-term droughts.

Apart from PASADO, earlier studies were carried out on Potrok Aike to obtain data on its past hydrology, climate and archaeology, and there have been later, independent research efforts. Palaeoclimate research in the region's lakes began at Magallanes Maar and continued at Potrok Aike and Laguna Azul.

== Archaeology ==
Numerous traces of prior human habitation have been found around Potrok Aike, especially on the uppermost terraces, and rock art (Note: Potrok Aike is one of the few sites in the region where rock paintings and engravings occur in the same place, perhaps because it is one of the few water sources there.) is widespread in the area. Potrok Aike played a major role in the human landscape of the region, as it was an important source of water and raw materials. The region was easily traversable and Potrok Aike accessible from other major sites like Cueva Fell or the Río Gallegos. The lake was inhabited for a long time; the oldest dated site is about 4,800 years old and was discovered in eroding dunes on the northeastern shore. Other sites with archaeological remains lie 3–4 km (1.9–2.5 mi) northwest of Potrok Aike, including sophisticated rock paintings.

The so-called "Potrok Aike type" or "PKA", a rock type frequently used in tools found at archaeological sites in the region, is named after the frequent findings close to Potrok Aike (Note: Whether the name refers to the lake Potrok Aike or a dry lake west of Potrok Aike with the same name is unclear. "PKA" is included in the so-called "Rocas de Grano Fino Oscuro", which occurs at Potrok Aike in higher quantities and larger blocks than elsewhere, and black dacite nodules have been found close to Potrok Aike.) although it is not exclusive to that lake. Found in glaciofluvial deposits of the region, it is a high-quality dacite and the most commonly used raw material for tool making in the region. Artefacts of chalcedony and green obsidian have been found at Potrok Aike, but the sources of these rocks are unknown.

The region was first inhabited 12,500 years ago. Four or five or four phases of settlement are recognized; during the last 4,500 years, a widespread hunter-gatherer culture in the region which exploited the plentiful natural resources like wood (Note: Inhabitants obtained firewood from barberries that grew in sheltered areas.) and water. Humans hunted and hunt preferably guanacos; rheas are hunted when their fat levels are higher than the guanaco's. Human responses to climate variability were complex and varied by region.

=== Alero Potrok Aike 1 ===
In 1982, three rock shelters were discovered close to the southern shore of the lake. The largest has a surface of 13.3 square metres (143 sq ft) and is within the Policia scoria cone. They yielded animal bones (mainly guanacos), hearths, lithic artefacts and rock art. Lithic nuclei have been recovered. Stone tools include flakes, knives, projectile points, racloirs, scrapers and tools for cutting wood. The rock art was made with red and white colours and depicts anthropomorphic drawings, simple geometrical signs and bird footsteps, consistent with other rock art in the regional "Río Chico" style. In the largest rockshelter, several stratigraphic layers consisting of guano and sand have been distinguished. Occupation began about 524–347 BCE during the fourth (Note: Findings at Potrok Aike were instrumental in showing that the fourth and fifth settlement periods were in fact the same.) settlement period and continued into recent times as demonstrated by the finding of an iron, but was discontinuous especially during times of less suitable climates.

The rockshelter was probably a place where lithic tools were produced and hunters gathered and exploited their guanaco kills. The rockshelter was not a permanent dwelling, however, and humans remained there for only short timespans. Rather, people then lived in tents which had several advantages over rock shelters. Findings of scallops in the rockshelter imply that there was long-distance trade between Potrok Aike and the ocean coasts. There is evidence that climatic fluctuations influenced population density in the region, with decreased activity during the dry Medieval Climate Anomaly, but that the rockshelter was used particularly during times of climatic instability - perhaps reflecting adaptations of the local population.
