= Potrok =

Potrok or POTROK may refer to:

- President of the Republic of Korea, the head of state of South Korea
- Potrok Aike, a body of water in Argentina
