= Peel Fjord =

Fjord in Chile

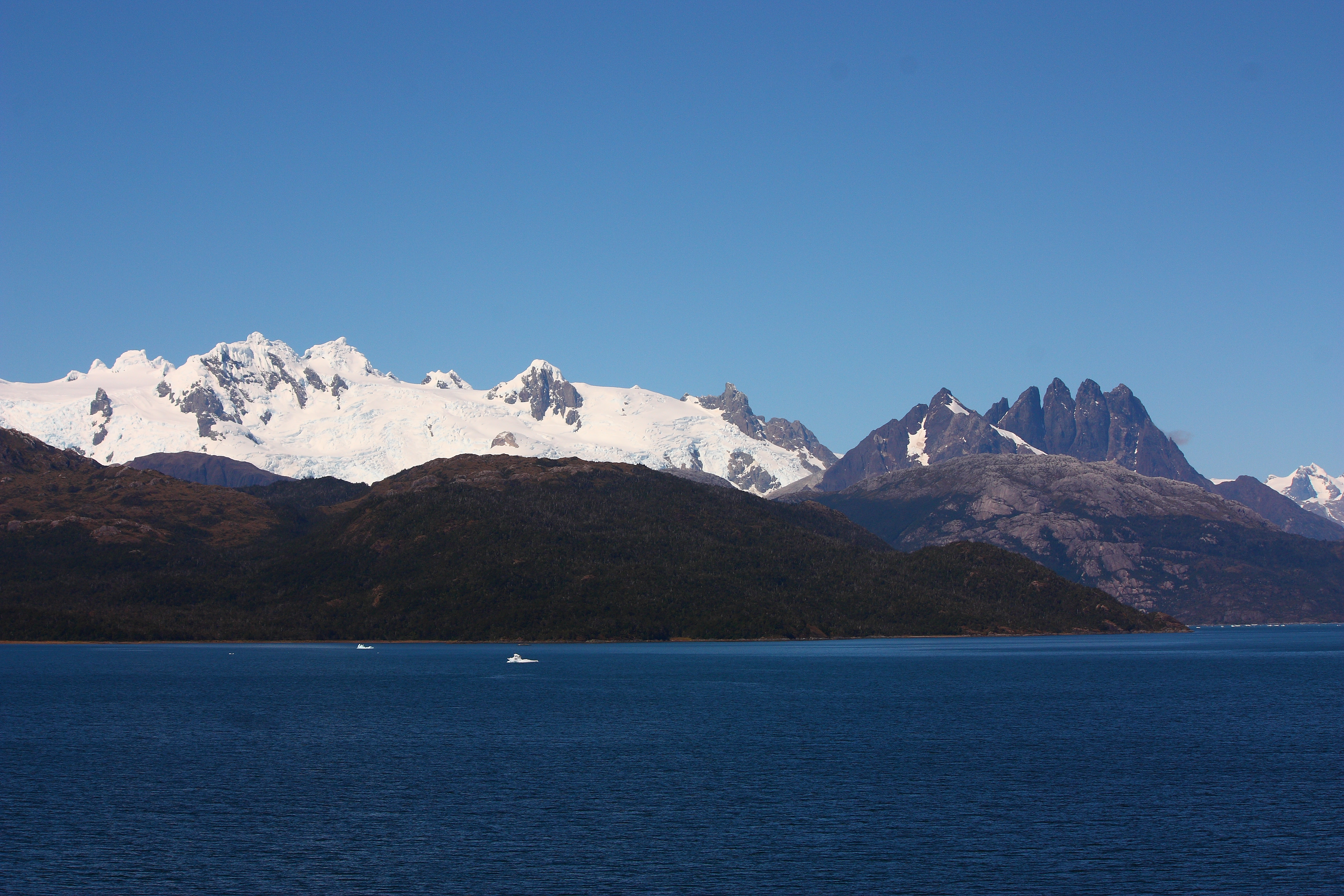
Amalia Fjord

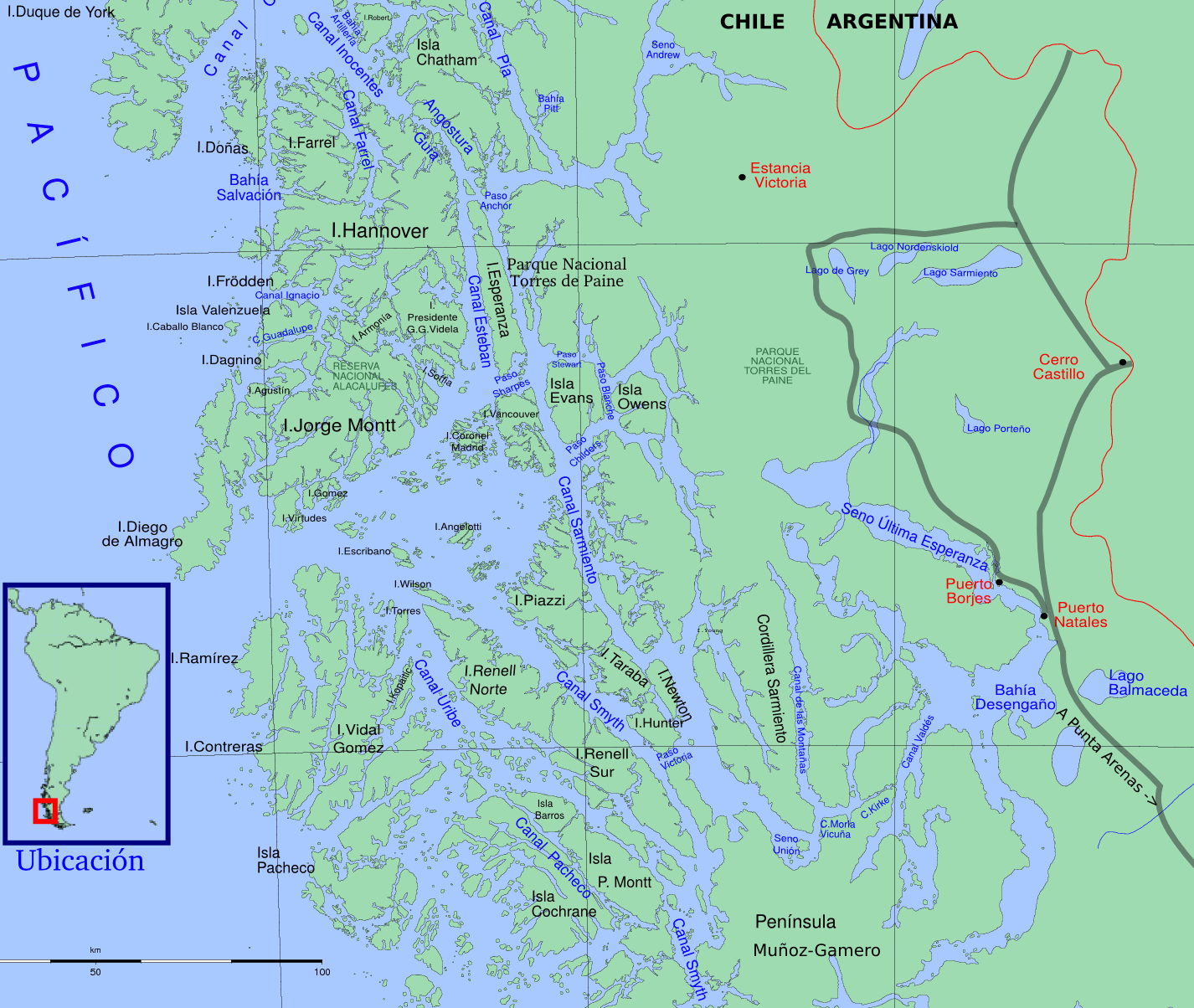
map

Peel Fjord is a fjord in Chile. It branches off from the Sarmiento Channel and is located at 50°52′S 74°0′W.

The east side of the fjord has three side fjords, named Amalia, Asia and Calvo. At the head of Amalia Fjord is Amalia Glacier. El Brujo Glacier is found in Asia Fjord, which is another glacier spilling from the Southern Patagonian Ice Field. Calvo Fjord splits into several arms towards which also descend glaciers.
