= Muñoz Gamero Peninsula =

Peninsula in Chile

Coordinates: 52°32′S 73°13′W

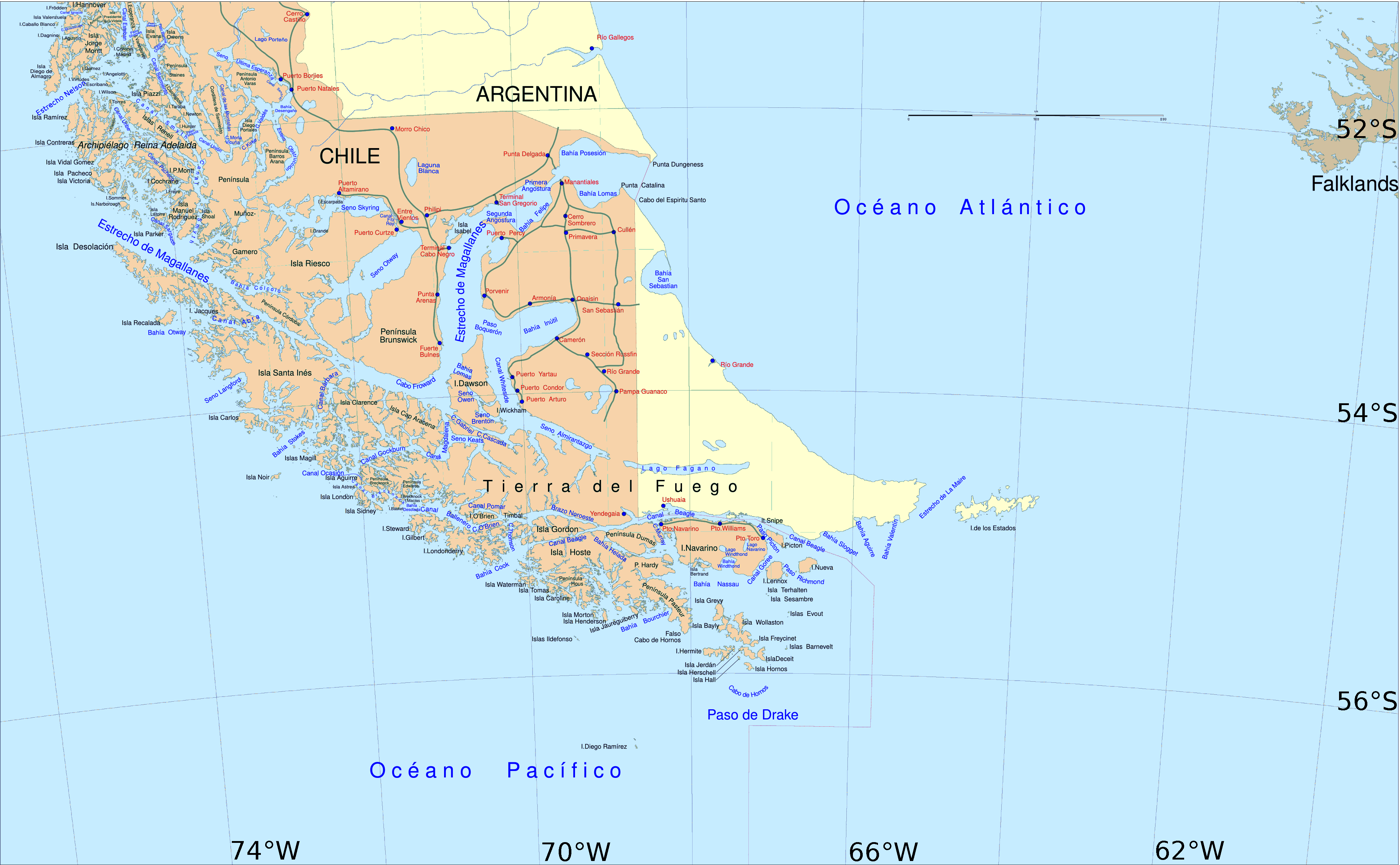
Overview Map with Muñoz Gamero Peninsula.

Muñoz Gamero Peninsula (Spanish: Península Muñoz Gamero) is a peninsula in Chile. It is bordered on the west by the Smyth Channel and is connected to the Patagonia mainland by a narrow isthmus, between Skyring Sound to the south and the Obstrucción estuary to the north. The peninsula consists of several smaller peninsulas jutting from its central land mass. Riesco Island was considered part of this peninsula until 1904. The lake that occupies a significant part of its central portion was discovered in 1945. The peninsula is home to Monte Burney and Gran Campo Nevado.

There have so far been two attempts to settle the peninsula, the first at fin de siècle and a second during the presidency of Eduardo Frei Montalva (1964–1970). Environmental conditions (high humidity) makes the area unsuitable for sheep and cattle farming.

The peninsula is named after Benjamín Muñoz Gamero (1817–1851).
