= Amalia Glacier =

Glacier in Chile

- Skua Glacier
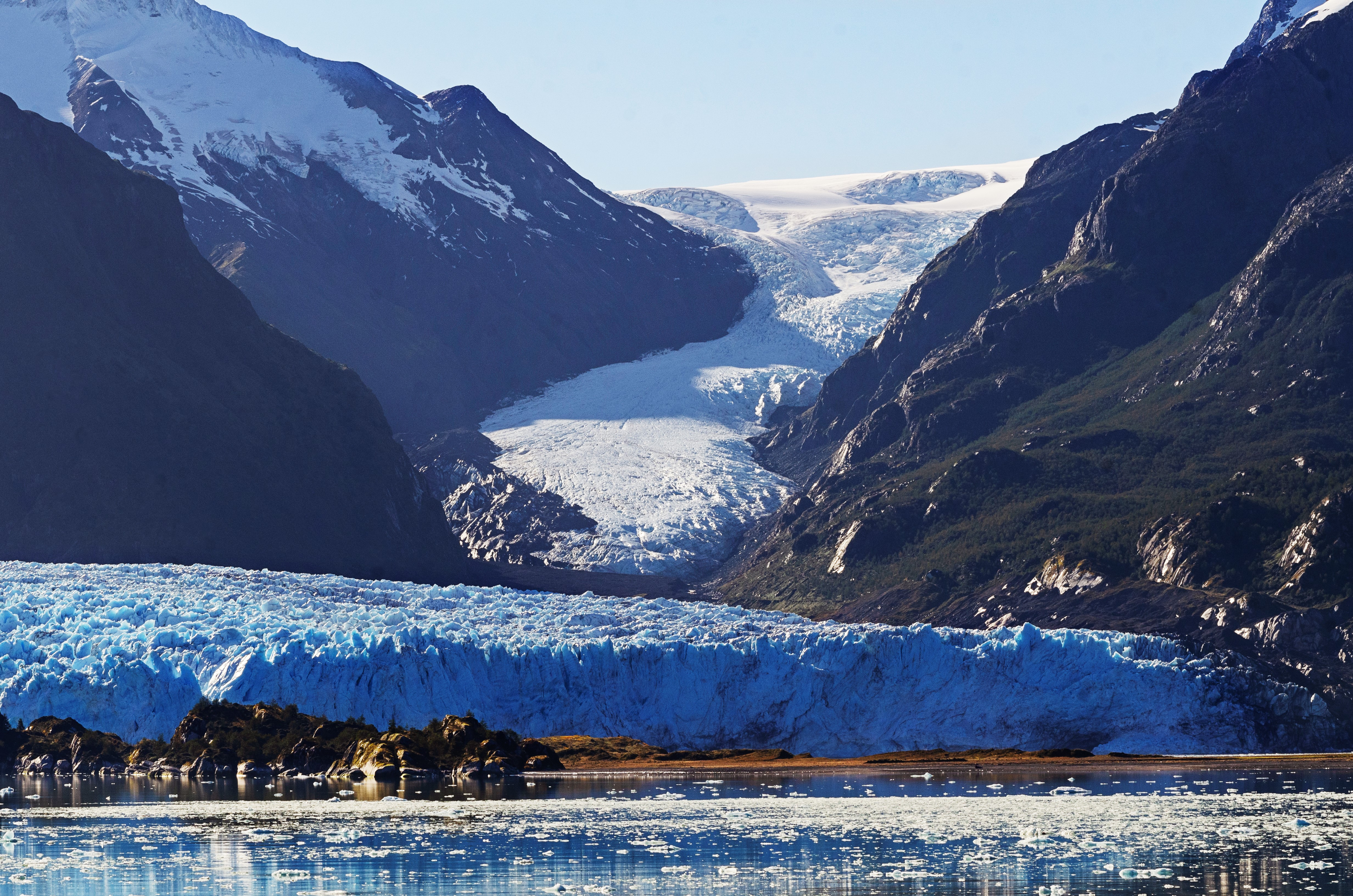
- Amalia Glacier in 2019

- Location within Chile
- Type: Tidewater glacier
- Location: Chile
- Coordinates: 50°55′S 73°37′W
- Area: 158 km^{2} (61 sq mi)
- Length: 21 km (13 mi)
- Status: Retreating

Amalia Glacier, also known as Skua Glacier, is a tidewater glacier located in Bernardo O'Higgins National Park, Chile, on the edge of the Sarmiento Channel. The glacier originates in the Southern Patagonian Ice Field. From 1945 to 1986, its terminus retreated 7 km (4.3 mi), being, along with the recession of the O'Higgins Glacier, the most dramatic retreat of the glaciers of the mentioned icefield during that period.

The glacier partially surrounds Reclus volcano and erodes the northern flank of it.

== See also ==
- Retreat of glaciers since 1850
