= Snow mushroom =

Large accumulation of compacted snow

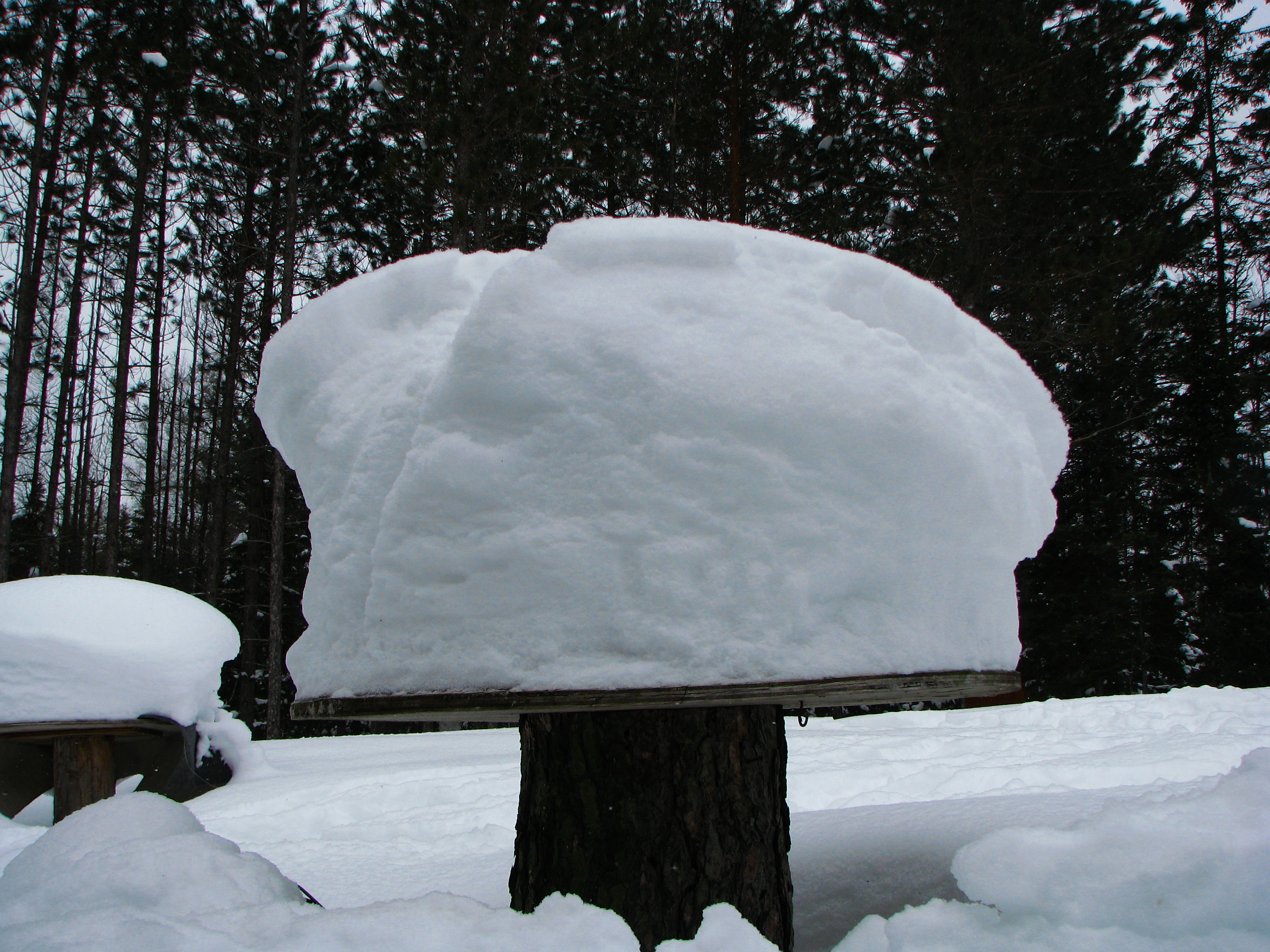
A snow mushroom in Huntsville, Ontario.

Snow mushrooms are large accumulations of compacted snow which form in regions subject to heavy snowfalls. A necessary condition is the presence of a supporting structure, such as boulders or tree stumps resulting from felling operations. In the absence of wind snow gathers on top of the support, growing to as much as 12 feet in diameter. The physical nature of the snow will change under pressure, and layering produced by freeze/thaw cycles, and it will behave like a very viscous fluid. In places fields of snow mushrooms will form, and if the cold conditions and snowfall persist the weight of accumulated snow will cause it to slowly sag or flow down until the ground level is reached, after which it will spread out from the base, losing the typical mushroom shape. This phenomenon was first reported in a 1902 issue of The Geographical Journal. Snow mushrooms may be seen in temperate, frigid and polar regions around the globe, and wherever there is sufficient snowfall, such as high mountains, at intermediate latitudes.
