= Antarctic Cold Reversal =

Episode in Earth climate history

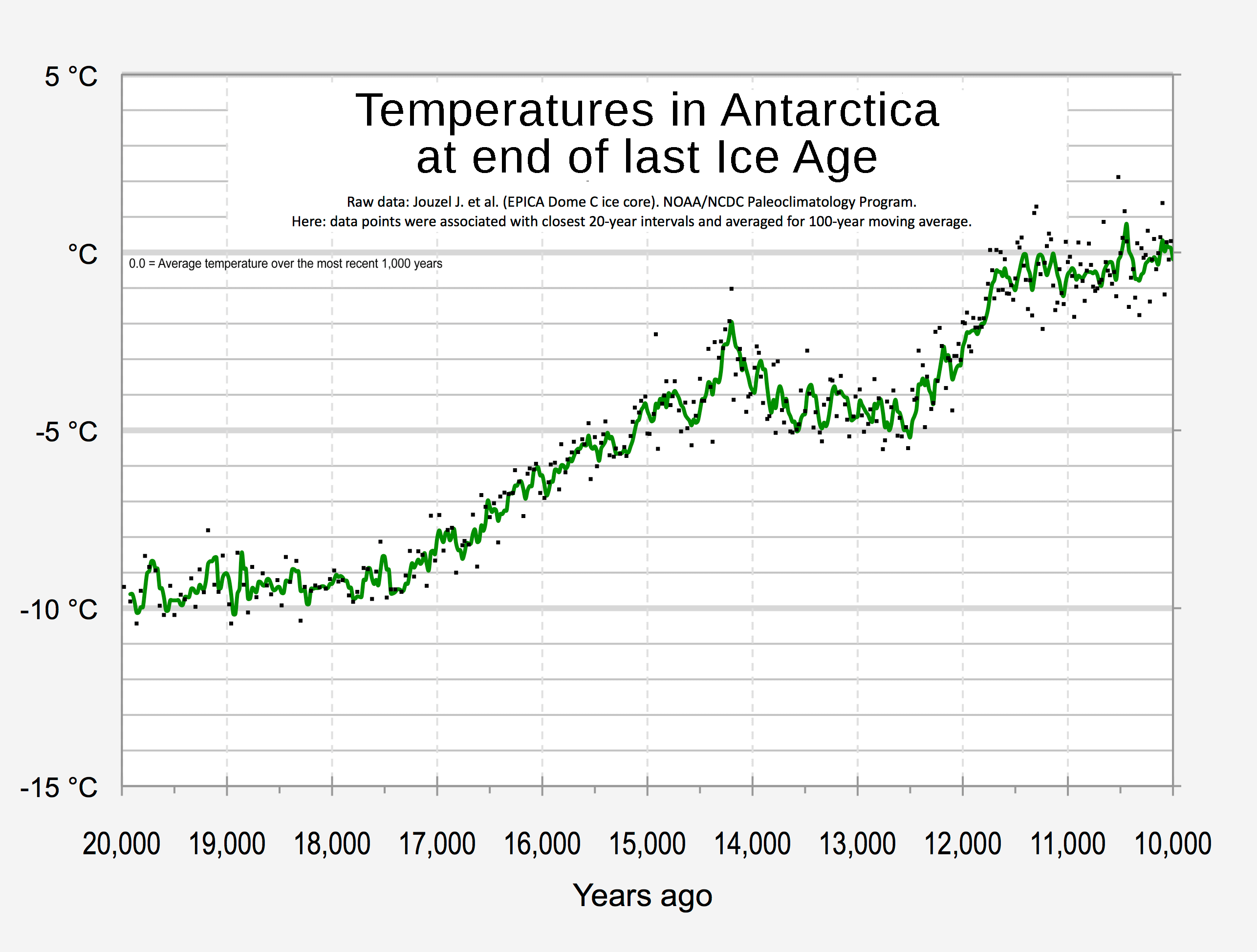
Record of atmospheric temperature taken from EPICA ice core in Antarctica.

The Antarctic Cold Reversal (ACR) was a climatic event of intense atmospheric and oceanic cooling across the southern hemisphere (>40°S) between 14,700 and 13,000 years before present (BP) that interrupted the most recent deglacial climate warming (c. 18,000-11,500 years BP). This cooling event was initially well noted in Antarctic ice core records. Soon after, evidence from sediment cores and glacial advances from land masses (southern South America, New Zealand, Tasmania, among others) and Oceanic sectors south of 40°S expanded the region of this climate cooling event. The ACR illustrates the complexity of the climate changes at the transition from the Pleistocene to the Holocene Epochs.

In general, climate models show a 1.5-2 °C drop in Antarctica and other temperate regions where glacial readvances are typically evident. Climate continued to warm after 13,000 years BP and glaciers showed signs of abrupt withdrawal from their respective ACR aged moraines. The mechanisms behind the atmospheric and oceanic reorganization are still debated, although strengthening of the Atlantic Meridional Overturning Circulation is alluded to in general.

== Stratigraphic and Glacial evidences ==
Global climate during the last Ice Age reached its coolest temperatures between c. 21,000 and 18,000 years BP, marking the onset of the last glacial termination. This transition out of the last Ice Age, also known as deglaciation, lasted until c. 11,500 years BP, when temperature, atmospheric CO_{2} concentrations, and sea level ceased to increase as rapidly, and glaciers reached their less extensive Holocene positions. The period bracketed as the ACR (14,700-13,000 years BP) is characterized by a reversal or halt in these deglacial trends, i.e., temperatures cooled, atmospheric CO_{2} concentrations halted, and glaciers readvanced. Climatic, geologic, and ecologic changes during the ACR are nuanced among geographical regions that showed signs of cooling.

=== Antarctica ===
The ACR is characterized in Antarctica through the ice cores retrieved from locations spread across the whole continent. The principal proxy that tracks atmospheric cooling in Antarctic ice cores are the deuterium signatures which show negative deviations between 14,000 and 12,500 years BP. CO_{2} concentrations have also been shown to consistently drop during this period in these ice cores. In the Southern Ocean, sedimentary ancient DNA and geochemical evidence indicate that a combination of expanded sea-ice cover and blooms of the phytoplankton genus Phaeocystis contributed to enhanced carbon drawdown during the ACR, linking regional marine ecosystem dynamics to the observed atmospheric CO₂ decrease.

=== South America ===
Southern South America has well conserved evidences of climatic cooling during the ACR. Stratigraphic records from southern Patagonia (45°-54°S) show ecological changes associated with climatic cooling or increased precipitation. For example, pollen records show cold tolerant and alpine vegetation that shifted to Rain forest vegetation after 12,500 years BP.

=== New Zealand ===
New Zealand features a swath of records that show a millennial-scale climate cooling during the ACR. Stratigraphic records from the Southern Alps track glacier advances and pronounced forest changes between 14,500 and 12,800 years BP. Chironomid-inferred temperature records suggest a summer temperature decrease of ~3-2 °C.

=== Tasmania ===
Paleoclimatic records from Tasmania have bracketed a local climate cooling event between 14,900 and 12,800 years BP, coincident with the ACR. A paucity in local fire events and an increase in cold-tolerant Rainforest taxa attest to this climatic cooling in Tasmania.
