= South Patagonian Batholith =

The South Patagonian Batholith (Spanish: Batolito Sur-Patagónico) is a group of plutons in southwestern Patagonia. The rocks of batholith include granite, leucogranite, tonalite, granodiorite, diorite, gabbro and mafic dykes. The earliest plutons of the batholith formed in the Late Jurassic with the magmas likely being derived from anatexis. This early magmatism produced a bimodal magmatism that formed both leucogranite and gabbro.
