= Fueguino =

Volcanic field in Cook island, Chile

- Location within Chile

Highest point
- Prominence: 150 m (490 ft)
- Coordinates: 54.95°S 70.25°W

Geography
- Location: Cook, Londonderry Island; Tierra del Fuego, Magallanes; Chile
- Parent range: Tierra del Fuego

Geology
- Rock age: Miocene-Holocene
- Mountain type: Volcanic field
- Volcanic belt: Austral Volcanic Zone
- Last eruption: 1926

Fueguino is a volcanic field in Chile. The southernmost volcano in the Andes, it lies on Tierra del Fuego's Cook Island and also extends over nearby Londonderry Island. The field is formed by lava domes, pyroclastic cones, and a crater lake.

Volcanic activity at Fueguino is part of the Austral Volcanic Zone, which is formed by the subduction of the Antarctic Plate beneath the South America Plate. The subducting plate has not reached a depth sufficient for proper volcanic arc volcanism, however.

The field bears no trace of glacial erosion on its volcanoes, and reports exist of volcanic activity in 1712, 1820 and 1926.

== Geography and geology ==
Fueguino volcano lies in the commune of Cabo de Hornos, Chile. Cities in the region are Rio Gallegos, Puerto Natales, Punta Arenas, Rio Grande and Ushuaia.

=== Regional ===
Fueguino is the southernmost volcano in the Andes. The volcano to the north is Monte Burney, which lies 400 kilometres (250 mi) northwest of Fueguino. Both volcanoes belong to the Austral Volcanic Zone. Since the Paleocene, a transform fault, which bisects the island, has been moving the southern part of Tierra del Fuego eastward along the South America Plate, accompanied by tectonic uplift that persisted into the Holocene except when it was offset by glacial loading effects.

The subduction of the Nazca Plate and Antarctic Plate beneath the South America Plate is responsible for the formation of the Andean Volcanic Belt. This volcanic belt is subdivided into the Northern Volcanic Zone, the Central Volcanic Zone, the Southern Volcanic Zone and the Austral Volcanic Zone. The Austral Volcanic Zone features six Quaternary volcanoes and is 800 kilometres (500 mi) long. It is separated from the Southern Volcanic Zone by the Patagonian volcanic gap, where arc volcanism ceased 12 million years ago.

South of where the Chile Rise intersects the Peru-Chile Trench, the trench disappears as it is increasingly buried by sediments. However, subduction is still active as evidenced by the converging motion of the Antarctic Plate and the South America Plate and the volcanic activity. Only around 52° does the convergence change into strike-slip faulting at the Shackleton Fracture Zone. Subduction in that area commenced 17 million years ago, and the Antarctic slab has not sunk deep into the mantle. At shallow depth, magma generation is dominated by anatexis of the slab. The mantle ahead of the edge of the subducting slab may be dominated by a large slab window.

Other volcanic activity occurred in the region farther east, on Hardy Peninsula and some surrounding capes and islands during the Miocene; potassium-argon dating has yielded ages of 18 and 21 million years ago. These volcanic systems may indicate that the Antarctic Plate is subducting beneath the Scotia Plate.

Three stages of tectonic activity have been noted; Late Cretaceous, Paleocene-Early Eocene and Middle Eocene to Oligocene.

=== Local ===
Fueguino lies on a peninsula on the southeastern side of Cook Island, Tierra del Fuego, but it also extends to Londonderry Island. The main Tierra del Fuego island lies northeast of Fueguino. This area of southern Tierra del Fuego is part of the Fuegian Andes, which are formed by various intrusive, effusive and metamorphic forms on the Scotia Plate.

The field contains lava domes and pyroclastic cones, reaching heights of 150 metres (490 ft). Dikes outcropping about 5 kilometres (3.1 mi) north from the volcanic field may also be genetically related to it. One of these cones has a crater lake within a 150 metres (490 ft) wide crater. Volcanic activity may be influenced by north-south trending faults. Unlike many other volcanoes in the Austral Volcanic Zone, Fueguino is not considered to be a source of widespread tephra deposits.

=== Composition ===
The field has erupted andesite. Such a limited range of composition is typical for Austral Volcanic Zone volcanoes, which only feature andesite and dacite. Lava domes feature columnar joints. The texture of the rocks is trachytic to porphyritic.

The rocks contain phenocrysts of clinopyroxene, hornblende and plagioclase. In terms of composition, the Fueguino rocks belong to the calc-alkaline series and resemble tholeiites and andesites from primitive volcanic arcs. Xenoliths from the Patagonian batholith are also found.

=== Basement ===
The field is formed on top of plutonic rocks, which were scoured by glaciation. At the south coast of Tierra del Fuego, volcanic activity provided the late Jurassic formation known as the Lemaire Formation. Later, during the Cretaceous, the Yaghan Formation consisting of marine sediments was deposed on top of the Lemaire Formation. The basement of Fueguino consists of an ophiolite of Late Jurassic to Early Cretaceous age. The ophiolitic sequence contains pyrrhotite, chalcopyrite, titanomagnetite, cubanite and pyrite.

=== Eruptive history ===
The volcanoes were unaffected by glacial activity, and potassium-argon dating has indicated a near absence of radiogenic argon. Myths of the Yaghan people of a "world fire" may be a reference to volcanism at Fueguino, but they could also refer to an impact event.

Ships passing in the area reported volcanic activity in 1712 and 1820. The former eruption, dated around 26 November is uncertain. It was reported by French captain Josselin Guardin; the volcano was marked on maps as Volcan San Clemente, after Gardin's ship.

The latter eruption was observed on the 25-26 November by HMS Conway captained by Basil Hall, and involved the eruption of incandescent material. According to reports it lasted intermittently for the whole morning that day. A volcanic explosivity index of 2 has been estimated. These volcanic activities were at first assumed to have occurred in the local Andes mountains, but a geological expedition by Giacomo Bove in 1882 found no evidence of a volcano there; the field itself was accidentally discovered by geologists of SERNAGEOMIN in 1978.

Further activity may have occurred on 3 February 1926, when a ship travelling through the northeastern arm of the Beagle Channel encountered a cloud of ash. Such a cloud may have been transported to the ship's location by southwesterly winds from Fueguino. Most recently, seismic swarms far south of Puerto Williams in 2018 were associated with Fueguino in the media.

== Climate and vegetation ==
The vegetation of the area belongs to the Magellanic Province, formed by deciduous trees at low altitudes. Peatlands and bogs are widespread. The climate is temperate and cold, with temperatures of about 5 °C (41 °F) and precipitation decreasing northeastward. Sea surface temperatures in the Beagle Channel range 3–10 °C (37–50 °F). The Fuegian Andes are covered by an ice sheet with outlet glaciers, although only on the Chilean side.

During the ice ages, a substantial ice cap covered the Patagonian and Fuegian Andes. Two stages of glaciation have been identified in southern Tierra del Fuego; four more have been found north of the Magellan Strait. After about 10,000 years ago, Nothofagus woods developed in the region.
