= Adakite =

Volcanic rock type

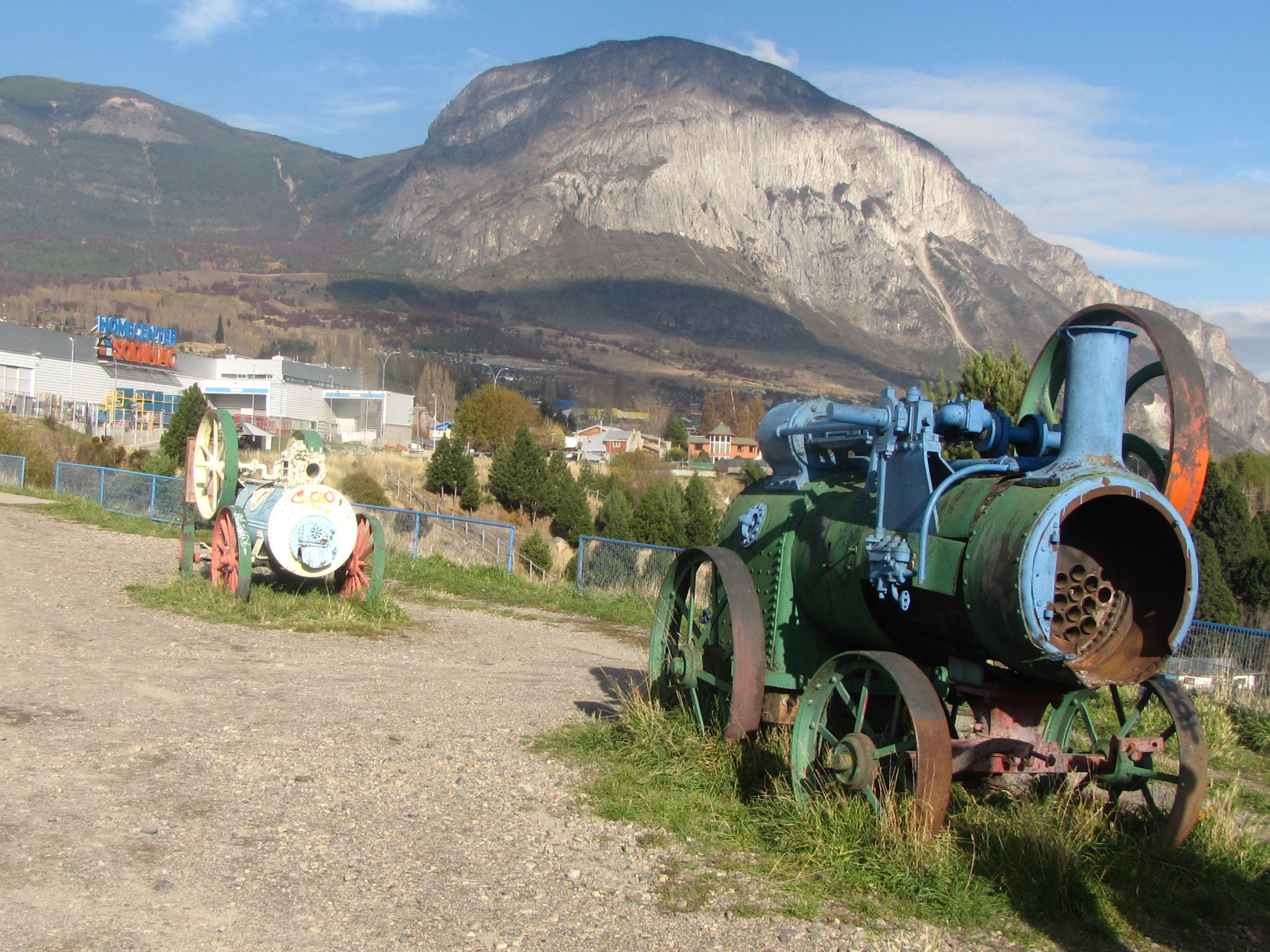
Cerro Mackay, a mountain in Coyhaique in Chile, made of columns of adakite

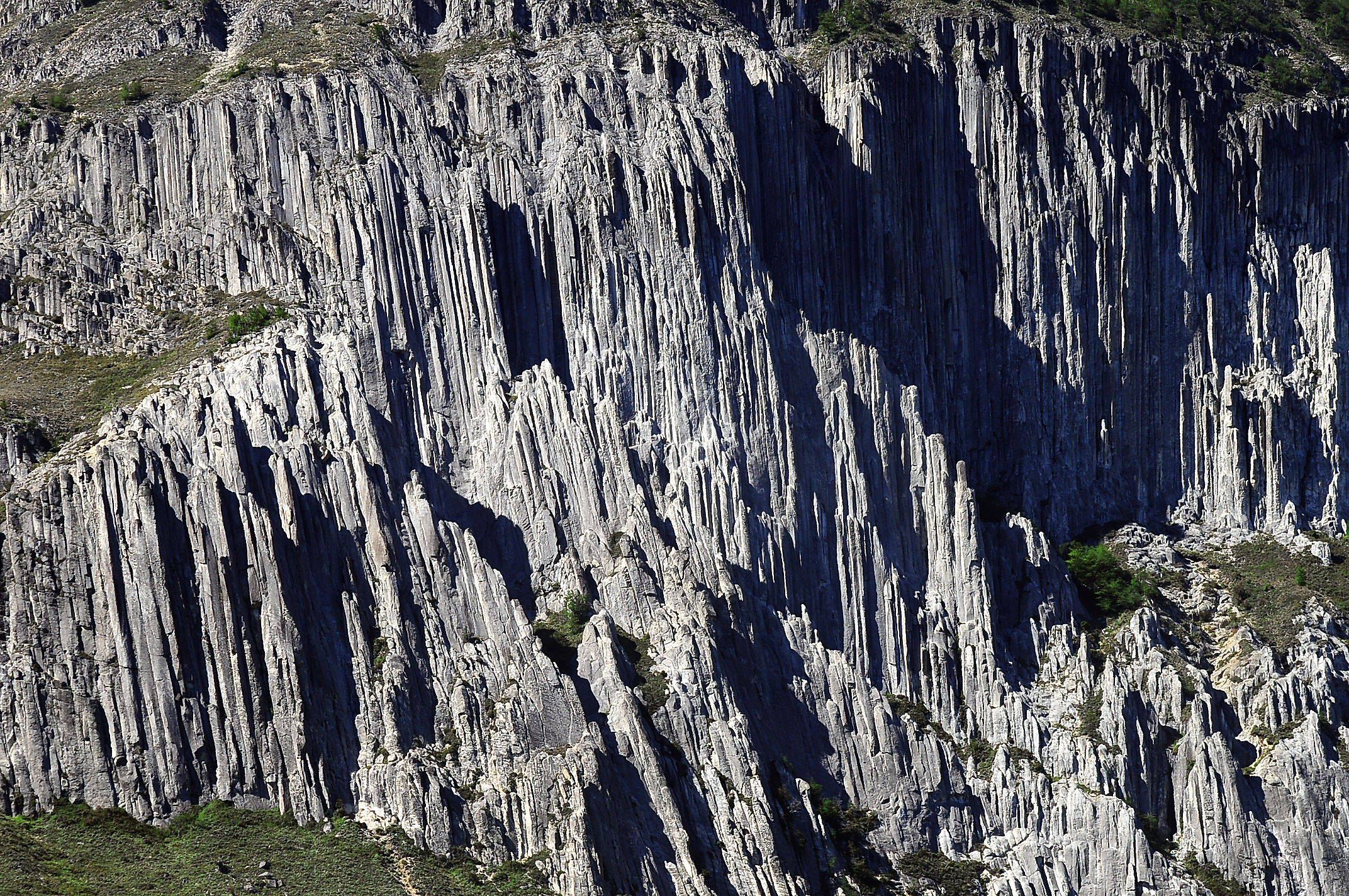
Closer view of the adakite columns of Cerro Mackay, Chile

Adakites are volcanic rocks of intermediate to felsic composition, usually dacitic (felsic) or andesitic (intermediate) that have geochemical characteristics of magma originally thought to have formed by partial melting of altered basalt that is subducted below volcanic arcs. Most magmas derived in subduction zones come from the mantle above the subducting plate when hydrous fluids are released from minerals that break down in the metamorphosed basalt, rise into the mantle, and initiate partial melting. However, Defant and Drummond recognized that when young oceanic crust (less than 25 million years old) is subducted, adakites are typically produced in the arc. They postulated that when young oceanic crust is subducted it is "warmer" (closer to the mid-ocean ridge where it formed) than crust that is typically subducted. The warmer crust enables melting of the metamorphosed subducted basalt rather than the mantle above. Experimental work by several researchers has verified the geochemical characteristics of "slab melts" and the contention that melts can form from young and therefore warmer crust in subduction zones.

The geochemical characteristics Defant and Drummond gave for adakites are:

- SiO_{2} greater than 56 wt %
- Al_{2}O_{3} greater than or equal to 15 wt %
- MgO normally less than 3 wt %
- Sr greater than 400 ppm
- Y less than 18 ppm
- Yb less than 1.9 ppm
- ^{87}Sr/^{86}Sr usually less than 0.7045

Later Defant and Kepezhinskas reviewed the topic in some detail pointing out that adakites are found associated with many mineral deposits including gold and copper.

Drummond and Defant noted that Archean trondhjemites (which make up most of the ancient crust of continents) have similar geochemical characteristics to adakites. They suggested that the entire Archean crust may have been derived from the partial melting of subducted oceanic crust during the Archean (> 2.5 billion years ago) because during early Earth the temperature of the mantle was much hotter and more oceanic crust was generated and subducted younger. The proposal has been controversial and is still being argued among the scientific community. The alternative interpretation is that the continental crust was derived from the partial melting of lower crustal basalts. The same idea has also been postulated for the generation of adakites. However, this hypothesis does not explain the correlation between subducted young crust and adakite eruptions nor the fact that the lower Yb and Y in adakites suggest that garnet is stable in the source. Garnet forms only under high pressures within the Earth and would not be stable in lower crust below some island arcs that erupt adakites. See Martin et al. for a more recent summary.

Low magnesium adakites may be representative of relatively pure partial melting of a subducting basalt, whereas high-magnesium adakite or high-magnesium andesites may represent melt contamination with the peridotites of the overlying mantle wedge. Adakites have also been reported from the continent-continent collision zone beneath Tibet and Lesser Caucasus.

== Examples ==
- Adak Island, Alaska
- Trans-Mexican Volcanic Belt, Mexico
- Mindanao, the Philippines
