= Cardiel Lake =

Lake in Patagonia, Argentina

Lago Cardiel
- Location within Argentina
- Location: Río Chico Department, Santa Cruz Province, Patagonia
- Coordinates: 48°57′S 71°13′W
- Primary inflows: Rio Cardiel
- Primary outflows: none
- Basin countries: Argentina
- Surface area: 370 km^{2} (140 sq mi)
- Average depth: 49.1 m (161 ft)
- Max. depth: 76 m (249 ft)
- Surface elevation: 276 m (906 ft)

Lago Cardiel (Spanish pronunciation: [kaɾˈðjel]) is a lake in Patagonia, Argentina, between the Andean Cordillera and the South Atlantic.
