= Lidia González =

Chilean politician

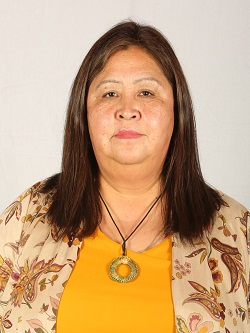

Member of the Constitutional Convention of Chile
- In office July 4, 2021 – July 4, 2022
- Preceded by: office established
- Succeeded by: office abolished
- Constituency: Yagán at-large

Councillor of Cabo de Hornos
- In office December 6, 2008 – December 6, 2016

Personal details
- Born: Lidia Cristina González Calderón; 27 April 1967 (age 58) Puerto Montt, Chile
- Parent: Cristina Calderón (mother)
- Occupation: Politician

Lidia Cristina González Calderón (born 1967) is a Yaghan (or Yámana) politician in Chile. González is a former city council member in Cabo de Hornos and previously served at the helm of the National Corporation for Indigenous Development (CONADI) in Antártica Chilena Province. In 2021, González was elected to represent the Yaghan nation in the Chilean Constitutional Convention, which grants the indigenous nation a reserved seat.

González is the daughter of Cristina Calderón, who was the last living full-blooded Yaghan person from 2005 until her death in 2022.

== Early life and background ==
González was born in 1967 in Puerto Montt, Los Lagos Region to Cristina Calderón and Teodosio González, the youngest of ten daughters. She moved with her parents to Cabo de Hornos as a child, and attended a boarding school to receive her education. Calderón has stated she suffered discrimination for her indigenous background from an early age, and as an adult would be inspired to learn traditional Yaghan basketry. In 1996, González formed the "Ukika Family Ethnic Garden" in Puerto Williams, Magallanes Region.

== Political career ==
In 2008, González mounted a candidacy to serve as a city councilmember in Cabo de Hornos. González ran as an independent with the support of the centre-left Concertación alliance, and was elected with 7.62% of votes cast. Following her election, González became the first member of the Yaghan nation to hold elected office in Chile. In 2012, González stood for reelection and was returned to office after receiving 4.95% of votes cast.

Beginning in 2012, González would work in the Office for the Promotion and Information of Indigenous Rights, and would later run the National Corporation for Indigenous Development (CONADI) in her home region.

In 2019, González participated in a series of protests on Navarino Island against the proposed arrival of salmon fishing companies seeking to fish in surrounding waters. Following months of protest, the campaign to prevent further commercial fishing in the area was successful.

== Constitutional Convention ==
In 2021, González was elected to the Constitutional Convention as the representative of the Yaghan nation, for which the body has reserved a seat. González was the sole candidate in the race, and was elected with 91.04% of the votes cast.
