= Fusional language =

Language where one kind of inflection indicates multiple changes of aspect

Fusional languages or inflected languages are a type of synthetic language, distinguished from agglutinative languages by their tendency to use single inflectional morphemes to denote multiple grammatical, syntactic, or semantic features.

For example, the Spanish verb comer ("to eat") has the active first-person singular indicative preterite tense form comí ("I ate") where just one suffix, -í, denotes the intersection of the active voice, the first person, the singular number, the indicative mood, and preterite (which is the combination of the past tense and perfective aspect), instead of having a separate affix for each feature.

Another illustration of fusionality is the Latin adjective bonus ("good"). The ending -us denotes masculine gender, nominative case, and singular number. Changing any one of these features requires replacing the suffix -us with a different one. In the form bonum, the ending -um denotes masculine accusative singular, neuter accusative singular, or neuter nominative singular.

== Indo-European languages ==
Many Indo-European languages feature fusional morphology, including:

- Balto-Slavic languages, e.g. Polish, Russian, Ukrainian, and the South Slavic languages
- Indo-Iranian languages, e.g. Sanskrit, Bengali, Hindi, Pashto, Kashmiri, Urdu, Punjabi
- Latin and the Romance languages, e.g. Italian, French (partially analytic), Spanish, Portuguese, and Romanian
- Celtic languages, e.g. Irish and Welsh
- Some Germanic languages, e.g. German, Old English, Faroese, and Icelandic
- Greek (Classical and Modern) and Albanian

== Semitic languages ==
Another notable group of fusional languages is the Semitic languages, including Hebrew, Arabic, and Amharic. These also often involve nonconcatenative morphology, in which a word root is often placed into templates denoting its function in a sentence. Arabic is especially notable for this, with the common example being the root k-t-b being placed into multiple different patterns.

== Northeast Caucasian languages ==
Northeast Caucasian languages are weakly fusional, but can be characterized by strong suffixal agglutination overall.

== Uralic languages ==
A limited degree of fusion is also found in many Uralic languages, like Hungarian, Estonian, Finnish, and the Sami languages, such as Skolt Sami, as they are primarily agglutinative.

== Outside Eurasia ==
=== Americas ===
Unusual for a Native North American language, Navajo is sometimes described as fusional because of its complex and inseparable verb morphology.

Some Amazonian languages such as Ayoreo have fusional morphology.

The Fuegian language Selkʼnam has fusional elements. For example, both evidentiality and gender agreement are coded with a single suffix on the verb:

Ya k-tįmi x-įnn nį-y ya.
1P REL-land go-CERT.MASC PRES-MASC 1P
'I go to my land.'

=== Africa ===
Some Nilo-Saharan languages such as Lugbara are also considered fusional.

== Loss of fusionality ==
Fusional languages generally tend to lose their inflection over the centuries, some much more quickly than others. Proto-Indo-European was fusional, but some of its descendants have shifted to a more analytic structure such as Modern English, Danish and Afrikaans or to agglutinative such as Persian and Armenian.

Other descendants remain fusional, including Sanskrit, Ancient Greek, Lithuanian, Latvian, Slavic languages, as well as Latin and the Romance languages and certain Germanic languages.

== Gain of fusionality ==
Some languages shift over time from agglutinative to fusional.

For example, most Uralic languages are predominantly agglutinative, but Estonian is markedly evolving in the direction of a fusional language. On the other hand, Finnish, its close relative, exhibits fewer fusional traits and thereby has stayed closer to the mainstream Uralic type. However, Sámi languages, while also part of the Uralic family, have gained more fusionality than Finnish and Estonian since they involve consonant gradation but also vowel apophony.

== Fusional inflections ==
Inflections in fusional languages tend to fall in two patterns, based on which part of speech they modify: declensions for nouns and adjectives, and conjugations for verbs.

=== Declension ===
One feature of many fusional languages is their system of declensions in which nouns and adjectives have an affix attached to them that specifies grammatical case (their uses in the clause), number and grammatical gender. Pronouns may also alter their forms entirely to encode that information.

Within a fusional language, there are usually more than one declension; Latin and Greek have five, and the Slavic languages have anywhere between three and seven. German has multiple declensions based on the vowel or consonant ending the word, though they tend to be more unpredictable.

However, many descendants of fusional languages tend to lose their case marking. In most Romance and Germanic languages, including Modern English (with the notable exceptions of German, Icelandic and Faroese), encoding for case is merely vestigial because it no longer encompasses nouns and adjectives but only pronouns.

Compare the Italian egli (masculine singular nominative), gli (masculine singular dative, or indirect object), lo (masculine singular accusative) and lui (also masculine singular accusative but emphatic and indirect case to be used with prepositions), corresponding to the single vestigial trio he, him, his in English.

=== Conjugation ===
Conjugation is the alteration of the form of a verb to encode information about some or all of grammatical mood, voice, tense, aspect, person, grammatical gender and number. In a fusional language, two or more of those pieces of information may be conveyed in a single morpheme, typically a suffix.

For example, in French, the verbal suffix depends on the mood, tense and aspect of the verb, as well as on the person and number (but not the gender) of its subject. That gives rise to typically 45 different single-word forms of the verb, each of which conveys some or all of the following:

- mood (indicative, subjunctive, conditional or imperative)
- tense (past, present or future)
- aspect (perfective or imperfective)
- person (first, second or third), and
- number (singular or plural).

Changing any one of those pieces of information without changing the others requires the use of a different suffix, the key characteristic of fusionality.

English has two examples of conjugational fusion. The verbal suffix -s indicates a combination of present tense with both third-person and singularity of the associated subject, and the verbal suffix -ed used in a verb with no auxiliary verb conveys both non-progressive aspect and past tense.

== See also ==
- Inflection
- Synthetic language
