= Villa Ukika =

- Location within Chile
- Coordinates: 54°56′01″S 67°35′28″W
- Country: Chile
- Region: Magallanes
- Province: Antártica Chilena
- Commune: Cabo de Hornos
- Time zone: UTC−4 (CLT)
  - Summer (DST): UTC−3 (CLST)

Villa Ukika is a rural area located in the commune of Cabo de Hornos, in the Antártica Chilena Province of the Magallanes Region of Chile. Located 2 km (1.2 mi) east of Puerto Williams, on Navarino Island, it is known for being the place where the descendants of the last representatives of the Yaghan people live.

== History ==
Villa Ukika was established in 1967 after the naval authorities of Puerto Williams decided to transfer the Yaghans who inhabited the Bahía Mejillones sector. The following decade, the population of the village reached 58 inhabitants. In the same period, the acculturation of the Yaghans took place, as a result of easier access to health services, education and communications.

Towards the end of the 1990s in Villa Ukika, there were 14 houses, most of them built in wood and brass and occupied by their owners. Among the best known inhabitants of the town were sisters Úrsula and Cristina Calderón, the last native speakers of the Yaghan language.

The Yaghans residing in Villa Ukika own a large part of the buildings on the site, as well as surrounding land.

== Services ==
In Villa Ukika there is the "Centro de Artesanía Yagán Kipa-Ákar" — "Casa de la Mujer" in the Yaghan language, built between 2003 and 2004 and in which Yaghan handicrafts are exhibited and sold, consisting of basketry made reeds and scale replicas of the canoes used to navigate the southern channels. Gastronomy is also presented, consisting mainly of marine products.
