= Indigenous peoples in Chile =

Native Chileans
Chilenos nativos (Spanish)
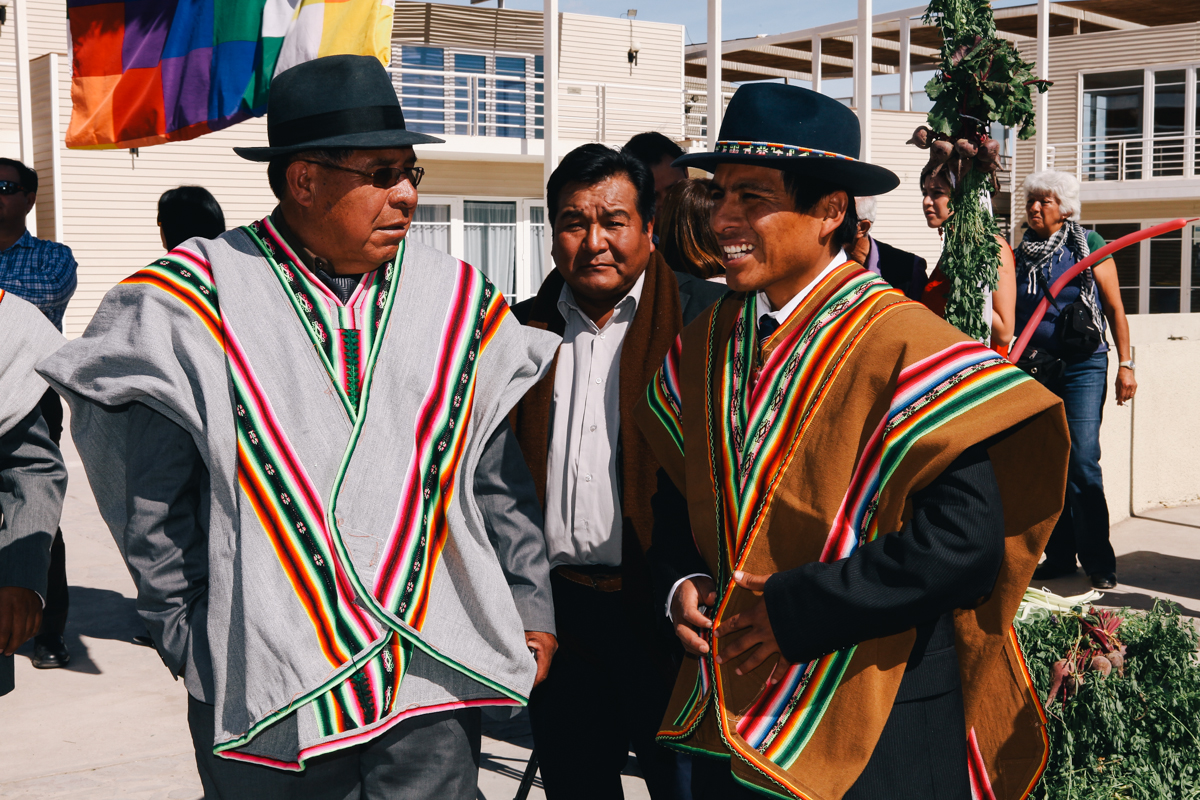
- Aymara community in Pozo Almonte, Tarapacá

Total population
- Amerindian ancestry predominates ▼2,105,863 (2024 census) ▼11.50% of the Chilean population • Native Americans: 2,099,204 (11.46%) • Austronesians: 6,659 (0.04%)

Regions with significant populations
- Predominantly in the Zona Sur, the Norte Grande and the Zona Austral
- (Santiago Metropolitan Region) Santiago Metropolitan: 545,700
- (Araucanía Region) La Araucanía: 347,285
- (Los Lagos Region) Los Lagos: 236,886
- (Biobío Region) Biobío: 150,917
- (Valparaíso Region) Valparaíso: 103,716

Languages
- Spanish • Indigenous languages (including Mapuche, Aymara, Huilliche, Rapa Nui)

Religion
- Majority: Catholicism; Minority: Indigenous religion

Related ethnic groups
- Indigenous peoples of the Americas; Polynesians (Rapa Nui)

Indigenous peoples in Chile (Spanish: Chilenos indígenas) or Native Chileans (Spanish: Chilenos nativos), are Chileans who have predominant or total Amerindian or Rapa Nui ancestry. According to the 2024 census, 2,105,863 people declare having Indigenous origins, representing 11.5% of the total population. Most Chileans are of partially Indigenous descent; however, Indigenous identification and its legal ramifications are typically reserved to those who self-identify with and are accepted within one or more Indigenous groups.

Human presence in Chilean territory can be documented from at least 14,500 BCE, based on archaeological remains found at Monte Verde in the southern part of the country. From that time onward, diverse societies inhabited the territory during the pre-Columbian period, and it is estimated that more than one million people lived in the area prior to the Spanish conquest of Chile.

European colonization had a devastating impact on the Indigenous population, which experienced a drastic decline due to introduced diseases, wars, forced labor, and harsh living conditions. In addition, many survivors were compelled to abandon their cultures and assimilate into the dominant society. Some peoples disappeared entirely.

From the 19th century onward, the Chilean state implemented policies that deepened Indigenous dispossession, such as the Occupation of Araucanía and the creation of Indigenous reservations (reducciones), which severely restricted access to ancestral lands. The Informe de Verdad Histórica y Nuevo Trato (2003) acknowledged this historical debt and recommended reparative measures, including the recognition of collective rights over land and natural resources, as well as Indigenous political participation.

Despite this historical background, Indigenous peoples maintain a significant presence in Chile. Since 1993, the state has officially recognized 11 Indigenous peoples. The Mapuche, with their traditional lands in south-central Chile, account for approximately 80% of the total Indigenous population. There are also small populations of Aymara, Quechua, Atacameño, Qulla (Kolla), Diaguita, Yahgan (Yámana), Rapa Nui and Kawésqar (Alacalufe) people in other parts of the country, as well as many other groups such as Caucahue, Chango, Picunche, Chono, Tehuelche, Cunco and Selkʼnam.

Indigenous peoples in Chile face various forms of racial and social discrimination, as well as higher rates of poverty, unemployment, and illiteracy compared with the rest of the population. Their demands include constitutional recognition, respect for territorial rights, and progress toward forms of autonomy and self-determination.

Geographic distribution of Indigenous Chileans.

== History ==
Native Chileans 1907-2024
Year	Population	% of Chile
1907	101,118	3.13%
1930	98,703	▼2.30%
1940	115,145	▼2.29%
1952	130,747	▼2.20%
1992	998,385	▲10.33%
2002	692,192	▼4.58%
2012	1,842,607	▲11.08%
2017	2,185,792	▲12.44%
2024	2,105,863	▼11.50%
Source: Chilean census

Before the Spanish arrived in the mid 16th century, Chile was home to the southernmost portion of the Inca Empire. The Inca first expanded into Chile under Túpac Inca Yupanqui who ruled from 1471 to 1493. At its peak, the empire's southern border was the Maule River in central Chile. Shortly thereafter, Spanish conquistadors led by Francisco Pizarro started to make contact with Inca in Peru in the 1530s. The combination of European diseases and internal conflicts over succession severely weakened the strength and size of the empire, which ultimately collapsed during Spanish conquest of the Inca Empire in 1532.

While the Inca Empire fell, the Mapuche people were never formally defeated by Spanish conquistadors. Instead, this Indigenous population maintained a tense independence from Spain throughout the colonial period. There were several small skirmishes throughout the 1500s and in 1553 a Mapuche attack killed the regional Spanish governor. The conflict between the Mapuche and the Spanish culminated in the Arauco War which ultimately ended with official recognition for the Mapuche people and their territory. The Mapuche were one of the few Indigenous groups in Latin America who were formally recognized as possessing territory by the Spanish. Because of this recognition, the Mapuche did not align with Chilean nationalists during the Chilean War of Independence. Instead they chose to side with the Spanish, because the imperial power's legal recognition of the Mapuche tribe made them more of a known quantity than the Chilean rebels.

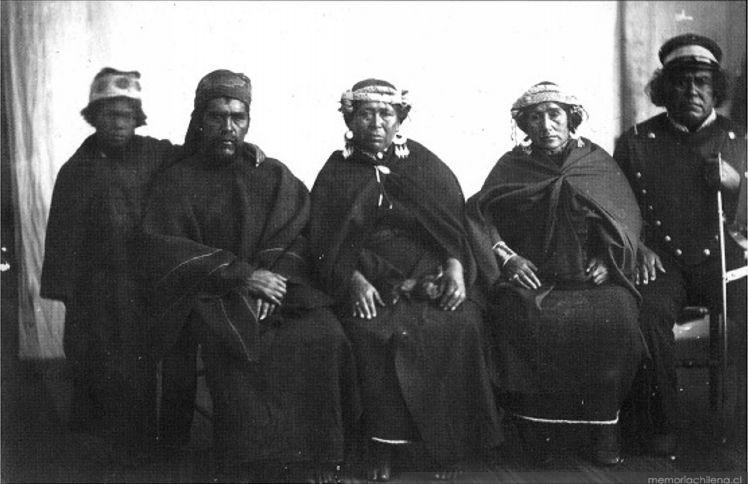
The Mapuche Cacique Juan Huaraman in the La Moneda Palace in 1863.

After the war, the newly-formed Chilean government forced the Mapuche onto reservations approximately 1/20th the size of the area they had previously occupied. Much of their former land was further divided up and sold, including to extractive industries such as forestry and hydropower.

The ancient flag of the Mapuche people.

Although Indigenous Chileans were not allies of Chilean independence fighters, by the mid-19th century, Chilean school curriculum included depictions of Indigenous warriors that claimed they were central to the development of the Chilean identity. Even so, those Indigenous groups were still excluded from any participation in political life, making Indigenous representation purely symbolic.

=== The Indigenous Law ===
Since the fall of the Pinochet regime in 1990 and subsequent return to democracy, the Chilean government has revisited Indigenous peoples' role in Chilean society. President Patricio Aylwin Azócar's Concertación government established a Comisión Especial de Pueblos indígenas (Special Commission of Indigenous People). This commission's report provided the intellectual framework of the 1993 "Indigenous Law" (ley indígena) or Law Nº 19.253.

The Indigenous Law established the National Corporation for Indigenous Development (CONADI), which included directly elected Indigenous representatives, advised and directed government programs to assist the economic development of Indigenous people. Part of that cultural recognition included legalizing the Mapudungun language and providing a bilingual education in schools with Indigenous populations. The Indigenous Law recognized in particular the Mapuche people, victims of the Occupation of the Araucanía from 1861 to 1883, as an inherent part of the Chilean nation. Other Indigenous people officially recognized included Aymara, Atacameña, Colla, Quechua, Rapa-Nui (Polynesian inhabitants of Easter Island), Yahgan (Yámana), Kawésqar, Diaguita (since 2006), Chango (Camanchaco) (since 2020) and Selkʼnam (Ona) (since 2023).

Chile is one of the twenty countries to have signed and ratified the only binding international law concerning Indigenous peoples, Indigenous and Tribal Peoples Convention, 1989. It was adopted in 1989 as the International Labour Organization Convention 169. Chile ratified the convention in 2008. In November 2009, a court decision in Chile, considered to be a landmark in Indigenous rights concerns, made use of the ILO convention 169. The Supreme Court decision on Aymara water rights upholds rulings by both the Pozo Almonte tribunal and the Iquique Court of Appeals, and marks the first judicial application of ILO Convention 169 in Chile.

=== Constitutional recognition ===
Despite the benefits established by Indigenous Law, it still has its limitations, spurring the emergence of organized Mapuche movements for more direct constitutional recognition. In the 1990s, the Aukin Ngulam Wallmapu or "Council of All Lands" movement began the fight towards constitutional recognition and self-determination. Recognition of plurinational status in Chile would enshrine the Indigenous population as its own group deserving of political representation, autonomy, and territorial protection.

As a result of Indigenous mobilization and protest, Mapuche organizers encouraged constitutional reform on the national stage. In 2007, Chilean President Bachelet indicated the Indigenous constitutional reform as a "high urgency act". Despite Bachelet's endorsement, the reform was relabeled as a "low urgency act", delaying the procedure of Indigenous constitutional inclusion.

The rejected constitutional proposals would have safeguarded environmental protections, established gender parity, and extended access to education for the Mapuche people, among a host of other social and democratic provisions.

The Indigenous fight for independence and more direct recognition remains relevant today. Recent protests provide Indigenous activists an opportunity to advocate for amending the constitution to include Indigenous rights. In October 2019, there were a series of protests in Santiago, over the increased fare rates for the transportation system. These protests led to debates and discussions over the privatized Chilean social benefits system, and a call to alter the constitution to increase the efficacy of the social welfare system.

These protests culminated in a constitutional draft that would have included constitutional recognition. While in 2020, 78% of Chilean citizens voted in favor of rewriting the constitution, in the 2022 Chilean national plebiscite, 62% of Chilean voters rejected this proposal. Across the border, Indigenous people in Bolivia have constitutional recognition. This recognition respects the identities and rights of many of the same Indigenous groups that live in Chile. Still, Chile remains the only Latin American country that has yet to constitutionally recognize Indigenous populations. The lack of reform is a result of the deep rooted inequality within the Chilean government, stemming from Pinochet-era policies that favor urban elites over environmental and Indigenous issues. Looking forward, the Chilean Congress has granted approval for a new Constitutional process, which will draft another potential Constitution.

== Demographics ==
=== Historical figures ===
Due to the absence of historical records, it is difficult to estimate the population living in what is now Chile prior to Spanish colonization. It is generally suggested that the Indigenous population numbered around one million inhabitants, although estimates range from 450,000 to 1,500,000 people. During the colonial period, the administration of the Captaincy General of Chile maintained various population records, which have helped historians produce estimates of the country's population and its division among the principal social castes of the time. The philologist Ángel Rosenblat produced estimates indicating that the colonial territory (Note: The data include the colonial Chilean territory and therefore, in most cases, also include the Corregimiento of Cuyo. By contrast, the regions of the Norte Grande, which were under the direct administration of the Viceroyalty of Peru, and territories not incorporated into Spanish administration, such as Patagonia, are excluded.) maintained a relatively stable population of around 600,000 inhabitants; however, the Indigenous share of that population declined from 94% around 1570 to 58% by 1800.

Estimated population in colonial Chile (Note: The data include the colonial Chilean territory and therefore, in most cases, also include the Corregimiento of Cuyo. By contrast, the regions of the Norte Grande, which were under the direct administration of the Viceroyalty of Peru, and territories not incorporated into Spanish administration, such as Patagonia, are excluded.)
Year	Indigenous	European or White	Mestizo	Black or Mulatto	Total	% Indigenous population
1570	600,000	10,000	10,000		620,000	96.8%
1600	600,000	10,000	20,000	8,000	638,000	94.0%
1650	520,000	15,000	8,000	7,000	550,000	94.5%
1700	500,000	25,000	45,000	20,000	590,000	84.7%
1800	350,000	50,000	160,000	40,000	600,000	58.3%

Following independence, censuses became regular from the early years of the Chilean state. However, Indigenous populations were not systematically recorded. In the late 19th century, so-called censos de indios (Indian censuses) were conducted to count Indigenous populations, but these were restricted exclusively to the Araucanía region and therefore excluded non-Mapuche Indigenous peoples. In 1875, between 50,000 and 60,000 Indigenous people were counted who were described as maintaining their culture "without immediate subjection to the authorities of the country". This group included "Araucanian tribes (muluches, telvinches, lauquenches and huilliches), as well as the Chonos, Patagonians, and Fuegians."

The 1907 census was the first regular census to include this category, although it was applied only in the provinces between Arauco and Llanquihue. On that occasion, 101,118 Indigenous people were recorded, representing 3.12% of the total population of the country. In the 1930 census, only Mapuche people (referred to as araucanos "Araucanians") living in Indigenous reservations were counted, totaling 98,703 individuals. The 1952 census was the first to apply this criterion nationwide and the first to use self-identification as an Indigenous person; however, it only collected information on the Mapuche people.

The demographic counting of Indigenous peoples was resumed in the 1992 census, which for the first time included peoples other than the Mapuche, specifically the Aymara and Rapa Nui. In the 2002 census, statistical distinctions were made among the eight Indigenous peoples officially recognized at the time. In the subsequent 2012 census, the Diaguita people officially recognized in May 2008 were incorporated, and respondents were also allowed to identify as belonging to otros pueblos (other peoples). According to the 2024 census there are the following Indigenous groups:

Indigenous group	Total population
Mapuche	1,623,073
Aymara	178,637
Diaguita	153,231
Quechua	46,519
Atacameño or Lickanantay	36,221
Colla	21,913
Chango	11,795
Rapa Nui	6,659
Kawésqar	2,153
Selk'nam	1,392
Yagán	1,244
Others	20,631
Undeclared	2,395
Total	2,105,863

Indigenous population by census
Census	Mapuche population	Population of other peoples	Indigenous population	Total population	% Indigenous population	Observation	Ref.
1907	101,118	N/C	101,118	3,231,022	3.13%	Only Mapuche territory and people	
1930	98,703	N/C	98,703	4,287,445	▼2.30%	Only Mapuche territory and people	
1940	115,145	N/C	115,145	5,023,539	▼2.29%	Only Mapuche reduction	
1952	130,747	N/C	130.747	5,932,995	▼2.20%	Only the Mapuche people	
1992	928,060	70,325	998,385	9,660,367	▲10.33%	Nationwide, population aged 14 and over, three peoples	
2002	604,349	87,843	692,192	15,116,435	▼4.58%	Nationwide, eight peoples	
2012	1,508,722	333,885	1,842,607	16,634,603	▲11.08%	Nationwide, ten peoples	
2017	1,745,147	440,645	2,185,792	17,076,076	▲12.44%	Nationwide, ten peoples and "others" (Note: Within the category "Other peoples," groups that are not usually included as part of the indigenous peoples of Chile were considered, such as Afro-descendants or indigenous peoples from other countries around the world. Counting only those people identified as belonging to an indigenous people in Chile—officially recognized peoples, other unrecognized peoples, and undeclared indigenous affiliation—the indigenous population would total 2,164,362 people, equivalent to 12.67% of the censused population that responded to this question.)	
2024	1,623,073	482,790	2,105,863	18,480,432	▼11.50%	Nationwide, eleven peoples and "others" (Note: Within the category "Other peoples," groups that are not usually considered part of the indigenous peoples of Chile were included, such as indigenous peoples from other countries around the world. Unlike the previous census, Afro-descendant Chileans were not included, as they were counted under a separate census question (equivalent to 174,190 people).)	

==== CASEN survey ====
In addition to national censuses, the National Socioeconomic Characterization Survey (Encuesta de Caracterización Socioeconómica Nacional, CASEN) has estimated the number of people who identify as belonging to indigenous peoples. Since the inclusion of this variable in 2006, the proportion of people identifying as indigenous has shown a steady upward trend. In the most recent available survey (2017), 9.5% of the population identified as indigenous.

Indigenous population according to the CASEN survey
CASEN	Mapuche population	Population of other peoples	Estimated Indigenous population	% Indigenous population
2006	924,560	136,226	1,060,786	6.6%
2009	984,316	162,606	1,146,922	6.9%
2011	1,183,102	186,461	1,369,563	8.1%
2013	1,321,717	244,198	1,565,915	9.1%
2015	1,329,450	256,230	1,585,680	9.0%
2017	1,437,308	257,562	1,694,870	9.5%

=== Regional distributions ===
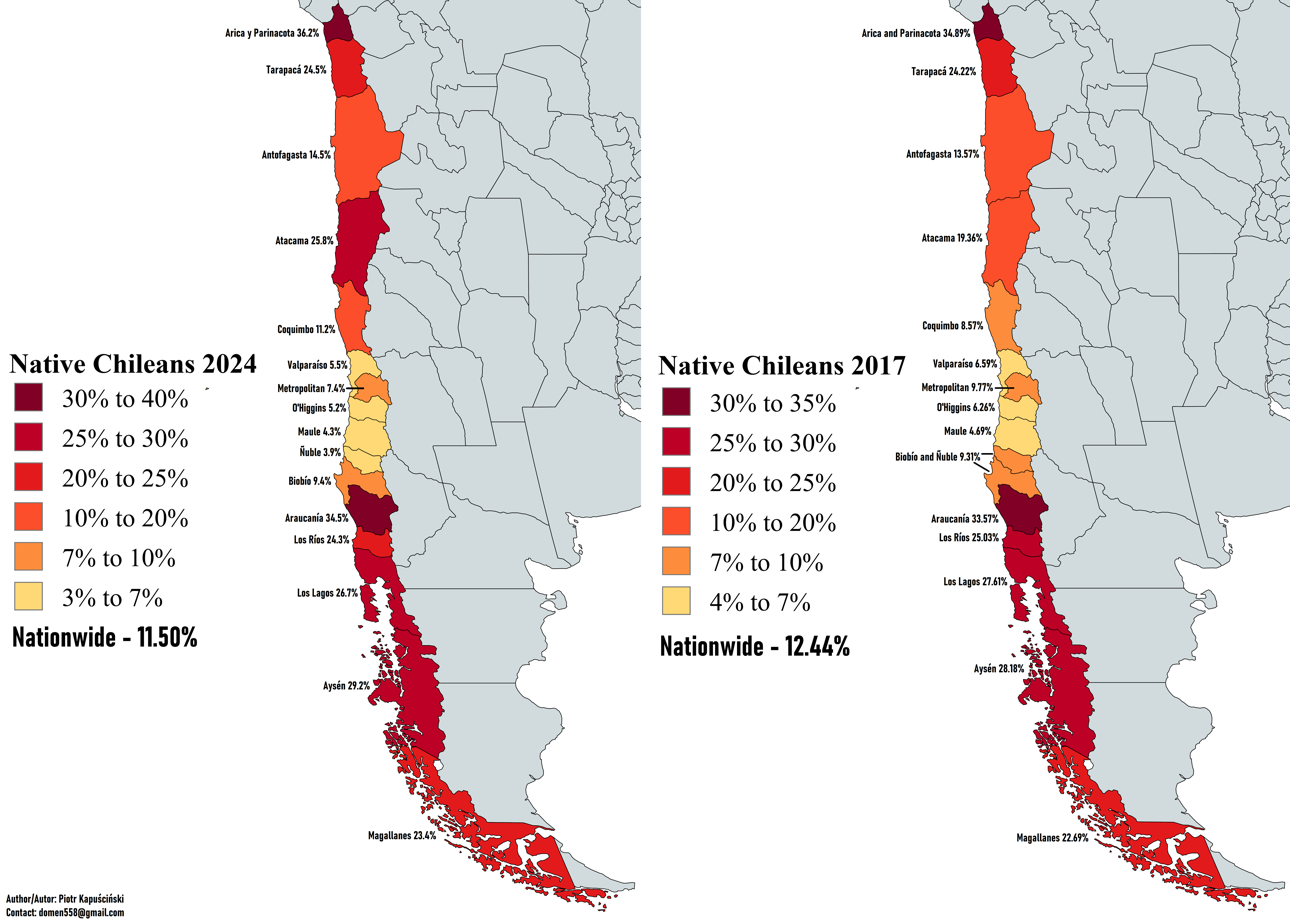
Map of distribution of Native Chileans according to censuses of 2024 and 2017

The highest concentration of Indigenous people in Chile is found in the northern and southern parts of the country. The Araucanía Region has the highest proportion of inhabitants who identify as Indigenous (34.3% of its population), followed by the Arica and Parinacota Region (33.5%). The central zone of the country, despite having the largest Indigenous population in absolute numbers, has the lowest proportional presence; the Ñuble Region has the smallest percentage, with 4.8% of its population identifying as Indigenous according to the latest census. The Metropolitan Region of Santiago, which concentrates the largest population nationwide, is also the region with the largest number of indigenous inhabitants, totaling 685,403 people, equivalent to 9.9% of the regional population.

The Mapuche people are the main Indigenous group in 11 of Chile's 16 regions, from the Valparaíso Region southward. Even in northern regions where they are not the majority, more than 3% of the resident population identifies as Mapuche. At the municipal level, the highest presence is found in Alto Biobío, where 84.7% of its inhabitants identify as Mapuche.

In northern Chile, the main group is the Aymara people, who make up between 15% and 27% of the population in the regions of Arica and Parinacota and Tarapacá. In the Antofagasta Region, 4% of the population identifies as Atacameño, followed by Mapuche (3%), Aymara (2.2%), and Quechua (4.31%), the latter representing the highest regional concentration of this people. The Diaguita people are the main group in the regions of Atacama and Coquimbo, with their highest concentration in the municipality of Alto del Carmen (49.7%). In Atacama, a significant Colla population also stands out, equivalent to 5% of the regional population.

In the remaining regions, the presence of other indigenous peoples is concentrated in small territories. The Rapa Nui make up 47% of the population of Easter Island. In the far south, the Kawésqar people account for 0.58% of the population of the Magallanes Region, while the Yagán people represent 0.19% of the region.

Indigenous population by region, according to the 2024 census
Region	Indigenous population	% Indigenous	Main people	Percentage
Arica y Parinacota	87,816	36.2%	Aymara	28.7%
Tarapacá	89,987	24.5%	Aymara	14.9%
Antofagasta	91,280	14.5%	Atacameño	4.3%
Atacama	76,616	25.8%	Diaguita	14.5%
Coquimbo	92,753	11.2%	Diaguita	6.5%
Valparaíso	103,716	5.5%	Mapuche	4.0%
Santiago Metropolitan Region	545,700	7.4%	Mapuche	6.6%
O'Higgins	50,681	5.2%	Mapuche	4.6%
Maule Region	47,811	4.3%	Mapuche	3.9%
Ñuble Region	20,145	3.9%	Mapuche	3.6%
Biobío Region	150,917	9.4%	Mapuche	9.1%
Araucanía	347,285	34.5%	Mapuche	34.1%
Los Ríos Region	96,382	24.3%	Mapuche	23.9%
Los Lagos Region	236,886	26.7%	Mapuche	26.2%
Aysén	29,230	29.2%	Mapuche	28.2%
Magallanes and Antártica Chilena	38,658	23.4%	Mapuche	22.0%

=== Ethnic composition ===
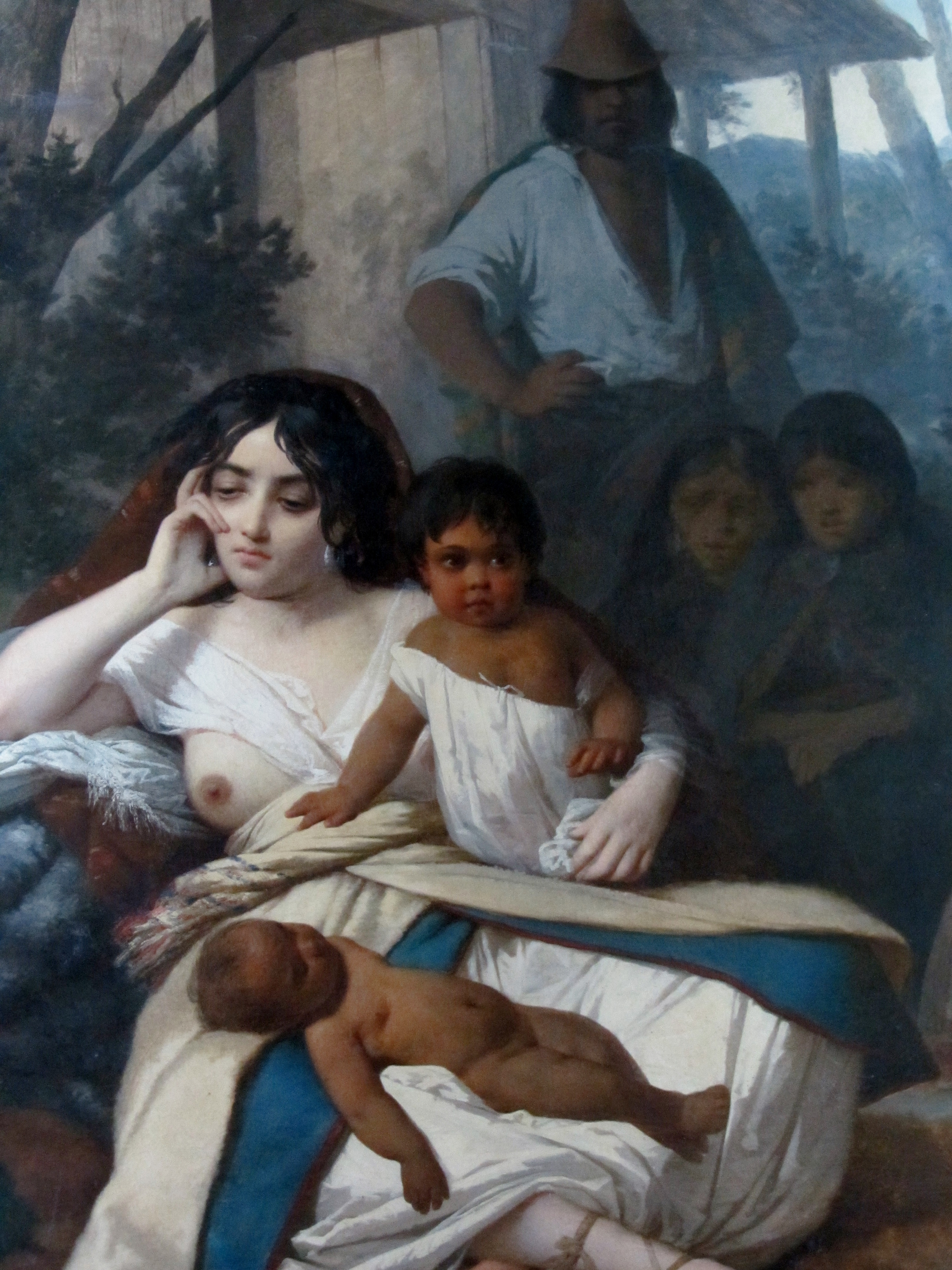
Elisa Bravo, a European woman who became the wife of a local Mapuche cacique. Painting by Raymond Monvoisin

Historically, various researchers have argued that the Chilean population is predominantly mestizo, with ancestry derived mainly from both European populations and Indigenous peoples of the Americas in relatively similar proportions. During the 20th century, this mestizaje became one of the pillars of the idea of Chile as a racially homogeneous nation, which often marginalized and denied the existence of Indigenous communities.

Genetic studies conducted in recent decades have confirmed that the vast majority of Chile's population has mestizo ancestry. On average, the Chilean population has an estimated European genetic component of approximately 51–57%, while the Indigenous component is estimated at around 38–44%, with African ancestry accounting for less than 6%. This distribution, however, is not uniform across Chilean society: lower-income groups tend to have a higher Indigenous genetic component—sometimes exceeding the European component and Indigenous ancestry is also more prevalent in the northern and southern regions of the country.

Regarding populations that identify as Indigenous, genetic studies indicate that there are no genetically "pure" Indigenous populations in Chile, as all groups show some degree of mestizaje. Genetic analyses of individuals whose parents' surnames are entirely identifiable as Indigenous show an average European component of about 20% and an Indigenous component of approximately 80%. Among Indigenous peoples, the Atacameño and Mapuche populations exhibit higher levels of mestizaje, while groups living in more isolated areas such as the southern channels or mountainous regions like those inhabited by the Aymara and Pehuenche show a lower European genetic component, in some cases below 5%.

== Current issues ==
=== Social and economic status ===
In 2005, CONADI regularized the property titles to approximately 70,000 hectares (173,000 acres) of land that were restored to 300 Aymara families in the north. However, some observers criticized a lack of transparency in CONADI's land restoration processes and favoritism of the Mapuche over other Indigenous groups.

The Ministry of Education provided a package of financial aid consisting of 1,200 scholarships for Indigenous elementary and high school students in the Araucania Region during 2005. The government also implemented the Indigenous Scholarship Program that benefited 36,000 low-income Indigenous elementary, high school, and college students with good academic performances.

Still the Indigenous people in Chile face systemic poverty and discrimination. The limited representation of Indigenous peoples in governmental bodies has resulted in instances of encroachment and appropriation of Mapuche territory. Limited access to education has also hindered the Mapuche people from obtaining higher-paying and skilled jobs. Moreover, the Mapuche people are considered to be on the lowest level of socio-economic livelihood in Chilean society. The poverty level for the Mapuche people is 29% compared to the 20% poverty rate of the non-Indigenous Chilean citizens. Their lack of political influence is evident in their interactions with businesses such as Forestry Farms and Lumber companies that exploit Indigenous land. Dispossession of their land and their exclusion from Chilean politics create an avenue for conflict between Indigenous militias and the Chilean state.

=== Mapuche conflict ===
Since 2009, there have been frequent instances of violent confrontations between Indigenous Mapuche groups and landowners, logging companies, and local government authorities in the southern part of the country. These conflicts were a result of encroachment on Indigenous land, a direct result of the continuing lack of constitutional recognition. The confrontations ranged from protests and, occasionally, instances of rock throwing, land occupations, and burning of crops or buildings. Many of these actions were initiated by the Coordinadora Arauco Malleco (CAM), an Indigenous group that has been accused of terrorist acts.

Three CAM-related Mapuches and a non-Indigenous sympathizer remained imprisoned in a 2001 arson case in which antiterrorism penalties were applied. The four initiated a hunger strike in March, demanding the terrorism convictions be voided to allow their release on parole. In April the court acquitted two other individuals of all charges, criminal and terrorist, in the same case. In September the Senate rejected a proposed law to allow the release of the four imprisoned on terrorist charges. Government-sponsored legislation which would clarify the application of the antiterrorism law remained pending at year's end.

The government did not act on a United Nations special rapporteur's 2003 recommendation that there be a judicial review of cases affecting Mapuche leaders. The government had not applied the antiterrorism law in Mapuche-related prosecutions since 2002. However, it began again to apply this law in August, 2009, as the Mapuche conflict deepened following several acts of occupation and arson, as well as the killing of a Mapuche activist.

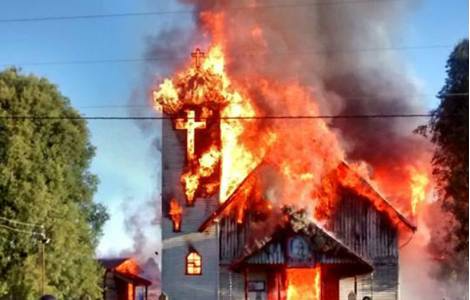
Mapuche terrorist attacks on churches in the Zona Sur in 2016.

The tensions exposed by the Mapuche Conflict of 2009 reemerged in 2017 under the Bachelet government, in which a covert operation, 'Operation Hurricane,' was carried out by police. As a result of the operation, eight CAM Mapchue members were wrongfully arrested for a string of arson attacks. Citing past rhetoric associated with CAM's political demands, media and business sectors painted a violent picture of the Mapuche community members allegedly involved. However, in October 2017, Chile's Supreme Court intervened and released the accused based on falsified evidence. As a result, both the director of the intelligence unit and head of police lost their jobs. The incident exposed repeated patterns of violent associations cast on Mapuche activist groups by the press (See also: Rapa Nui police repression and Aymara mining protests).

Still, these types of conflict have continued sporadically to present day with both CAM and the splinter group Weichan Auka Mapu (WAM) continuing to lead protests. Both groups have expressed a willingness to use violence, attacking and sabotaging forestry operations, infrastructural corporations, and private homes of non-Indigenous civilians who live on former Indigenous lands. These acts are performed with the intent to further the political goals of land redistribution.

=== Environment ===
The frequent conflict and protests are mostly a result of threatened Indigenous territories. Indigenous land is often at risk as the government or private organizations impact nearby ecosystems. For example, recent hydropower projects harm waterflow and local biodiversity on Indigenous land, threatening Indigenous spirituality and plant-based medicinal items. Chile has attempted to develop hydropower projects in Indigenous territory where the rivers that the energy companies hope to use are sacred to the Mapuche people.

One area impacted by hydropower development is the Puelwillimapu Territory, whose interconnected waterways are referred to as the watershed of Wenuleufu or the 'River Above,' giving the region spiritual value. To combat this encroachment, Indigenous people have protested and pushed for more of a voice in projects that can impact their territories. However, smaller scale hydropower projects do not require Indigenous consultation.

Indigenous populations have had some success in working with the government to ensure traditionally Indigenous coastal areas remain under Indigenous administration. Specifically, the Marine and Coastal Areas for Indigenous Peoples Policy (MCAIP) was established in 2008 to protect fisheries and increase Indigenous inclusion in decision making. The government protects these areas as a means of supporting ecological development while also ensuring that Indigenous groups are able to maintain control of culturally significant locations.

=== Indigenous women ===
Women are at the forefront of Mapuche protests against institutions like forestry companies and the formation of the Ralco Dam. In particular, Berta and Nicolasa Quintremin led the protests against the Dam construction. Their actions marked a transitional period where Indigenous movements grew in displays of non-violent fights against social abuses of the state against Indigenous life. Indigenous women find themselves at the intersection of the struggle for Indigenous rights and the fight for women's rights. However, Indigenous women do not feel represented by the larger women's rights movement. Their concerns relate to their Indigenous identity and they advocate for Mapuche women leadership, land access, collective upliftment of Indigenous cultures and increased attainment of rights.

In the Spring of 2018, Emilia Nuyado and Aracely Leuquen became the first two women of the Mapuche Indigenous group to join the Chilean Congress. Nuyado and Leuquen are representatives of the Araucania region, where the tensions between the state and the Indigenous peoples are brewing into a bigger conflict. Nuyado intended to increase the social welfare of Mapuches and oppose anti-terrorist legislation against Mapuche groups.

=== COVID-19 ===
Historically, Indigenous groups have little availability to basic social services, and the COVID-19 pandemic showed the disparity in access to public health services. Coupled with the low-equipped hospitals and inadequate preventive sanitation measures in Indigenous towns, Indigenous citizens who traveled to find better health care facilities are discriminated against and language barriers prevent proper treatment. Recent studies have found that Indigenous people were much more likely to die from COVID-19 related deaths and were much more susceptible to the virus than any other group in Chile. Data suggests that in the first five months of the pandemic (August 2020), there were 17.5% more cases for cities with large numbers of Indigenous citizens than communities with smaller or no Indigenous presence.

Following the Chilean government's mishandling of COVID-19, which disproportionately affected Indigenous groups, Mapuche activists gathered in town squares in the Araucania and Biobio regions advocating for Mapuche prisoners. When the virus spread to the prison systems, activists appealed to place Mapuche prisoners in house arrest rather than remaining in prison to avoid unnecessary health risks.

More generally, the Chilean health industry often neglects Indigenous healers or other health based traditions. Government regulations prevent certain rituals such as burying the placenta after giving birth. One Intercultural Hospital, however, in the Araucania region has a wing dedicated to Mapuche healthcare and their traditional medicine. There have been several protests to increase these more inclusive practices throughout the country and improve healthcare options for Indigenous peoples throughout the country.
