= Yahgan language =

Extinct language of Tierra del Fuego

Yahgan
- Yámana
- Háusi Kúta, Yágankuta, Inčikut
- Native to: Argentina and Chile
- Region: Tierra del Fuego
- Ethnicity: Yahgan people
- Extinct: 16 February 2022, with the death of Cristina Calderón
- Revival: 2020s
- Language family: Language isolate
- Writing system: Latin

Language codes
- ISO 639-3: yag
- Glottolog: yama1264
- ELP: Yagan
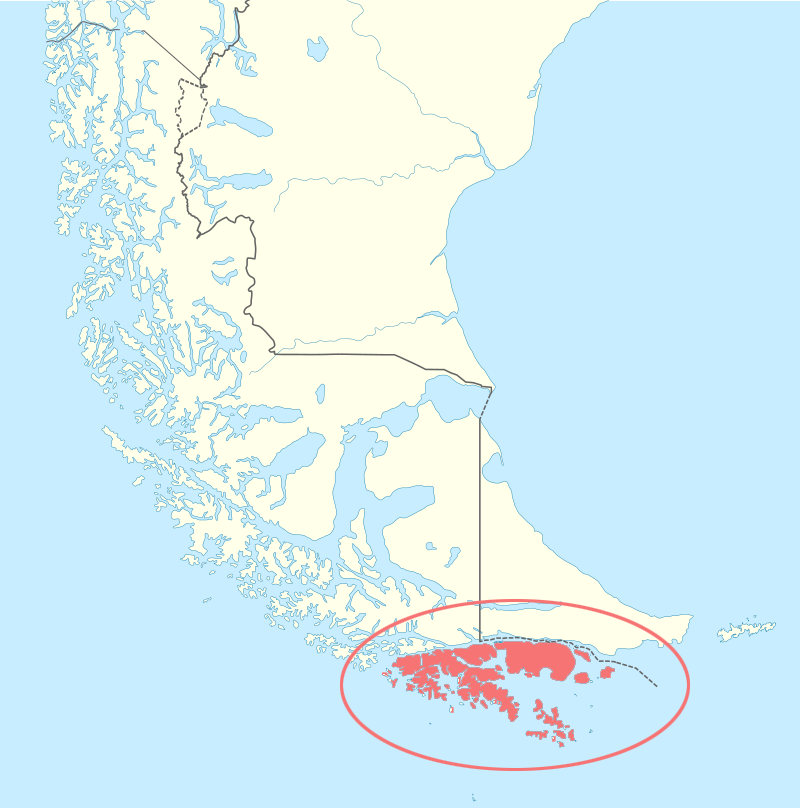

Yahgan or Yagán (also spelled Yaghan, Jagan, Iakan, and also known as Yámana, Inčikut 'Indian speech', Háusi Kúta, or Yágankuta) is an extinct language that is one of the indigenous languages of Tierra del Fuego, spoken by the Yahgan people.

Yahgan is regarded as a language isolate, although some linguists have attempted to relate it to Kawésqar and Chono.

== Geographical distribution and vitality ==
Yahgan was also spoken briefly on Keppel Island in the Falkland Islands at a missionary settlement. In 2017, Chile's National Corporation of Indigenous Development convened a workshop to plan an educational curriculum in the Yahgan language, and in June 2019 it planned to inaugurate a language nest in the community of Bahía Mejillones, near Puerto Williams. The government also funded the publication of a "concise and illustrated dictionary" of the Yahgan language.

Following the death of Cristina Calderón (1928–2022) of Villa Ukika on Navarino Island, Chile, no native speakers of Yahgan remain.

== Phonology ==
=== Vowels ===
There are three analyses of the phonological system of Yahgan, which differ in many details from one another. The oldest analysis is Thomas Bridges' dictionary (1894) based on the English Phonotypic Alphabet; from the middle of the 20th century by Haudricourt (1952) and Holmer (1953); and towards the end of the 20th century, by Guerra Eissmann (1990), Salas y Valencia (1990), and Aguilera (2000).

	Front	Central	Back
Close	i		u
Mid	e	ə	o
Open	æ	a	

All vowels are long in stressed syllables. Vowel /a/ is the most frequent. It may be pronounced as a schwa [ə] in syllables in pretonic or post-tonic position. In final tonic syllables, vowels /i/ and /u/ may become a diphthong. Vowels /i/ and /o/ are very unstable in final unaccented syllables, alternating with /e/ and /u/ respectively.

=== Consonants ===
	Labial	Alveolar	Post- alveolar	Velar	Glottal
Nasal	m	n			
Plosive	p	t	tʃ	k	ʔ
Fricative	f	s	ʃ	x	h
Rhotic		ɾ	ɻ		
Approximant		l	j	w	

=== Morphophonology ===
Yahgan shows a number of sandhi effects on consonants and vowels. For instance, the terminal -i of teki 'to see, recognize' when affixed by -vnnaka 'to have trouble/difficulty doing' becomes -e:- of teke:vnnaka 'to have trouble recognizing/seeing'

In syllables reduced through morphophonetic processes, terminal vowels (-a, -u:) of original bisyllables will often drop (except for -i, which tends to remain, leaving previous material unaffected), and resultant final stops will fricativize (r becomes sh). Aside from losing stress, any vowels preceding these shifted consonants will often shift from tense to lax. Ex. -a:gu: 'for self, with one's own' > -ax-. ata 'to take, convey' > vhr-, and so on. Present tense usually results in the dropping of the final vowel of the infinitival form of the verb and associated changes as above, as does affixation by many, but not all, further derivational and inflectional suffixes beginning with stops, affricates, and other consonants. Ex. aiamaka 'to fight' aiamux-tvlli 'to fight confusedly'.

The sounds m, n, and l are particularly labile in some environments. atama 'to eat' atu:-yella 'to leave off eating' (not atamayella). n from -Vna 'state' is often reduced to -V: when one would expect -Vn-. lt can disappear entirely before some consonants. vla 'to drink', vlnggu: or vnggu: 'to drink'. Initial h- in roots and affixes drops in many instances. Ex. kvna 'to float, be in boat'+ haina 'to walk, go' gives kvn-aina. ng (as in English 'hang') is purely morphophonetic, from terminal n before a velar consonant. Many instances of m before a labial consonant are similarly motivated. w after a passive/reflexive prefix m- often drops. w often vocalizes to u: or o: or drops (depending on preceding material): tu:- causative plus wvshta:gu: 'work' is tu:vshta:gu: 'make work'. y is also relatively labile- after reduced -ata- > -vhr- the suffix -yella 'to leave off' becomes -chella. In combination with preceding -a y often vocalizes: ki:pa 'woman' plus yamalim 'plural animates/people' becomes ki:paiamalim.

=== Stress ===
In recent analyses of the speech of remaining speakers, word stress was felt to be nondistinctive. However, in the mid-19th century Yahga Strait dialect (which is likely not the ancestor of the surviving one) word stress was distinctive at least at the level of the individual morpheme, with stress shifting in regular patterns during word formation. Certain otherwise identical word roots are distinguishable by different stress marking. No information is available about phrase or clause level stress phenomena from the Yahga dialect.

Some roots, particularly those with doubled consonants, exhibit stress on both vowels flanking the doublet. Diphthongs appear to attract stress when they are morphophonetic in origin, sometimes removing it from vowels on both sides that would otherwise be stressed. The first vowel -V- (influenced by the preceding terminal root vowel) in -Vna '(be) in a state' also appears to attract stress, while -ata 'attain' repels stress to the left. Thus the combination -Vnata 'get into a state' is harmonious. Diphthongal attraction often trumps -Vna, drawing stress further left, while two successive diphthongs often have the stress on the rightmost one (counterintuitively). Syllables reduced morphophonetically generally lose whatever stress they might have carried. The vast majority of 'irregular' stress renderings in Bridges' original dictionary manuscript seem to arise from just these five sources.

It may be that these effects help to preserve morpheme boundary and identity information. For instance, given the importance of derivation of verbs from nouns and adjectives using -Vna- and -ata-, shifted stress allows one to differentiate these morphemes from lexical -ata- (common enough) and those -na-'s that are part of lexical roots (also relatively common). -Vna itself will often lose stress and reduce to a tense vowel before other suffixes, leaving the shifting as a hint of its underlying presence.

Stress can also differentiate otherwise identical voice morpheme strings: tú:mu:- causative reflexive (get someone else to do/make one) from tu:mú:-(1) the causative of making oneself seem, or pretend to be in some state, and tu:mú:-(2) the circumstantial (tu:- allomorph before m-) of same (i.e. to seem/pretend at any specified time or place, with any particular tools, for any reasons, etc.). Circumstantial T has different allomorphs- some having following stressable vowel, others not- this also complicates matters for the learner but may also help disentangle morpheme boundaries for the listener.

=== Sound symbolism ===
There appears to be a great deal of remnant sound symbolism in the Yahgan lexicon. For example, many roots ending in -m encode as part of their senses the notion of a texturally softened positive curve (similar to -mp in such words as lump or hump in English), while an -l in similar position often shows up when the reference is to bloody core parts, often out from once safe confinement inside the body. Many roots with initial ch- refer to repeated, spiny extrusions, final -x to dry, hard-edged, or brittle parts, and so on.

The historical sources of these patterns cannot be known for sure, but it may be possible that there was at one time a shape and texture classifier system of some sort behind them. Such systems are rather common in South American languages.

There is little direct onomatopoeia recorded by Bridges, despite descriptions of highly animated imitative behavior on the part of speakers being recorded in the late 19th century. Several bird names are perhaps reduplications of calls (or other nonvocal behavior), and there are a couple of imitative cries and sound words. Most words denoting sounds end in an unproductive verb-deriving suffix -sha (in at least one case -ra, and r is known to alternate with sh), which may be derived from the Yahgan root ha:sha 'voice, language, uttered words, speech, cry', or vra 'to cry' — e.g. gvlasha 'to rattle'.

In the Bridges dictionary of the language one may note several otherwise identical terms differing only in whether they are spelled with an s or a ch — e.g. asela/achela 'skin'. It is not known whether this was dialectal, dialect mixture, ideolectal, gender-based usage or a real grammatical variation such as might occur with augmentative/diminutive sound symbolic shifting.

== Alphabet ==
The alphabet currently sanctioned officially in Chile is as follows:

a, æ, ch, e, ö, f, h, i, j, k, l, m, n, o, p, r, rh, s, š, t, u, w, x.

A simplified orthography is a variant of the old Bridges system, created for online use on the Waata Chis discussion list on Yahoo Groups and elsewhere. It has tense and lax vowels as well as voiced and voiceless consonants. In the system, tenseness is marked by colon (:) following the vowel sign: a, a:, ai, au, e, e:, i, i:, iu:, o, o:, oi, u, u:, v (pronounced as a schwa, not /v/), all corresponding to unique graphemes in the Bridges orthography. The consonants are b, d, ch, f, g, h, j, k, l, m, n, ng, p, r, s, sh, t, w, x, y, z, all corresponding to unique Bridges graphemes. Some are found only in restricted environments. The phonemes hm, hn, hl, hr, hw, and hy are used as well, and are digraphs in the earlier Bridges writings, but single graphemes in later ones.

Still later, Bridges made further orthographic modifications: w, h, and y became superscripts, and à is read as ya, á as ha, and ā as wa. Superscripts could combine to give hw, hy, etc. Because iu: could now be represented by u: plus y- superscript (ù:), and because the original graphemes for u: and u were easily confused with each other as well as with the now-superscripted w, Bridges began using the now-redundant grapheme for iu: (approximately ų) for u: in his renderings. All of these changes took place in a very short time frame, and have led to substantial confusion on the part of later scholars.

In addition, Bridges' modifications of the 19th century phonetic alphabet of Alexander Ellis also included a number of signs meant for transliterations of foreign terms.

There are some ambiguities in Bridges' renderings. He himself notes that g/k, j/ch, d/t and p/f are, in many instances, interchangeable. In certain environments s and sh are hard to distinguish (as before high front vowels). The same goes for ai versus e: and au versus o:. Such ambiguities may go far to help explain the loss or lack of contrasts in the surviving dialect.

=== Pronunciation ===
Letter	Letter name pronunciation	IPA sound	Example word			
Letter	Letter name pronunciation	IPA sound	Word	IPA pronunciation	English meaning	Spanish meaning
A	a	/a/	Ánan	ánan	Canoe	Canoa
Æ	æ	/æ/	Mæpi	mæpi	Jonquil (rush daffodil)	Junquillo
Ch/Č	tʃe	/tʃ/	Číli	tʃíli	Wave	Ola
E	e	/e/	Ekóle	ekóle	One	Uno
Ö/Ǎ	ə pejpi	/ə/	Lǎm	lɘm	Sun	Sol
F	ef	/f/	Taflá	taflá	Fat	Gordo
H	ha	/h/	Halajélla	halajélːa	I leave you (farewell)	Los dejo
I	i	/i/	Ílan	ílan	Southern wind	Viento sur
J/Y	jot	/j/	Ječéla	jetʃéla	Dog	Perro
K	ka	/k/	Kuluána	kuluána	Grandma	Abuela
L	el	/l/	Lufkié	lufkié	Owl	Lechuza
M	em	/m/	Masákon	masákon	Father-in-law	Suegro
N	en	/n/	Nítral	nitrál	Needle	Aguja
O	o	/o/	Ofkís	ofkís	Ears	Orejas
P	pe	/p/	Pušaki	puɕaki	Wood	Leña
R/Rr	ar	/r/	Kárrpo	kárpo	Cormorant	Cormorán
Rh	eɹ	/ɹ/	Wárho	wáɹo	Cave	Cueva
Ř	ɹʃ	/ɹʃ/	Ákař	ákaɹʃ	House, hut, tent	Casa, choza, carpa
S	es	/s/	Síma	síma	Water	Agua
Š	ɕa	/ɕ/	Šúša	ɕúɕa	Penguin	Pingüino
T	te	/t/	Tapeá	tapeá	Mom	Mamá
U	u	/u/	Umašamái	umaɕamái	Barberry	Calafate
W	wáu	/w/	Wilóila	wilóila	Skua	Salteador
X	xa	/x/	Xíxa	xíxa	Canal	Canal

== Grammar ==
=== Syntax ===
Yahgan exhibits extensive case marking on nouns and equally extensive voice marking on verbs. Because of this, word order is relatively less important in determining subject and object relations. Most of the clauses in the three published biblical texts, the dictionary, and the various grammars show either verb medial or verb final orders. Certain clause types are verb initial, but are the distinct minority.

Further analysis of the biblical texts is showing that the Yahga dialect allowed for semantic reordering of constituents. For instance, if SVO is considered the default order for subject and object flanking the verb, then when O is left-shifted (SOV) there is often a sense that the object nominal has more say in his/her patient-hood than if kept to the right of the verb. Similarly, when the subject is right-shifted (VSO) its agent-hood appears often less than what one would expect. It will remain to be seen how pervasive this principle is in the language, and how intricately it interacts with Tense-Aspect-Mood and Polarity marking, topicalization, focus, etc.

The adverb kaia 'fast, quick(ly)' can be used lexically to modify predications, but in the three biblical texts it is also apparently used to mark the second component clause in 'if-then' types of constructions. There is no mention made of this in surviving grammars, nor in the dictionary glosses of kaia. The progressive verb suffix -gaiata may be related.

=== Grammaticalization ===
Grammaticalization is a historical linguistic process whereby regular lexical items shift function (and sometimes form) and become part of the grammar structure.

An example of this in Yahgan would be the change of posture verbs into aspectual markers. Yahgan has a system of verbs which denote the posture of an entity: 'stand' məni, 'sit' mu:tu:, 'lie' (w)i:a and others (for instance a:gulu: 'fly/jump', kəna 'float' etc.). In normal lexical usage one could say

hai ha-mu:t-ude: 'I sat'. (hai full pronoun first person singular, ha- bound version unmarked for number, -ude: past tense).
sa sa-məni-de: 'You stood'. (sa full pronoun second singular, sa- bound).

But with the same root in their grammaticalized forms added:

hai ha-məni-mu:t-ude: 'I stood regularly, or as a rule'.
sa sa-muhr-məni-de: 'You often sat, or were ready to sit'.

The semantic bases of such usage seems to the degree of bodily contact with the substratum, vigilance, engagement, etc. Flying/jumping means ceasing some activity of interest entirely and going off to do something else rather suddenly, standing implies readiness to do something else as needed but attending to the activity when one can. Sitting is regular involvement in the activity, though not to the exclusion of other things that need doing. Lying (not just on but also within) is deep involvement, almost to the exclusion of other activities (English 'immersed in', being 'wrapped up in', 'in a rut' 'be up to one's neck/ears in', 'in over one's head', 'buried in (as work)' etc. have similar import). Relative height is another way to look at it- we say we are 'over' with something to mean 'done with' (equivalent to the jump/fly term in Yahgan), with a hint of relative dominance implied as well. While English has a plethora of colorful expressions for denoting such circumstances, Yahgan has reduced the system to a well-defined smallish set of terms from the domain of posture verbs. Such reduction is one symptom of grammaticalization.

Such contact/engagement-based semantic clines are relatively common cross-linguistically, and the phenomenon of posture verbs changing to aspect marking morphemes is well known among linguists, though it is not the only pathway to creating such terms.

A phonetically based cline (based on both oral articulatory position and manner) can be seen in prefixes y- a- u:- in Yahgan, and combinations ya- and u:a-.

- y- denotes an activity begun or intended, but not completed
- a- seems to imply continuation
- u:- removal of impediments to the completion of the activity

Combined forms ya- and u:a- appear to accentuate the continuous part of the activity.

In North America, languages of the Siouan and Chemakuan families have similarly structured basic systems (Siouan prefixal, Chemakuan suffixal), but mostly with spatial reference. i- is standing out, away from some surface, a- is surface contact, and u- is containment within a surface, though there are also processual and figure/ground senses involved. Note that standing away minimizes surface contact. Other language families have distance demonstratives which follow similar phonological clines. It is possible that there may be historical connections between the y- form and ki:pa 'woman' and u:- and u:a 'man', which when verbalized apparently refer to less and more forceful or determined attempts to achieve respectively. Verbs ya:na 'to intend, wish' and wa:na 'pass, surpass', as well as u:a- 'do fiercely, forcibly' may be related, with suffixal -na on the first forms.

Horizontal movement verbs commonly change, cross-linguistically, into tense markers. Yahgan shows evidence of such shifts as well.

=== Pronouns ===
The three personal pronoun bases are: h- first person/proximal, s- second person/near distal, k- third person/further distal. These are also the forms found as bound prefixes on verbs.

Free/emphatic forms:

Nominative
	singular	dual	plural
1st person	hai	hipai	haian
2nd person	sa	sapai	san
3rd person	kǎnjin	kǎndee(i) or Yámana pronunciation: [kənde:u:]	kǎndaian

Accusative
	singular	plural
1st person	haia	haiananima
2nd person	skaia	sananima
3rd person	kǎnjima	kǎndaiananima

=== Demonstratives ===
The demonstrative bases are the same historically as those of the pronouns:

- hauan: 'here'
- hauanchi: 'this'
- siu:an: 'there (close)'
- siu:anchi: 'that (close)'
- kvnji: 'that (further away)'

=== Adjectives ===
Yahgan possesses a large number of adjective roots, especially those referring to physical states of matter, health, psychological states, etc. Many do double duty as nouns, adverbs, less often without derivation as verbs. Nouns and adjectives can be verbalized by adding -Vna '(be) in a state', or -ata 'become' or both -Vnata 'develop into a state' (where the identity of V is influenced by the final vowel of the root, but is often not identical to it). Such verbalizations are exceedingly common in the dictionary, and can be further derived and inflected.

lvmbi → lvmbi:na → lvmbi:nata → lvmbi:nuhrka:taka → tu:lvmbi:nuhrchella
{'dark, black'} {} {'be dark'} {} {'become dark'} {} {'incrementally become dark'} {} {'cause to leave off becoming dark'}

Adjectives in Yahgan generally have predicative value when following a noun, but are attributive when preceding. There are large numbers of adjective-noun compounds in the language. Examples of attributive adjectives preceding the noun:

- yaus-u:a 'a lying man, i.e. a liar'
- yaus-ki:pa 'a lying woman'
- yeka-kaiiu:ala 'a young child'
- hu:lu:-a:nan 'a large canoe'

Examples of predicative adjectives following a noun:

- lvn-tauwa 'tight-tongued i.e. tongue-tied'
- yvsh-duf 'weak-handed i.e. not dexterous'

Some more commonly used suffixal forms creating adjectives are:

- -kuru: 'wishing, wanting to X'
- -pun 'having no ability to resist X'ing'
- -Vta 'disposed towards X(ing)'
- -vnnaka 'having difficulty Xing or unable to X'
- -a:ru:gata 'troubled doing X'
- -siu:wa:ta 'tired of X or Xing'
- -Vtas 'doing X well'

Examples:

- a:musha:kuru: 'liking to pray'
- u:ku:tu:mvra-siu:wa:ta 'tired of explaining'
- i:kama:natas 'good at writing'

As with other adjective roots, these suffixed forms may be further derived as in the lvmbi example above.

=== Adverbs ===
Adverbs are the one-word class that appears to allow for productive reduplication.

chilla → {chilla chilla}
'again' {} {'again and again'}

=== Nouns ===
The physical environment in which the Yahgan people lived was relatively poor in land resources, and historically they spent little time in the interior. It is understandable, then, that the vocabulary reflects this. There are many fewer names for land animals and plants than one might expect based on what is found in other languages from other, richer natural environments. The sea coast was a different matter, and the language had many terms for sea birds and ocean life.

Yahgan emphasized interconnected parts over unanalyzed wholes (also reflected in their verb serialization). Body parts are finely differentiated, as are social relationships. The vocabulary contained a vast number of deverbalized nouns.

Personal names often derived from the name of the place of birth- for instance, a man born in Ushuaia (meaning 'bay (waia) in the upper back (ushsha)') might be Ushuaia-njiz. Alternatively one might use the case form -ndaulum 'from' and u:a 'man' giving Ushuaia-ndaulum-u:a.

Subject nouns take no overt case marking (subject coreference is on the verb instead). Nouns can be marked for accusative, genitive, dative, locative, instrumental and other cases. Geographical information can be incorporated into the string, as can information about number, collectivity, definiteness, etc. Most of these marks are suffixal.

In the three biblical texts there are numerous complex noun phrases with very involved case relations. It is unknown whether this is characteristic of speaker usage or an invention of the missionary Bridges.

Verbs can be nominalized through a variety of means, particularly by the prefixation of circumstantial T (with its various allomorphs) and/or suffixation of participial morphemes:

- -shin 'past participle'
- -(k)un 'present participle'
- -Vmvs 'future participle'.

Examples:

- ts-ta:gu: 'to give at some particular time, in some stated place, using some tool', or 'a gift'
- teki-shin 'when X saw, or the one who saw'
- wvle:wa twi:amanana-shin 'The boy who lived'
- ts-ta:pvn-a:mvs 'the one who will die'

=== Verbs ===
Verbs in Yahgan are often compounded ("serialized"). Bound subject pronouns (ha- 1st, sa- 2nd, kv- 3rd), unmarked for number, are prefixed, coming before voice prefixes (such as ma(m)- passive, tu:- causative, u:- permissive, T- circumstantial (with allomorphs t-, tv-, tu:-, ts-, chi:-, chi-, ch-), l- back, in response to, etc.). Aspect (such as progressive -gaiata-), tense (for instance -vde: simple past, -u:a simple future, with added increments -vde:aka 'further past', -u:ana 'further future), and mood (generally in that order), etc. are suffixal, along with the two 'benefactive' suffixes -a:gu: 'for self', -ya:gu: 'for another'. Number within the verb (number of subjects or acts) can be encoded by overt marking (once -ata, twice -a:pai/-pikin-, several times -a:misiu:, plural -isin-/-u:sin-, or even none -apisiu:) or the many different distinct plural verbs (for instance mvni 'sg. to stand', palana 'pl. to stand'; ata 'sg. to take, convey', tu:mi:na 'pl. to take, convey').

Ex. i:nan haian kvndaiananima ha-ts-tu:-uhr-gaiat-u:sin-de:-aka a:nan 'We (haian) were making them (kvndaiananima) take (uhr < ata 'take') the boat (a:nan) during (ts- circumstantial plus -n locative on) the winter (i:na) a while ago'.

A handful of verbs form doublets where one of the pair seems to have an unproductive reversative suffix possibly related to the form -a:gu: '(do) for oneself'. For instance ma:na 'to lend', ma:na:ku: 'to borrow'.

In addition to normal serialization Yahgan also exhibits complex verb stems of a type relatively common in western North America, where the main verb is flanked by instrument/body part manner of action prefixes and pathway/position suffixes. The prefixes are part of a larger, more open system of elements marking various kinds of causes or motivations, grading off into more grammaticalized voice marking. Many of the path/position suffixes (especially posture verbs) do double duty as sources for more grammaticalized aspectual morphology. Tense suffixes seem to derive historically from horizontal motion verbs, and together with the more vertical postural aspect forms, make an interesting Cartesian-style coordinate system for dealing with the temporal dimension.

-aku:- -(a)pvna- -kvna
{by striking (Note: from aki 'strike' plus -u:- permissive/causative))} {kill/die} {in a boat or afloat}
to kill by striking while afloat

-alagvnat- -u: -tekil-ata- -man-a:tsikvri-
{to stand by watching} {and let} {step completely} out
say a person one does not like out of the house into the line of gunfire without warning or stopping him

A small number of commonly used verb roots have irregular present tenses. Instead of dropping the final vowel (triggering reductive processes) these forms instead add -ata after the vowel is dropped. Examples: mu:tu: 'to sit'/'to be', present mu:ta (from mu:t-ata), wi:a 'to lie'/'to be', present wi:ata, kvna 'to float'/'to be', present ga:rata. In the last example note that this seemingly suppletive present may in fact hark back to the original historical form, and infinitival kvna may be the changed one.

The form mvra 'to hear' has grammaticalized into an evidential suffix -mush 'hearsay'. Ex. hauanchi isin wuru: yamanaiamalim ma:maia-mushun-de: 'They say that in this land many men died'. There are several other evidential suffixes, differentiating sensory mode (hearing, sight, etc.) as well as time. mvra also finds modal use in the clitic space that often follows the first substantive in the sentence: kvnjin MUSH yamana:mu:ta, kvndaian-da:gia kv-teki-sin-de: kvnjima hauanchi moala 'He MUST be alive, because they (the ones who told me about it) saw him today'. There are other modal verbs also found in this space.

There is little or no reduplication evident on the Yahgan verb, and sound symbolism of the augmentative/diminutive type appears to be largely lexicalized. On the other hand, Yahgan exhibits a good deal of remnant sound symbolism in the verb, similar to what one sees in English.

A good number of verbs seem to form small 'word families' which have slight semantic differences which may have been encoded using sound symbolism (as one often sees, for instance, in some languages of the Austroasiatic stock). For instance haina 'go, walk lightly' versus u:unna 'walk heavily, plod'. In such cases the original symmetry of form seems often to have been distorted by historical changes.

== Vocabulary ==
Included below are some basic Yahgan words.

- man: yagan, yámana (Bridges ya:gan, yamana)
- woman: kíppa (Bridges ki:pa)
- dog: yašála, ješæla (Bridges yvshvla (v schwa))
- house: tugaguu
- blood: sápa (Bridges sa:pa)
- arm: kaméin, kamæn (Bridges ka:main)
- heart: sáeskin, sæskin (Bridges svskin)
- moon: hanúha, hanúxa (Bridges hannu:ka)
- star: ahpérnih, apærnix (Bridges apvranix)
- rain: paléna (Bridges belakana)
- water: síma (Bridges sima)
- fog: fóka, háoka (Bridges hauaka, also 'cloud')
- sky: wákul (Bridges wa:gun)
- fire: pušáki (Bridges pushaki)
- ash: áfua, axuá, ahuá (Bridges vfwa, vxwa, vhwa)
- day: maóla, mólla (Bridges mo:ala)
- bay, inlet: ushipin (Bridges waia, here likely for ushuwaia)
- canoe: ánan (Bridges a:nan)
- vulva: wahar (Bridges wa:kvri 'bladder', but la:kasha 'the purse', which is a 19th-century English avoidance term for the female genitalia- the two terms may be related, as r often alternated with sh)

== See also ==
- Fuegians
- Mamihlapinatapai
- Selkʼnam
- Alacaluf people (Kawésqar)
- Kawésqar language
- Haush language
- Fuegian languages

== Bibliography ==
- Aguilera Faúndez, Óscar (2000): "En torno a la estructura fonologica del yagán. Fonología de la palabra". Onomazein, Santiago, vol. 5, pp. 233–241.
- Bridges, Thomas (1894): "A few notes on the structure of Yahgan". Journal of the Anthropological Institute of Great Britain and Ireland, London, vol. 23, pp. 53–80.
- Golbert de Goodbar, Perla (1977): "Yagan I. Las partes de la oración". Vicus, Amsterdam, vol. 1, pp. 5–60.
- Golbert de Goodbar, Perla (1978): "Yagan II. Morfología nominal". Vicus, Amsterdam, vol. 2, pp. 87–101.
- Guerra Eissmann, Ana M. (1990): "Esbozo fonológico del yagán", en Actas del Octavo Seminario Nacional de Investigación y Enseñanza de la Lingüística. Santiago: Universidad de Chile y Sociedad Chilena de Lingüística, vol. V, pp. 88–93.
- Guerra Eissmann, Ana M. (1992): "Las fluctuaciones de fonemas en el yagán". Revista de Lingüística Teórica y Applicada, Concepción, vol. 30, pp. 171–182.
- Haudricourt, André (1952): "Yamana", en Antoine Meillet y Marcel Cohen (eds.): Les langues du monde. París: Centre National de la Recherche Scientifique, pp. 1196–1198.
- Holmer, Nils M. (1953): "Apuntes comparados sobre la lengua de los yaganes (Tierra del Fuego)". Revista de la Facultad de Humanidades y Ciencias, Montevideo, vol. 10, pp. 193–223, y vol. 11 (1954), pp. 121–142.
- Salas, Adalberto, y Valencia, Alba (1990): "El fonetismo del yámana o yagán. Una nota en lingüística de salvataje". Revista de Lingüística Teórica y Applicada, Concepción, vol. 28, pp. 147–169 (in Spanish).
