= Fuegians =

Indigenous people of Tierra del Fuego

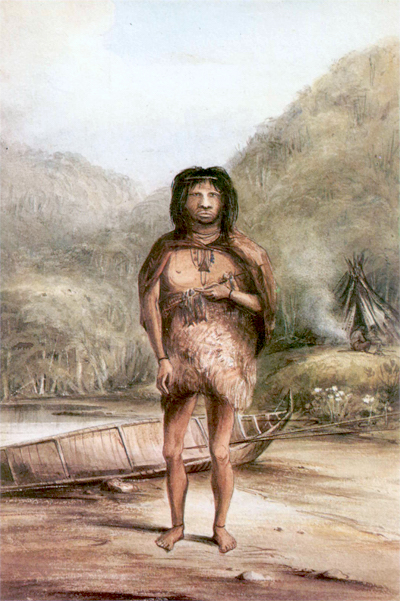
Picture of a Fuegian (possibly a Yahgan) by ship's artist Conrad Martens during a visit of HMS Beagle.

Fuegians are the indigenous inhabitants of Tierra del Fuego, at the southern tip of South America. The name has been credited to Captain James Weddell, who supposedly created the term in 1822.

The indigenous Fuegians belonged to several different ethnic groups including the:

- Selkʼnam, also known as Ona or Onawo
- Haush, also known as Manekʼenk
- Yahgan, also known as Yagán, Yaghan, Yámana, Yamana, or Tequenica
- Kawésqar, also known as Alacalufe, Kaweskar, Alacaluf, or Halakwulup

All of these ethnic groups except the Selkʼnam lived exclusively in coastal areas and have their own languages. The Yahgan and the Kawésqar traveled by birchbark canoes around the islands of the archipelago, while the coast dwelling Haush did not. The Selkʼnam lived in the interior of Isla Grande de Tierra del Fuego and were exclusively terrestrial hunter gatherers who hunted terrestrial game such as guanacos, foxes, tuco-tucos and upland nesting birds as well as littoral fish and shellfish. The Fuegian peoples spoke several distinct languages: both the Kawésqar language and the Yahgan language are considered language isolates, while the Selkʼnam and Haush spoke Chon languages like the Tehuelche on the mainland.

== Ethnonym ==
The name "Tierra del Fuego" may refer to the fact that both Selkʼnam and Yahgan had their fires burn in front of their huts (or in the hut). In Magellan's time Fuegians were more numerous, and the light and smoke of their fires presented an impressive sight if seen from a ship or another island. Yahgan also used fire to send messages by smoke signals, for instance if a whale drifted ashore. The large amount of meat required notification of many people, so that it would not decay. They might also have used smoke signals on other occasions, but it is possible that Magellan saw the smokes or lights of natural phenomena.

== History ==
=== Origin ===
Alongside the Pericúes of Baja California, the Fuegians and Patagonians show the strongest evidence of partial descent from the Paleoamerican lineage, a proposed early wave of migration to the Americas derived from an Australo-Melanesian population, as opposed to the main Amerind peopling of the Americas of Siberian (admixed Ancient North Eurasian and Paleo-East Asian) descent. Further credibility is lent to this idea by research suggesting the existence of an ethnically distinct population elsewhere in South America. According to archaeologist Ricardo E. Latcham the sea-faring nomads of Patagonia (Chono, Kawésqar, Yahgan) may be remnants from more widespread indigenous groups that were pushed south by "successive invasions" from more northern nations.

==== Alternative origin speculations ====
However these previous claims were refuted by multiple genetic and anthropologic studies, such as one study published in Nature in 2018 which concluded that all Native Americans descended from a single founding population which initially split from East Asians c. 36,000 BC, with geneflow between Ancestral Native Americans and Siberians persisting until c. 25,000 BC, before becoming isolated in the Americas at c. 22,000 BC. Northern and Southern Native American subpopulations split from each other at c. 17,500 BC. There is also some evidence for a back-migration from the Americas into Siberia after c. 11,500 BC. Another study published in Nature in 2021, which analysed a large amount of ancient genomes, similarly concluded that all Native Americans descended from the movement of people from Northeast Asia into the Americas. These Ancestral Americans, once south of the continental ice sheets, spread and expanded rapidly, and branched into multiple groups, which later gave rise to the major subgroups of Native American populations. The study also dismissed the existence of an hypothetical distinct non-Native American population (suggested to have been related to Indigenous Australians and Papuans), sometimes called "Paleoamerican". The authors explained that these previous claims were based on a misinterpreted genetic echo, which was revealed to represent early East-Eurasian geneflow (close but distinct to the 40,000 BC old Tianyuan lineage) into Aboriginal Australians and Papuans.

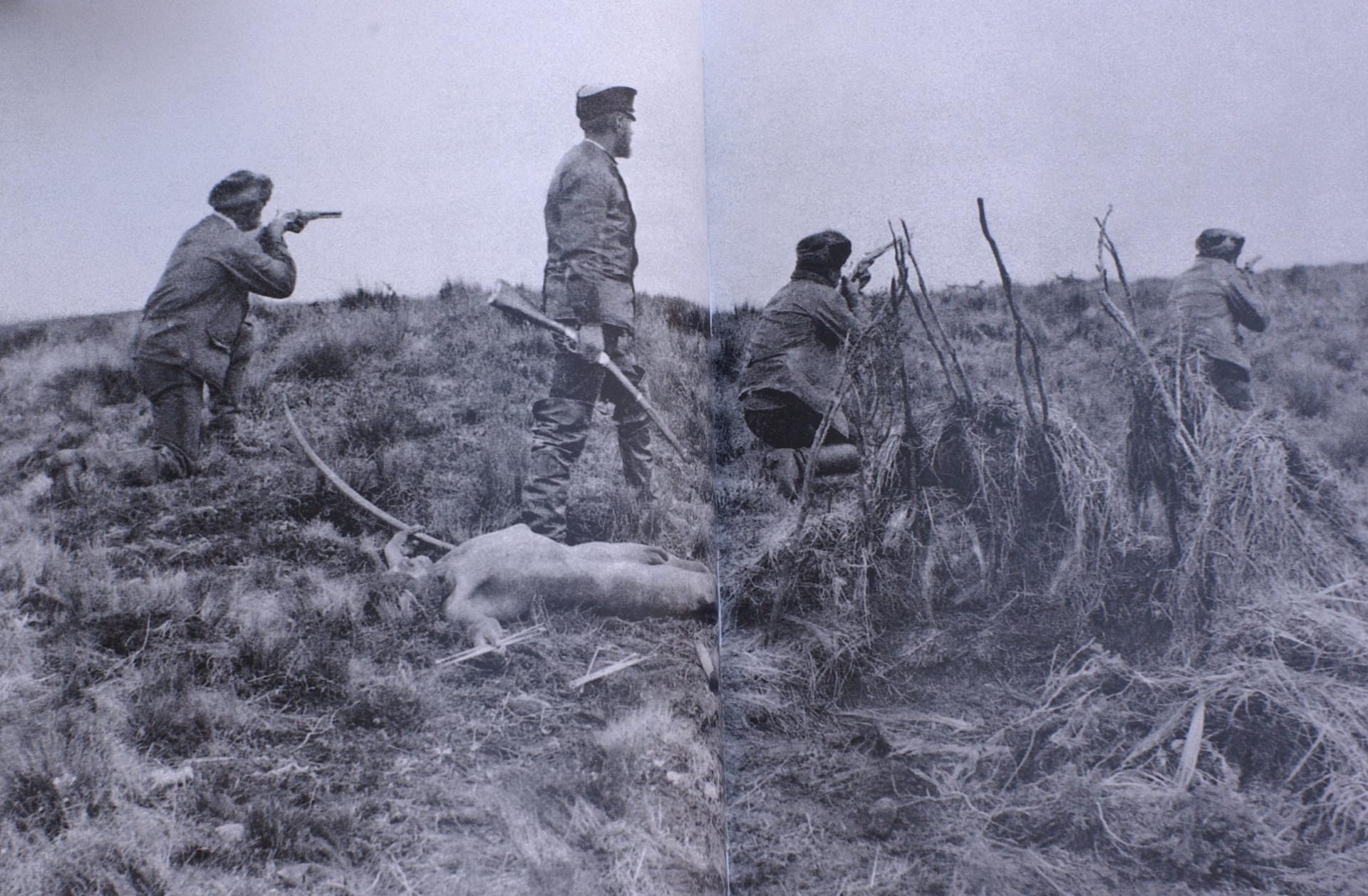
Julius Popper with a killed Selkʼnam. In the late 19th century some estancieros and gold prospectors launched a campaign of extermination against the indigenous peoples of Tierra del Fuego.

=== European contact ===
Distribution of the pre-Hispanic people in the Southern Patagonia

On May 11, 1830, four Yahgan were trafficked to England by the schooner Allen Gardiner, presented to the court, and imprisoned there for a number of years before three were allowed to return, including Fuegia Basket and Jemmy Button. The fourth died of smallpox.

The United States Exploring Expedition came in contact with the Fuegians in 1839. One member of the expedition called the Fuegians the "greatest mimics I ever saw."

When Chileans and Argentines of European descent studied, invaded and settled on the islands in the mid-19th century, they brought with them diseases such as measles and smallpox for which the Fuegians had no immunity. In 1876 a serious smallpox epidemic decimated the Fuegians.

As early as 1878 Europeans in Punta Arenas seeking additional sheep pastures negotiated to acquire large tracts of land on Isla Grande de Tierra del Fuego from the Chilean government just prior to Argentina's and Chile's sovereignty there.

By 1876, Christian missionaries claimed to have converted the entire Yahgan people.

Between 1881 and 1883 the Yahgan population dropped from perhaps 3,000 to only 1,000 due to measles and smallpox. The Fuegian population was devastated by the diseases, and their numbers were reduced from several thousand in the 19th century to hundreds in the 20th century.

=== Selkʼnam genocide ===
The Selkʼnam genocide was authorized and conducted by the estancieros that between 1884 and 1900 murdered many of the indigenous population. Large companies paid sheep farmers or militia a bounty for each Selkʼnam dead, which was confirmed on presentation of a pair of hands or ears, or later a complete skull. They were given more for the death of a woman than a man.

=== Modern history ===
Both Selkʼnam and Yahgan were almost obliterated by diseases brought in by colonization, and probably made more vulnerable to disease by the crash of their main meat supplies (whales and seals) due to the actions of European and American fleets.

== Culture ==
The principal differences in language, habitat, and adaptation techniques did not promote contacts, although eastern Yahgan groups had exchange contacts with the Selkʼnam.

=== Material culture ===
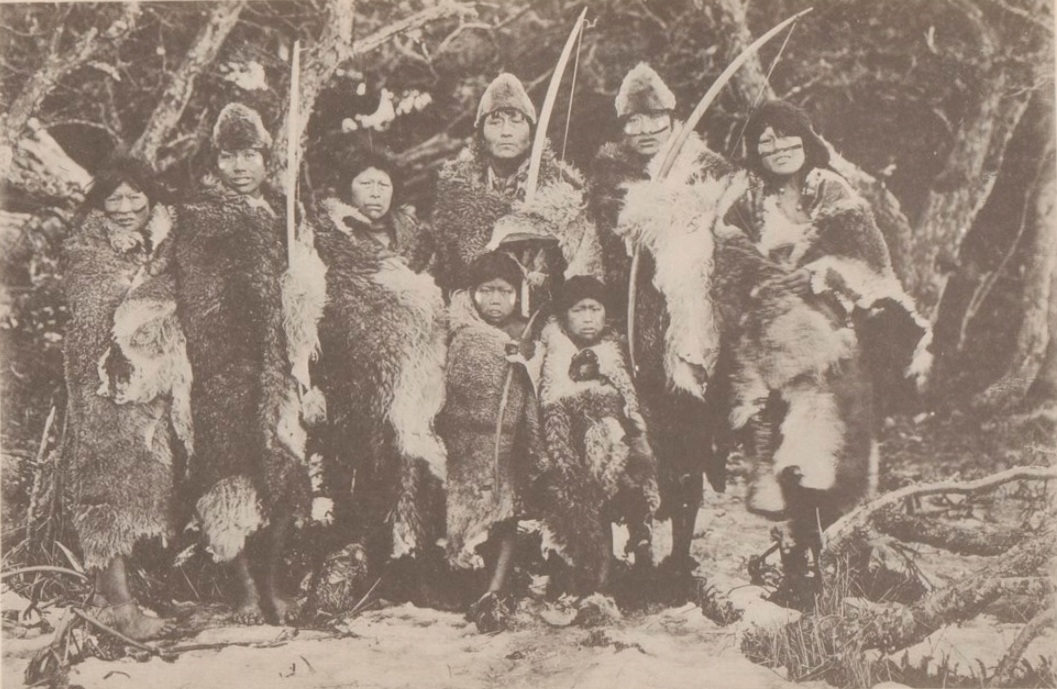
Selkʼnam people, c. 1915

"Archaeological investigations show the prevalence of maritime hunter-gatherer organization throughout the occupation of the region (6400 BP – 19th century)." Although the Fuegians were all hunter-gatherers, their material culture was not homogeneous: the big island and the archipelago made two different adaptations possible. Some of the cultures were coast-dwelling, while others were land-oriented. Neither was restricted to Tierra del Fuego:

- The coast provided fish, sea birds, otters, seals, shellfish in winter and sometimes also whales. Yahgan got their sustenance this way. Kawésqar (living in the Strait of Magellan and some islands), and Chono (living further to the north, on Chilean coasts and archipelagos) were similar. Most whales were stranded but some whaling occurred.
- Selkʼnam lived on the inland plain of the big island of Tierra del Fuego, communally hunting herds of guanaco. The material culture had some similarities to that of the (also linguistically related) Tehuelche living outside Tierra del Fuego in the southern plains of Argentina.

All Fuegian nations had a nomadic lifestyle, and did not need permanent shelters. The guanaco-hunting Selkʼnam made their huts out of stakes, dry sticks, and leather. They broke camp and carried their things with them, and wandered following the hunting and gathering possibilities. The coastal Yahgan and Kawésqar also changed their camping places, traveling by birchbark canoes.

=== Gender ===
There is a belief in both the Selkʼnam and Yahgan nations that women used to rule over men in ancient times, Yahgan attribute the present situation to a successful revolt of men. There are many festivals associated with this belief in both nations.

The patrilineal Selkʼnam and the composite band society Yahgan reacted very differently to the Europeans and it has been suggested that this was due to these facets of their cultural structure.

=== Language ===
The languages spoken by the Fuegians are all extinct, with the exception of Kawésqar. The Selkʼnam language was related to the Tehuelche language and belonged to the Chon family of languages. It is reported to have had more than 30,000 words.

=== Mythology ===
There are some correspondences or putative borrowings between the Yahgan and Selkʼnam mythology. The hummingbird was an animal revered by the Yahgan, and in the Taiyin creation myth explaining the creation of the archipelago's water system, the culture hero "Taiyin" is portrayed in the guise of a hummingbird. A Yahgan myth, "The egoist fox", features a hummingbird as a helper and has some similarities to the Taiyin-myth of the Selkʼnam. Similar remarks apply to the myth about the big albatross: it shares identical variants for both nations. Some examples of myths having shared or similar versions in both nations are:

- the myth about a sea lion and his [human] wife;
- the myth about the origin of death.

At least three Fuegian nations had myths about culture heroes. Yahgan have dualistic myths about the two yoalox-brothers (Yámana pronunciation: [joalox]). They act as culture heroes, and sometimes stand in an antagonistic relation to each other, introducing opposite laws. Their figures can be compared to the Selkʼnam Kwanyip-brothers. In general, the presence of dualistic myths in two compared cultures does not necessarily imply relatedness or diffusion.

Some myths also feature shaman-like figures with similarities in the Yahgan and Selkʼnam nations.

The abundant and nutritious Patagonian blennie (Eleginops maclovinus) was apparently not consumed and rock art suggests it may have had some religious significance.

=== Shamanism ===
Both Selkʼnam and Yahgan had persons filling in shaman-like roles. The Selkʼnam believed their xon (Ona pronunciation: [xon]) to have supernatural capabilities, e.g. to control weather and to heal. The figure of xon appeared in myths, too. The Yahgan yekamush ([jekamuʃ]) corresponds to the Selkʼnam xon.

There are myths in both Yahgan and Selkʼnam nations about a shaman using his power manifested as a whale. In both examples, the shaman was "dreaming" while achieving this. For example, the body of the Selkʼnam xon lay undisturbed while it was believed that he travelled and achieved wonderful deeds (e.g. taking revenge on a whole group of peoples). The Yahgan yekamush made similar achievements while dreaming: he killed a whale and led the dead body to arbitrary places, and transformed himself into a whale as well. In another Selkʼnam myth, the xon could use his power also for transporting whale meat. He could exercise this capability from great distances and see everything that happened during the transport.

== See also ==
- Selkʼnam genocide
- Anne Chapman
- Fuegian languages
- Indigenous Amerindian genetics
- Thomas Bridges
- Julius Popper
