= Fuegian languages =

Indigenous languages of Tierra del Fuego

The Fuegian languages are the indigenous languages historically spoken in Tierra del Fuego by Native Americans. Adelaar lists the Fuegian languages as the Kawésqar language, the Selkʼnam language and the Yaghan language in addition to Chono, Gününa Yajich (also known as Puelche), and the Tehuelche language.

Based on current data, the languages are not considered part of the same language family or linguistic area. Though possible genetic relationships have been proposed to categorize them, "more complete descriptions and more detailed comparative studies are needed" before any claim can be made about genetic relationships. The current consensus is that Kawésqar, Yaghan, and Chono are language isolates and Selkʼnam (also referred to as Ona) is one of the Chon languages, along with Tehuelche and Gününa Yajich.

== Yaghan ==
Yaghan (also referred to as Yahgan or Yámana, among other names) is a language historically spoken in Chile and Argentina. It is considered a language isolate and part of its own Yámana language family. Within Chile, it has been found in Patagonia, Isla Navarino, Puerto Williams, and Ukika. Within Argentina, it has been found in the extreme south of Isla Grande in Tierra del Fuego. As of 2022, Yaghan is now extinct with the death of Cristina Calderón.

There were originally as many as five dialects of Yaghan, but the Yamana people who historically spoke the language diminished in numbers and shifted to Spanish following the arrival of Europeans in Tierra del Fuego.

== Kawésqar ==
Kawésqar (also referred to as Qawasqar or Alacaluf, among other names) is a language spoken in Chile, especially in Puerto Edén. It is also considered a language isolate and makes up the Alacalufan language family. It is close to extinction with "no more than fifteen or sixteen" competent speakers. The Kawésqars, an indigenous population in Chile, have been categorized into groups based on geography but "recognize only a Southern group with linguistic differences". Examples of words in the language (also demonstrating the use of suffixation) are jéksor, meaning 'see', and jeksórfqat, meaning 'saw'.

== Selkʼnam ==
The Selkʼnam language (also referred to as Ona) is an extinct language once spoken in Tierra del Fuego. Its last speakers died in the 1980s. It is considered part of the Chon language family, which also includes Tehuelche and Gününa Küne.

== Decline ==
Yaghan, Kawésqar, and Selkʼnam are all extinct or nearly extinct, and their whose numbers of speakers have declined sharply since the 19th century. One reason for the decline is the drastic reduction in size of the indigenous populations who historically spoke these languages. The Yaghan population, for example, was between 2,500 and 3,000 in the late nineteenth century and plummeted to as low as 40 by 1933, partly by diseases like smallpox, whooping cough and typhoid, introduced by incoming Europeans.

As the indigenous languages of South America have declined, the inhabitants of Tierra del Fuego have come to use Spanish instead. Another reason for this was a discriminatory view of the indigenous languages in South America by the non-indigenous population. Kawesqars, for example, "were looked down on, sometimes with aversion" for speaking their so-called "uncivilized" native tongue and many speakers of Kawésqar refuse to speak it in public as a result.

== Characteristics ==
Though the Fuegian languages are not currently believed to be part of a single linguistic area or language family, there are some properties that are frequent in the languages. They include the presence of voiced and glottalized consonants and frequent compounding, reduplication, and suffixation. Another unifying feature is word order, as all three languages have the object before the verb.

The Fuegian languages are unified in having infrequent retroflex articulations and rare instances of suppletion. A significant obstacle preventing a consensus on any kind of direct relation among the Fuegian languages is the lack of sufficient data. Research on the languages has been limited and is difficult given the minimal number of native speakers remaining.

== See also ==
- Fuegians
