= CONADI =

Chilean institution

National Corporation for Indigenous Development
- Corporacion Nacional de Desarrollo Indigena
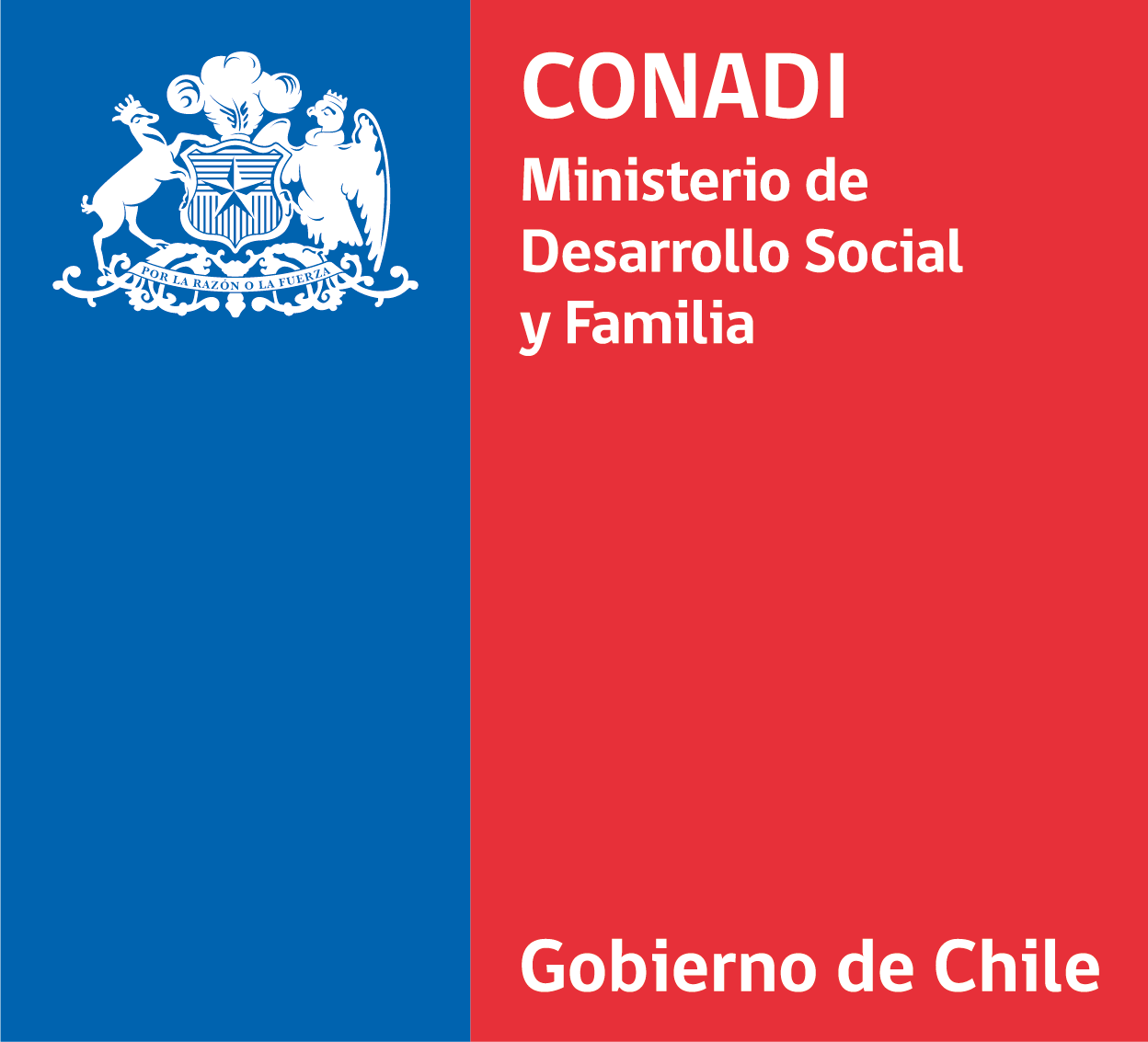
- CONADI

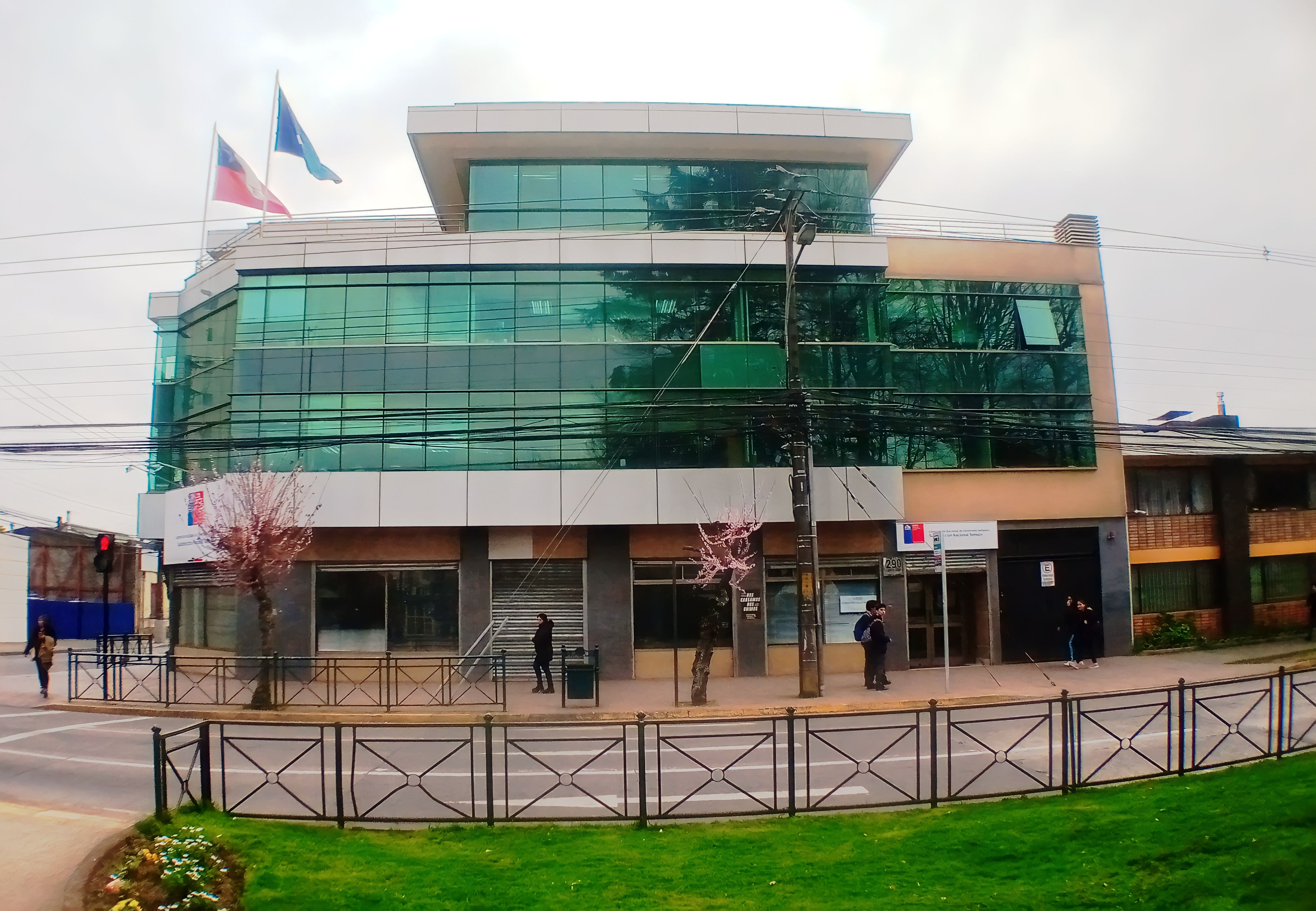
- CONADI's national subdirectorate of Temuco

Government agency overview
- Formed: September 28, 1993
- Preceding Government agency: CEPI
- Superseding Government agency: Government of Chile, Social Development Ministry (es:Ministerio de Desarrollo Social de Chile)
- Jurisdiction: National
- Headquarters: Temuco
- Website: www.conadi.gob.cl

The National Corporation for Indigenous Development, or Corporación Nacional de Desarrollo Indígena (CONADI) in Spanish, is a Chilean institution founded on September 28, 1993, by the "Ley Indigena 19253" ("Indigenous Law").

CONADI's main goal is to promote, coordinate and execute the state's work to support the development of the Indigenous peoples of Chile.

CONADI is overseen by the Social Development Ministry or "Ministerio de Desarrollo Social de Chile". Its headquarters are located in the city of Temuco and it has two subdivisions: Temuco, covering the Bío Bío, Araucanía, Los Lagos and Los Ríos regions, and Iquique, covering the Tarapacá, Antofagasta and Arica y Parinacota regions.

== Background ==
CONADI was founded as a result recommendations made by the Special Commission on Indigenous Peoples or "Comisión Especial de Pueblos Indígenas" (CEPI) which ran from 1990 to 1995 was created by decree No. 30 of May 27, 1990. As a result of its work, CEPI produced a report with three recommendations: reform the national constitution to include indigenous peoples; ratify the Indigenous and Tribal Peoples Convention (ILO Convention No. 169), and create the Indigenous Law that ultimated founded CONADI. The third of these recommendations was approved by the Chilean National Congress and was subsequently promulgated in the Programme for Indigenous Rights (2003). Congress also later ratified ILO Convention No. 169.

== Indigenous Law ==
As part of the initiatives to repair historic damage and encourage the development and social inclusion of indigenous peoples, Chile's Indigenous Law was created in the 1990s. Following the return to democracy, Patricio Aylwin's government established the Special Commission of Indigenous People (Comisión Especial de Pueblos indígenas or CEPI), whose report provided the intellectual framework of the Indigenous Law Ley Indígena or law n° 19 253, promulgated on September 28, 1993, by President Aylwin.

The Indigenous Law recognized all indigenous peoples of Chile, in particular the Mapuche people, victims of the Occupation of the Araucanía, as an inherent part of the Chilean nation. Other indigenous people officially recognized included the Aymara, Atacameña, Colla, Quechua, Rapa-Nui, Yámana and Kawashkar peoples. Later, in 2006, the Diaguita people were also added to the list.

The law established the National Corporation for Indigenous Development (CONADI), which included directly elected indigenous representatives, and advised and directed government programs to assist the economic development of indigenous people.

It also gives indigenous people a voice in decisions affecting their lands, cultures and traditions and provides for bilingual education (legalizing Mapudungun language) in schools with indigenous populations.

Approximately half of the self-identified indigenous population remained separated from the rest of society, largely due to historical, cultural, educational, and geographical factors. Both internal factors and governmental policies had previously limited the ability of indigenous people to participate in governmental decisions affecting their lands, cultures, traditions, and the allocation of natural resources. Indigenous people also experienced some societal discrimination and reported incidents in which they were attacked and harassed. A 2003 Ministry of Planning survey reported that indigenous people earned 26% less than nonindigenous citizens for similar work.

Chile is one of the 23 countries to have signed and ratified the only binding international law concerning indigenous peoples, Indigenous and Tribal Peoples Convention, 1989. It was adopted in 1989 as the International Labour Organization Convention 169. Chile ratified the convention in 2008. In November 2009, a court decision in Chile, considered to be a landmark in indigenous rights concerns, made use of the ILO convention 169. The Supreme Court decision on Aymara water rights upheld rulings by both the Pozo Almonte tribunal and the Iquique Court of Appeals, and marked the first judicial application of ILO Convention 169 in Chile.

== See also ==
- National Indian Foundation (Brazil)
- Convention No. 169

== Bibliography ==
- Decree N° 30, 27 May 1990 that created the Special Commission on Indigenous Peoples (CEPI) Full text on BCN The National Congress Library online (Biblioteca del Congreso Nacional)
- Indigenous Law N° 19.253 Established the normative to support the development of indigenous peoples and created the National Corporation for the Indigenous Development "Corporación Nacional de Desarrollo Indígena" (CONADI). Full text in Spanish CONADI official website and BCN - National Congress Library online
- Historical Truth and New Deal with Indigenous Peoples Commission "Comisión Verdad Histórica y Nuevo Trato con los Pueblos Indígenas" (2003) Historical Truth and New Deal with Indigenous Peoples Commission full report. Santiago, Chile.
- Muñoz, Bernardo. 1999 Property rights and Indigenous peoples Derechos de propiedad y pueblos indígenas. ISSN 1020-5179 ISBN 92-1-321522-3 CEPAL United Nations, Santiago, Chile Full text in CEPAL website
- Indigenous Rights Program of the Institute of Indigenous Studies at the Universidad de la Frontera "Programa de Derechos Indígenas del Instituto de Estudios Indígenas de la Universidad de la Frontera". (2003). The rights of indigenous peoples in Chile Report of the Indigenous Rights Program Los derechos de los pueblos indígenas en Chile Informe del Programa de Derechos Indígenas LOM Ediciones, Santiago, Chile. ISBN 956-282-608-2 Full text in Spanish
- Vergara, Jorge Iván; Foerster, Rolf; Gundermann, Hans (2005). "Instituciones mediadoras, legislación y movimiento indígena de Dasin a Conadi (1953-1994)". Atenea (Concepción) (491). doi:10.4067/S0718-04622005000100006.

== See also ==
- Indigenous peoples in Chile
