= Cristina Calderón =

Last known speaker of Yahgan language (1928–2022)

Illustrious Daughter of the Region of Magallanes and Chilean Antarctica Cristina Calderón
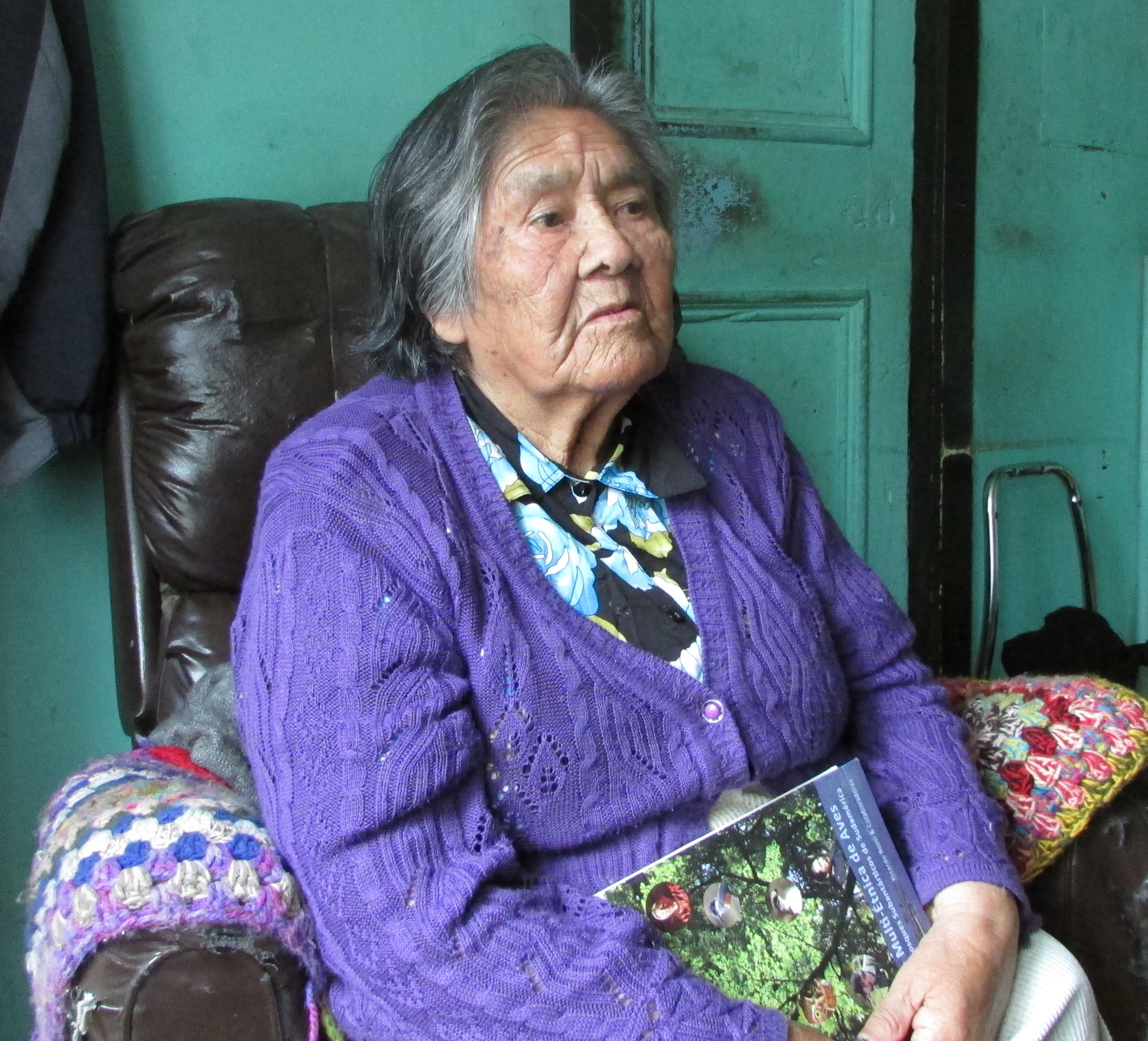
- Calderón in 2013
- Born: 24 May 1928; Robalo, Puerto Williams, Chile
- Died: 16 February 2022 (aged 93); Punta Arenas, Chile
- Occupations: Ethnographer, craftswoman, writer, cultural activist
- Known for: Last known native speaker of the Yahgan language and last living full-blooded Yahgan person
- Spouses: Felipe Garay (m. 1943; died 1948) Lucho Zárraga (died 1962) Teodosio González (m. 1964; died 2009)
- Children: 10, including Lidia González

Cristina Calderón Harban (24 May 1928 – 16 February 2022) was a Chilean ethnographer, craftswoman, writer and cultural activist who was the last living full-blooded Yahgan person after the death of her 84-year-old sister Úrsula in 2005. By 2004, Calderón (often referred to as simply "Abuela", Spanish for "grandmother") and her sister-in-law Emelinda Acuña were the only two remaining native speakers of the Yahgan language, an indigenous language in Tierra del Fuego.

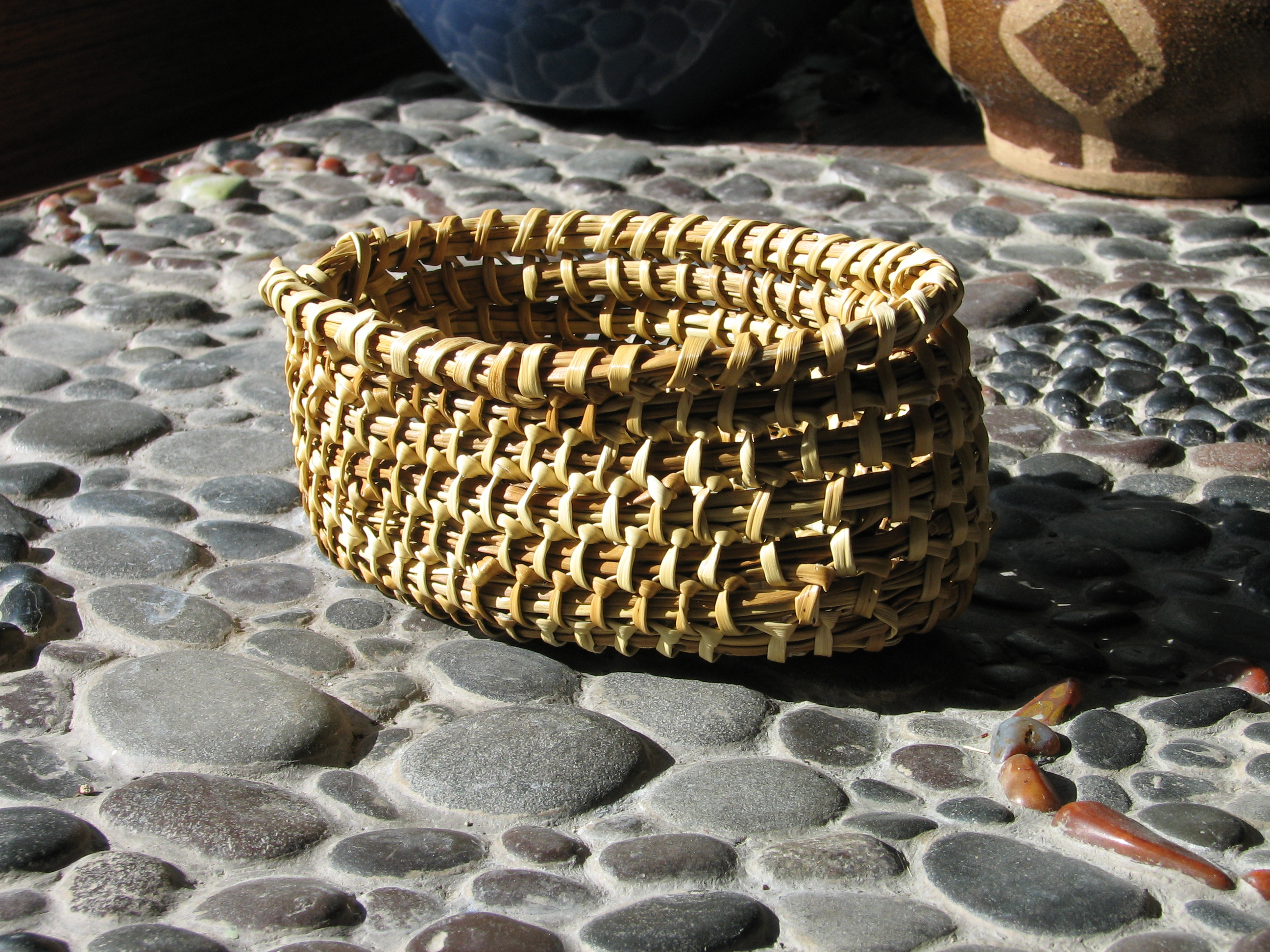
Traditional Yahgan basket, woven by Abuela Cristina Calderón

== Early life ==
Calderón was born in Robalo, Puerto Williams, Navarino Island, on 24 May 1928 to Juan Calderón (Akačexaninčis) and Carmen Harban (Lanixweliskipa). Her father was one of the informants of missionary and anthropologist Martin Gusinde. She was orphaned when she was four and was taken in by her grandfather and grandmother Williams Harban (Halnpenš) and Julia (Karpakolikipa), who taught her about Yahgan culture. Her life with her grandparents was one of poverty, and Calderón was often left hungry. Halnpenš died soon after following an assault by a Spaniard, and she was taken in to be raised by her aunt "Granny Gertie", uncle Felipe, and cousin Clara, who further taught her the Yahgan language. As a child, Calderón listened to stories of settler violence and the Yahgan's resistance, went hunting, and learned how to create handicrafts by watching her aunts. She knew only the Yahgan language until she was 9 years old, when she learned Spanish from her peers. She additionally learned English from her aunt Gertie, who stayed at an Anglican mission. As a Yahgan, she and her family were discriminated against by authorities and locals in the area.

Calderón first married at age 15 to an older man named Felipe Garay, a man with a wife who had left him without a divorce, with whom she had three children. The decision was financially motivated and driven by her family, as he could provide well for the orphaned Calderón. Calderón initially refused due to her young age compared to Garay, but eventually listened to her family's request. Garay died of appendicitis in 1948, but due to the lack of a formal divorce, his money went to his other wife. She was pushed back into poverty as a result of her first husband's death, surviving on the support of her relatives, who also lived in poor conditions. Her second husband was Lucho Zárraga, a Selkʼnam man, who worked as a shepherding headman, with whom she had five children. Zárraga died in 1962, possibly of tuberculosis, in Punta Arenas. In 1964, Calderón met her third husband, Teodosio González, a sheep shearer. She had known González since she was young, but was unable to marry him due to external factors. Calderón's close relationship with González was described as something "she had wished for even as a girl". They remained close until González's death in 2009.

== Later life ==
She was often affectionately known as Abuela Cristina, "Grandma Cristina", or simply Abuela, by locals in her community. With her granddaughter Cristina Zárraga and her sister Úrsula Calderón she published a book of Yahgan legends and stories called Hai Kur Mamashu Shis 'I Want to Tell You a Story' in 2005. Zárraga, along with her husband Oliver Vogel, published Yagankuta, a dictionary and storybook of the Yahgan language, in 2010, based on interviews with Calderón. A biography of Calderón was published in 2017 titled "Cristina Calderón, Memorias de mi abuela Yagán" by her granddaughter Cristina Zárraga.

As of May 2019, she was residing in Villa Ukika, near her hometown of Puerto Williams. She was the mother of ten children and grandmother to 19 as of 2017. Calderon spent her time creating traditional handicrafts and sharing Yahgan culture and language with her family. Her daughter Lidia González was elected to represent the Yahgan people in the Chilean Constitutional Convention in 2021.

She died on 16 February 2022, aged 93, at the Hospital Clínico de Magallanes in Punta Arenas as a result of complications from COVID-19. Her death was announced by her daughter, Lidia González, who served as the deputy vice president of the Chilean constitutional convention. The governor of the Magallanes Region, Jorge Flies, declared a three-day mourning period for the region after her death, in addition to the communities of Cabo de Hornos and Puerto Williams. Gabriel Boric, the president-elect of Chile, stated that her "teachings and struggles from the south of the world, where everything begins, will remain alive forever."

== Honors ==
Calderón was recognized by the Government of Chile as the repository and disseminator of the traditional culture and language of the Yahgan people. Calderón was officially declared Illustrious Daughter of the Magallanes Region and Chilean Antarctica. She was also recognized by the National Council of Culture and the Arts as a Living Human Treasure in the framework of the Convention for the Safeguard of Immaterial Heritage, adopted by UNESCO in 2003. Likewise, she was nominated to be one of the fifty heroines in the celebration of the Bicentennial of Chile held in 2010.
