= Yahgan people =

Indigenous people of the Tierra del Fuego

Yahgan Yámana
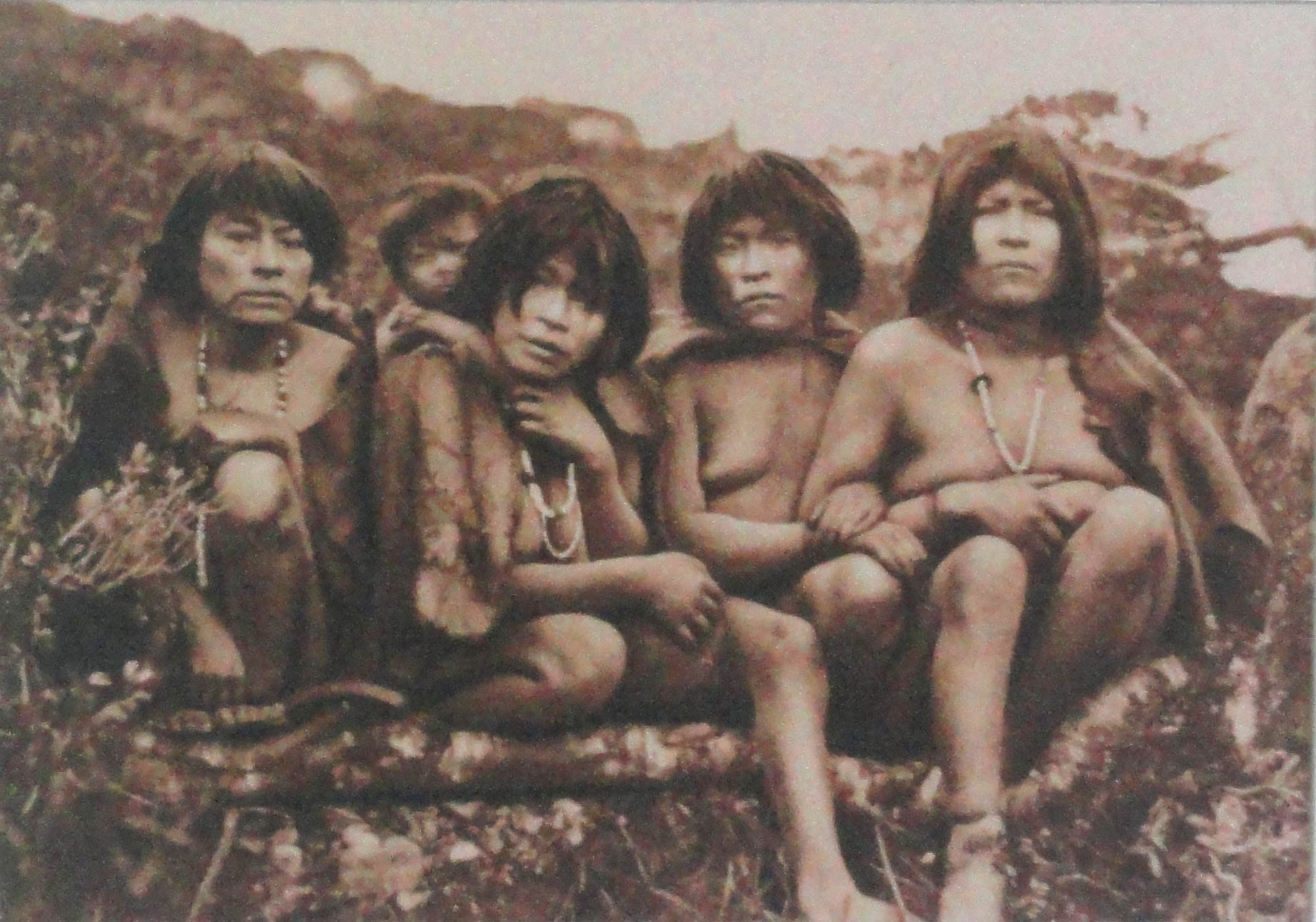
- Yahgan people, 1883

Total population
- 1,433

Regions with significant populations
- Chile: 1,244 (2024)
- Argentina: 189 (2022)

Languages
- Spanish, formerly Yahgan

Religion
- Christian (mostly Protestant), Traditional native religion

Related ethnic groups
- Kawésqar (Alacaluf), Chono

The Yahgan (also called Yagán, Yaghan, Yámana, Yamana, or Tequenica) are a group of Indigenous peoples in the Southern Cone of South America. Their traditional territory includes the islands south of Isla Grande de Tierra del Fuego, extending their presence into Cape Horn, making them the world's southernmost Indigenous human population.

In the 19th century, the Yahgan were known in English as "Fuegians." The name is credited to Captain James Weddell, who supposedly created the term in 1822. The term is now avoided as it can also refer to several other Indigenous peoples of Tierra del Fuego, for example the Selkʼnam.

The Yahgan language, also known as Yámana, is considered a language isolate. Cristina Calderón (1928–2022), who was born on Navarino Island, Chile, was known as the last full-blooded Yahgan and last native speaker of the Yahgan language. It is now regarded as an extinct language, having been entirely replaced by Spanish.

The Yahgan were traditionally nomads and hunter-gatherers who traveled by canoe between islands to collect food. The men hunted sea lions and the women dove to collect shellfish. They also scavenged whale meat, and gathered local vegetation, including berries and mushrooms.

The Yahgan share some similarities with the more northern Chono and Kawésqar (Alacaluf) tribes. These groups share behavioral traits; a traditional canoe-faring hunter-gatherer lifestyle and physical traits such as short stature, being long-headed (dolichocephalic), and having a "low face". Despite these similarities, their languages are completely different.

== Nomenclature and missionary contact ==
In 1871, Anglican missionaries Thomas Bridges and George Lewis established a mission in Tierra del Fuego where they raised their families. Bridges learned the Yahgan language when he decided to remain on Keppel Island at the age of 17. Over more than a decade, he compiled a grammar and 30,000-word Yahgan-English dictionary.

Bridges' second son, Lucas Bridges, also learned the language and was one of the few Europeans to do so. In his 1948 book, a history of that period, he writes that the Yahgan autonym or name for themselves was yamana, meaning person, though modern usage is for man only, not women. The plural is yamali(m)). The name Yahgan was first used by his father, Thomas Bridges, abbreviated from the name of their territory, Yahgashaga, or Yahga Strait. They called themselves Yahgashagalumoala, meaning "people from mountain valley channel" (-lum means 'from'; -oala is a collective term for 'men', the singular being ua). Thomas Bridges first learned the language from the inhabitants of the Murray Channel area, Yahgashaga.

The name Tekenika (Spanish: Tequenica), first applied to a sound in Hoste Island, simply means "I do not understand" (from teki- see and -vnnaka (v schwa) have trouble doing), and evidently originated as the answer to a misunderstood question.

== Adaptations to climate ==
Despite the cold climate, the early Yahgan wore little to no clothing, which only changed after extended contact with Europeans. They were able to survive the harsh climate because:

- They kept warm by huddling around small fires, including those set in boats, to stay warm. The name of "Tierra del Fuego" (land of fire) was based on the many fires seen by passing European explorers.
- They used rock formations on their land to shelter from the elements.
- They covered themselves in animal grease to trap heat and provide an extra layer of fat.
- Their customary resting position was a deep squatting position, which reduced their surface area and helped to conserve heat.

Distribution of pre-Hispanic peoples in Southern Patagonia

== Early Yahgan people ==
The Yahgan may have been driven to the inhospitable Tierra del Fuego by enemies to the north. They were renowned for their complete indifference to the cold weather. Although they had fires and small domed shelters, they routinely went about completely naked, and the women swam in cold waters hunting for shellfish. They were often observed to sleep in the open, completely unsheltered and unclothed, while the Europeans shivered under blankets. A Chilean researcher claimed their average body temperature was warmer than that of a European by at least one degree.

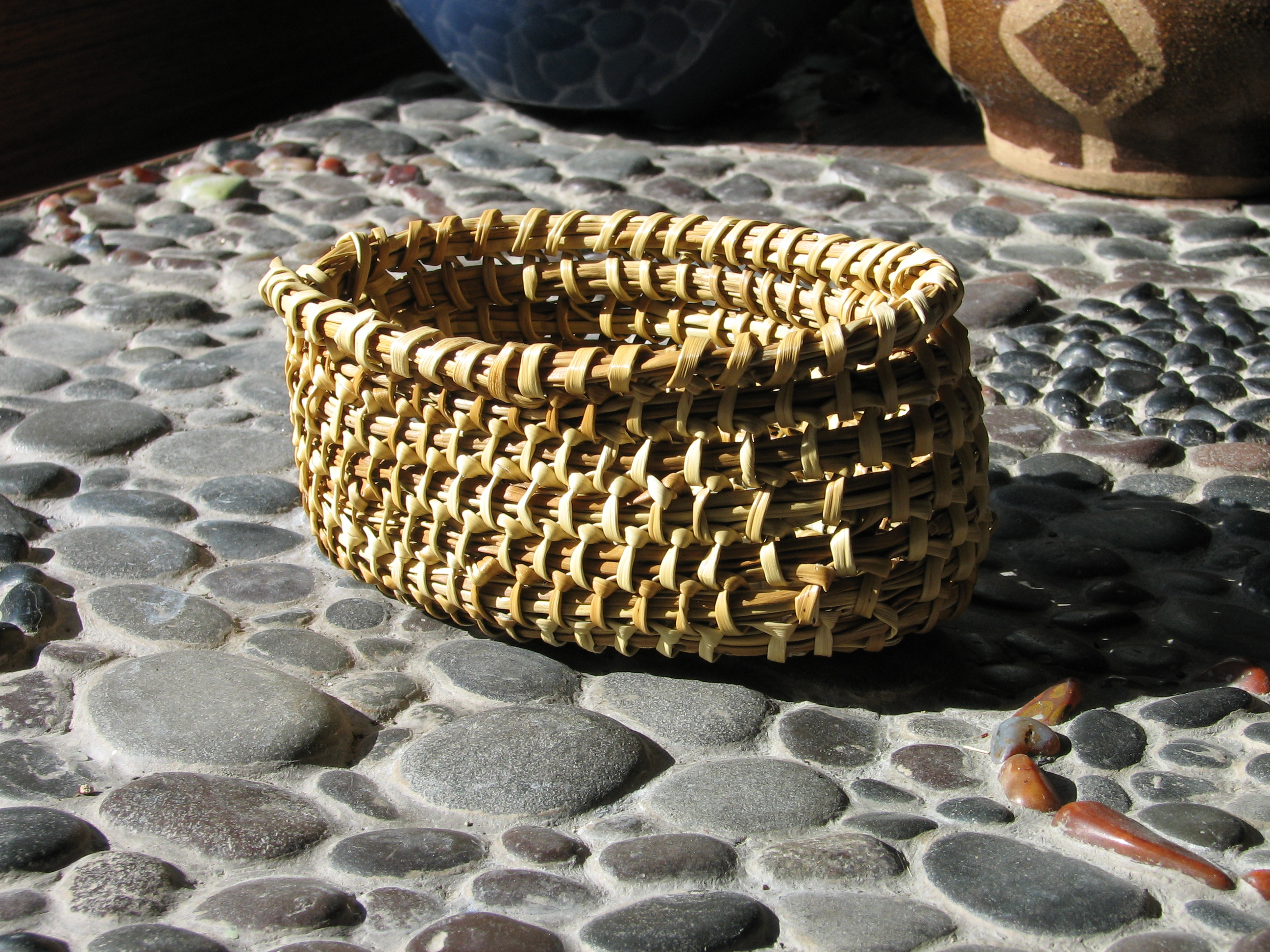
A traditional Yahgan basket, woven with smoked Juncus effusus by Abuela Cristina

Mateo Martinic, in Crónica de las tierras del sur del canal Beagle, asserts that there were five groups of Yahgan people:

- Wakimaala on both shores of the Beagle Channel from Yendegaia Bay to Puerto Róbalo and at the Murray Channel;
- Utumaala from today's Puerto Williams to Picton Island;
- Inalumaala at the Beagle Channel from Punta Divide to Brecknock;
- Ilalumaala in the south-west islands, from Cook Bay to False Cape Horn;
- Yeskumaala in the islands around Cape Horn.

The Yahgan established many settlements in Tierra del Fuego, temporary but often reused. A significant Yahgan archaeological site from the Megalithic period has been found at Wulaia Bay. C. Michael Hogan has called it the Bahia Wulaia (Dome Middens).

The Yahgan domesticated a culpeo known as a Fuegian dog.

== European contact ==
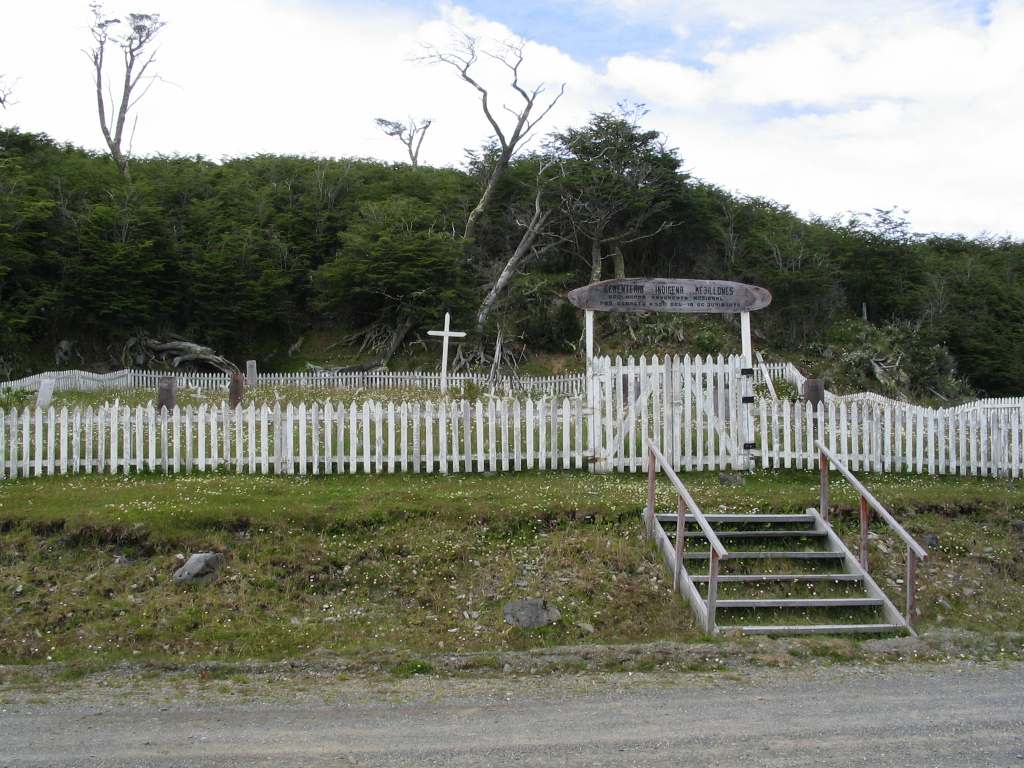
Yahgan cemetery at Mejillones, Navarino Island

The most thorough analysis of the interaction between European explorers and the Yahgan is probably ethnologist Anne Chapman's book European Encounters with the Yamana People of Cape Horn.

Magellan came upon the area around Tierra del Fuego in the early 16th century, but it was not until the 19th century that Europeans became interested in the zone and its peoples. The Yahgan were estimated to number 3,000 people in the mid-19th century, when Europeans started colonizing the area.

The Yahgan left strong impressions on all who encountered them, including Ferdinand Magellan, Charles Darwin, Francis Drake, James Cook, James Weddell, and Julius Popper.

Royal Navy officer Robert FitzRoy became captain of HMS Beagle in November 1828, and continued her first survey voyage. On the night of 28 January 1830, the ship's whaleboat was stolen by Fuegians. During a month of fruitless searching to recover the boat, FitzRoy took guides and then prisoners - who mostly escaped - eventually taking hostage a man known as York Minster, estimated age 26, and a young girl known as Yokcushlu, estimated age nine. A week later, he took another Fuegian hostage, known as Boat Memory, estimated age 20, and on 11 May captured Jemmy Button, estimated age 14. As it was not possible to easily put them ashore, he decided to bring them back to England instead. He taught them "English..the plainer truths of Christianity..and the use of common tools" and took them on the Beagle's return trip to England. Boat Memory died of smallpox soon after arriving in Britain but the others briefly became celebrities in England and were presented at court in London in the summer of 1831. On the famous second voyage of HMS Beagle, the three Fuegians returned to their homeland along with a trainee missionary.

They impressed Charles Darwin with their behaviour, in contrast to the other Fuegians Darwin met when the Beagle reached their native lands. Darwin described his first meeting with the native Fuegians in the islands as being:

...without exception the most curious and interesting spectacle I ever beheld: I could not have believed how wide was the difference between savage and civilised man: it is greater than between a wild and domesticated animal, in as much as in man there is a greater power of improvement.

In contrast, he said of the Yahgan Jemmy Button:

It seems yet wonderful to me, when I think over all his many good qualities, that he should have been of the same race, and doubtless partaken of the same character, with the miserable, degraded savages whom we first met here.

A mission was set up for the three Fuegians. When the Beagle returned a year later, its crew found only Jemmy, who had returned to his tribal ways. He still spoke English, assuring them that he did not wish to leave the islands and was "happy and contented" to live with his wife, described by Darwin as "young and nice looking". This encounter with the Fuegians had an important influence on Darwin's later scientific work and would be integrated into his later theories on human evolution specifically.

The Yahgan were eventually decimated by the infectious diseases introduced by Europeans. The Yahgan suffered disruptions to their habitat starting in the early-to-mid 19th-century when European whalers and sealers depleted their most calorie-rich sources of food, forcing them to rely on mussels chopped from rocks, which provided significantly fewer calories for the effort needed to gather and process them. The Yahgan had no concept of property; in the late 19th century when waves of European immigrants came to the area for the nascent gold rush and boom in sheep farming, the Yahgan were hunted down by ranchers' militias for poaching sheep in their former territories.

In Sailing Alone Around the World (1900), Joshua Slocum wrote that when he sailed solo to Tierra del Fuego, European-Chileans warned him the Yahgan might rob and possibly kill him if he moored in a particular area, so he sprinkled tacks on the deck of his boat, the Spray.

In the 1920s, some Yahgan were resettled on Keppel Island in the Falkland Islands by Anglican missionaries in an attempt to preserve the tribe, as described by E. Lucas Bridges in Uttermost Part of the Earth (1948), but they continued to decline in population. The second-to-last full-blooded Yahgan, Emelinda Acuña, died in 2005. The last full-blooded Yahgan, "Abuela" (grandmother) Cristina Calderón, who lived in Chilean territory, died in 2022 age 93 due to complications of COVID-19. She was the last native speaker of the Yahgan language.

== Yahgan today ==
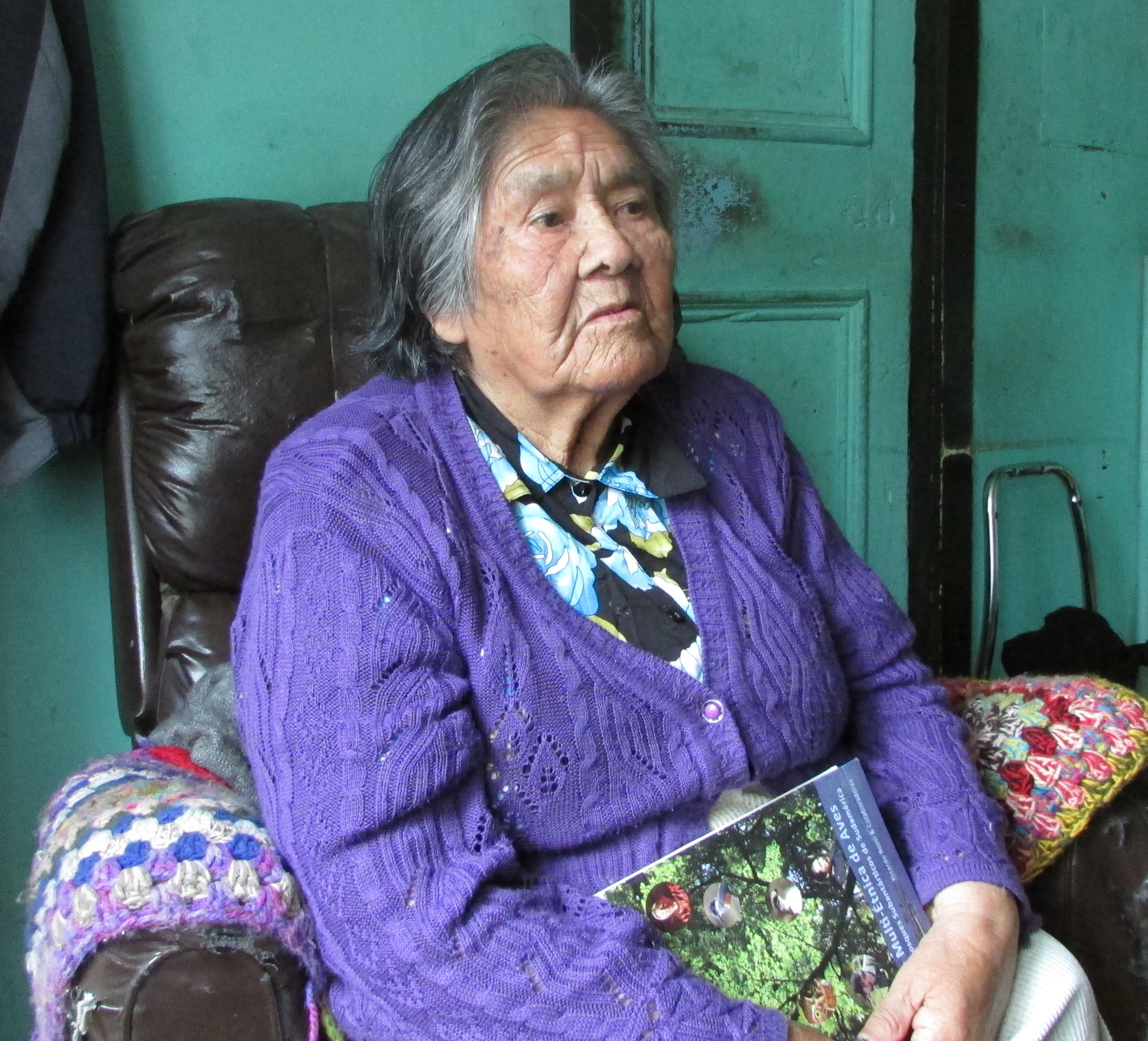
Cristina Calderón, the last living full-blooded Yahgan person and native speaker of the Yahgan language, died in 2022.

According to the Chilean census of 2002, there were 1,685 Yahgan in Chile.

In 2017, the Chilean census from the National Statistics Institute recorded a Yahgan population of 1,600.

== Notable Yahgan people ==
- Cristina Calderón, last native speaker of the Yahgan language
- Lidia González, daughter of Cristina Calderón and member of the Chilean Constitutional Convention
- Fuegia Basket, York Minster, and Jemmy Button, three Fuegians (Yahgan) who were taken to England by the captain and crew of HMS Beagle. The sailors coined these names for the girl and the men, respectively, during this first voyage.

== See also ==
- Martin Gusinde Anthropological Museum
- The Pearl Button, a 2015 documentary film
- Selkʼnam or Ona people of Patagonia
- Selkʼnam genocide
