= Sikorsky UH-60 Black Hawk =

Series of military utility transport helicopters

UH-60 Black Hawk
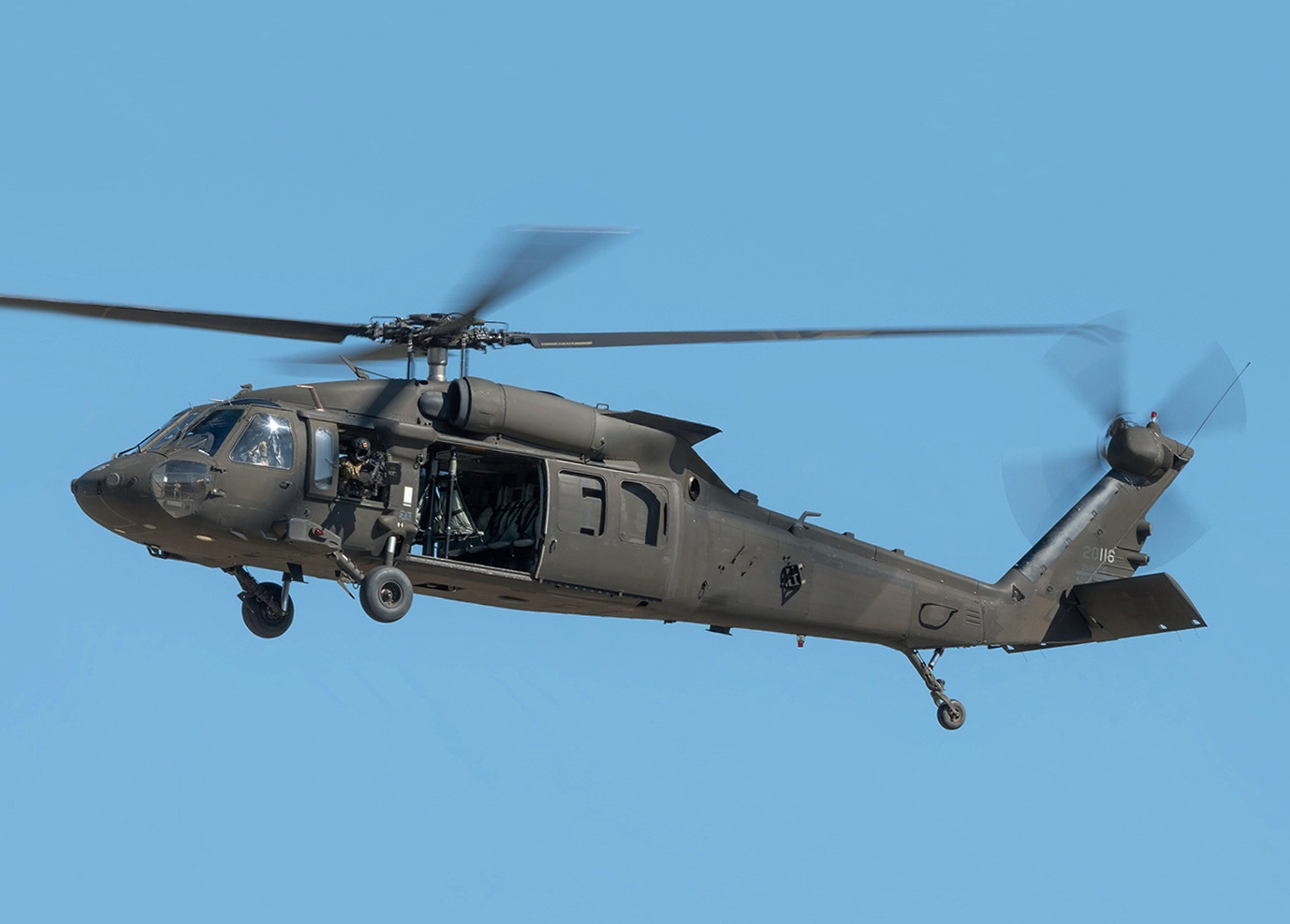
- A U.S. Army UH-60M Black Hawk landing, 2019

General information
- Type: Utility helicopter
- National origin: United States
- Manufacturer: Sikorsky Aircraft
- Status: In service
- Primary users: United States Army: Republic of Korea Armed Forces; Japan Self-Defense Forces; Colombian Armed Forces
- Number built: 5,000 by January 2023

History
- Manufactured: 1974–present
- Introduction date: 1979 (47 years ago)
- First flight: 17 October 1974
- Variants: SH-60 Seahawk; HH-60 Pave Hawk; MH-60 Jayhawk; S-70 (civilian); Mitsubishi H-60

The Sikorsky UH-60 Black Hawk is a four-blade, twin-engine, medium-lift military utility helicopter manufactured by Sikorsky Aircraft. Sikorsky submitted a design for the United States Army's Utility Tactical Transport Aircraft System (UTTAS) competition in 1972. The Army designated the prototype as the YUH-60A and selected the Black Hawk as the winner of the program in 1976, after a fly-off competition with the Boeing Vertol YUH-61.

Named after the Sauk leader Black Hawk, the UH-60A entered service with the U.S. Army in 1979, to replace the Bell UH-1 Iroquois as the Army's tactical transport helicopter. This was followed by the fielding of electronic warfare and special operations variants of the Black Hawk. Improved UH-60L and UH-60M utility variants have also been developed.

Major variants include the Navy's SH-60 Seahawk, the Air Force's HH-60 Pave Hawk, the Coast Guard's MH-60 Jayhawk and the civilian S-70. In addition to use by U.S. armed forces, the UH-60 family has been exported to several nations and produced under contract in Japan as the Mitsubishi H-60.

== Development ==
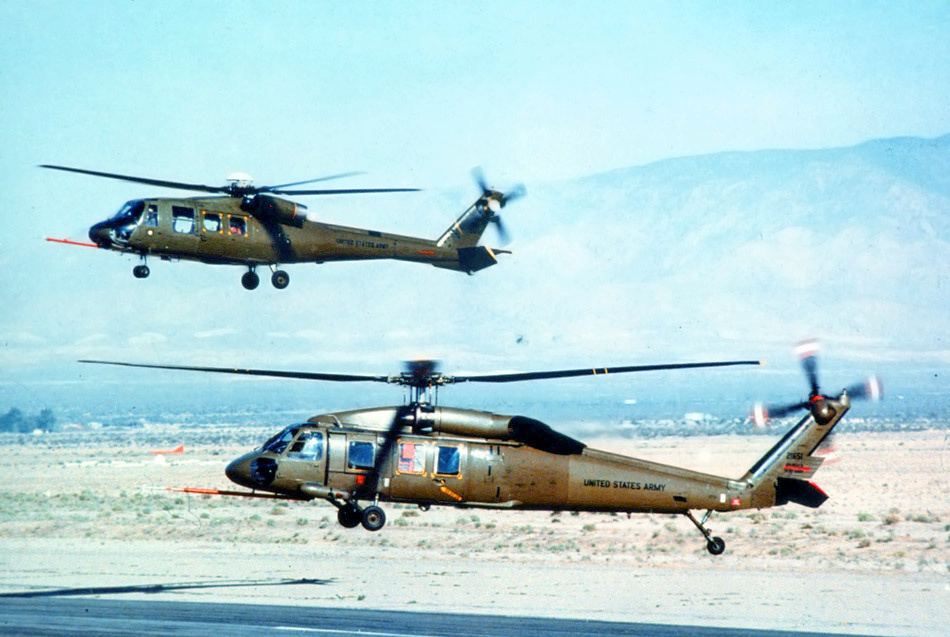
The flyoff competition in the mid-1970s between the Sikorsky YUH-60A (in front) and Boeing Vertol YUH-61A prototypes

=== Initial requirement ===
In the late 1960s, the United States Army began forming requirements for a helicopter to replace the UH-1 Iroquois, and designated the program as the Utility Tactical Transport Aircraft System (UTTAS). The Army also initiated the development of a new, common turbine engine for its helicopters that would become the General Electric T700. Based on experience in Vietnam, the Army required significant performance, survivability and reliability improvements from both UTTAS and the new powerplant. The Army released its UTTAS request for proposals (RFP) in January 1972. The RFP also included air transport requirements. Transport within the C-130 limited the UTTAS cabin height and length.

The UTTAS requirements for improved reliability, survivability and lower life-cycle costs resulted in features such as dual engines with improved hot and high altitude performance, and a modular design (reduced maintenance footprint); run-dry gearboxes; ballistically tolerant, redundant subsystems (hydraulic, electrical and flight controls); crashworthy crew (armored) and troop seats; dual-stage oleo main landing gear; ballistically tolerant, crashworthy main structure; quieter, more robust main and tail rotor systems; and a ballistically tolerant, crashworthy fuel system.

Four prototypes were constructed, with the first YUH-60A flying on 17 October 1974. Prior to the delivery of the prototypes to the US Army, a preliminary evaluation was conducted in November 1975 to ensure the aircraft could be operated safely during all testing. Three of the prototypes were delivered to the Army in March 1976, for evaluation against the rival Boeing-Vertol design, the YUH-61A, and one was kept by Sikorsky for internal research. The Army selected the UH-60 for production in December 1976. Deliveries of the UH-60A to the Army began in October 1978 and the helicopter entered service in June 1979.

=== Upgrades and variations ===
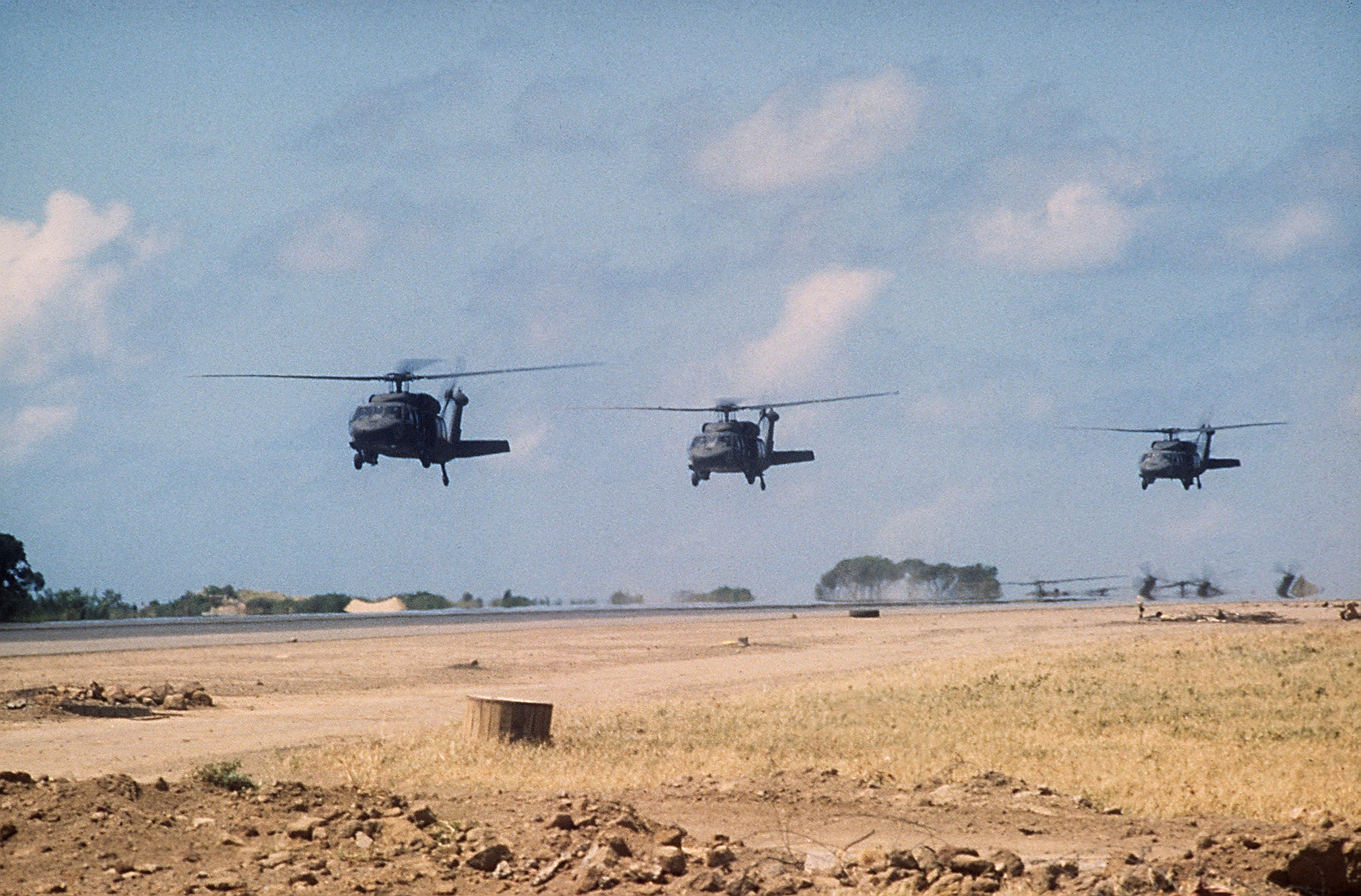
UH-60A Black Hawks over Port Salinas during the invasion of Grenada, 1983. The conflict saw the first use of the UH-60 in combat.

After entering service, the helicopter was modified for new missions and roles, including mine laying and medical evacuation. An EH-60 variant was developed to conduct electronic warfare and special operations aviation developed the MH-60 variant to support its missions.

Due to weight increases from the addition of mission equipment and other changes, the Army ordered the improved UH-60L in 1987. The new model incorporated all of the modifications made to the UH-60A fleet as standard design features. The UH-60L also featured more power and lifting capability with upgraded T700-GE-701C engines and an improved gearbox, both from the SH-60B Seahawk. Its external lift capacity increased by 1,000 lb (450 kg) up to 9,000 lb (4,100 kg). The UH-60L also incorporated the SH-60B's automatic flight control system (AFCS) for better flight control with more powerful engines. Production of the L-model began in 1989.

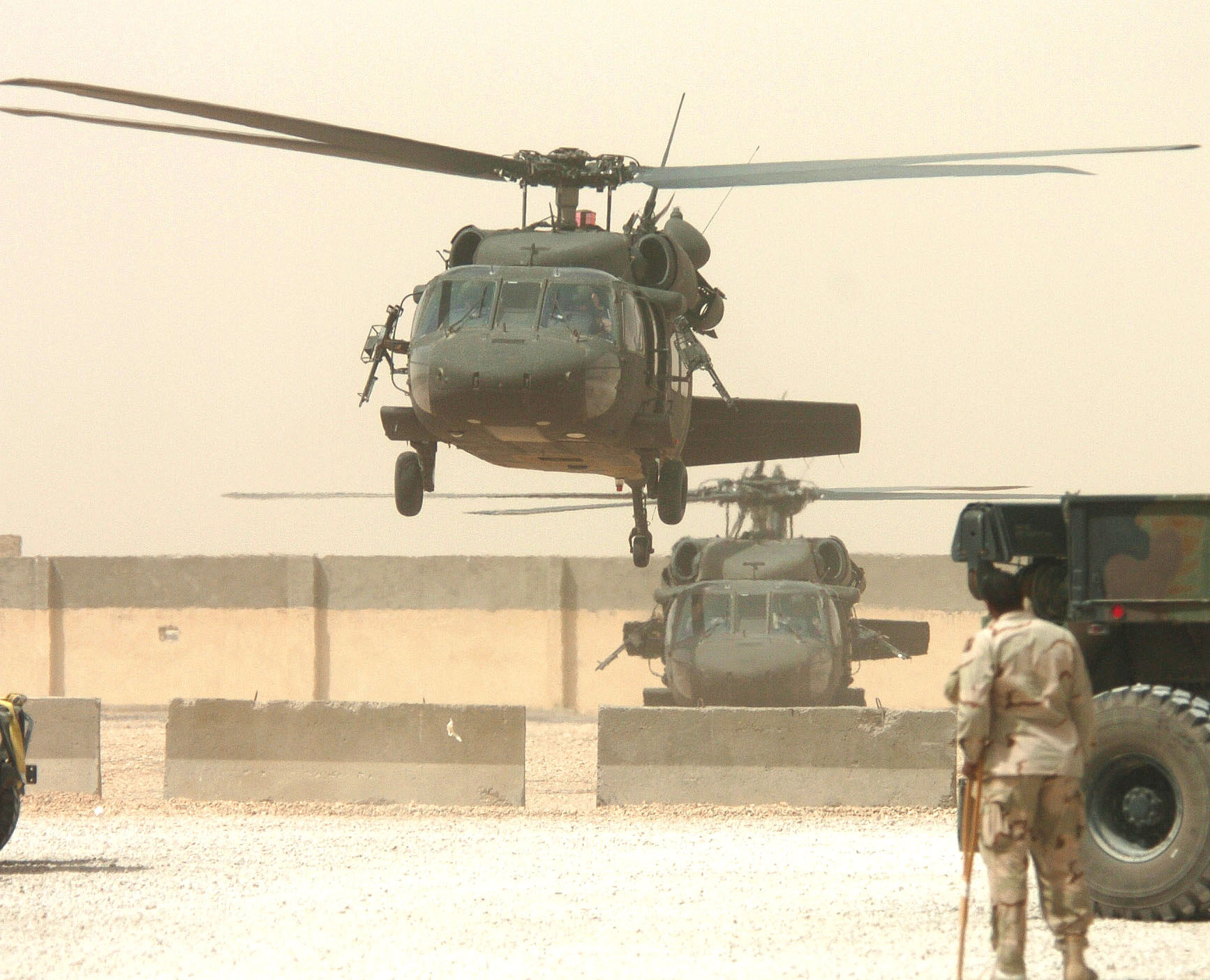
UH-60s equipped with M60 machine guns near An Najaf, Iraq, May 2005.

Development of the next improved variant, the UH-60M, was approved in 2001, to extend the service life of the UH-60 design into the 2020s. The UH-60M incorporates upgraded T700-GE-701D engines, improved rotor blades, and state-of-the-art electronic instrumentation, flight controls and aircraft navigation control. After the U.S. DoD approved low-rate initial production of the new variant, manufacturing began in 2006, with the first of 22 new UH-60Ms delivered in July 2006. After an initial operational evaluation, the Army approved full-rate production and a five-year contract for 1,227 helicopters in December 2007. By March 2009, 100 UH-60M helicopters had been delivered to the Army. In November 2014, the US military ordered 102 aircraft of various H-60 types, worth $1.3 billion.

Following their use in the operation to kill Osama bin Laden in May 2011, it emerged that the 160th SOAR used a secret variant of the UH-60 modified with low-observable technology which enabled it to evade Pakistani radar. Analysis of the tail section, the only remaining part of the aircraft which crashed during the operation, revealed extra blades on the tail rotor and other noise reduction measures, making the rotorcraft much quieter than conventional UH-60s. The aircraft appeared to include features like special high-tech materials, harsh angles, and flat surfaces found only in stealth jets. (Note: According to an Army Times article, "During the 1990s U.S. Special Operations Command worked with the Lockheed Martin Skunk Works division, which also designed the F-117, to refine the radar-evading technology and apply it to the 160th Special Operations Aviation Regiment's MH-60s," [a retired special operations aviator] said. USSOCOM awarded a contract to Boeing to modify several MH-60s to the low-observable design "in the '99 to 2000 timeframe," he also said.) Low observable variants of the Black Hawk have been studied as far back as the mid-1970s.

In September 2012, Sikorsky was awarded a Combat Tempered Platform Demonstration (CTPD) contract to further improve the Black Hawk's durability and survivability. The company is to develop new technologies such as a zero-vibration system, adaptive flight control laws, advanced fire management, a more durable main rotor, full-spectrum crashworthiness, and damage-tolerant airframe; then they are to transition them to the helicopter. Improvements to the Black Hawk are to continue until the Future Vertical Lift program is ready to replace it.

In December 2014, the 101st Airborne Division began testing new resupply equipment called the Enhanced Speed Bag System (ESBS). Soldiers in the field requiring quick resupply have depended on speed bags filled with items airdropped from a UH-60. However, all systems were ad hoc with bags not made to keep objects secure from impacts, so up to half of the airdropped items would be damaged upon hitting the ground. Started in 2011, the ESBS sought to standardize the airdrop resupply method and keep up to 90 percent of supplies intact. The system includes a hands-free reusable linear brake and expendable speed line and a multipurpose cargo bag. When the bag is deployed, the brake applies friction to the rope, slowing it down enough to keep the bag oriented down on the padded base, a honeycomb and foam kit inside to dissipate energy.

The ESBS better protects helicopter-dropped supplies, and allows the Black Hawk to fly higher above the ground, 100 ft (30 m) up from 10 feet, while travelling 20 knots (23 mph; 37 km/h), limiting exposure to ground fire. Each bag can weigh 125–200 lb (57–91 kg) and up to six can be deployed at once, dropping at 40–50 feet per second (12–15 m/s). Since supplies can be delivered more accurately and the system can be automatically released on its own, the ESBS can enable autonomous resupply from unmanned helicopters.

== Design ==
A UH-60L cockpit

The UH-60 features four-blade main and tail rotors, and is powered by two General Electric T700 turboshaft engines. The main rotor is fully articulated and has elastomeric bearings in the rotor head. The tail rotor is canted and features a rigid crossbeam. The helicopter has a long, low profile shape to meet the Army's requirement for transporting aboard a C-130 Hercules, with some disassembly. It can carry 11 troops with equipment, lift 2,600 pounds (1,200 kg) of cargo internally or 9,000 pounds (4,100 kg) of cargo (for UH-60L/M) externally by sling.

The Black Hawk helicopter series can perform a wide array of missions, including the tactical transport of troops, electronic warfare, and aeromedical evacuation. A VIP variant known as the VH-60N is used to transport important government officials (e.g., Congress, Executive departments) with the helicopter's call sign of "Marine One" when transporting the President of the United States. In air assault operations, it can move a squad of 11 combat troops or reposition a 105 mm M119 howitzer with 30 rounds ammunition and a four-man crew in a single lift. The Black Hawk is equipped with advanced avionics and electronics for increased survivability and capability, such as the Global Positioning System.

A view of interior and cockpit of a UH-60

The UH-60 can be equipped with stub wings at the top of the fuselage to carry fuel tanks or various armaments. The initial stub wing system is called External Stores Support System (ESSS). It has two pylons on each wing to carry two 230 US gal (870 L) and two 450 US gal (1,700 L) tanks in total. The four fuel tanks and associated lines and valves form the external extended range fuel system (ERFS). U.S. Army UH-60s have had their ESSS modified into the crashworthy external fuel system (CEFS) configuration, replacing the older tanks with up to four total 200 US gal (760 L) crashworthy tanks along with self-sealing fuel lines. The ESSS can also carry 10,000 lb (4,500 kg) of armament such as rockets, missiles and gun pods. The ESSS entered service in 1986. However, it was found that the four fuel tanks obstruct the field of fire for the door guns; thus, the external tank system (ETS), carrying two fuel tanks on the stub wings, was developed.

The unit cost of the H-60 models varies due to differences in specifications, equipment and quantities. For example, the unit cost of the Army's UH-60L Black Hawk is $5.9 million while the Air Force HH-60G Pave Hawk has a unit cost of $10.2 million.

== Operational history ==
The UH-60 Black Hawk is in service with 35 countries as of 2024.

=== Australia ===
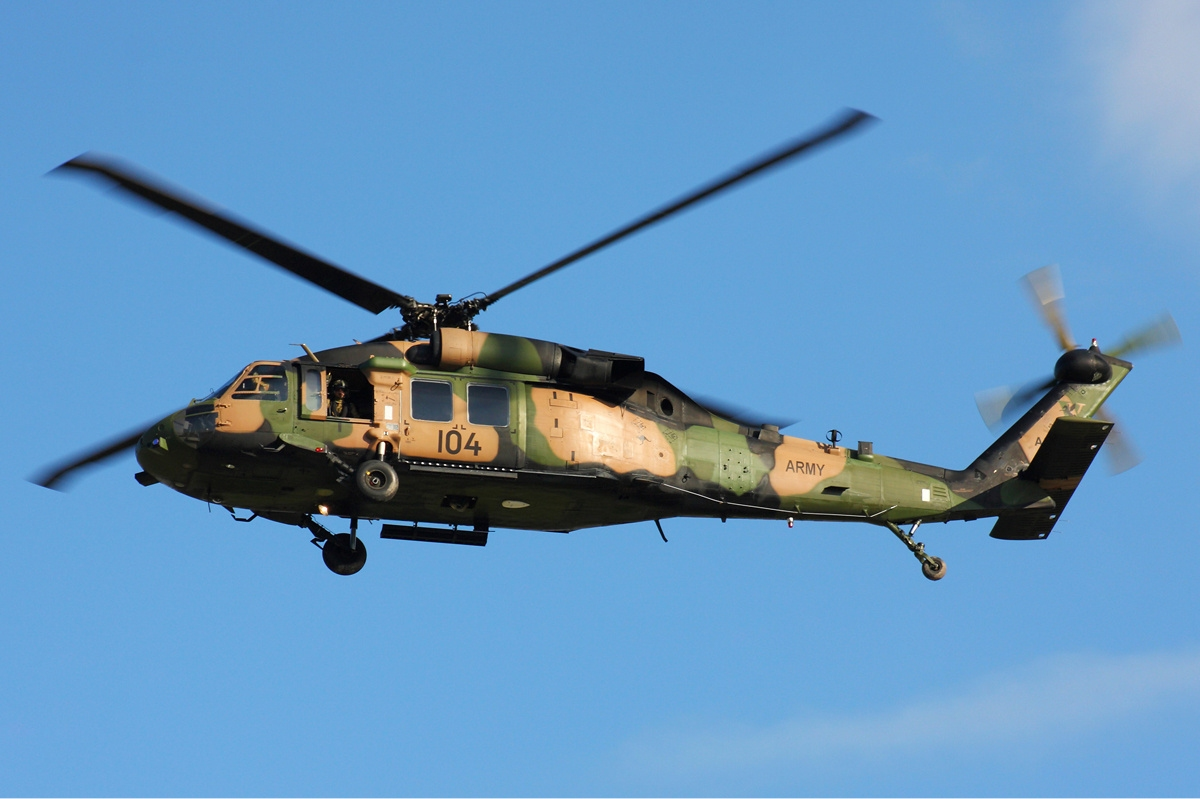
An Australian Army S-70A-9

Australia ordered fourteen S-70A-9 Black Hawks in 1986 and an additional twenty-five Black Hawks in 1987. The first US-produced Black Hawk was delivered in 1987 to the Royal Australian Air Force (RAAF). de Havilland Australia produced thirty-eight Black Hawks under licence from Sikorsky in Australia delivering the first in 1988 and the last in 1991. In 1989, the RAAF's fleet of Black Hawks was transferred to the Australian Army. The Black Hawks saw operational service in Cambodia, Papua New Guinea, Indonesia, East Timor and Pakistan.

In April 2009, the then-defence chief Air Chief Marshal Angus Houston, told the government not to deploy Black Hawks to Afghanistan as at the time they "lacked armour and self-defence systems", and despite an upgrade to address this being underway, it was more practical to use allies' helicopters. In 2004, the government selected the Multi-Role Helicopter (MRH-90) Taipan, a variant of the NHIndustries NH90, to replace the Black Hawk even though the Department of Defence had recommended the S‐70M Black Hawk.

In January 2014, the Army began to retire the fleet of 34 Black Hawks from service (five had been lost in accidents) and had planned for this to be completed by June 2018. The Chief of Army delayed the retirement of 20 Black Hawks until 2021 to enable the Army to develop a special operations role capable MRH-90. On 10 December 2021, the S-70A-9 Black Hawks were retired from service. On the same day, amid issues with the performance of the MRH-90s the government announced that they would be replaced by UH-60M Black Hawks. In January 2023, the Army announced the acquisition of 40 UH-60Ms with deliveries commencing in 2023.

=== Brazil ===
Brazil received four UH-60L helicopters in 1997, for the Brazilian Army peacekeeping forces. It received six UH-60Ls configured for special forces, and search and rescue uses in 2008. It ordered ten more UH-60Ls in 2009; deliveries began in March 2011. In July 2024, the MoD authorized the purchase of 12 additional UH-60Ms, in a US$451 million plan.

=== Canada ===
In January 2025, the Royal Canadian Mounted Police (RCMP) chartered 2 UH-60A Black Hawks from an Ottawa-based company for a cost of 5.3 million CA$ (3.7 million US$) The helicopters were acquired for surveillance and rapid response along the Canada-US border, as well as to support the RCMP Emergency Response Team. The move has been criticized by some as unnecessary and "border security theatre."

In June 2026, the RCMP grounded a newly contracted refurbished UH-60 Black Hawk after regulatory concerns from Transport Canada who had not yet certified the aircraft for use. Transport Canada had previously granted exemptions to four other Black Hawk helicopters but stopped issuing these exemptions after industry pressure.

Further plans for acquiring the UH-60M were halted due to the trade war between Canada and the US.

=== China ===
In December 1983, examples of the Aerospatiale AS-332 Super Puma, Bell 214ST SuperTransport and Sikorsky S-70A-5 (N3124B) were airlifted to Lhasa for testing. These demonstrations included take-offs and landings at altitudes to 17,000 feet (5,200 m) and en route operations to 24,000 feet (7,300 m). At the end of this testing, the People's Liberation Army purchased 24 S-70C-2s, equipped with more powerful GE T700-701A engines for improved high-altitude performance. While designated as civil variants of the S-70 for export purposes, they are operated by the People's Liberation Army Aviation units.

=== Colombia ===
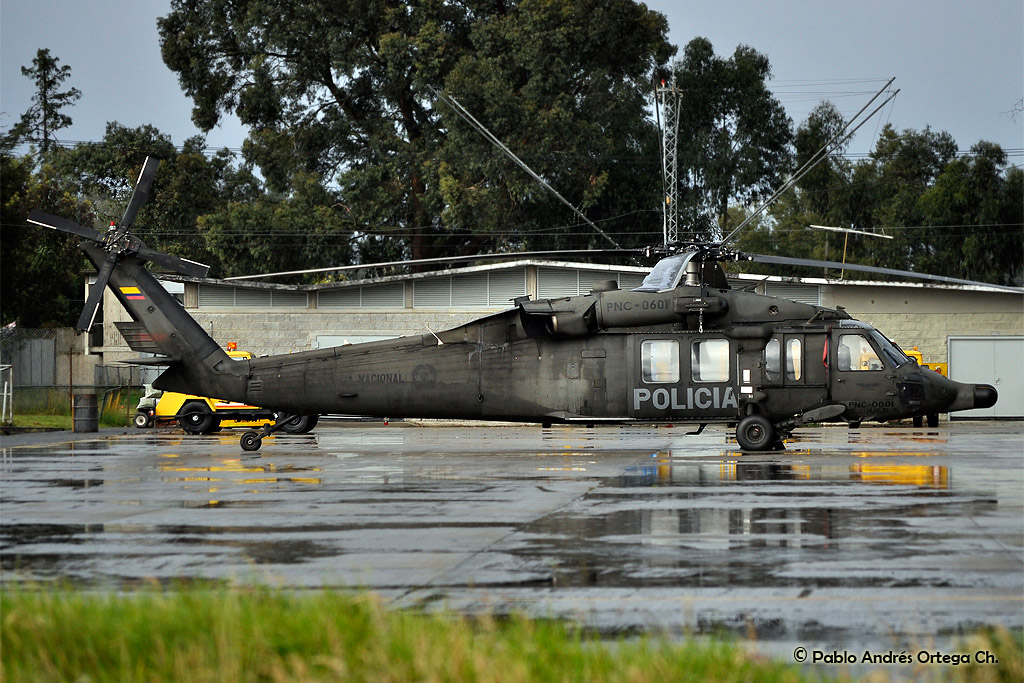
A Colombian National Police UH-60 Black Hawk in November 2010

Colombia first received UH-60s from the U.S. in 1987. The Colombian National Police, Colombian Aerospace Force, and Colombian Army use UH-60s to transport troops and supplies to places which are difficult to access by land for counter-insurgency (COIN) operations against drug and guerrilla organizations, for search and rescue, and for medical evacuation. Colombia also operates a militarized gunship variant of the UH-60, with stub wings, locally known as Arpía (English: Harpy).

The Colombian Army became the first worldwide operator of the S-70i with Terrain Awareness and Warning Capability (HTAWS) after taking delivery of the first two units on 13 August 2013.

=== Israel ===
The Israeli Air Force (IAF) received 10 surplus UH-60A Black Hawks from the U.S. in August 1994. Named Yanshuf (English: Owl) by the IAF, the UH-60A began replacing Bell 212 utility helicopters. The IAF first used the UH-60s in combat during 1996 in southern Lebanon in Operation Grapes of Wrath against Hezbollah.

=== Mexico ===
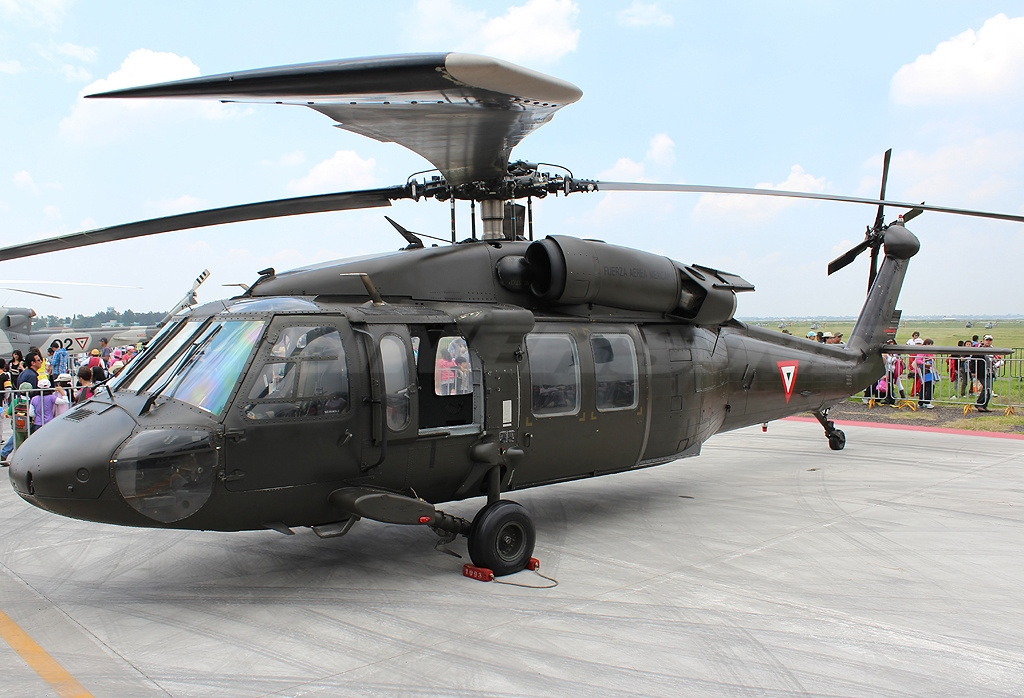
Mexican Air Force S-70A-24A

The Mexican Air Force ordered its first two UH-60Ls in 1991 to transport special forces units, and another four in 1994. In July and August 2009, the Federal Police used UH-60s in attacks on drug traffickers. In August 2011, the Mexican Navy received three upgraded and navalized UH-60M. On 21 April 2014, the U.S. State Department approved the sale of 18 UH-60Ms to Mexico pending approval from Congress. In September 2014, Sikorsky received a $203.6 million (~$272 million in 2025) firm-fixed-price contract modification for the 18 UH-60s designated for the Mexican Air Force.

=== Philippines ===
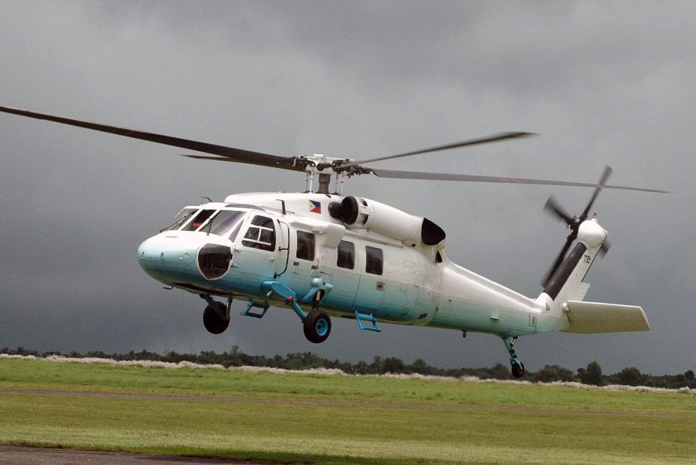
A Philippine S-70-A5 VIP of the Presidential Airlift Wing

2 S-70-A5 VIP helicopters purchased 1983 and was delivered in 1984, this Blackhawk served the 250th PAW for more than 3 decades as a Presidential VVIP transport helicopter. Only 1 remains in service with the 505th Search and Rescue Group.

In March 2019, the Philippines' Department of National Defense (DND) signed a contract worth US$241.4 million (~$299 million in 2025) with Lockheed Martin's Polish subsidiary PZL Mielec for 16 Sikorsky S-70i Black Hawks to the PAF. On 10 December 2020, the PAF commissioned their first batch of six S-70i Blackhawks, with the remaining 10 to be delivered in 2021. In June 2021, the air service received a second batch of five helicopters. In November 2021, the third batch of five arrived.

On 22 February 2022, DND and PZL Mielec formally signed the US$624 million contract for 32 additional S-70i Black Hawks, totaling to around 48 units ordered. On 26 August 2026, it has delivered 7 last Black Hawks to the Philippines, completes the 32-helicopter acquisition, making the Philippine Air Force the largest user of S-70i Blackhawk Helicopters globally.

=== Poland ===
In January 2019, Poland ordered four S-70i Black Hawks with four delivered to the Polish Special Forces in December of that same year. Another four S-70i helicopters are on order with two scheduled for delivery in 2023 and two in 2024. In July 2023, Poland launched a procurement tender for S-70i Black Hawks with a goal to order approximately 32 helicopters.

=== Slovakia ===
In February 2015, the U.S. State Department approved a possible Foreign Military Sale of nine UH-60Ms with associated equipment and support to Slovakia and sent it to Congress for its approval. In April 2015, Slovakia's government approved the procurement of nine UH-60Ms along with training and support. In September 2015, Slovakia ordered four UH-60Ms. The first two UH-60Ms were delivered in June 2017; the Slovak Air Force had received all nine UH-60Ms by January 2020. These are to replace its old Soviet Mil Mi-17s. In 2020, the Slovak minister of defense announced Slovakia's interest in buying two more UH-60Ms.

Slovak Training Academy (European Air Services / Heli Company) from Košice, a private company, operates some older UH-60As & Bs for pilot training, aerial fire fighting and sky crane operations.

=== Sweden ===
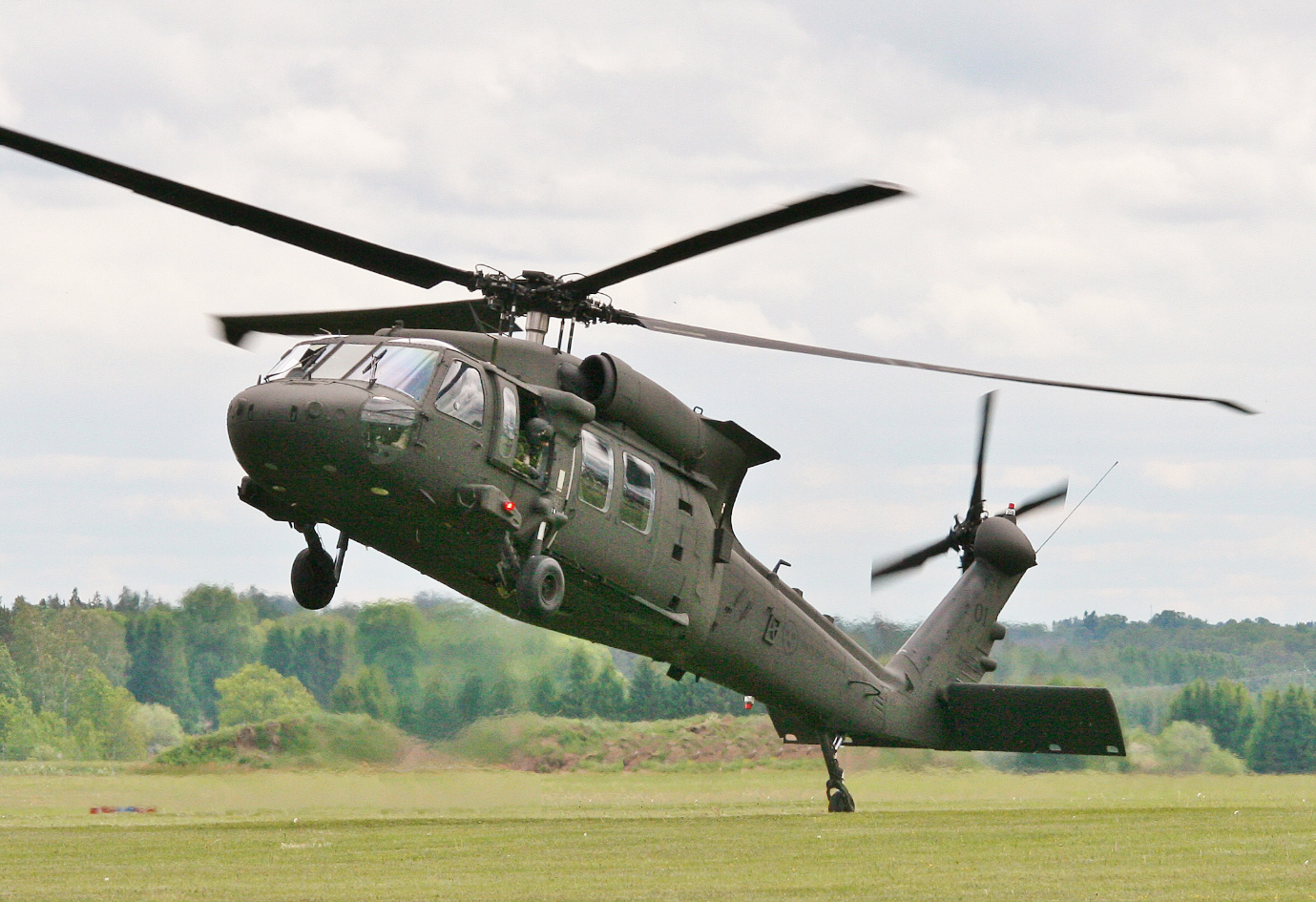
A Swedish UH-60 landing during a demonstration

Sweden requested 15 UH-60M helicopters by Foreign Military Sale in September 2010. The UH-60Ms were ordered in May 2011, and deliveries began in January 2012. In March 2013, Swedish ISAF forces began using Black Hawks in Afghanistan for MEDEVAC purposes. The UH-60Ms have been fully operational since 2017. Sweden designates it the Helicopter 16 (Hkp 16). In June 2024, Sweden ordered 12 more UH-60Ms from the US.

=== South Korea ===
The Republic of Korea Armed Forces is also an operator and has produced about 130 aircraft under license from Korean Air since the 1990s and domestically producing and introducing the UH-60 simulator. However, the cockpit is analog compared to the digital one in the United States, but since this business started after the 1988 Olympics, there was no such thing as a glass cockpit with an LCD monitor. Currently, the majority of South Korea's UH-60s belong to the Army, including 36 units operated by the Special Operations Aviation Corps.

=== Taiwan ===
Taiwan (Republic of China) operated S-70C-1/1A after the Republic of China Air Force received ten S-70C-1A and four S-70C-1 Bluehawk helicopters in June 1986 for Search and Rescue. Four more S-70C-6s were received in April 1998. The ROC Navy received the first of ten S-70C(M)-1s in July 1990. 11 S-70C(M)-2s were received beginning April 2000. In January 2010, the US announced approval for a Foreign Military Sale of 60 UH-60Ms to Taiwan with 30 designated for the Army, 15 for the National Airborne Service Corps (including the one that crashed off Orchid Island in 2018) and 15 for the Air Force Rescue Group (including the one that crashed 2 January 2020).

=== Turkey ===
Turkey has operated the UH-60 during NATO deployments to Afghanistan and the Balkans. The UH-60 has also been used in counter-terror/internal security operations.

The Black Hawk competed against the AgustaWestland AW149 in the Turkish General Use Helicopter Tender, to order up to 115 helicopters and produce many of them indigenously, with Turkish Aerospace Industries responsible for final integration and assembly. On 21 April 2011, Turkey announced the selection of Sikorsky's T-70.

In the course of the coup d'état attempt in Turkey on 15 July 2016, eight Turkish military personnel of various ranks landed in Greece's northeastern city of Alexandroupolis on board a Black Hawk helicopter and claimed political asylum in Greece. The helicopter was returned to Turkey shortly thereafter.

=== Ukraine ===
In February 2023, Ukraine's Main Directorate of Intelligence (HUR) published a video showing them operating at least two UH-60s painted in Ukrainian colors. The helicopters appeared to have minimal modifications, namely the addition of two M240 7.62 mm machine guns for defensive purposes. It was confirmed that at least one of these was purchased by a third party, Ace Aeronautics, following a Czech crowdfunding effort that raised US$6 million. On 17 March 2024, Russia claimed to have shot down a UH-60 during the March 2024 western Russia incursion, claiming it was a "troop transport" carrying 20 troops into combat. However, it was revealed to be a Mil Mi-8 instead.

=== United States ===
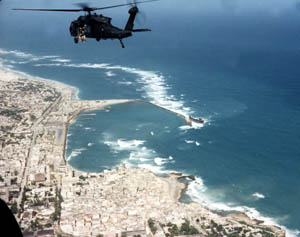
A U.S. Army MH-60L during the Battle of Mogadishu, 1993

The UH-60 entered service with the U.S. Army's 101st Combat Aviation Brigade of the 101st Airborne Division in June 1979. The U.S. military first used the UH-60 in combat during the invasion of Grenada in 1983, and again in the invasion of Panama in 1989. During the Gulf War in 1991, the UH-60 participated in the largest air assault mission in U.S. Army history with over 300 helicopters involved. Two UH-60s (89-26214 and 78–23015) were shot down, both on 27 February 1991, while performing Combat Search and Rescue of other downed aircrews, an F-16C pilot and the crew of a MEDEVAC UH-1H that were shot down earlier that day.

In 1993, Black Hawks featured prominently in the Battle of Mogadishu in Somalia during which two Black Hawk helicopters were shot down. Black Hawks also saw action in the Balkans and Haiti in the 1990s. U.S. Army UH-60s and other helicopters conducted many air assaults and other support missions during the 2003 invasion of Iraq. The UH-60 has continued to serve in operations in Afghanistan and Iraq.

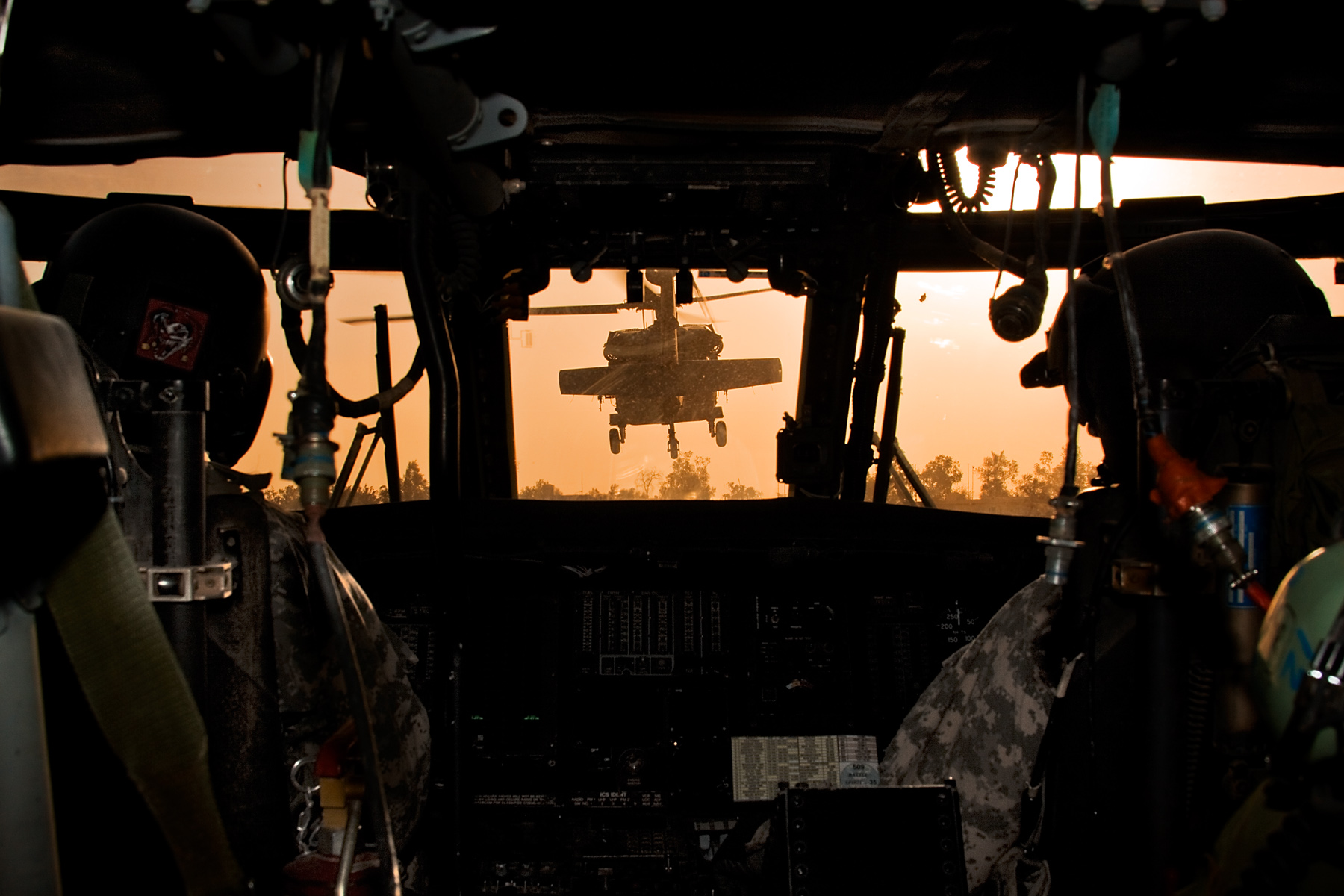
Cockpit view Iraq, 2009

Customs and Border Protection Office of Air and Marine (OAM) uses the UH-60 in its operations specifically along the southwest border. The Black Hawk has been used by OAM to interdict illegal entry into the U.S. Additionally, OAM regularly uses the UH-60 in search and rescue operations. Highly modified H-60s were employed during the U.S. Special Operations mission that resulted in the death of Osama bin Laden during Operation Neptune Spear on 2 May 2011. One such MH-60 helicopter crash-landed during the operation and was destroyed by the team before it departed in the other MH-60 and a backup MH-47 Chinook with bin Laden's remains. Two MH-47s were used for the mission to refuel the two MH-60s and as backups. News media reported that the Pakistani government granted the Chinese military access to the wreckage of the crashed 'stealth' UH-60 variant in Abbottabad; Pakistan and China denied the reports, and the U.S. government did not confirm Chinese access.

Black Hawk Helicopter in Kandahar Airbase

The U.S. Army has signaled its intent to eventually replace the UH-60, launching the Future Long-Range Assault Aircraft (FLRAA) program in 2019, with a new helicopter planned to enter service by 2030. Bell and a joint Sikorsky-Boeing team both entered competing designs. In December 2022, it was announced that the winning design was Bell's tilt-rotor V-280 Valor, with the US Army awarding an initial contract to develop a prototype by 2025. This award does not guarantee the eventual adoption of the V-280, which would require further contracts. As an Army program, the outcome of FLRAA will not necessarily affect UH-60 variants in service with other branches of the U.S. military.

=== Additional users ===
The United Arab Emirates requested 14 UH-60M helicopters and associated equipment in September 2008, through Foreign Military Sale. It had received 20 UH-60Ls by November 2010. Bahrain ordered nine UH-60Ms in 2007.

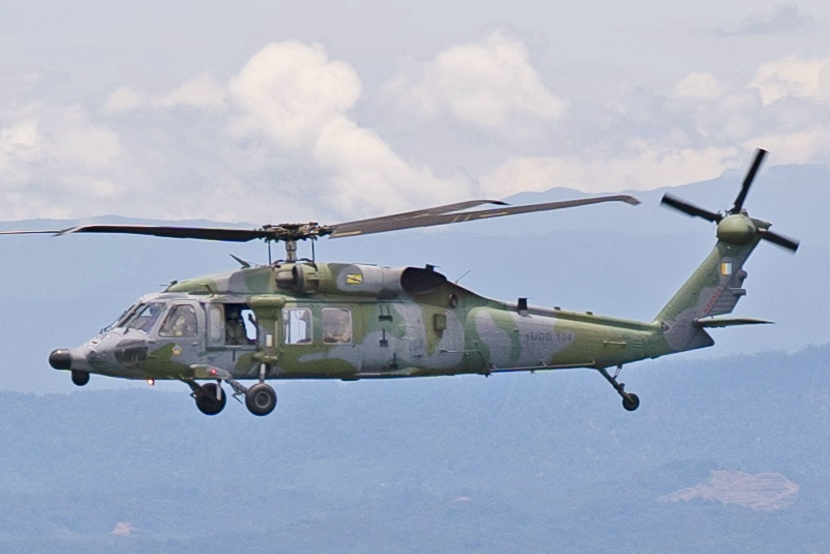
Sikorsky S-70i of the Royal Brunei Air Force (RBAirF / TUDB).

In December 2011, the Royal Brunei Air Force (RBAirF / TUDB) ordered twelve S-70i helicopters, which are similar to the UH-60M; four aircraft had been received by December 2013. In June 2012, the U.S. Defense Security Cooperation Agency notified Congress that Qatar requested the purchase of twelve UH-60Ms, engines, and associated equipment. The Royal Brunei Air Force had earlier bought four UH-60, but these were later sold to Malaysia.

In May 2014, Croatian Defence Minister Ante Kotromanović announced the beginning of negotiations for the purchase of 15 used Black Hawks. In October 2018, the US via Ambassador Robert Kohorst announced donation of two UH-60M helicopters with associated equipment and crew training to Croatia's Ministry of Defence, to be delivered in 2020. In October 2019, the US State Dept approved the sale of two new UH-60M Black Hawks. In February 2022, the first two helicopters were delivered to Croatia. In January 2024, the State Department approved a possible Foreign Military Sale to Croatia for 8 UH-60M helicopters and related equipment and services for an estimated cost of $500 million. The U.S. government has provided $139.4 million in financial assistance for 51 percent of the funding, as a compensation for the Croatian donation of 14 Mi-8 helicopters to Ukraine. The remaining sum is be provided by Croatia's Ministry of Defence in the three-year budget period from 2025 to 2027. The Letter of Offer and Acceptance was signed in March 2024. Delivery of all 8 Black Hawks is expected in 2028.

Tunisia requested 12 armed UH-60M helicopters in July 2014 through Foreign Military Sale. In August 2014, the U.S. ambassador stated that the U.S. "will soon make available" the UH-60Ms to Tunisia. The sale of 8 helicopters was approved and helicopters were delivered 2017 and 2018.

In January 2015, the Malaysian Defence Minister Hishammuddin Hussein confirmed that Royal Malaysian Air Force (RMAF) is receiving S-70A Black Hawks from the Brunei government. These helicopters, believed to be four in total, were expected to be transferred to Malaysia by September with M134D miniguns added. The four Black Hawks were delivered to Royal Brunei Air Force (RBAirF / TUDB) in 1999.

In 2018, Latvia requested to buy four UH-60M Black Hawks with associated equipment for an estimated cost of $200 million (~$252 million in 2025). In August 2018, the State Department approved the possible Foreign Military Sale. The Defense Security Cooperation Agency delivered the required certification notifying Congress of the possible sale. In November 2018, Latvia ordered four UH-60Ms, and received the first two in December 2022.

In 2019, Lithuania announced plans to buy six UH-60M helicopters before ordering four UH-60Ms in 2020. In July 2020, the US State Department approved the possible Foreign Military Sale of six UH-60Ms and associated equipment to Lithuania for $380 million. In November 2020, Lithuania signed a contract worth $213 million for four UH-60Ms with an option to purchase two more aircraft. Preparations are almost complete including facilities and training, with deliveries expected in late 2024.

In 2019, Poland ordered four S-70i helicopters for its special forces. As of 2023 there is negotiations to purchase additional S-70i helicopters.

In August 2023, the Portuguese Air Force shared a photo on Twitter of the first flight of one of the six UH-60s purchased from Arista Aviation Services. The Portuguese armed forces conducted its first operation flight of its UH-60 in December 2023.

In December 2023, the Hellenic Army selected the UH-60Ms for a possible order of 35 aircraft and associated equipment for an estimated cost of $1.95 billion pending the deal clears Congress. This order was approved by US and Greek governments, and a contract for 35 helicopters agreed by April 2024. In Greek service it will replace aged Bell UH-1H and Agusta-Bell AB205. Greece already operates S-70B and MH-60R helicopters.

=== Future and potential users ===
In February 2013, the Indonesian Army announced its interest in buying UH-60 Black Hawks to modernize its weaponry. The army wants them for combating terrorism, transnational crime, and insurgency to secure the archipelago. In August 2023, Indonesian Aerospace and Lockheed Martin signed an agreement for the procurement of 24 UH-60/S-70 Black Hawks. In February 2024, it was announced during Singapore Airshow 2024 that Ministry of Defense of the Republic of Indonesia downsized the Black Hawks program to 22 aircraft.

In 2022, the Royal Air Force and British Army expects to select a helicopter for the New Medium Helicopter program to replace several existing helicopters. Sikorsky has indicated it expects its S-70M to meet the requirement to participate in this procurement selection program.

In December 2025, the Directorate General of Defence Purchase floated a tender for UH-60L for the Bangladesh Army.

== Variants ==
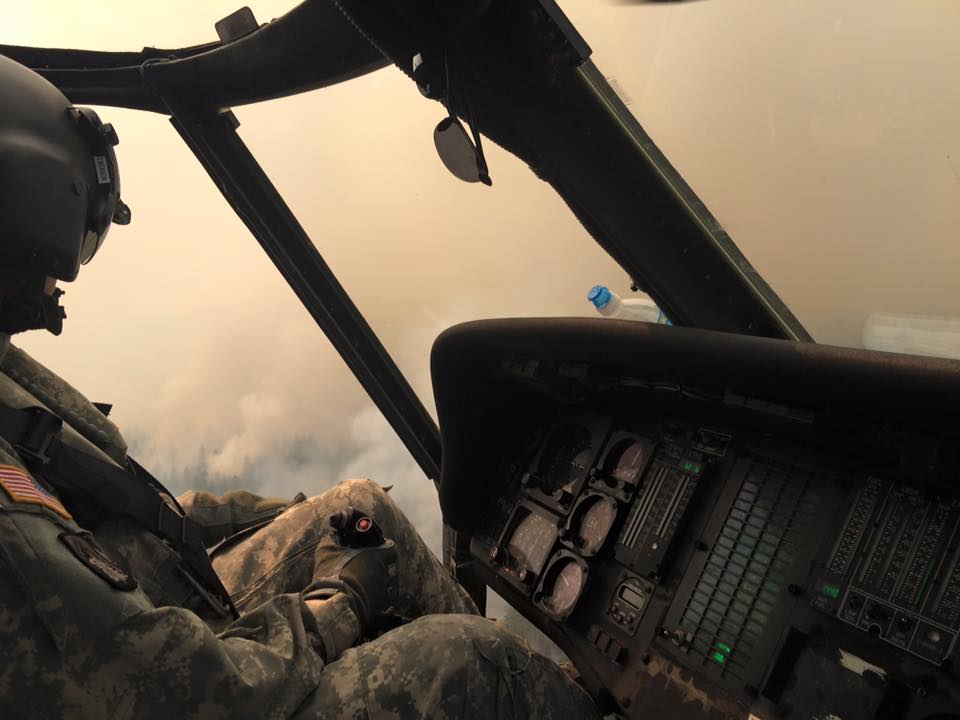
U.S. National Guard UH-60 supporting operations against the Cougar Creek wildfire, 2015

The UH-60 comes in many variants and modifications. The U.S. Army variants can be fitted with stub wings to carry additional fuel tanks or weapons. Variants may have different capabilities and equipment to fulfill different roles.

=== Utility variants ===
- YUH-60A: Initial test and evaluation variant for U.S. Army. First flight on 17 October 1974. Three were built.
- UH-60A Black Hawk: Original U.S. Army variant, carrying a crew of four and up to 11 equipped troops. Equipped with T700-GE-700 engines. Produced 1977–1989. U.S. Army is equipping UH-60As with more powerful T700-GE-701D engines and also upgrading A-models to UH-60L standards.
- UH-60C Black Hawk: Modified variant for command and control (C2) missions.
- CH-60E: Proposed troop transport variant for the U.S. Marine Corps.

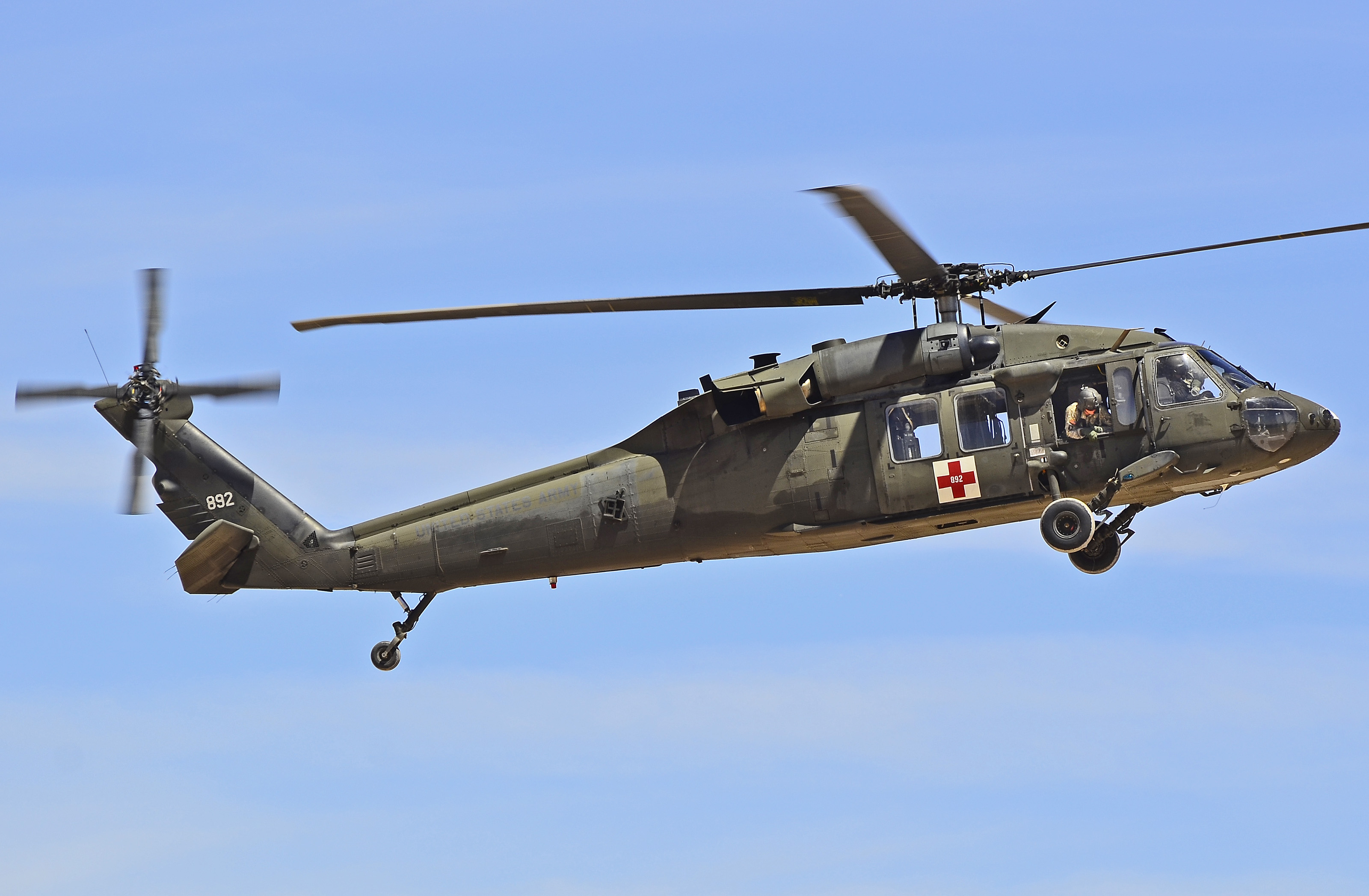
US Army UH-60L Black Hawk

- UH-60L Black Hawk: UH-60A with upgraded T700-GE-701C engines, improved durability gearbox, and updated flight control system. Produced 1989–2007. UH-60Ls are also being equipped with the GE T700-GE-701D engine. The U.S. Army Corpus Christi Army Depot is upgrading UH-60A helicopters to the UH-60L configuration. In July 2018, Sierra Nevada Corporation proposed upgrading some converted UH-60L helicopters for the U.S. Air Force's UH-1N replacement program.
- UH-60M Black Hawk: Improved design wide chord rotor blades, T700-GE-701D engines (max 2,000 shp or 1,500 kW each), improved durability gearbox, Integrated Vehicle Health Management System (IVHMS) computer, and new glass cockpit. Production began in 2006. Planned to replace older U.S. Army UH-60s.
- UH-60M Upgrade Black Hawk: UH-60M with fly-by-wire system and Common Avionics Architecture System (CAAS) cockpit suite. Flight testing began in August 2008.
- UH-60V Black Hawk: Upgraded variant of the UH-60L with the electronic displays (glass cockpit) of the UH-60M. Upgrades performed by Northrop Grumman featuring a centralized processor with a partitioned, modular operational flight program enabling capabilities to be added as software-only modifications. In February 2024, the Army announced it would cancel further plans to upgrade remaining UH-60L's to the UH-60V standard, in favor of acquiring more new production UH-60Ms to shore up the industrial base for UH-60 production.

=== Special purpose ===
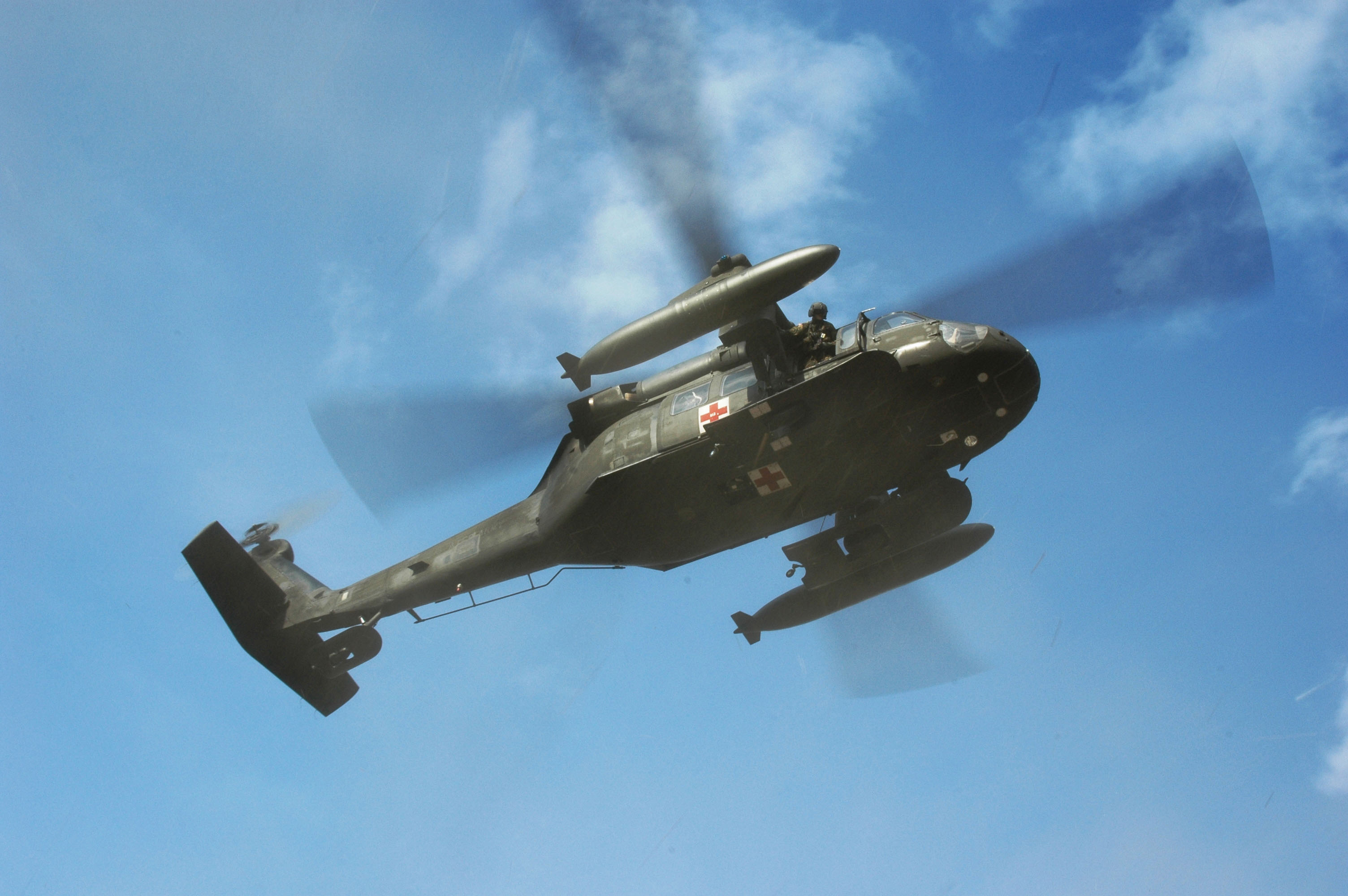
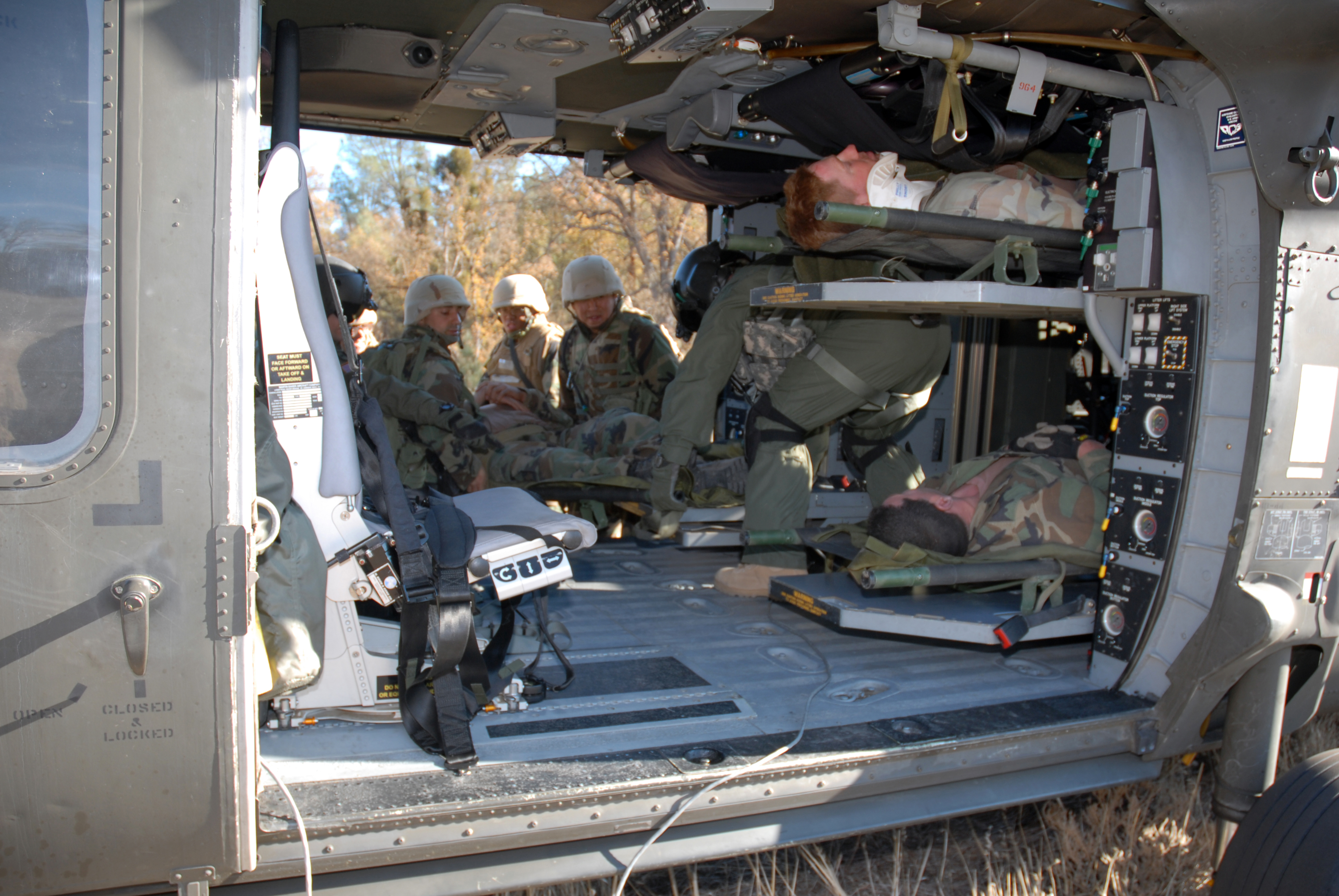
An example of a medical evacuation variant of the U/HH-60 Black Hawk
- EH-60A Black Hawk: UH-60A with modified electrical system and stations for two electronic systems mission operators. All examples of type have been converted back to standard UH-60A configuration.
- YEH-60B Black Hawk: UH-60A modified for special radar and avionics installations, prototype for stand-off target acquisition system.
- EH-60C Black Hawk: UH-60A modified with special electronics equipment and external antenna. (All examples of type have been taken back to standard UH-60A configuration.)
- EUH-60L (no official name assigned): UH-60L modified with additional mission electronic equipment for Army Airborne C2.
- EH-60L Black Hawk: EH-60A with major mission equipment upgrade.
- UH-60Q Black Hawk: UH-60A modified for medical evacuation. The UH-60Q is named "Dust off", echoing the callsign used for U.S. Army Aviation casualty evacuation flying since Vietnam. There has also been a backronym created, DUSTOFF for "dedicated unhesitating service to our fighting forces".
- HH-60L (no official name assigned): UH-60L extensively modified with medical mission equipment. Components include an external rescue hoist, integrated patient configuration system, environmental control system, onboard oxygen system (OBOGS), and crash-worthy ambulatory seats.
- HH-60M Black Hawk: UH-60M with medical mission equipment (medevac variant) for U.S. Army.
- HH-60U: USAF UH-60M variant modified with an electro-optical sensor and rescue hoist. Three in use by Air Force pilots and special mission aviators since 2011. Has 85% commonality with the HH-60W.
- HH-60W Jolly Green II: Modified variant of the UH-60M for the U.S. Air Force as a Combat Rescue Helicopter to replace HH-60G Pave Hawks with greater fuel capacity and more internal cabin space, dubbed the "60-Whiskey". Deliveries to the USAF of the HH-60W began in 2020.The 41st Rescue Squadron received the first two HH-60W helicopters on 5 November 2020.
- MH-60A Black Hawk: 30 UH-60As modified with additional avionics, night vision capable cockpit, FLIR, M134 door guns, internal auxiliary fuel tanks and other Special Operations mission equipment in early 1980s for U.S. Army. Equipped with T700-GE-701 engines. Variant was used by the 160th Special Operations Aviation Regiment. The MH-60As were replaced by MH-60Ls beginning in the early 1990s and passed to Army Aviation units in the Army National Guard.
- MH-60L Black Hawk: Special operations modification, used by the U.S. Army's 160th Special Operations Aviation Regiment ("Night Stalkers"), based on the UH-60L with T700-701C engines. It was developed as an interim variant in the late 1980s pending the fielding of the MH-60K specifically designed for the 160th SOAR(A). Equipped with many of the systems used on MH-60K, including FLIR, color weather map, auxiliary fuel system, and laser rangefinder/designator. A total of 37 MH-60Ls were built and some 10 had received an in-flight refueling probe by 2003.
- MH-60L DAP: The Direct Action Penetrator (DAP) is a special operations modification of the baseline MH-60L, operated by the U.S. Army's 160th Special Operations Aviation Regiment. The DAP is configured as a gunship, with no troop-carrying capacity. The DAP is equipped with ESSS or ETS stub wings, each capable of carrying configurations of the M230 Chain Gun 30 mm automatic cannon, 19-shot Hydra 70 rocket pod, AGM-114 Hellfire missiles, AIM-92 Stinger air-to-air missiles, GAU-19 gun pods, and M134 minigun pods, M134D miniguns are used as door guns.

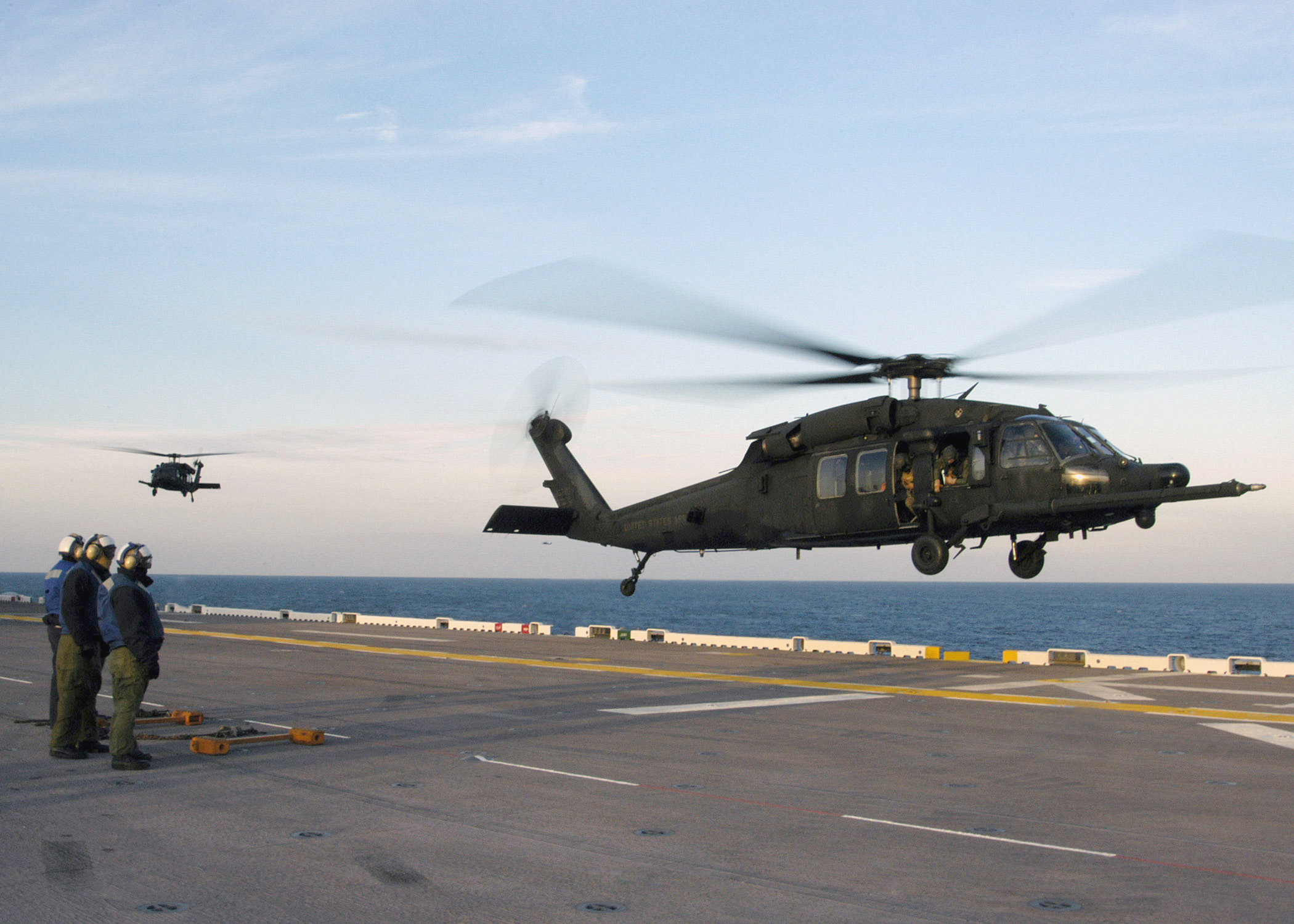
UH-60Ms from the 160th SOAR(A) landing aboard the USS Bataan

- MH-60K Black Hawk: Special operations modification first ordered in 1988 for use by the U.S. Army's 160th Special Operations Aviation Regiment ("Night Stalkers"). Equipped with the in-flight refueling probe, and T700-GE-701C engines. More advanced than the MH-60L, the K-model also includes an integrated avionics system (glass cockpit), AN/APQ-174B terrain-following radar, color weather map, improved weapons capability, and various defensive systems. The MH-60K can be configured either as an assault helicopter carrying troops or as a DAP gunship.

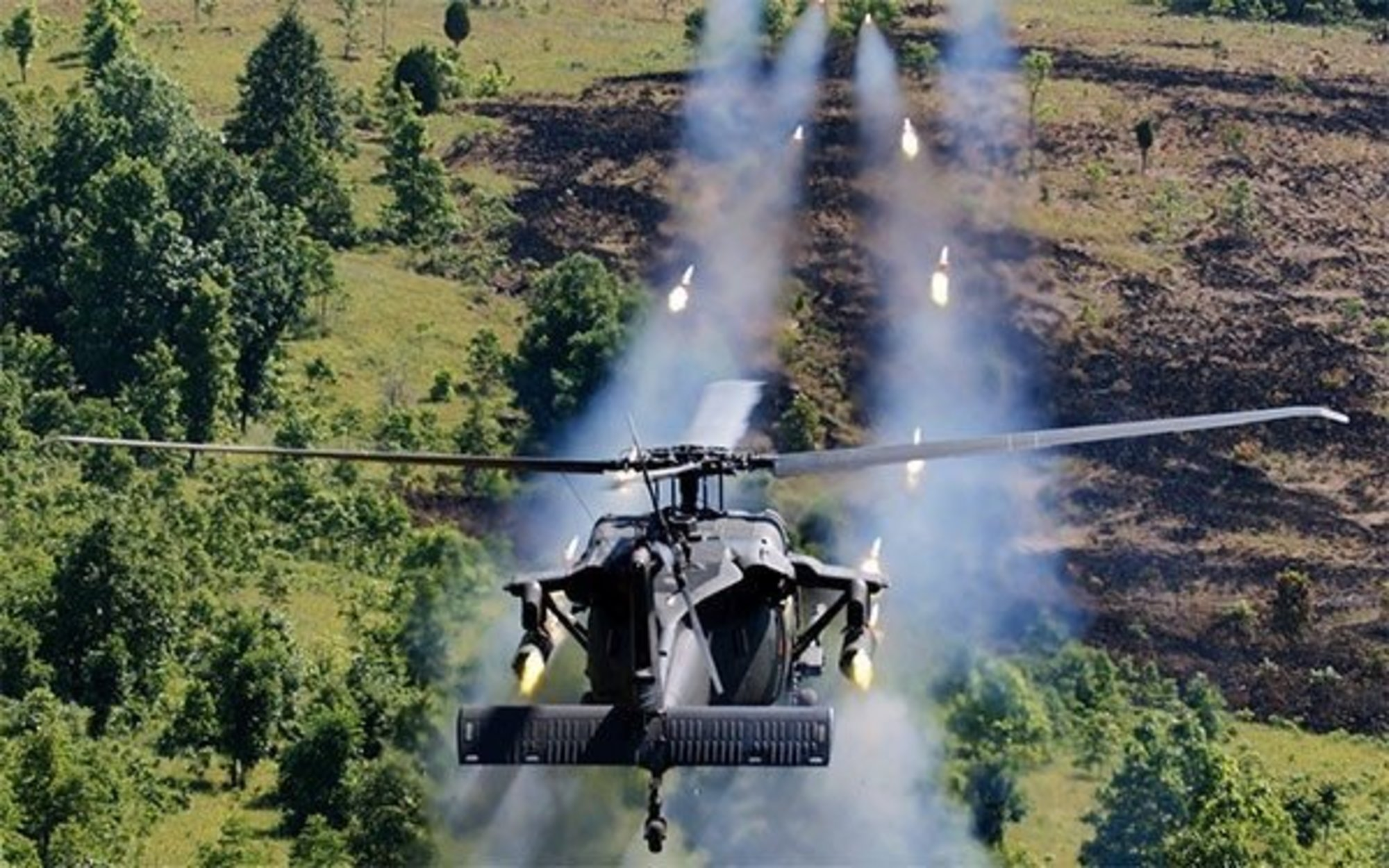
160th SOAR(A)'s MH-60M DAP fires its 2.75 in (70 mm) rockets on a U.S. Army test range

- MH-60M Black Hawk: Special operations variant of UH-60M for U.S. Army. Equipped with in-flight refueling probe, Rockwell Collins Common Avionics Architecture System (CAAS) glass cockpit, updated sensors and defensive systems such as the AN/APQ-187 Silent Knight terrain-following radar, and more powerful YT706-GE-700 engines. All special operations Black Hawks to be modernized to MH-60M standard by 2015. Like the K-model, the MH-60M can be configured either as an assault helicopter carrying troops or as a DAP gunship.
- MH-60 Black Hawk stealth helicopter: Two specially modified MH-60s were used in the raid on Osama bin Laden's compound in Pakistan on 1 May 2011. One was damaged in a hard landing, and was subsequently destroyed by U.S. forces. These two are the only known examples of this modification. Reports subsequent to the raid stated that the aircraft used in the raid were examples of a rumored but previously unconfirmed modification of the UH-60 with reduced noise signature and stealth technology. The modifications are said to add several hundred pounds to the base helicopter including edge alignment panels, special coatings and anti-radar treatments for the windshields.
- UH-60A RASCAL: NASA-modified variant for the Rotorcraft-Aircrew Systems Concepts Airborne Laboratory; a US$25M program for the study of helicopter maneuverability in three programs, Superaugmented Controls for Agile Maneuvering Performance (SCAMP), Automated Nap-of-the-Earth (ANOE) and Rotorcraft Agility and Pilotage Improvement Demonstration (RAPID). The UH-60A RASCAL performed a fully autonomous flight on 5 November 2012. U.S. Army personnel were on board, but the flying was done by helicopter. During a two-hour flight, the Black Hawk featured terrain sensing, trajectory generation, threat avoidance, and autonomous flight control. It was fitted with a 3D-LZ laser detection and ranging (LADAR) system. The autonomous flight was performed between 200 and 400 feet. Upon landing, the onboard technology was able to pinpoint a safe landing zone, hover, and safely bring itself down.
- OPBH: On 11 March 2014, Sikorsky successfully conducted the first flight demonstration of their Optionally Piloted Black Hawk (OPBH), a milestone part of the company's Manned/Unmanned Resupply Aerial Lifter (MURAL) program to provide autonomous cargo delivery for the U.S. Army. The helicopter used the company's Matrix technology (software to improve features of autonomous, optionally-piloted VTOL aircraft) to perform autonomous hover and flight operations under the control of an operator using a man-portable Ground Control Station (GCS). The MURAL program is a cooperative effort between Sikorsky, the US Army Aviation Development Directorate (ADD), and the US Army Utility Helicopters Project Office (UH PO). The purpose of creating an optionally-manned Black Hawk is to make the aircraft autonomously carry out resupply missions and expeditionary operations while increasing sorties and maintaining crew rest requirements and leaving pilots to focus more on sensitive operations.
- S-70 Unmanned Aircraft System ("U-Hawk"): Modified UH-60L demonstrator converted into an uncrewed cargo drone by removing the cockpit and adding clamshell doors. The cockpit, pilot, and crew chief stations are removed allowing the full cabin space to be used for mission packages and increasing usable space by 25% compared to previous variants. The aircraft is capable of autonomous or fly-by-wire control and can be operated from a tablet-like device. It can self-deploy to a range of 1,600 nm with a total endurance of 14 hours without refueling; this can be extended through usage of internal fuel tanks. Payload capacity is 7,000 internal, 9,000 sling loaded, or 10,000 mixed, which is roughly comparable by weight to that of a crewed UH-60L. Configured for cargo, the aircraft can carry up to four Joint Modular Intermodal Containers (twice as much as standard UH-60 variants), or ammunition pods for the M270 and HIMARS rocket systems, or two canisters for the Naval Strike Missile. For direct engagements, the U-Hawk is designed to carry "launch quivers" of 24-50 "air-launched effects" munitions.

==== VIP ====
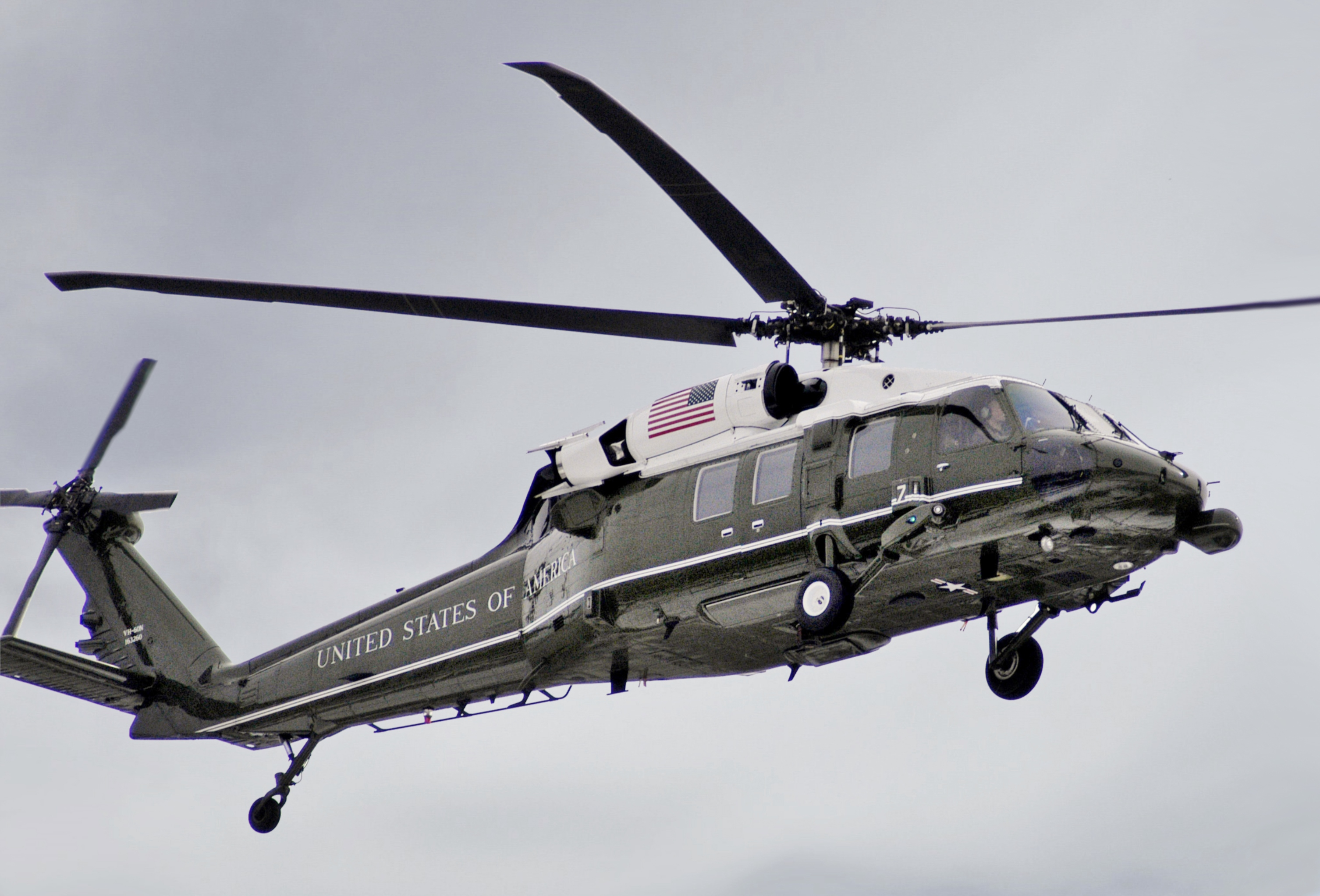
"White Top" VH-60Ns used to transport the president of the U.S.

- VH-60D Night Hawk: VIP-configured HH-60D, used for presidential transport by USMC. T700-GE-401C engines. Variant was later redesignated VH-60N.
- VH-60N White Hawk "White Top": Modified UH-60A with some features from the SH-60B/F Seahawks. Is one of the VIP-configured USMC helicopter models that perform presidential and VIP transport as Marine One. The VH-60N entered service in 1988 and nine helicopters were delivered.

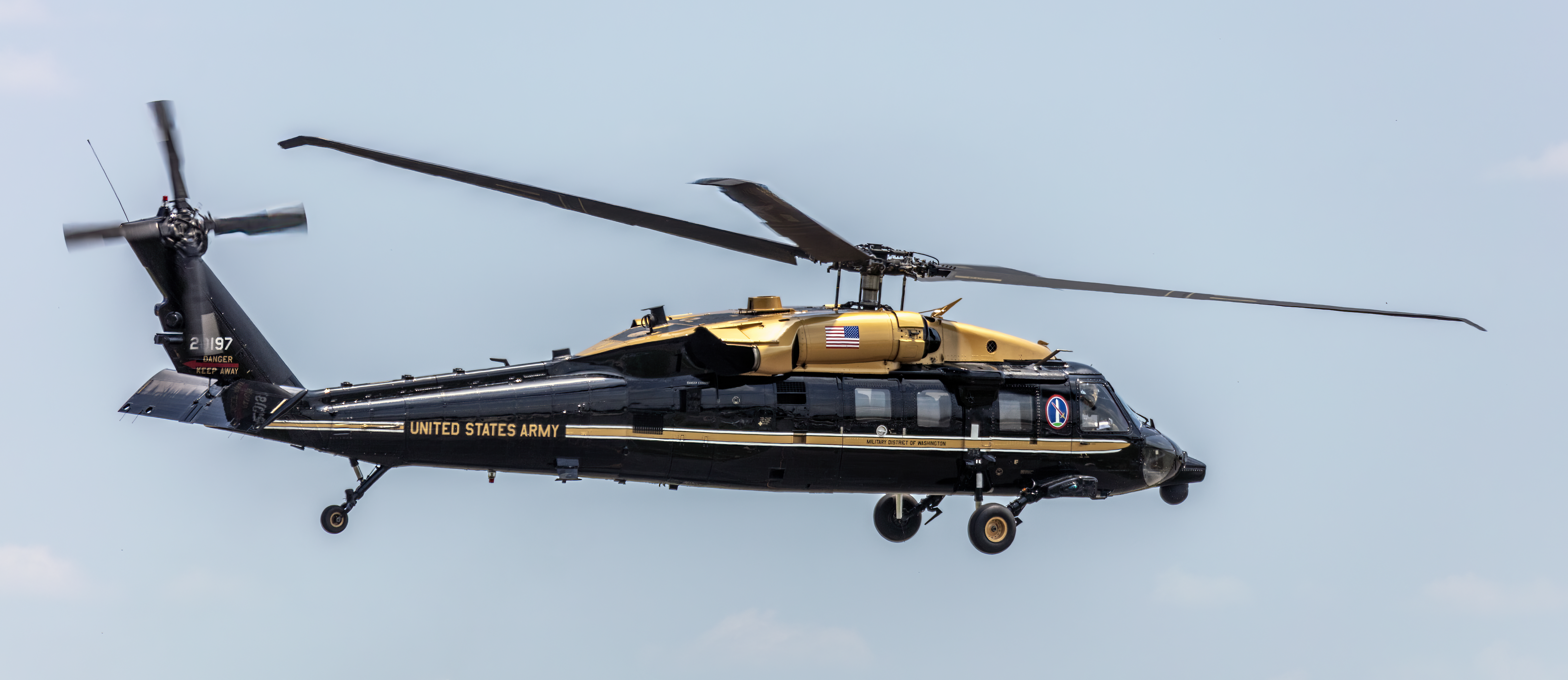
"Gold Top" VH-60M

- VH-60M Black Hawk "Gold Top": Heavily modified UH-60M used for executive transport. Members of the Joint Chiefs, Congressional leadership, and other DoD personnel are flown on these exclusively by Alpha company, 12th Aviation Battalion at Fort Belvoir, Virginia.

=== Export variants ===
- UH-60J Black Hawk: Variant for the Japanese Air Self Defense Force and Maritime Self Defense Force produced under license by Mitsubishi Heavy Industries. Also known as the S-70-12.
- UH-60JA Black Hawk: Variant for the Japanese Ground Self Defense Force. It is produced under license by Mitsubishi Heavy Industries.
- AH-60L Arpía: Export variant for Colombia developed by Elbit Systems, Sikorsky, and the Colombian Aerospace Force. It is Counter-insurgency (COIN) attack variant with improved electronics, firing system, FLIR, radar, light rockets and machine guns.
- AH-60L Battle Hawk: Export armed variant unsuccessfully tendered for Australian Army project AIR87, similar to AH-60L Arpía III. Sikorsky has also offered a Battlehawk armed variant for export in the form of armament kits and upgrades. Sikorsky's Armed Black Hawk demonstrator has tested a 20 mm turreted cannon, and different guided missiles. The United Arab Emirates ordered Battlehawk kits in 2011.

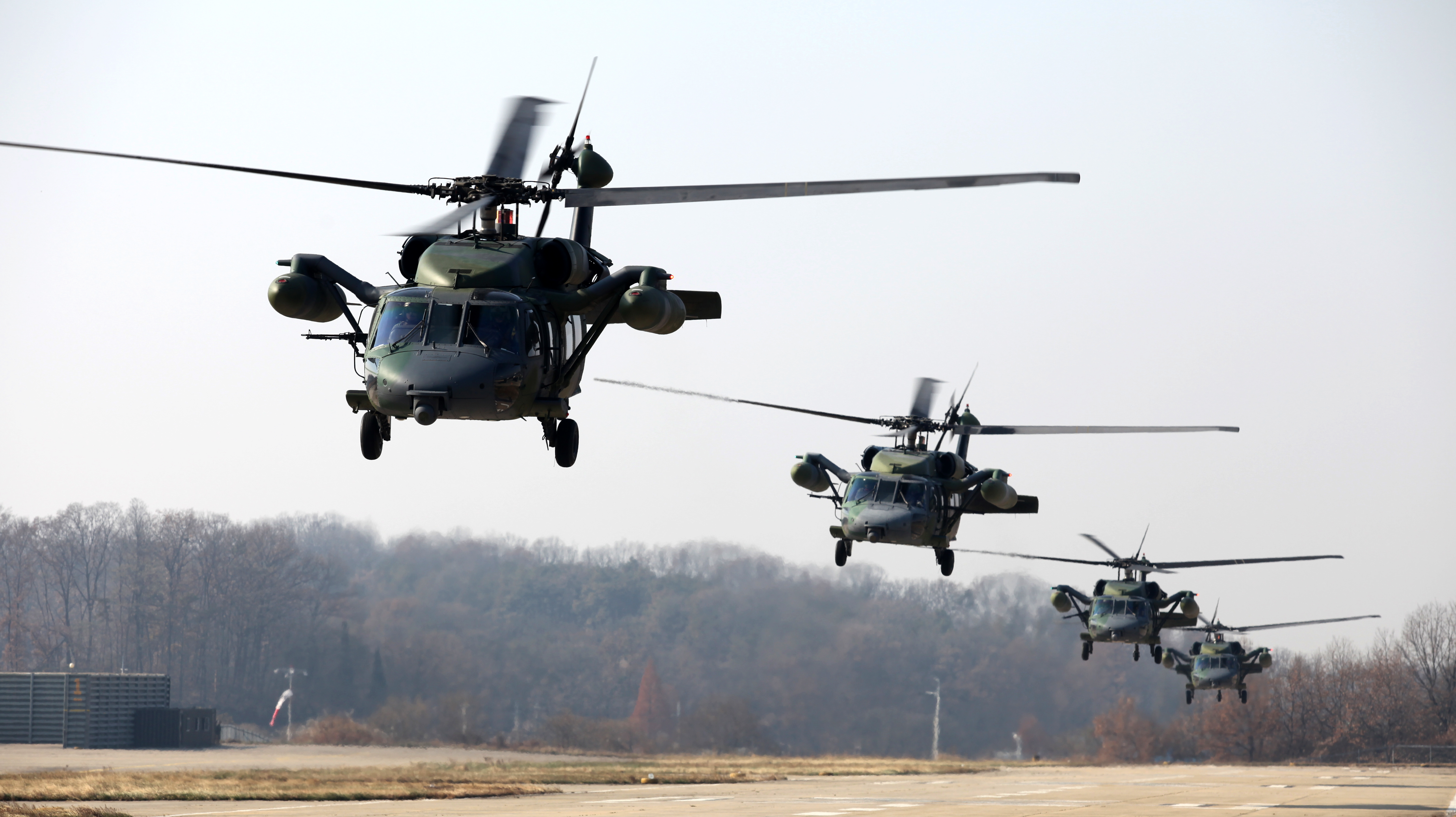
South Korean UH-60P

- UH-60P Black Hawk: Variant for South Korean Army, based on UH-60L with some improvements. Around 150 were produced under license by Korean Air.
- S-70A Black Hawk: Sikorsky's designation for Black Hawk. The designation is often used for exports.
  - S-70A-1 Desert Hawk: Export variant for the Royal Saudi Land Forces.
  - S-70A-L1 Desert Hawk: Aeromedical evacuation variant for the Royal Saudi Land Forces.
  - S-70A-5 Black Hawk: Export variant manufactured in the U.S. for the Philippine Air Force.
  - S-70A-6 Black Hawk: Export variant for Thailand.
  - S-70A-9 Black Hawk: Export variant for Australia, assembled under license by Hawker de Havilland. The first eight were delivered to the Royal Australian Air Force, subsequently transferred to the Australian Army; the remainder were delivered straight to the Army after rotary-wing assets were divested by the Air Force in 1989.
  - S-70A-11 Black Hawk: Export variant for the Royal Jordanian Air Force.
  - S-70A-12 Black Hawk: Search and rescue model for the Japanese Air Self-Defense Force and Maritime Self-Defense Force. Also known as the UH-60J.
  - S-70A-14 Black Hawk: Export variant for Brunei.
  - S-70A-16 Black Hawk: Engine test bed for the Rolls-Royce/Turbomeca RTM 332.
  - S-70A-17 Black Hawk: Export variant for Turkey.
  - S-70A-18 Black Hawk: UH-60P and HH-60P for Republic of Korea Armed Forces built under license.
  - Sikorsky/Westland S-70-19 Black Hawk: This variant is built under license in the United Kingdom by Westland. Also known as the WS-70.
  - S-70A-20 Black Hawk: VIP transport variant for Thailand.
  - S-70A-21 Black Hawk: Export variant for Egypt.
  - S-70A-22 Black Hawk: VH-60P for South Korea built under license. Used for VIP transport by the Republic of Korea Air Force. Its fuselage is tipped with white to distinguish it from normal HH-60P.
  - S-70A-24 Black Hawk: Export variant for Mexico.
  - S-70A-26 Black Hawk: Export variant for Morocco.
  - S-70A-27 Black Hawk: Export variant for Royal Hong Kong Auxiliary Air Force and Hong Kong Government Flying Service; three built.
  - S-70A-28D Black Hawk: Export variant for Turkish Army.
  - S-70A-30 Black Hawk: Export variant for Argentine Air Force, used as a VIP transport helicopter by the Presidential fleet; one built.
  - S-70A-33 Black Hawk: Export variant for Royal Brunei Air Force.
  - S-70A-34 Black Hawk: VIP transport variant for Malaysia, known as "Whitehawk", operated by Royal Malaysian Air Force; two built.
  - S-70A-39 Black Hawk: VIP transport variant for Chile; one built.
  - S-70A-42 Black Hawk: Export variant for Austria.
  - S-70A-43 Black Hawk: Export variant for Royal Thai Army.
  - S-70A-50 Black Hawk: Export variant for Israel; 15 built.
  - S-70C-2 Black Hawk: Export variant for the People's Republic of China; 24 built.
  - HM-2: Brazilian Army designation for the S-70A.
- S-70i Black Hawk: International military variant assembled by Sikorsky's subsidiary, PZL Mielec in Poland.
- S-70M Black Hawk: Modified military variant assembled by Sikorsky's subsidiary, PZL Mielec in Poland from 2021.

For other Sikorsky S-70 variants, see Sikorsky SH-60 Seahawk, Sikorsky HH-60 Pave Hawk, Piasecki X-49 SpeedHawk, and Sikorsky HH-60 Jayhawk articles.

== Operators ==
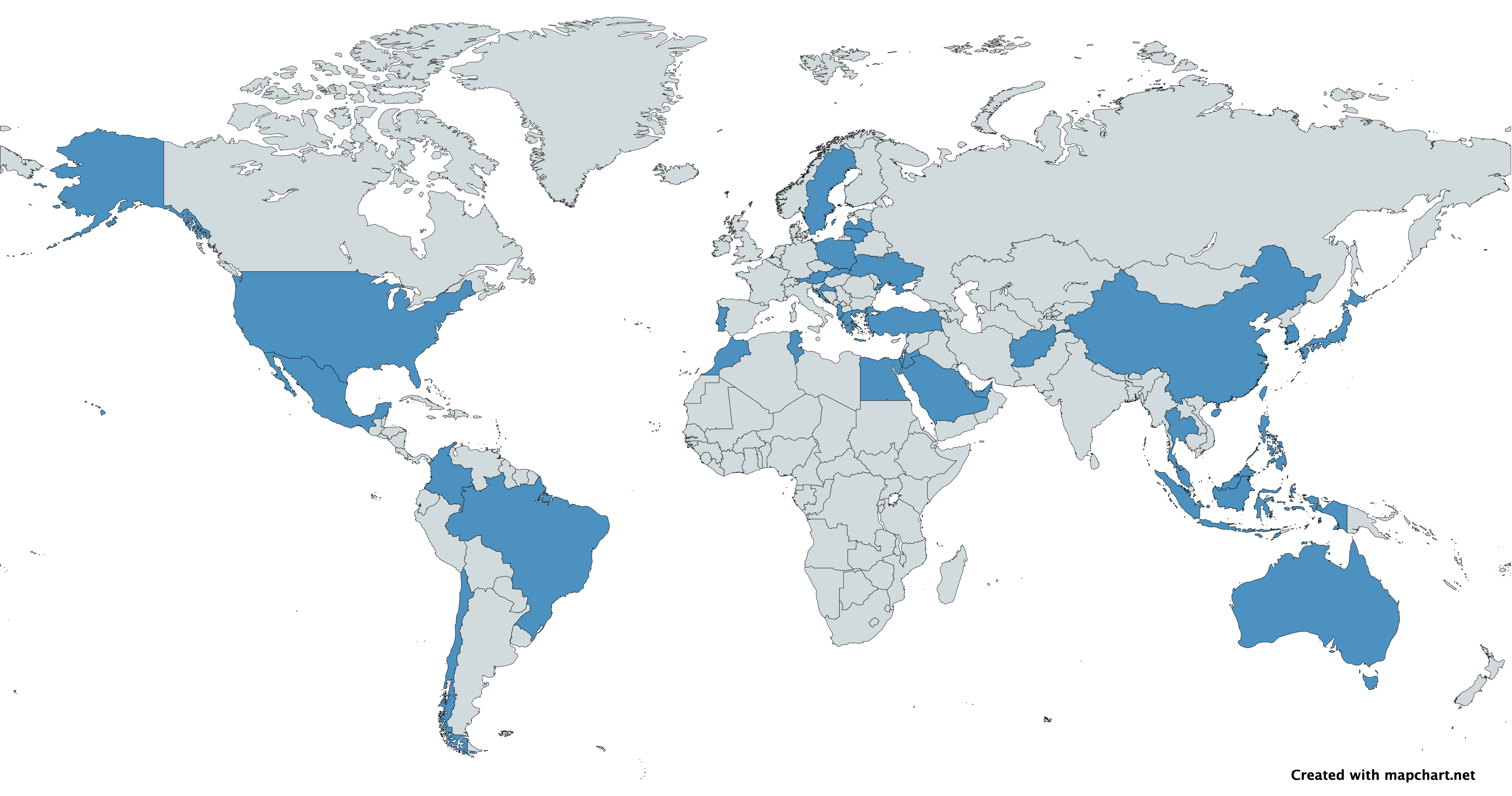
Map with UH-60 operators in blue

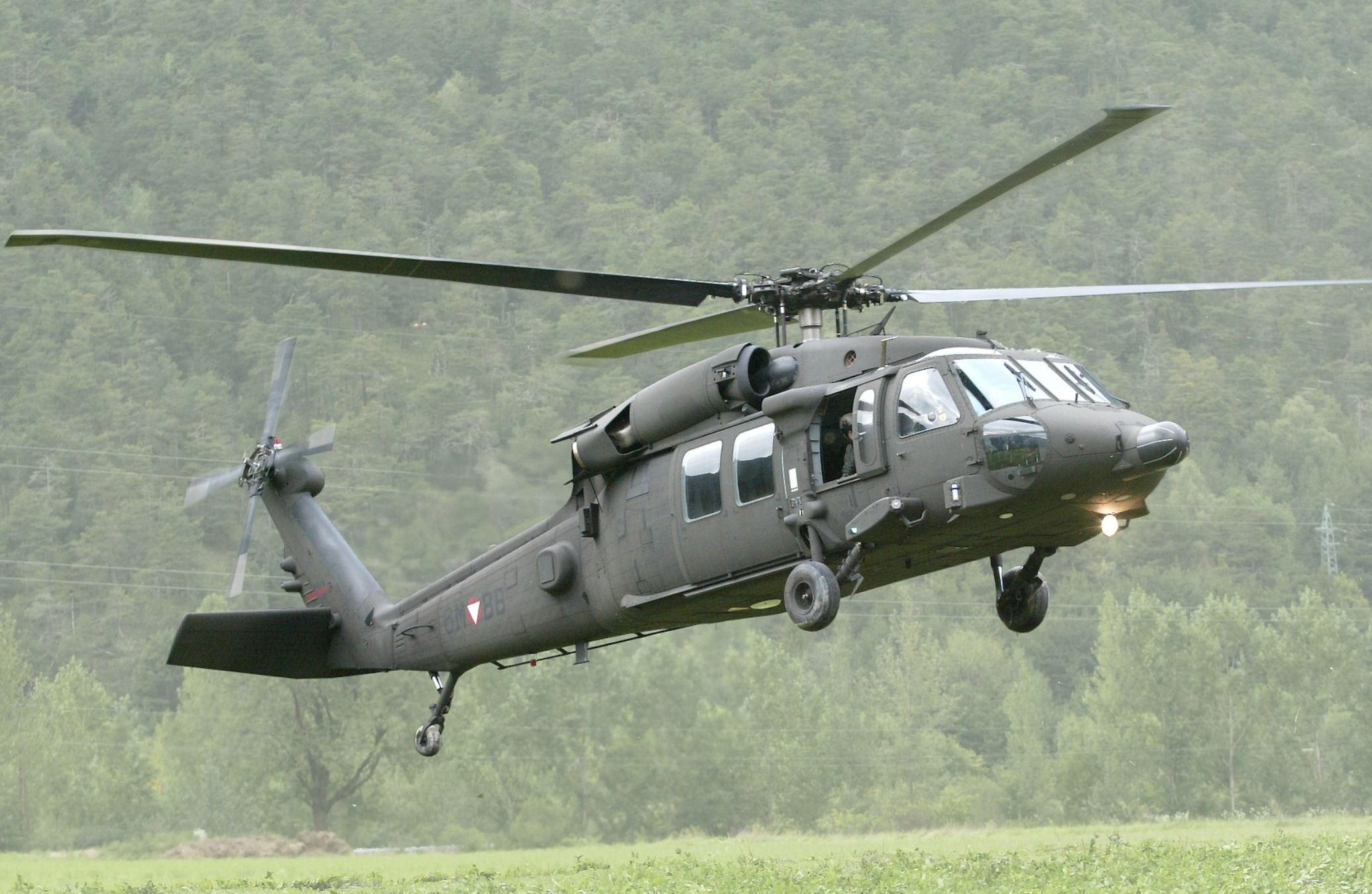
An Austrian Air Force S-70A42 lands in Paznaun valley

See SH-60 Seahawk, HH-60 Pave Hawk, and HH-60 Jayhawk for operators of military H-60/S-70 variants; see Sikorsky S-70 for non-military operators of other H-60/S-70 family helicopters.

Islamic Emirate of Afghanistan

- Taliban (captured from the Afghan Air Force in August 2021) Some damaged helicopters have been repaired.

Albania

- Albanian Air Force - 2 (4 on order)

Australia

- Australian Army - 39 S-70A-9 in original orders in 1986 and 1987. Retired in 2021 with 5 lost. 40 UH-60M ordered in 2023, with 15 delivered by mid-2025.

Austria

- Austrian Air Force

Bahrain

- Royal Bahraini Air Force

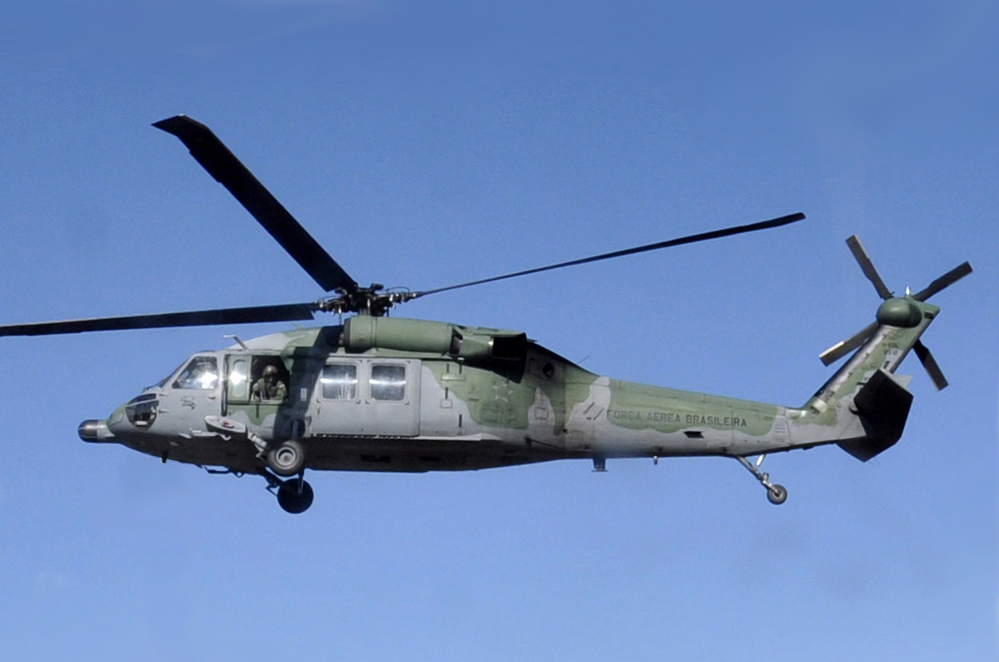
A UH-60 of the Brazilian Air Force

Brazil

- Brazilian Air Force - 16 UH-60L since the 2000s, used by both SAR, CSAR and tactical transport for air force units and friendly forces.
- Brazilian Army - 4 UH-60L since 1994 to operate in the Peruvian-Ecuadorian border then transferred to operate in Amazon rainforest with the 4th Aviation Battalion. In 2024, the Army decided to acquire 12 more UH-60M, with the first deliveries by the end of 2025, to replace both HM-1 Pantera and HM-3 Cougars
- Brazilian Navy (see SH-60) - 6 SH-60 used by the HS-1 Guerreiro Squadron
- Military Police of Rio de Janeiro State - showed interest to acquire Black Hawk helicopters in May 2025, after both navy and police helicopters were shot by criminal factions in Rio de Janeiro

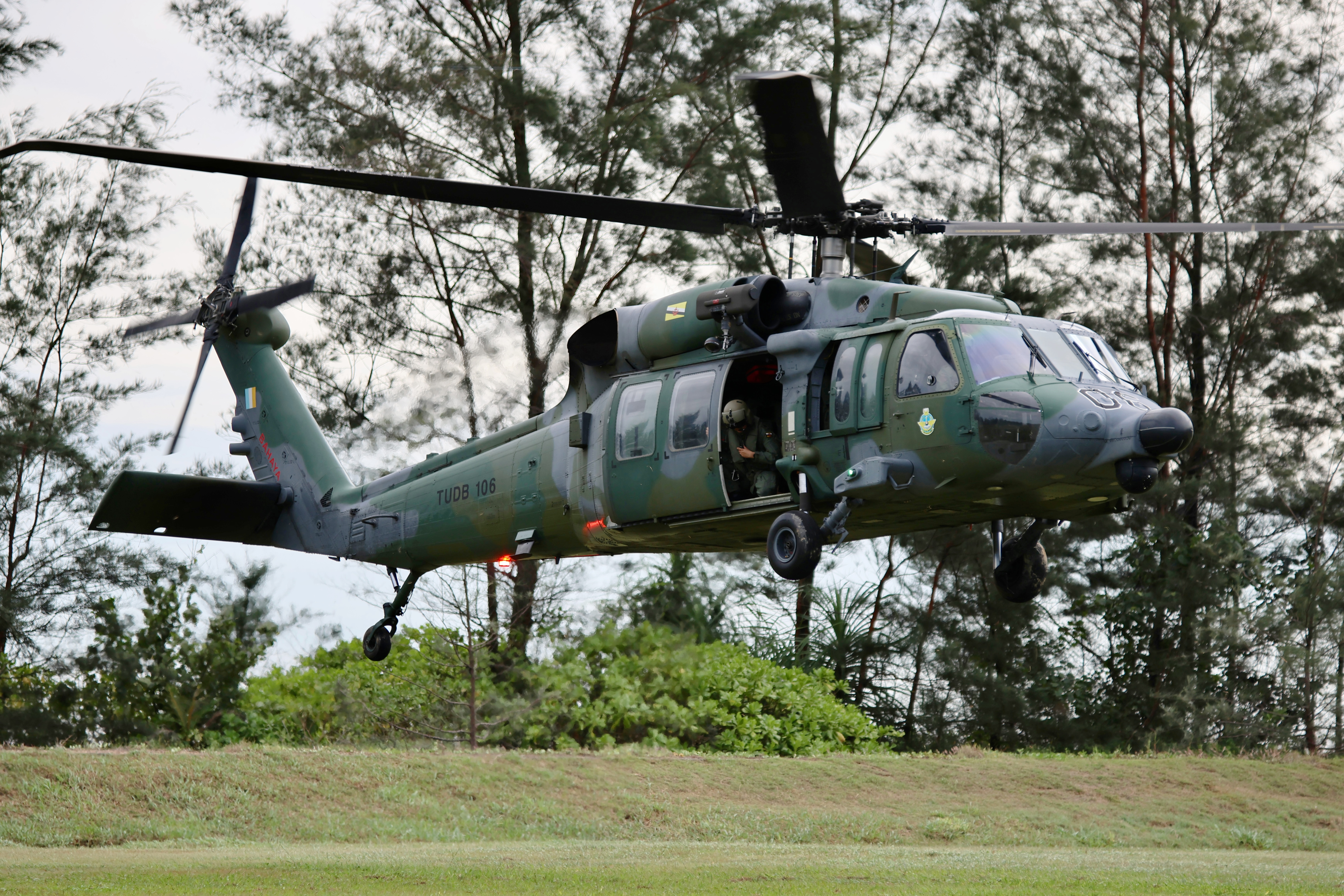
A S-70i of the Royal Brunei Air Force in 2023

Brunei

- Royal Brunei Air Force S-70i

Canada

- Royal Canadian Mounted Police - Two leased UH-60s to assist with patrolling the Canada-US border.

Chile

- Chilean Air Force

China

- People's Liberation Army

Colombia

- Colombian Aerospace Force AH-60L Arpía (24)
- Colombian Army - Received five UH-60Ls originally ordered for the Venezuelan Army but that order was canceled. S-70i (7 as of 2013)

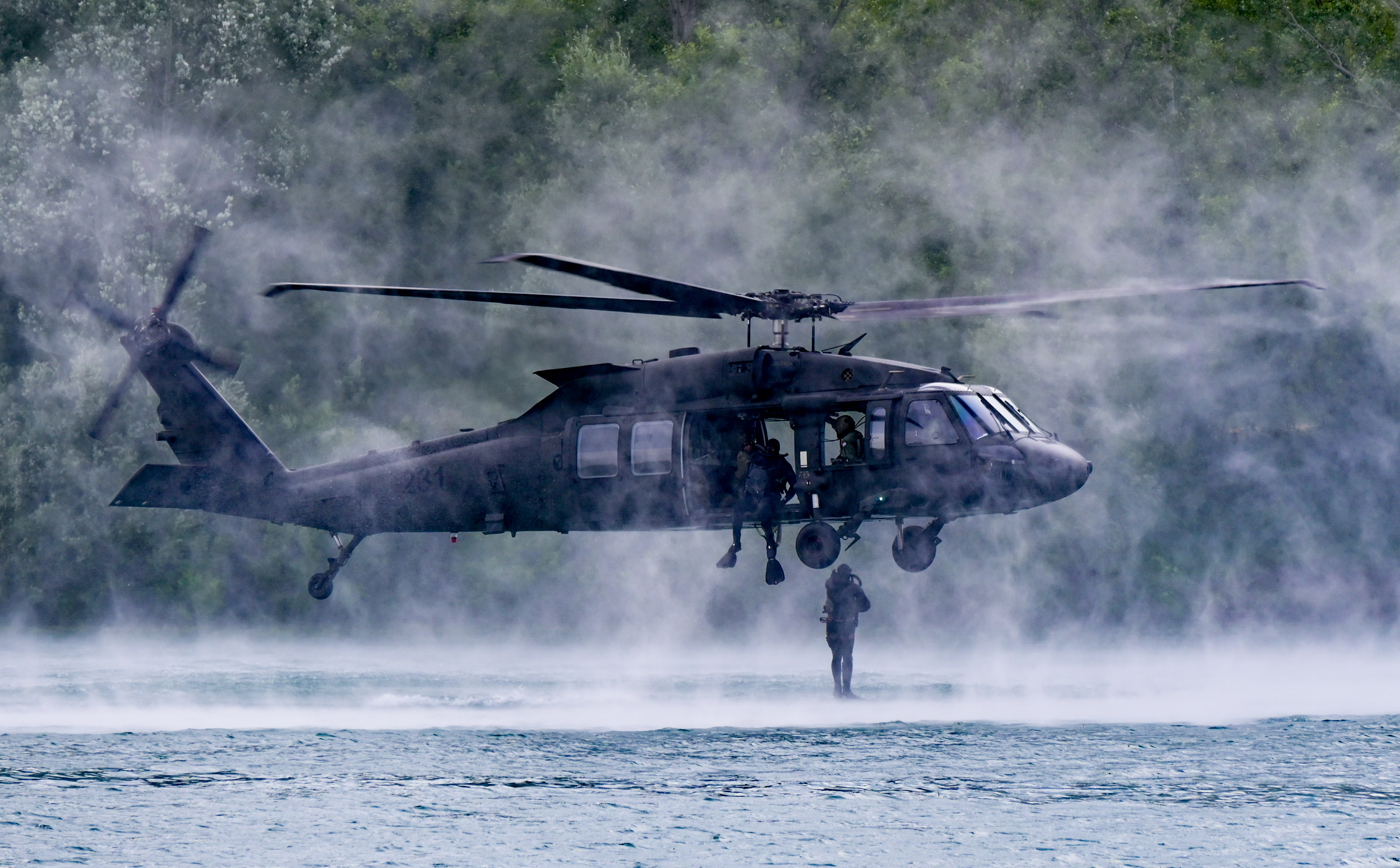
A Croatian Air Force UH-60 during an exercise

Croatia

- Croatian Air Force - 8 UH-60Ms being procured with 4 received as of March 2024. 8 more on order.

Egypt

- Egyptian Air Force

Greece

- Hellenic Army - 35 UH-60Ms ordered in 2024

Indonesia

- Indonesian Army - 22 S-70M Black Hawks on order as of 2023.

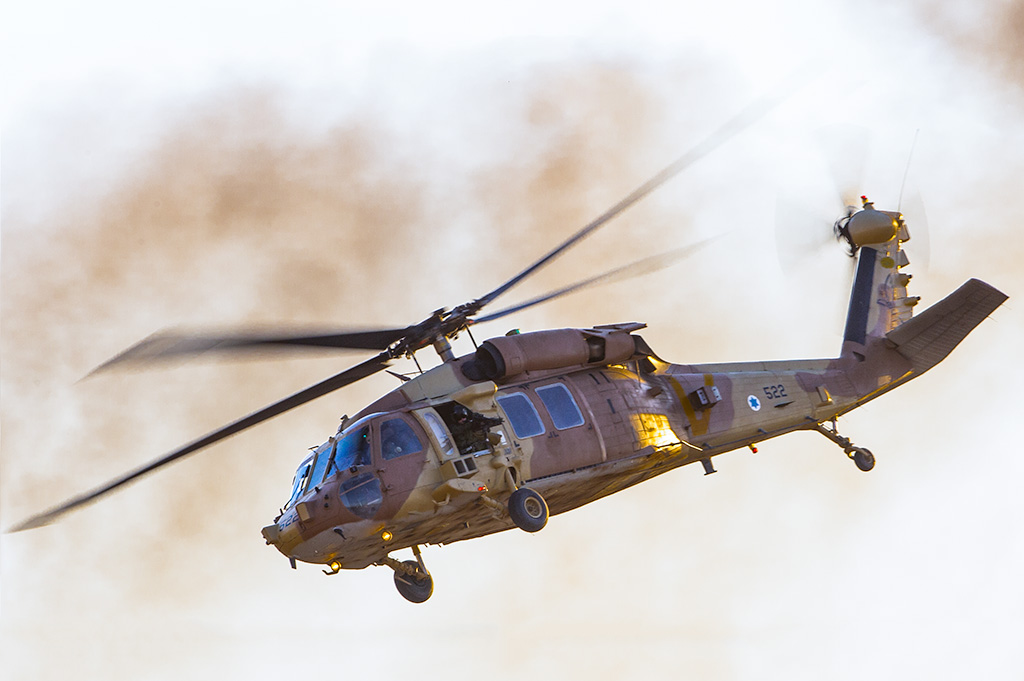
An Israeli Air Force UH-60 Yanshuf

Israel

- Israeli Air Force

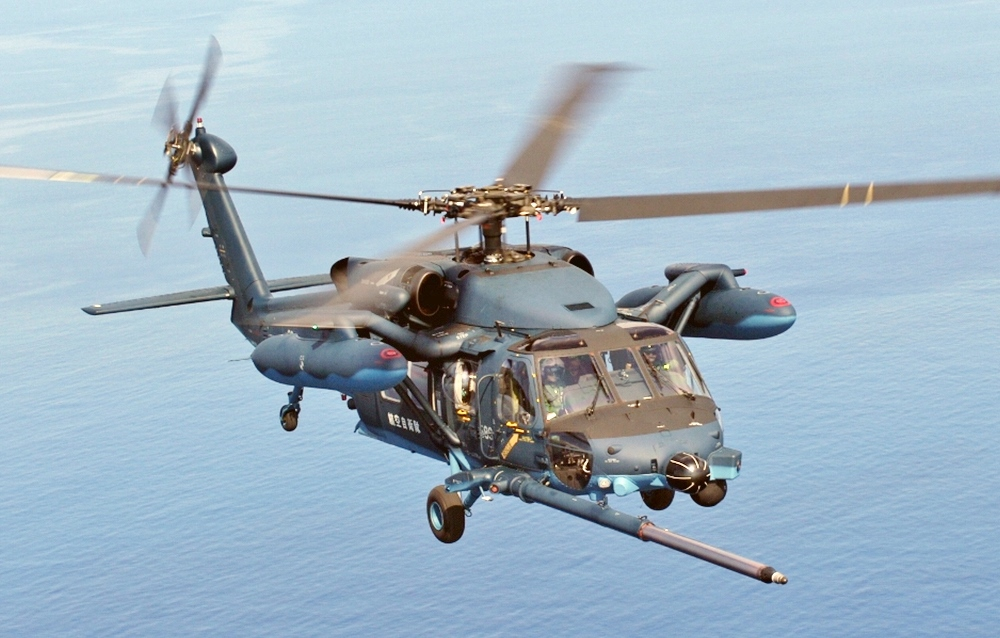
A Japan Air Self-Defence Force UH-60J in flight

Japan

- Japan Air Self-Defence Force UH-60J
- Japan Ground Self-Defence Force UH-60JA
- Japan Maritime Self-Defence Force UH-60J (see also SH-60J/K/L)

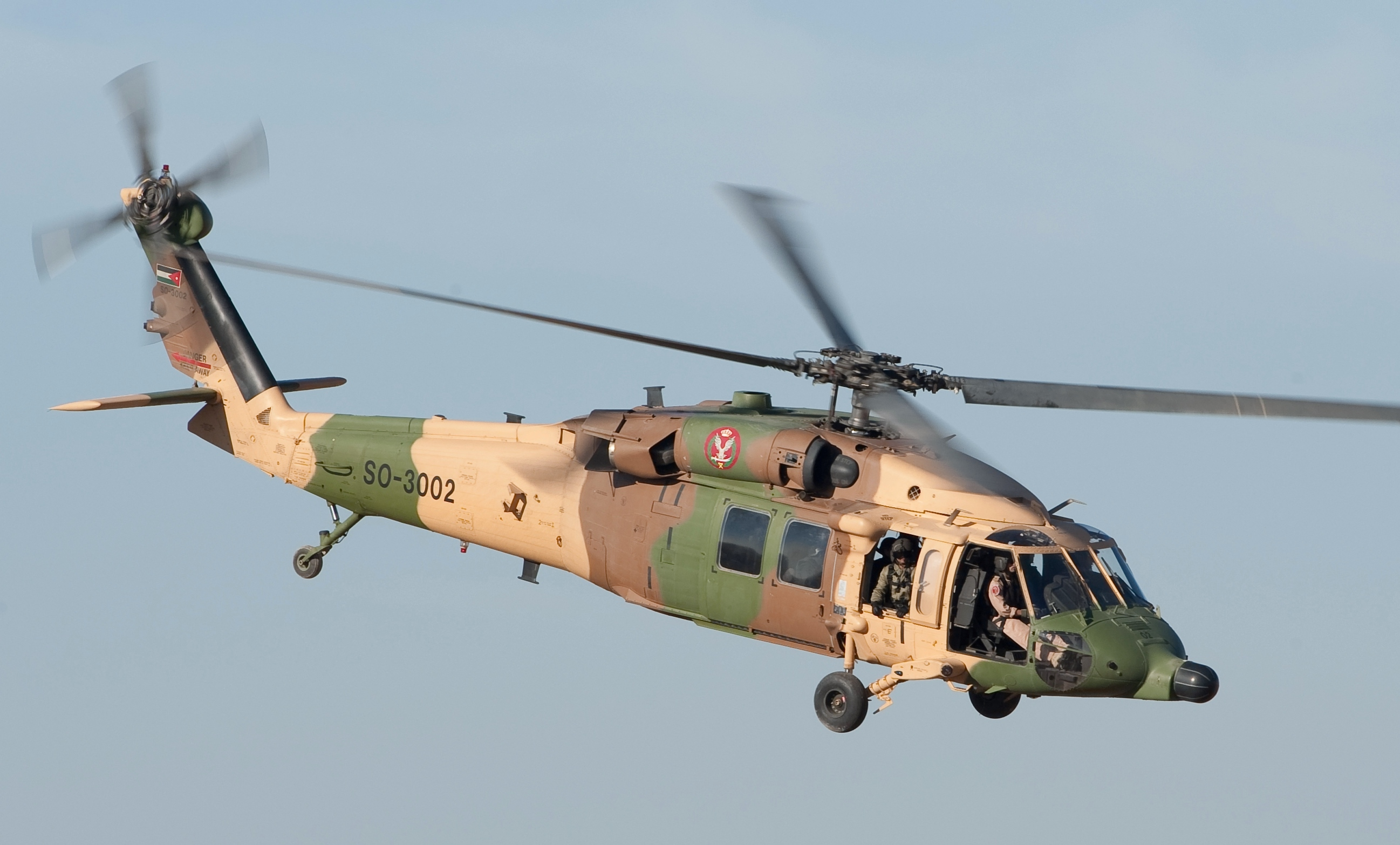
A Royal Jordanian Air Force UH-60L on lift off

Jordan

- Royal Jordanian Air Force

Kosovo

- Kosovo Security Force

Latvia

- Latvian Air Force - UH-60M (2 received, another 2 on order)

Lithuania

- Lithuanian Air Force - UH-60M (2 delivered, another 2 on order)

Malaysia

- Royal Malaysian Air Force - 2 S-70A-34 Whitehawks delivered, used for VIP transports.

Mexico

- Mexican Air Force
- Mexican Navy

Morocco

- Royal Moroccan Gendarmerie

Norway

- Royal Norwegian Navy - 6 MH-60R Seahawk as frigate helicopters, on order
- Norwegian Army - 9 HH-60Ws on order, and 21 UH-60Ms on order

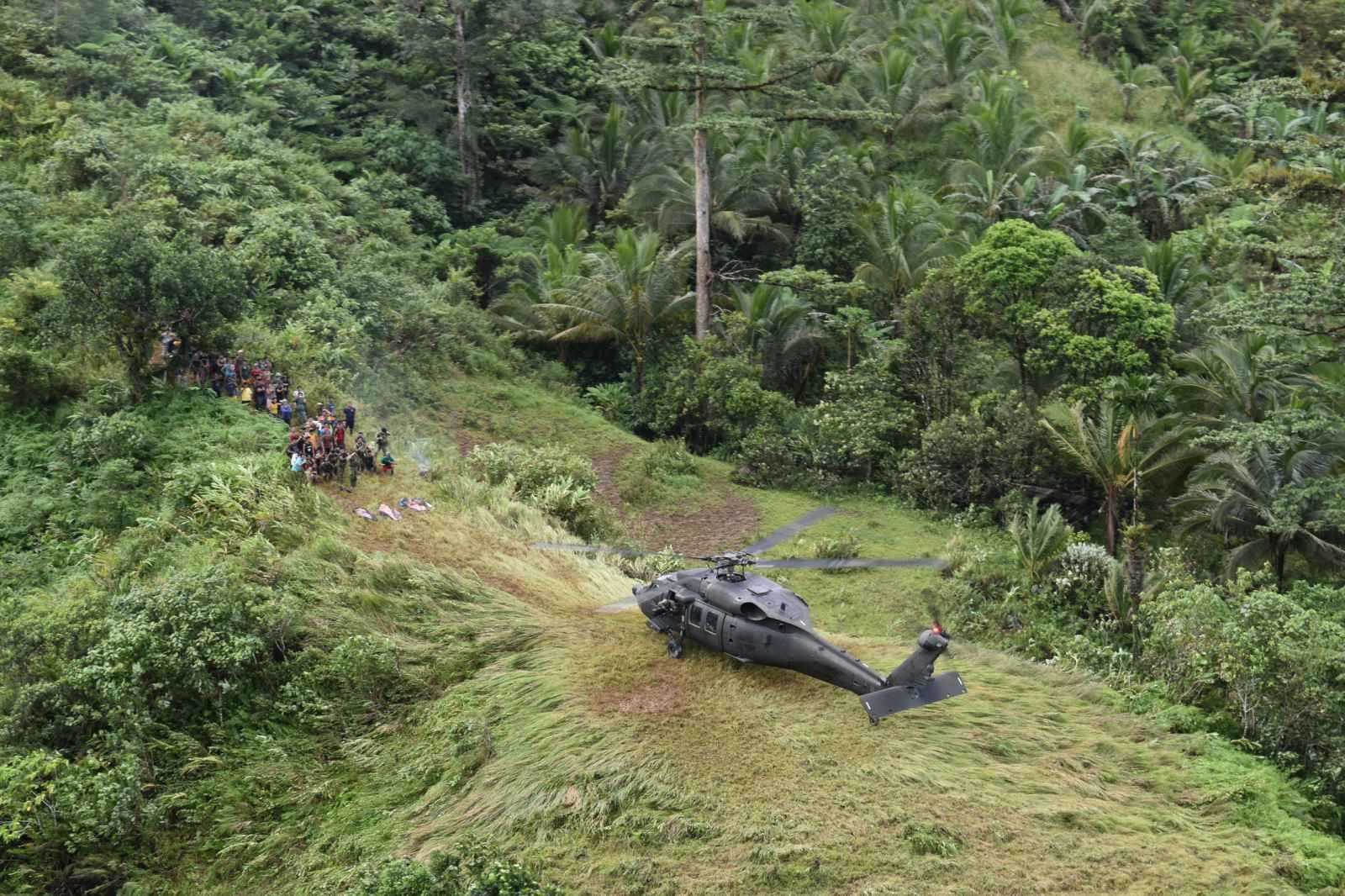
PAF S-70i responds to landslide and possible SAR, 2023

Philippines

- Philippine Air Force - 47 S-70i delivered

Poland

- Polish Special Forces - 4 S-70i helicopters (4 on order)

Portugal

- Portuguese Air Force - 13 (6 UH-60A and 7 UH-60L ordered for aerial firefighting, MEDIVAC and transport
- Portuguese Army - 3 UH-60L ordered for tactical transport, special operations, MEDIVAC, Search and rescue, disaster response and forest firefighting.

Saudi Arabia

- Royal Saudi Air Force
- Royal Saudi Land Forces
- Saudi Arabian National Guard
- Royal Saudi Navy

Republic of Korea

- Republic of Korea Air Force
- Republic of Korea Army UH-60P
- Republic of Korea Navy

Slovakia

- Slovak Air Force - 11 UH-60M in service, 12 refurbished UH-60L on order.

Sweden

- Swedish Air Force

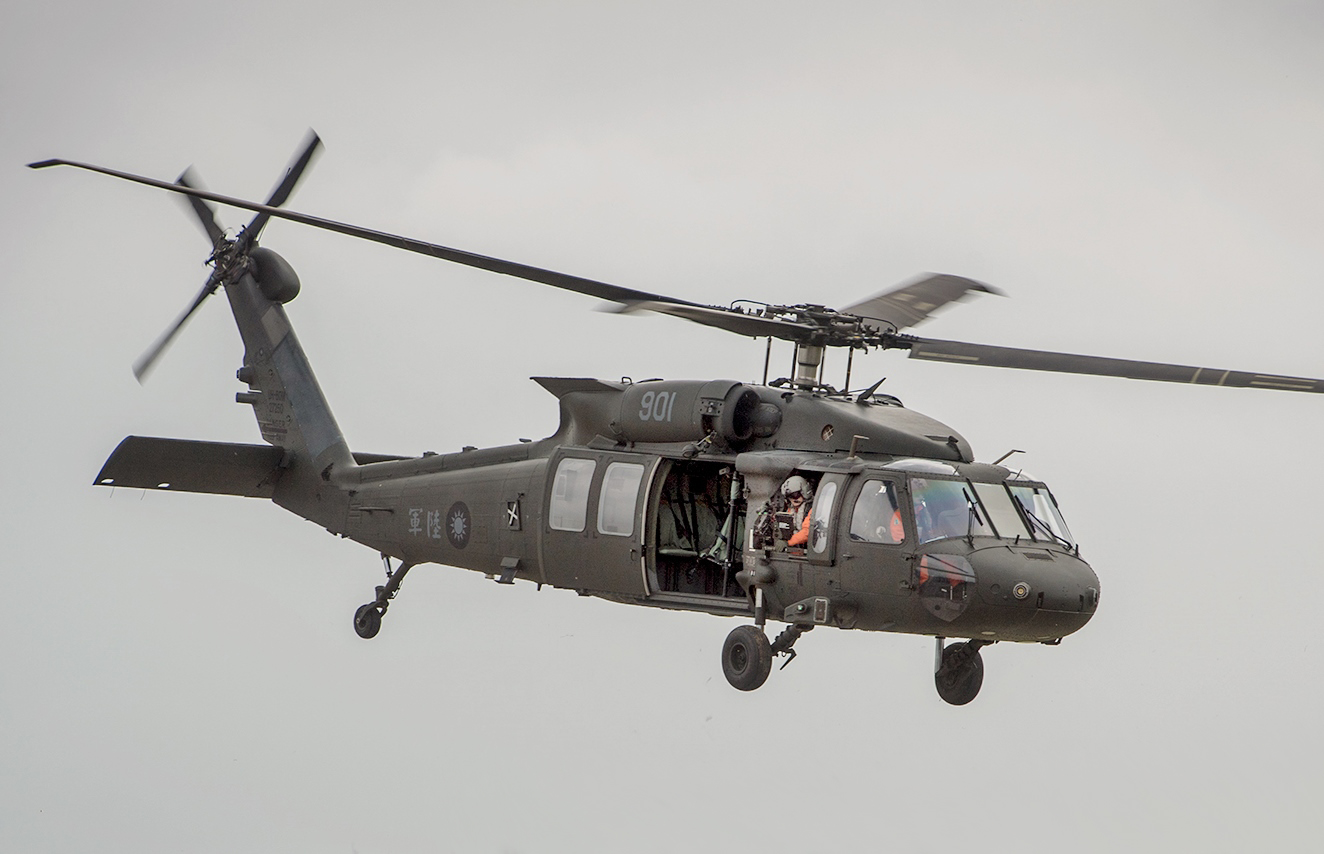
A Republic of China Army UH-60M Black Hawk

Taiwan (Republic of China)

- Republic of China Air Force
- Republic of China Army
- Republic of China Navy

Thailand

- Royal Thai Army UH-60L; UH-60M
- Royal Thai Air Force
- Royal Thai Navy (see SH-60)

Tunisia

- Tunisian Air Force

Turkey

- Turkish Air Force - (6 T-70s on order) First unit delivered in January 2023.
- Turkish Land Forces- 22+ T-70s on order with first delivered.
- Special Forces Command(Turkey) - 6 T-70s ordered with deliveries underway.
- Turkish Naval Forces (see Sikorsky SH-60 Seahawk)
- Gendarmerie General Command (Turkey) - 14 T-70s ordered with 3 delivered.
- General Directorate of Security(Turkey) - 20 T-70s ordered
- General Directorate of Forestry(Turkey) - 3 T-70s ordered with 2 delivered as of 2024.

United Arab Emirates

- United Arab Emirates Air Force

Ukraine

- Main Directorate of Intelligence (Ukraine) - 2 UH-60As One more UH-60A+ was crowdfunded for GUR by Czech supporters under the "Gift for Putin" (Dárek pro-Putina) initiative and will be delivered in 2025.

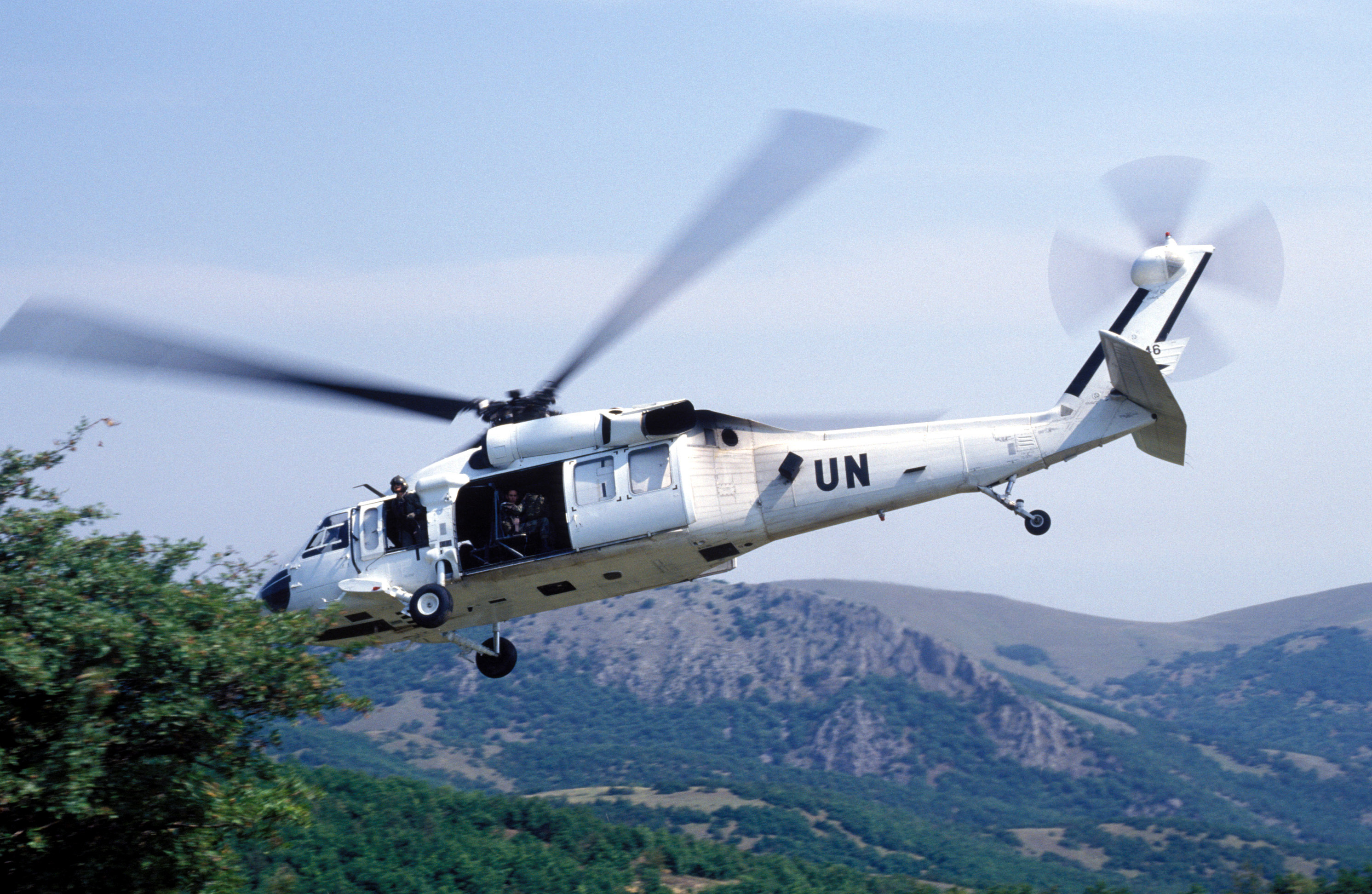
A US Army UH-60 Blackhawk with United Nations designations during the Bosnian War.

United States

- Charlotte County Sheriff's Office - Operates a refurbished UH-60.
- United States Air Force (see HH-60)
- United States Army - The U.S. Army has a stated requirement for 2,135 aircraft. The service operates 19 HH-60Ls, 346 HH-60Ms (medevac), 20 UH-60As (estimated), 800 UH-60Ls, 931 UH-60Ms, and 90 UH-60Vs as of January 2025.
- United States Navy (see SH-60)
- United States Coast Guard (see MH-60)
- United States Marine Corps - HMX-1 operates the VH-60N “Whitehawk” for VIP transport
- United States Department of State
- United States Department of Homeland Security
- Florida State Guard - By the end of 2024, the Florida State Guard purchased two UH-60 Black Hawk helicopters.

=== Former operators ===
Islamic Republic of Afghanistan - 2014 until August 2021

- Afghan Air Force

British Hong Kong

- Royal Hong Kong Auxiliary Air Force
- Government Flying Service

== Accidents ==
- From 1981 to 1987, five Black Hawks crashed (killing or injuring all on board) while flying near radio broadcast towers because their electromagnetic emissions disrupted the helicopters' flight control systems. The Black Hawk helicopters were not hardened against high-intensity radiated fields, contrary to the SH-60 Seahawk Navy variant. The pilots were instructed to fly away from emitters, and, in the long term, shielding was increased and backup systems were installed.
- On 29 July 1992, one Australian Army Black Hawk collided into terrain near Oakey Army Aviation Centre, killing two occupants.
- On 3 March 1994, a UH-60 helicopter of the 15th Fighter Wing, Republic of Korea Air Force (ROKAF) exploded above Yongin, Gyeonggi-do, killing all six personnel on board; among those killed was General Cho Kun-hae, then Chief of the Air Staff of South Korea.
- On 14 April 1994, two U.S. Army UH-60 Black Hawks in northern Iraq were shot down in a friendly fire incident by U.S. Air Force F-15 fighter jets patrolling the northern no-fly zone that had been imposed after the 1991 Gulf War, in which all twenty-six crew and passengers were killed. The pilots of the U.S. Air Force F-15s misidentified the U.S. Army Black Hawk helicopters as enemy Mil Mi-24 "Hind" helicopters.
- On 12 June 1996, two Australian Army Black Hawks collided during an Army nighttime special forces counter-terrorism exercise resulting in the death of eighteen soldiers - fifteen members of the SASR and three from the 5th Aviation Regiment.
- On 12 February 2001, two Black Hawks from Schofield Barracks, Hawaii collided during NVG formation flight training, causing loss of both aircraft, six deaths and 11 injured soldiers.
- On 12 February 2004, one Australian Army Black Hawk collided into terrain in the vicinity of Mount Walker, Queensland following contact between the tail rotor and a tree. The airframe was written off however there were no deaths - six out of the eight occupants received injuries.

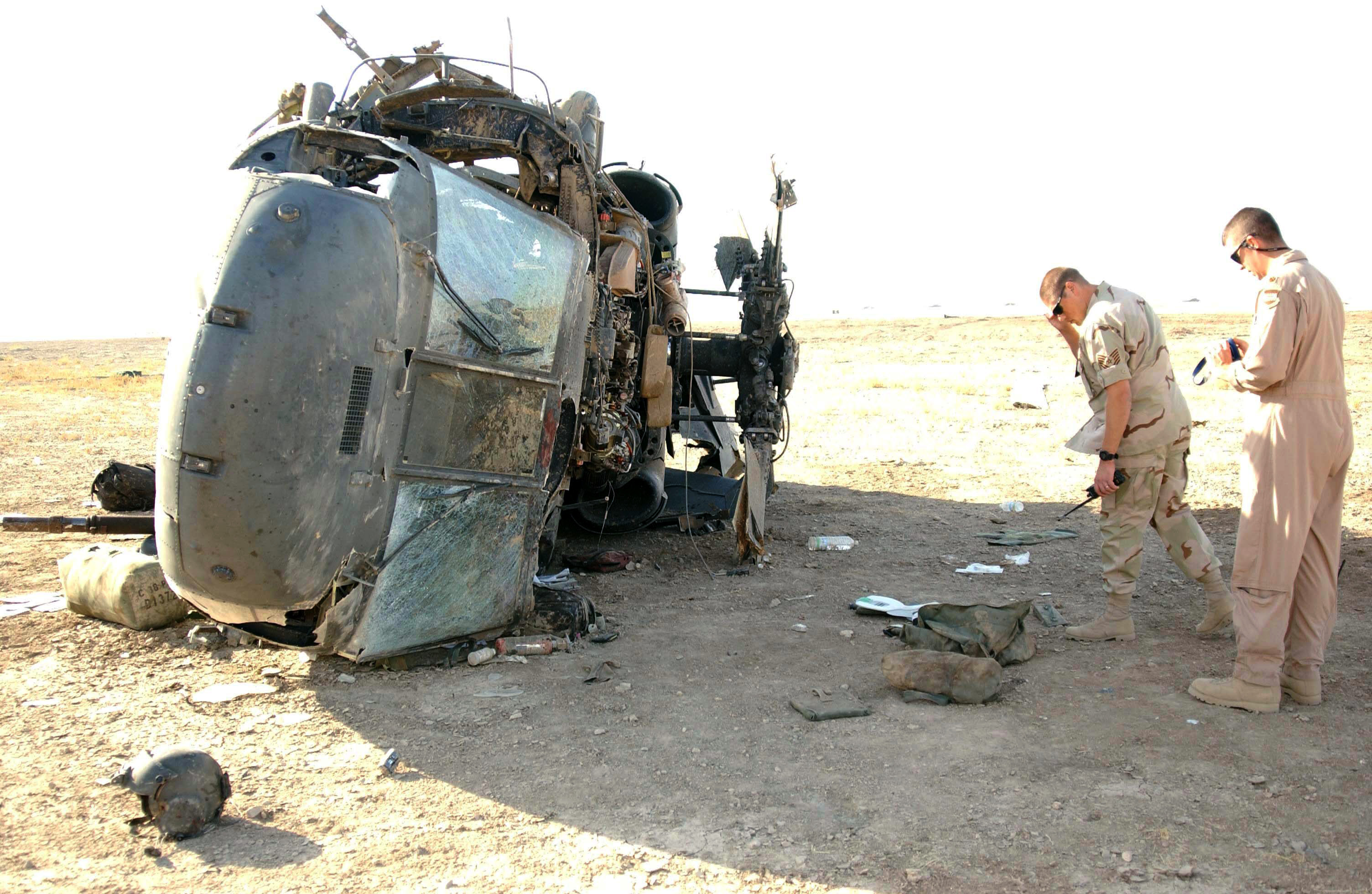
Aftermath of a crashed UH-60 in 2004, at Tallil Airbase, Iraq

- On 26 September 2004, a U.S. Army Black Hawk crashed taking off from Tallil Airbase (Nasiriyah Airport), Iraq. The crew of four was rescued.
- On 29 November 2006, one Australian Army Black Hawk crashed into and subsequently slid off the deck of HMAS Kanimbla sinking into deep waters off the coast of Fiji while conducting a training flight. The sinking resulted in the deaths of two soldiers - one pilot from the 5th Aviation Regiment, and one trooper from the SASR.
- On 10 March 2015, a UH-60 from Eglin Air Force Base crashed off the coast of the Florida Panhandle near the base. All eleven on board were killed.
- On 16 February 2018, a UH-60M helicopter deployed by the Mexican Air Force to Oaxaca after an earthquake, crashed while attempting to land, all 4 occupants on board survived but 14 people on the ground were killed.
- On 2 January 2020, a UH-60M helicopter of the Republic of China Air Force (ROCAF) in Taiwan, crashed on a mountainside, killing eight people on board, including General Shen Yi-ming, chief of the general staff of Republic of China's armed forces.
- On 23 June 2021, a Philippine Air Force S-70i crashed in Capas town in Tarlac during a night flight training, killing all 6 crew members. The unit was newly delivered in November of the previous year or only almost 8 months old.
- On 22 February 2022, two Utah National Guard Black Hawk helicopters crashed at the Snowbird, Utah ski resort during a training exercise. One Black Hawk was overcome by whiteout conditions caused by the downdraft in the snow, and crashed, causing parts of the rotor blades to strike the other helicopter, forcing a hard landing. There were no major injuries to the crew or skiers.
- On July 16, 2022, one Mexican Navy Black Hawk crashed at Sinaloa, killing 14 of the 15 marines on board.
- In September 2022, a Black Hawk operated by the Taliban crashed during a training exercise in Kabul, killing three.
- On February 15, 2023, a Black Hawk crashed killing two members of the Tennessee National Guard in Huntsville, Alabama.
- On 29 March 2023, two US Army Black Hawk medical helicopters collided during a training mission over Kentucky. All nine soldiers aboard were killed. The cause of the crash is under investigation.

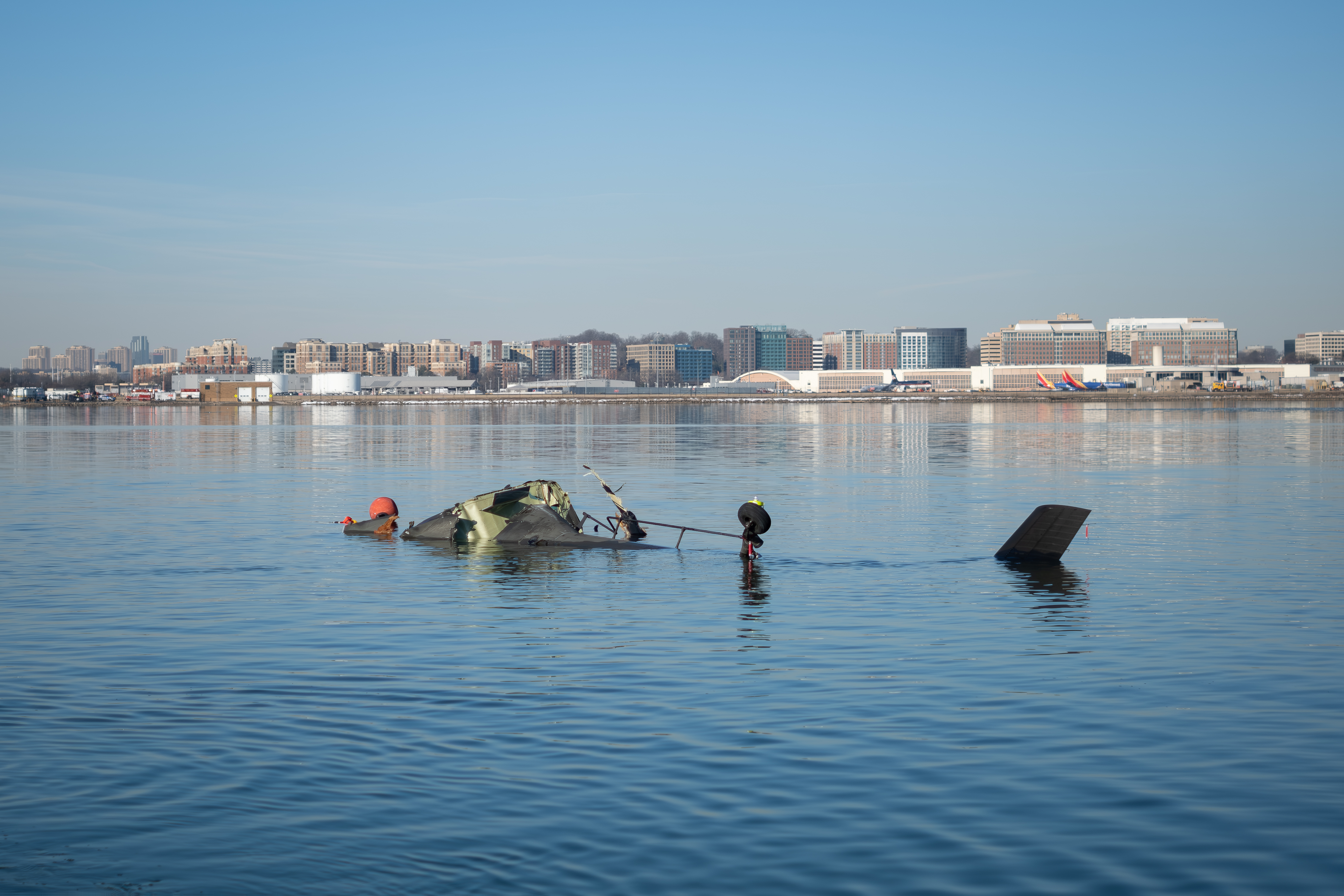
The wreckage of UH-60L 00-26860, operating as Priority Air Transport 25, after the collision into the Potomac River, Washington, D.C. in 2025.

- On 10 November 2023, a US Army Black Hawk crashed off the coast of Cyprus in the Mediterranean Sea. All 5 soldiers aboard were killed.
- On 11 September 2024, an Israel Defense Forces (IDF) Black Hawk crashed in Rafah, Gaza during a medical evacuation mission. Two soldiers were killed, and seven others were injured.
- On 29 January 2025, a U.S. Army UH-60L Black Hawk from the 12th Aviation Battalion operating as Priority Air Transport 25 collided with American Eagle Flight 5342 near Ronald Reagan Washington National Airport sending both aircraft crashing into the Potomac River. All 64 aboard the plane and all three aboard the helicopter were killed.

== Specifications (UH-60M) ==
UH-60 3-view diagram

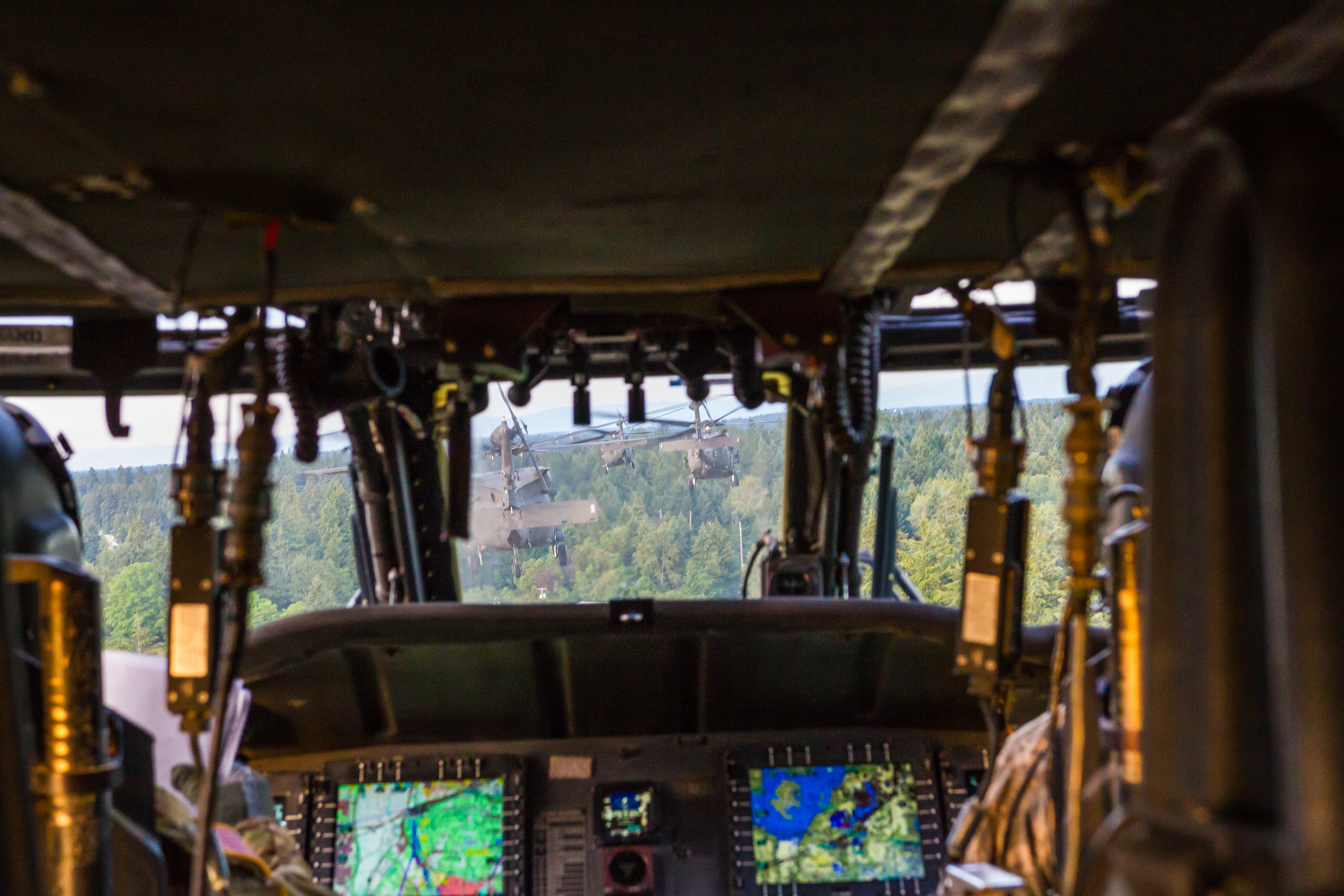
UH-60 fly in formation on training mission in Washington State in 2016

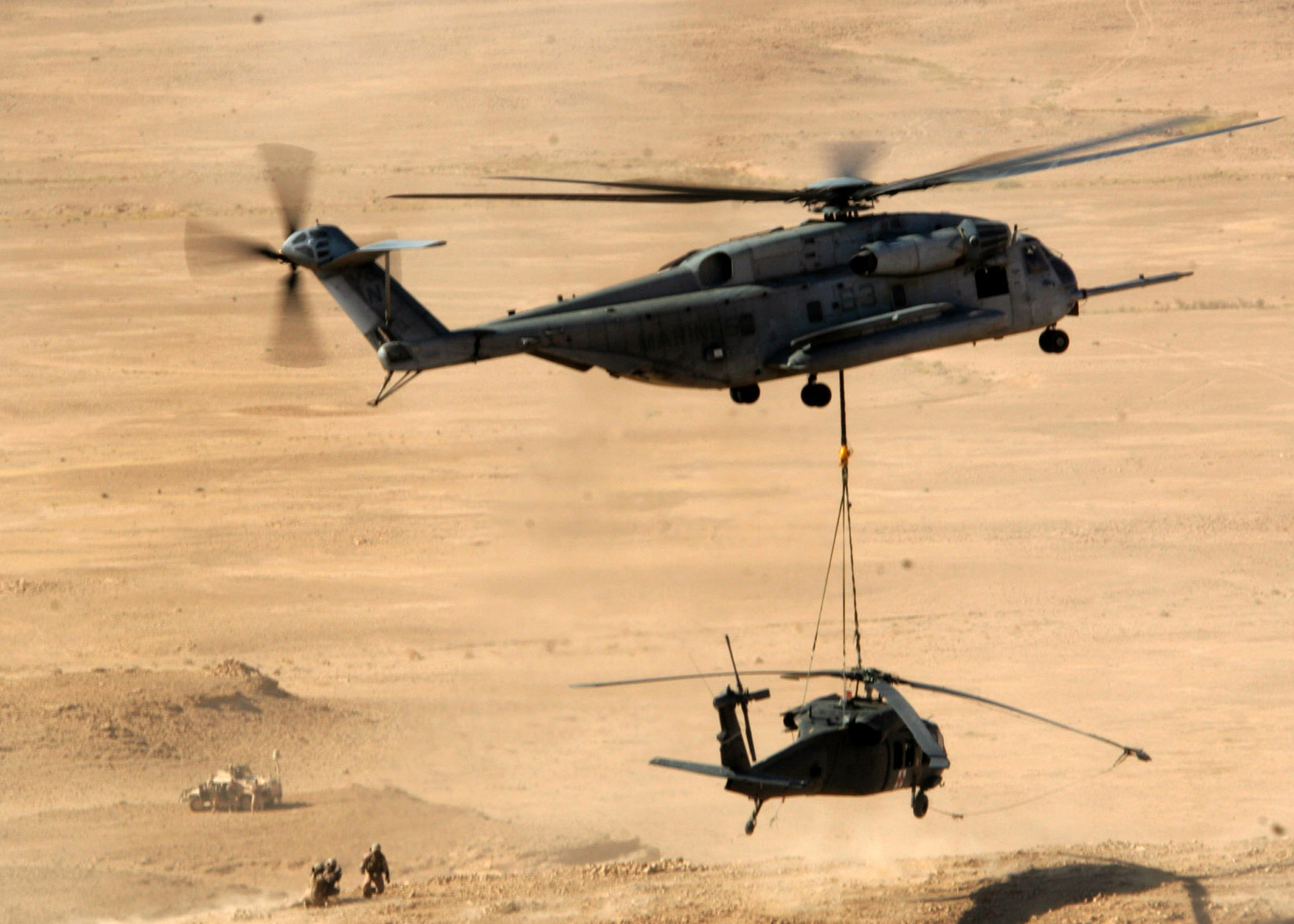
CH-53E Super Stallion lifts a disabled UH-60

Data from Encyclopedia of Modern Warplanes, International Directory, Tomajczyk, U.S. Army, Lockheed Martin brochure, GE T700-GE-701D brochure

General characteristics

- Crew: 2 pilots + 2 crew chiefs/gunners
- Capacity: 3,190 lb (1,450 kg) of cargo internally, including 11 seated troops or 6 stretchers, or 9,000 lb (4,100 kg) of cargo externally
- Length: 64 ft 10 in (19.76 m) including rotors
- Fuselage length: 50 ft 1 in (15.27 m)
- Width: 7 ft 9 in (2.36 m)
- Height: 16 ft 10 in (5.13 m)
- Empty weight: 12,511 lb (5,675 kg)
- Max takeoff weight: 22,000 lb (9,979 kg)
- Powerplant: 2 × General Electric T700-GE-701C/D turboshaft engines, 1,902 shp (1,418 kW) each
- Main rotor diameter: 53 ft 8 in (16.36 m)
- Main rotor area: 2,260 sq ft (210 m^{2})
- Blade section: root: Sikorsky SC2110; tip: Sikorsky SSC-A09

Performance

- Maximum speed: 159 kn (183 mph, 294 km/h)
- Cruise speed: 152 kn (175 mph, 282 km/h) maximum range at 18,000 lb
- Never exceed speed: 193 kn (222 mph, 357 km/h)
- Combat range: 320 nmi (370 mi, 590 km)
- Ferry range: 1,199 nmi (1,380 mi, 2,221 km) with ESSS stub wings and external tanks
- Service ceiling: 19,000 ft (5,800 m)
- Rate of climb: 1,646 ft/min (8.36 m/s)
- Disk loading: 7.19 lb/sq ft (35.1 kg/m^{2})
- Power/mass: 0.192 shp/lb (0.316 kW/kg)

Armament

- Guns:
  - 2 × 7.62 mm (0.30 in) M240 machine guns or
  - 2 × 7.62 mm (0.30 in) M134 minigun or
  - 2 × 12.7 mm (0.50 in) GAU-19 gatling guns
- Hardpoints: 4, 2 per ESSS stub wings , with provisions to carry combinations of:
  - Rockets: 70 mm (2.75 in) Hydra 70 unguided rockets in either a 7 tube (M260) or 19 tube (M261) pod.
  - Missiles: Up to 4x AGM-114 Hellfire laser guided air-to-ground missiles or 2x AIM-92 Stinger heat seeking air-to-air missiles per hardpoint. The Hellfire launcher rails can also be equipped with M260 (7 tube) Hydra pods.
  - Other: 7.62 mm (0.30 in), 12.7 mm (0.50 in), 20 mm (0.787 in), or 30 mm (1.18 in) M230 gun pods
- Bombs: Can be equipped with VOLCANO minefield dispersal system. See UH-60 Armament Subsystems for more information.

== See also ==
- Black Hawk Down – 2001 war film by Ridley Scott
- Future Long-Range Assault Aircraft - UH-60 replacement

Related development

- Sikorsky S-70 – (United States)
- Sikorsky HH-60 Pave Hawk – (United States)
- Sikorsky HH-60 Jayhawk – (United States)
- Sikorsky SH-60 Seahawk – (United States)
- Piasecki X-49 SpeedHawk – (United States)
- Sikorsky S-92 / Sikorsky CH-148 Cyclone – (United States)

Aircraft of comparable role, configuration, and era

- AgustaWestland AW149 – (Italy)
- Airbus Helicopters H175 – (France, China)
- Bell CH-146 Griffon – (United States, Canada)
- Bell UH-1 Iroquois – (United States)
- Bell UH-1N Twin Huey – (United States)
- Bell UH-1Y Venom – (United States)
- Bell 525 Relentless – (United States)
- Boeing Vertol YUH-61 – (United States)
- Denel Oryx – (South Africa)
- Eurocopter AS532 Cougar – (France)
- Harbin Z-20 – (China)
- KAI KUH-1 Surion – (South Korea)
- Mil Mi-8 – (Soviet Union)/Mil Mi-17 – (Soviet Union, Russia)
- NHIndustries NH90 – (France, Germany, Italy, Netherlands, Spain)

Related lists

- List of helicopters
- List of utility helicopters
- List of active military aircraft of the United States
- List of Sikorsky S-70 Models
- List of military electronics of the United States
