= Sobral Base =

Sobral Scientific Base Base de Avanzada Científica de Ejército Alférez de Fragata Sobral Base Científica Sobral Base Sobral
- Antarctic base
- Sub-Lieutenant Sobral Army Scientific Advanced Base
- Location within Antarctica
- Coordinates: 81°05′00″S 40°39′00″W
- Country: Argentina
- Province: Tierra del Fuego
- Department: Antártida Argentina
- Region: Filchner Ice Shelf
- Established: April 2, 1965
- Closed: October 28, 1968
- Named after: José María Sobral

Government
  - Type: Directorate
  - Body: Dirección Nacional del Antártico
  - Operator: Instituto Antártico Argentino
- Elevation: 1,000 m (3,300 ft)
- Time zone: UTC-3 (ART)
- Active times: All year-round until 1968, every summer since 2000
- Status: Inactive 1968–2000, active since 2000
- Facilities: List: Main house; Personnel house; Radio station; Power plant; Laboratory (meteorology, magnetometry, riometry); Deposits

Sobral Scientific Base (Spanish: Base de Avanzada Científica de Ejército Alférez de Fragata Sobral, or simply Base Científica Sobral or Base Sobral) was a permanent, all year-round and now only partially active Argentine Antarctic base and scientific research station named after Argentine polar explorer and scientist José María Sobral. It is located on the Filchner Ice Shelf.

== History ==
Sobral was founded with the goal of asserting Argentine sovereignty over the area while providing a launch platform for that year's planned land expedition to the South Pole.

The establishment of the base required over three months of continuous work done in a then barely-known region under extreme environmental circumstances. More than 40 t (39 long tons; 44 short tons) of equipment were transported by tractors over heavily cracked terrain that slowed and often halted the tracked vehicles and sleds. The settling team went across a total of 4,000 km (2,500 mi). A Cessna plane from Belgrano I provided route reconnaissance.

Sobral was founded on 2 April; just a day after, operation leader Captain Gustavo Adolfo Giró Tapper sent a radio message to Buenos Aires urging his superior command to speed up launching of the expedition to the South Pole so it could be carried out in the first days of October; he argued that the recently surveyed route between Belgrano I and the foothills of the polar plateau sector had very rough ice and, given the known instability of the Filchner Ice Shelf, the expeditionaires would find their path full of unknown obstacles. Thus, on 26 October 1965 a group of ten men left Belgrano I and a few days later arrived in Sobral, the last foothold before getting to the Pole, which they finally did on 10 December 1965. It was the first time in history that Earth's southernmost point was reached by land through the Weddell Sea.

By 1968 the slow drifting of the Filchner barrier was causing deep, often hidden crevices and structural stresses on the buildings. The base was thus closed on 28 October 1968 after three years of continuous service; it was quickly buried by falling snow. 15 years later, in November 1983, it was located and reopened by a six-men reconnaissance patrol after a 9-day trip traveling from Belgrano II on Ski-Doo bikes, with the mission of establishing a new connection route between both bases. The team performed maintenance, made meteorological measurements, and over 23 days surveyed the Diamond Mountains, a place never visited by humans before. After leaving written records in plastic tubes and having marked the base's placement with flags, they successfully returned to Belgrano II.

In 1997 another team reached the place but this time they could not find the buildings, covered under thicker ice. They left fuel tanks for future operations in the region.

On 10 October 2000 a six-men research expedition established a scientific camp at Sobral's emplacement and measured local ozone levels with a spectrophotometer. The temporary occupation was conducted by personnel belonging to Belgrano II and a technician from the National Antarctic Directorate; since then, a new expedition is sent every year between September and December, where the lowest annual average concentration of ozone in Antarctica is recorded.

In order to reach the remote base this team must travel for distances up to 400 km (250 mi) over very rugged ice terrain filled with numerous cracks, which pose an often unpredictable threat. Snowcat heavy vehicles are used to cover half of the route; light vehicles like the Yamaha VK-540 II Ski-Doo are preferred for the rest. The party carries all the necessary equipment for a three-months stay, such as tents, fuel, supplies, survival kits, communication hardware and scientific instruments.

== Description ==
Sobral is the southernmost Argentine base ever established: it is 420 km (260 mi) south of Belgrano I, less than 900 km (560 mi) distant from the South Pole,700 km (430 mi) from the Southern Ocean coastline, and 2,900 km (1,800 mi) from Ushuaia, the nearest port city.

Common tasks at the base include maintenance, logistic support for scientific projects, and search and rescue.

=== Scientific activities ===
Scientific research carried out at Sobral include meteorology, ionospheric observations and measurements of Earth's magnetic field. Stratospheric ozone data obtained at the base complements the spectrometer network located in Ushuaia, Marambio and Belgrano II.

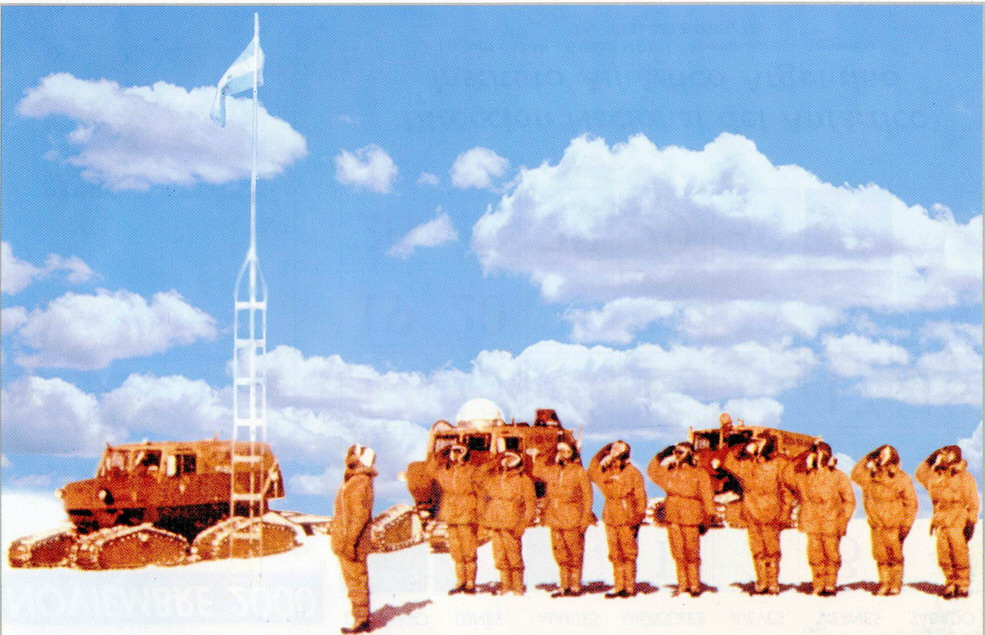
The 1965 Operación 90 team salutes the Flag of Argentina raised in the South Pole. It was the first time in history that the Pole was reached by land from the Weddell Sea; the last stage of the expedition was launched from Sobral

== Climate ==
Because of its high latitude and elevation of 1,000 m (3,300 ft) above sea level, climatic conditions in the area are extreme: air is very dry, winds often exceed 200 km/h (120 mph), atmospheric pressure is high and temperatures often fall below −60 °C (−76 °F)

The maximum registered temperature at Sobral was −17 °C (1 °F), and the minimum, −67.1 °C (−88.8 °F) on 14 April 1967.

== See also ==
- Argentine Antarctica
- Crime in Antarctica
- List of Antarctic research stations
- List of Antarctic field camps
