= Argentine Antarctica =

Argentine Antarctica Antártida Argentina
- Department
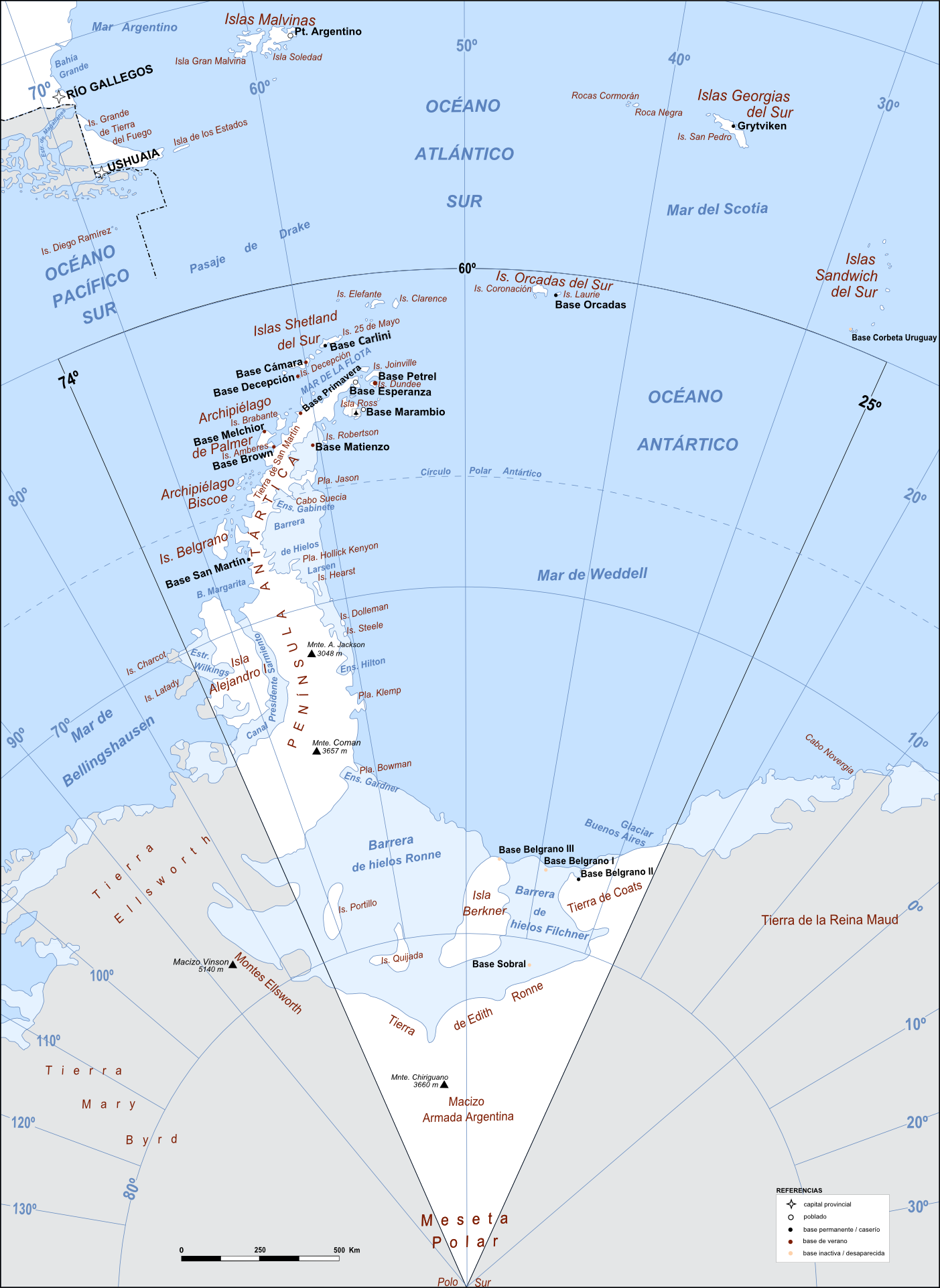
- Argentine Antarctica map since 1957. Orcadas base from 1904.

- Seal

- Location in Antarctica
- Country: Argentina
- Province: Tierra del Fuego, Antarctica and South Atlantic Islands
- First expedition: 1901–1904
- Founder: José María Sobral
- Largest city: Base Marambio

Government
  - Governor: Gustavo Melella

Area
  - Total: 1,461,597 km^{2} (564,326 sq mi)
  - Land: 965,597 km^{2} (372,819 sq mi)

Population (2010 Census)
  - Total: 469
  - Density: 0.000486/km^{2} (0.00126/sq mi)
- Demonym(s): antártico/a, fueguino/a
- Time zone: UTC-3
- Argentine Postal Code: 9411
- Area codes: 0054 + 02901; Esperanza and Marambio Stations: 0054 + 02964
- First base: Orcadas Base (1904)
- Number of bases: 13 bases (6 permanents and 7 seasonals); 64 others (huts, refuges, camps)
- Website: DNA.gov.ar

Argentine Antarctica (Spanish: Antártida Argentina or Sector Antártico Argentino) is an area on Antarctica claimed by Argentina as part of its national territory. It consists of the Antarctic Peninsula and a triangular section extending to the South Pole, delimited by the 25° West and 74° West meridians and the 60° South parallel. This region overlaps with British and Chilean claims in Antarctica. None of these claims have widespread international recognition.

Argentina's Antarctic claim is based on its presence on a base on Laurie Island in the South Orkney Islands since 1904, along with the area's proximity to the South American continent, and is subject to the Antarctic Treaty; however, the presence on the Antarctic mainland was established in 1951, and the official claim on the mainland was started to be formulated on 1941, with several changes and was officially declared on 1957. Administratively, Argentine Antarctica is a department of the province of Tierra del Fuego, Antarctica, and South Atlantic Islands. The provincial authorities are based in Ushuaia. Argentine activities in Antarctica are coordinated by the Instituto Antártico Argentino (IAA) and Argentine Antarctic Program.

The Argentine exploration of the continent started early in the 20th century. José María Sobral was the first Argentine to set foot on Antarctica in 1902, where he spent two seasons with the Swedish Antarctic Expedition of Otto Nordenskiöld. Shortly afterward, in 1904, the Orcadas Permanent Base was established. Years later, other permanent and seasonal bases were constructed. The first Argentine expedition to reach the South Pole was the 1965 Operación 90. The estimated area of Argentine Antarctica is 1,461,597 km^{2} (564,326 sq mi), of which 965,597 km^{2} (372,819 sq mi) is land. The ice of the glaciers over the territory's surface has an average thickness of 2 kilometres (1¼ miles). Temperatures fall in a typical range from 0 °C (32 °F) in summer to −60 °C (−76 °F) in winter, although in certain points the temperature may drop to as low as −82 °C (−115 °F) and may rise to 18 °C (65 °F).

Time zone UTC-3 is used in the area, as in Argentina. Argentina has six permanent Antarctic stations and seven summer stations. According to the Argentine national census as of October 2010, Argentine Antarctica had 230 inhabitants (including 9 families and 16 children) at six permanent bases: 75 at Marambio, 66 at Esperanza, 33 at Carlini, 20 at San Martín, 19 at Belgrano II, and 17 at Orcadas. Provisional results of the 2022 Argentine national census indicated 130 inhabitants for Argentine Antarctica. Residents take part in general elections within Tierra del Fuego Province.

== History ==
=== First expeditions ===
In 1815, Guillermo Brown, an Irish-born Argentine Marine Commodore serving in the naval forces of the United Provinces of the Río de la Plata, began a campaign to intercept the Spanish fleet in the Pacific Ocean. When they were crossing Cape Horn aboard the Hercules and Trinidad, strong winds pushed them to parallel 65° South. Brown claimed to have sighted Antarctic land on the expedition, saying that it is the reason why Argentine cartography often calls the northernmost part of the Antarctic Peninsula Tierra de la Trinidad.

A hut was built on Snow Hill Island in 1902. The Argentine Navy took possession of the hut in 1954 and named it Refugio Suecia. It is now an Argentine historical monument and historical site as mentioned by the Antarctic Treaty. The 1902 expedition built another hut in Hope Bay, which is also an Antarctic monument under the control of Esperanza Station.

=== Permanent occupation of South Orkney Islands since 1904 ===
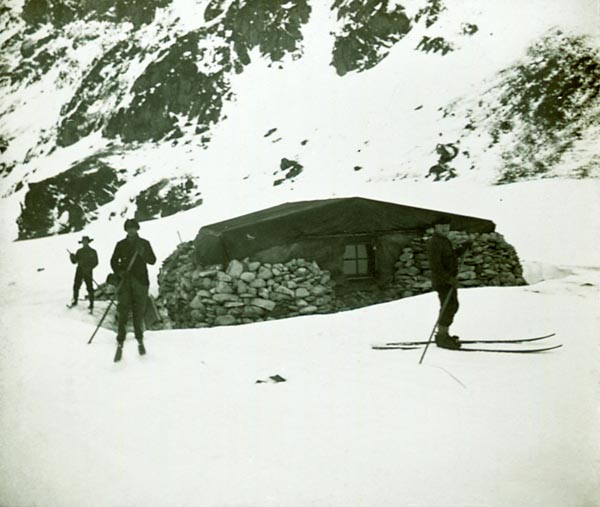
Omond House, Laurie Island, circa 1903.

On 2 January 1904, Argentina acquired a weather station installed by Scotsman William Speirs Bruce, in Laurie Island in the South Orkneys, where there had been a crew of six men making scientific observations. In it was a meteorological observatory, where he also worked. A post office was installed. On 22 February 1904, civilian (employee of the Argentine company official post and telegraph) Hugo Alberto Acuna noted the first time the flag of Argentina was officially raised on the Argentine Antarctic Sector. The observatory became the Orcadas Base, which is the oldest existing permanent human settlement in the Antarctic territory, an event commemorated in Argentina as the Day of the Argentine Antarctic.

The Argentine corvette ARA Uruguay returned to Antarctica in 1905 to take staff from the South Orkney and travel to Deception Island and Wiencke Island in search of Jean-Baptiste Charcot, whose French Antarctic Expedition (1903–1905) was believed to be lost. Because of the Argentine collaboration with his expedition, Charcot named an insular group as Argentine Islands. One of these islands was named Galindez Island in honor of the captain of the Corvette, Ismael Galíndez, and another was named Uruguay Island, in homage to the Argentine Corvette.

The Argentine Government established two meteorological observatories on South Georgia Island and Wandel Island. Two attempted expeditions to Wandel Island failed. In June 1905, the transport ARA Guardia Nacional, under the command of the Lieutenant Alfredo P. Lamas, established an observatory in Grytviken in Cumberland Bay, renamed in Spanish Bahía Guardia Nacional.

On 30 March 1927, the first radiotelegraph station in Antarctica was inaugurated on the South Orkney Islands.

=== Creation of the National Antarctic Commission in 1940 ===
In 1939, Argentina temporarily created the National Commission of the Antarctic by Decree No. 35821. On 30 April 1940, it became a permanent body by Decree No. 61852 in order to increase research in the area.

On 6 November 1940, Chile established the boundaries of its Antarctic claims by decree.

The Chilean Antarctic Territory or Antarctic Chilean Territory consists of all the lands, islands, islets, reefs, glaciers, and other known and unknown areas, as well as the respective territorial sea, within the limits of the ice cap defined by the meridians 53° and 90° west longitude from Greenwich.

Argentina formally protested the Chilean decree by a note dated 12 November 1940, rejecting its validity and expressing a potential claim to the same area. In turn, the United Kingdom protested on 25 February 1941.

By the end of 1940, Argentina and Chile mutually recognized "that Chile and Argentina have indisputable sovereignty rights in the polar region known as the American Antarctica".

=== Formulation of the Argentine claim to the Antarctic mainland since 1941 ===
The National Antarctic Commission establishment led to the definition of a claim on the Antarctic mainland. Argentina published a map in 1941 showing "the Antarctic Sector in which the Argentine Republic maintains rights" between 75° W and 25° W, south of 60° S, without a formal legal claim yet.

In January 1942, Argentina declared its Antarctic rights between the meridians at 25° (near the far east of the South Sandwich Islands) and 68° 34' W, south of 60° S, establishing the Argentine Antarctica, according to the theory of polar areas. (Note: Oscar Espinosa Moraga claims it was on the 68° 24' W meridian instead of 68° 34' W, being a direct projection from Punta Dúngeness, the southernmost point of mainland Argentina.)

On 8 November 1942, Argentina laid claim to Antarctic land when an expedition under the command of the captain Alberto J. Oddera placed a cylinder containing a report and a flag on Deception Island. In January 1943, the crew of the British ship HMS Carnarvon Castle removed the evidence of the Argentine inauguration and planted the British flag. On 5 March of the same year, the Argentine vessel ARA 1° de Mayo removed the British flag.

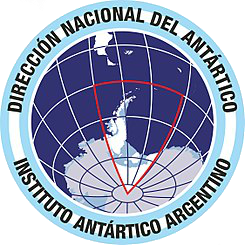
DNA-IAA emblem

On 2 September 1946, Decree No. 8944 required all the national maps to show the claimed territory of the Argentine Antarctic Sector, which was extended between the meridians at 25° and 74° west longitude, south of 60° S by the National Antarctic Commission.

On 18 February 1948, the Chilean President Gabriel Gonzalez Videla personally opened Base General Bernardo O'Higgins Riquelme on the Antarctic Peninsula. This was the first official visit of a head of state to Antarctica.

On 4 March 1948, Chile and Argentina signed a mutual agreement protecting and defending legal rights of the territorial Antarctic, mutually recognizing their claims. There were minor agreements between both countries in 1952 and 1953.

On 28 February 1957, Decree-Law No. 2129 repeated the claim between the meridians at 25° and 74° West and the parallel 60° South latitude. The claimed territory is overlapped in part by the British (20°W to 80°W) and the earlier Chilean (53°W to 90°W) claims.

=== Presence in the Antarctic Peninsula since 1951 ===
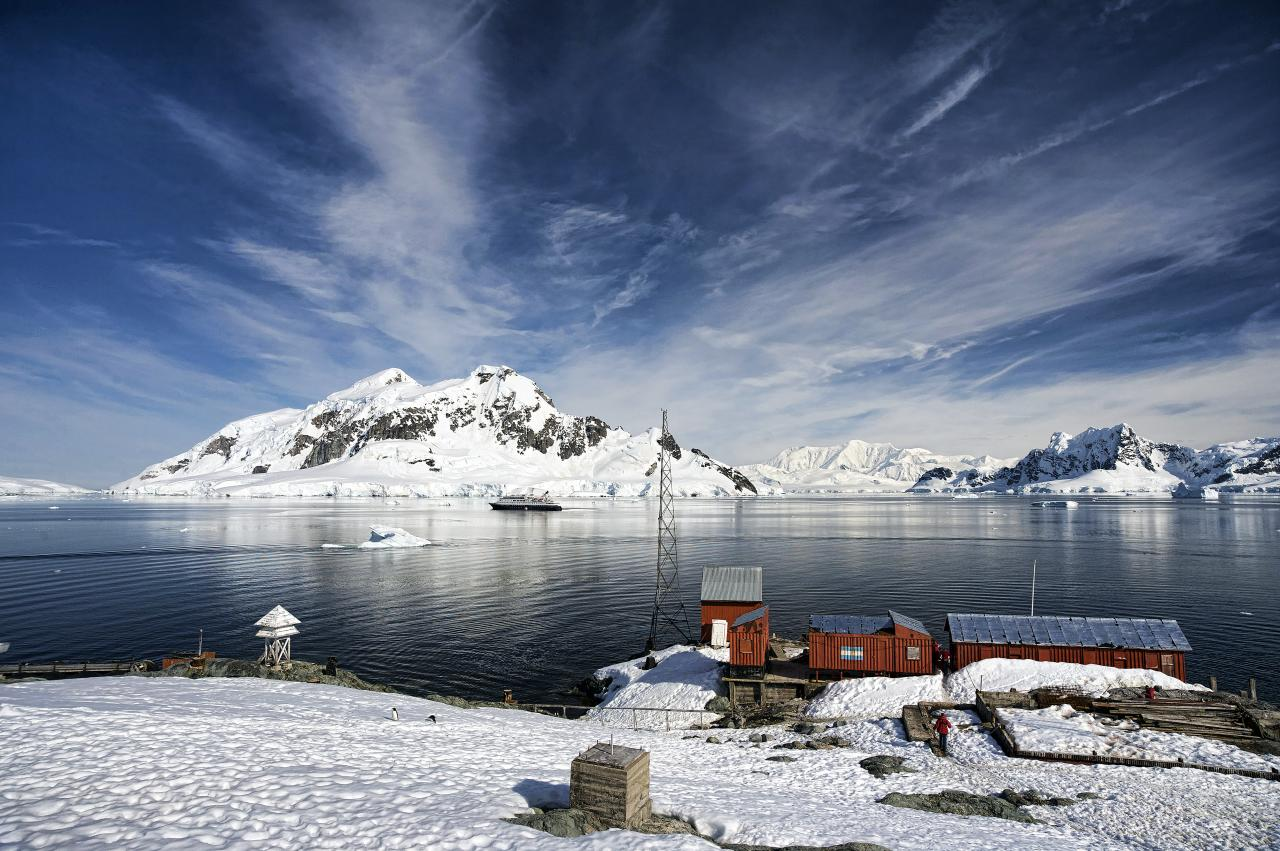
The Brown Station established 6 April 1951 is the first Argentinian base on the Antarctic mainland.

The first continental Argentine base in Antarctica, the Almirante Brown Naval detachment, was opened in 1951. The following year, the Esperanza Naval detachment (now Esperanza Base) opened. On 1 February 1952, while building the Esperanza Base at Hope Bay, the first shooting war in Antarctica occurred when an Argentine team fired a machine gun over the heads of a civil team of British Falkland Islands Dependencies Survey workers and forced them to withdraw to their ship, the John Biscoe.

On 17 January 1953, at Deception Island, the Refugio Teniente Lasala (a hut and a tent) was opened by the staff of the Argentine ship ARA Chiriguano. On 15 February 32 Royal Marines of the British frigate HMS Snipe, armed with Sten submachine guns, rifles, and tear gas, captured two Argentine sailors. The Argentine refuge and a nearby uninhabited Chilean hut were destroyed. The Argentine sailors were delivered on a British vessel to South Georgia on 18 February. A British detachment stayed three months on the island while the frigate patrolled the waters until April.

On 4 May 1955, the United Kingdom filed two lawsuits against Argentina and Chile respectively, in the International Court of Justice in The Hague to declare Argentine and Chilean claims on the Antarctic and sub-Antarctic areas invalid. On 15 July 1955, the Chilean Government rejected the jurisdiction of the Court in that case, and on 1 August, the Argentine Government did the same.

=== Signing of the Antarctic Treaty ===
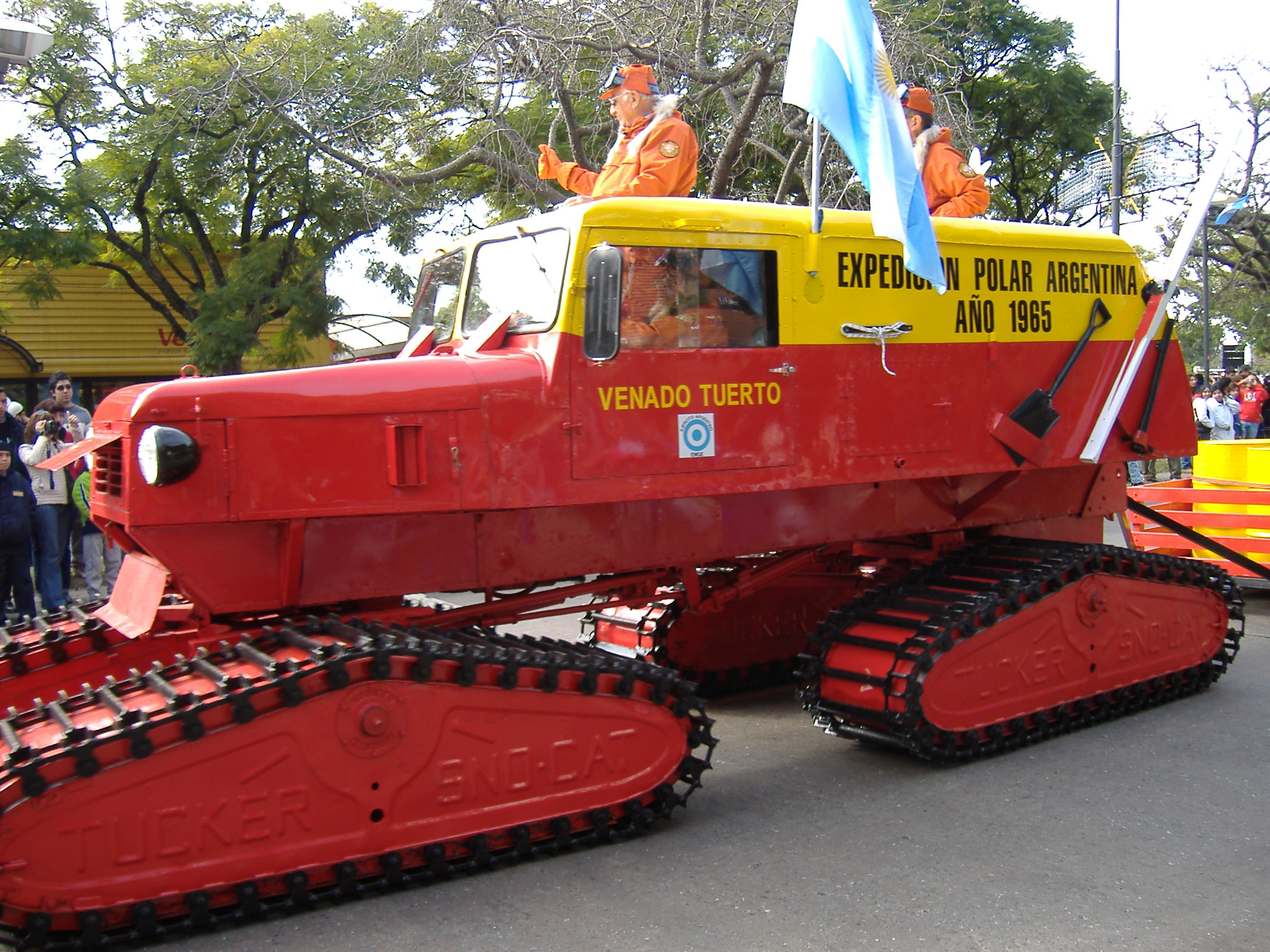
A caterpillar tractor (a Tucker Sno-Cat) from the first Argentine expedition that reached the South Pole in 1965.

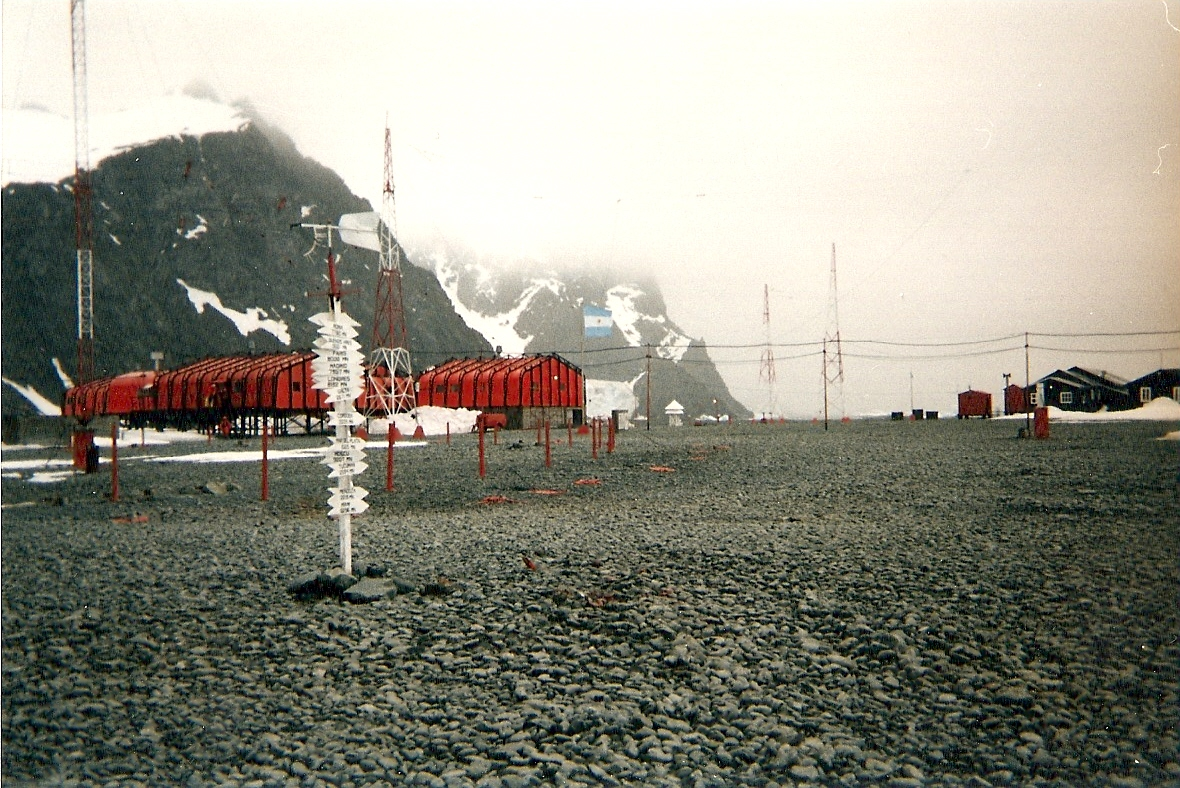
The Orcadas Base in 1996

On 1 December 1959, the Antarctic Treaty was signed, entering into force on 23 June 1961.

Operación 90 was the first Argentine ground expedition to the South Pole. It was conducted in 1965 by ten soldiers of the Argentine Army under then-Colonel Jorge Edgard Leal. The operation was named for the target 90 degree South latitude point (the geographic South Pole).

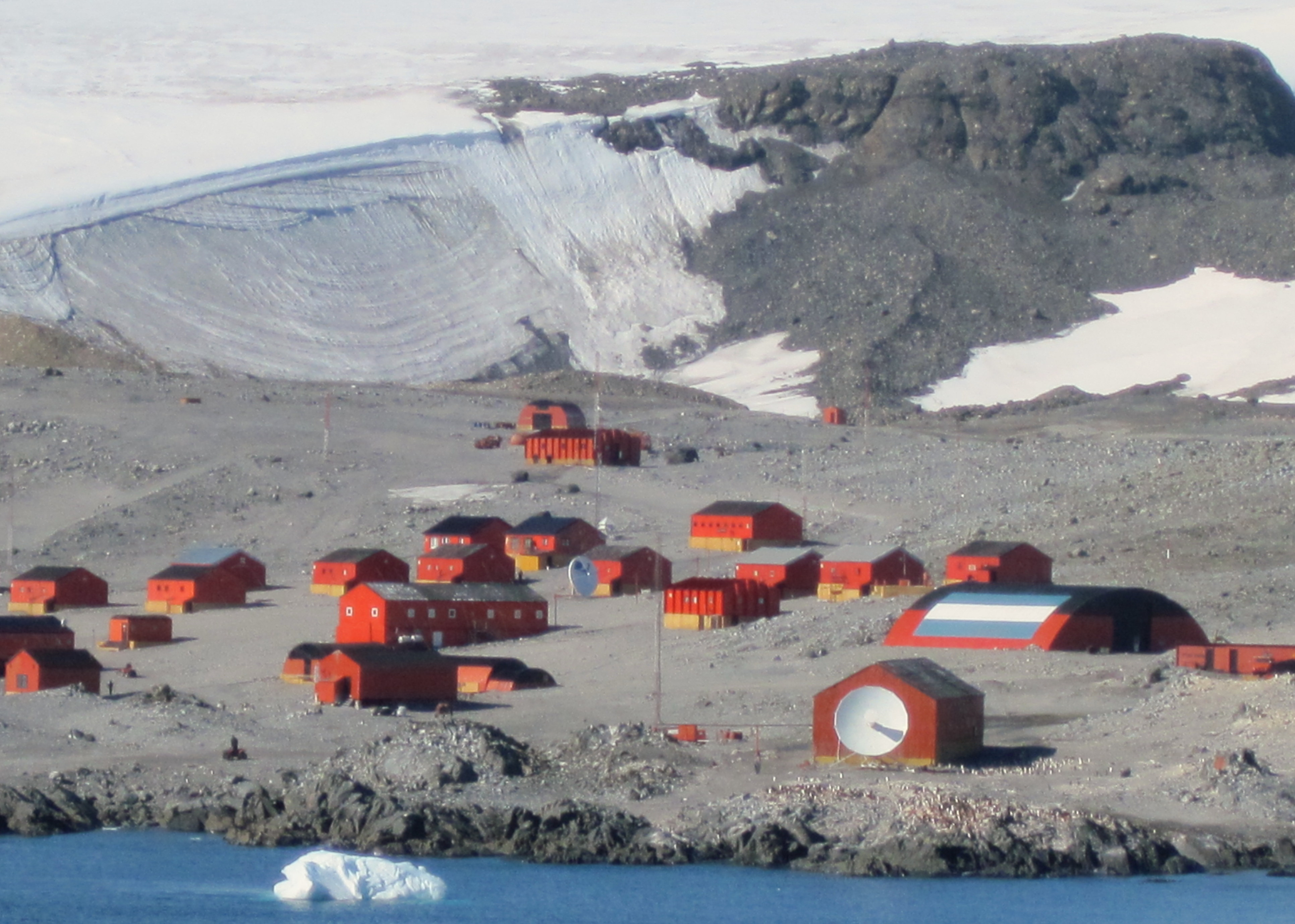
Esperanza Base on Trinity Peninsula in 2012.

On 8 April 1970, the Governor of Tierra del Fuego issued Decree No. 149 creating four new departments, among them the Argentine Antarctic Sector Department.

In 1977, the Esperanza Base was chosen to house Argentine families that spent their winters in Antarctica. The first director of the Argentine Antarctic Institute, general Hernán Pujato, was the forerunner of the installation of the Fortín Sargento Cabral. On 13 August 1954, he proposed that the Argentine government create homes near Esperanza Base to populate with families with a goal of strengthening Argentine rights in that part of Antarctica. After finishing the construction of the houses, the Fortín Sargento Cabral was established on 17 February 1978 with five houses.

The first documented person born on the Antarctic continent was the Argentine Emilio Palma at Esperanza Base in 1978, who was a citizen of the United Kingdom and Colonies (CUKC) at birth. His baptism in the Catholic chapel on 7 January 1978 was the first documented baptism on the continent.

On 18 December 2012, the Foreign & Commonwealth Office of the United Kingdom announced that the southern part of the British Antarctic Territory (which included a portion of Argentine Antarctica) would be named Queen Elizabeth Land in honor of Queen Elizabeth II. Argentina opposed Britain's decision to rename the area.

In 2013, the Argentine Defense Ministry announced that Petrel Base would become a permanent base by 2015. The base will have an airport and facilities to transfer passengers and cargo.

== Geography ==
Location in Antarctica

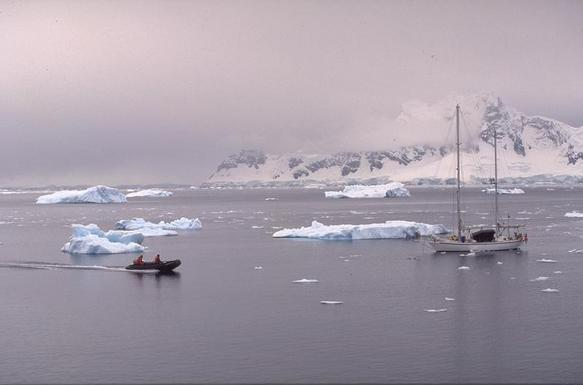
Watercraft in Hope Bay, Antarctica.

The geographic structure of Argentine Antarctica shares some features with Patagonia, located to the north. The highest peaks are located at the south of the Antarctic Peninsula, which has islands and archipelagos nearby. The land is under an ice sheet.

=== Climate ===
The climate of the region ranges from a subpolar climate in the north to a polar climate in the south. The region has an extremely cold climate, with mean temperatures below 0 °C (32 °F) with frost and snowfall occurring throughout the year. In general, there are two different climatic zones found within the region: a glacial climate in the interior and an oceanic one in the Antarctic Peninsula and adjacent islands. The glacial climate found in the interior is dominated by continental ice sheets and glaciers, while in the Antarctic Peninsula and its adjacent islands, the climate is characterized by very strong winds, particularly in winter. In particular, the Antarctic Peninsula experiences strong cold winds and blizzards. In the interior of the continent, the climate is colder and drier due to the higher latitude, altitude, and strong continental influences. Mean annual temperatures range from −10 to −20 °C (14 to −4 °F) in the Antarctic Peninsula to −30 to −50 °C (−22 to −58 °F) in the interior. Temperatures are always low in the region; during the polar night in winter, temperatures drop to −42 °C (−44 °F). In the warmest month, mean temperatures are usually below 0 °C (32 °F). Coastal areas have mean temperatures in the warmest month at around freezing. Precipitation mainly falls as snow. Due to the ice sheets and glaciers covering most of the region and the severity of the climate, the flora is sparse and limited only to coastal areas.

Average Temperatures in selected locations in °C (°F)
	Jan	Feb	Mar	Apr	May	Jun	Jul	Aug	Sept	Oct	Nov	Dec	Annual
Orcadas Base	1.4 (34.5)	1.4 (34.5)	0.4 (32.7)	−1.8 (28.8)	−4.6 (23.7)	−7.9 (17.8)	−9.3 (15.3)	−7.8 (18.0)	−5.4 (22.3)	−2.8 (27.0)	−0.7 (30.7)	0.6 (33.1)	−3.0 (26.6)
Esperanza Base	1.4 (34.5)	0.7 (33.3)	−2.3 (27.9)	−6.1 (21.0)	−8.2 (17.2)	−10.4 (13.3)	−10.5 (13.1)	−9.0 (15.8)	−6.5 (20.3)	−4.3 (24.3)	−1.1 (30.0)	0.8 (33.4)	−4.6 (23.7)
Marambio Base	−0.8 (30.6)	−2.0 (28.4)	−6.1 (21.0)	−10.8 (12.6)	−12.8 (9.0)	−14.7 (5.5)	−14.7 (5.5)	−13.1 (8.4)	−10.1 (13.8)	−7.6 (18.3)	−3.6 (25.5)	−1.2 (29.8)	−8.1 (17.4)
San Martín Base	2.0 (35.6)	0.9 (33.6)	−1.2 (29.8)	−3.3 (26.1)	−5.3 (22.5)	−9.3 (15.3)	−11.6 (11.1)	−11.5 (11.3)	−8.9 (16.0)	−5.9 (21.4)	−2.0 (28.4)	0.8 (33.4)	−4.6 (23.7)
Belgrano II Base	−2.4 (27.7)	−7.0 (19.4)	−12.0 (10.4)	−16.7 (1.9)	−18.1 (−0.6)	−19.1 (−2.4)	−20.4 (−4.7)	−20.2 (−4.4)	−18.4 (−1.1)	−14.8 (5.4)	−8.0 (17.6)	−3.0 (26.6)	−13.3 (8.1)

Average Precipitation in selected locations in mm (in)
	Jan	Feb	Mar	Apr	May	Jun	Jul	Aug	Sept	Oct	Nov	Dec	Annual
Orcadas Base	136.9 (5.39)	143.2 (5.64)	169.4 (6.67)	121.2 (4.77)	108.0 (4.25)	81.5 (3.21)	77.5 (3.05)	94.5 (3.72)	85.6 (3.37)	89.1 (3.51)	91.9 (3.62)	109.7 (4.32)	1,308.5 (51.52)
Esperanza Base	38.0 (1.50)	49.9 (1.96)	72.8 (2.87)	49.0 (1.93)	47.7 (1.88)	39.3 (1.55)	40.3 (1.59)	47.4 (1.87)	49.6 (1.95)	50.4 (1.98)	51.0 (2.01)	39.4 (1.55)	574.8 (22.63)
Marambio Base	44.4 (1.75)	55.1 (2.17)	51.5 (2.03)	26.1 (1.03)	24.6 (0.97)	13.9 (0.55)	17.8 (0.70)	17.6 (0.69)	30.7 (1.21)	18.1 (0.71)	28.0 (1.10)	35.0 (1.38)	362.8 (14.28)
San Martín Base	13.8 (0.54)	46.5 (1.83)	48.3 (1.90)	33.1 (1.30)	34.4 (1.35)	28.0 (1.10)	39.4 (1.55)	36.4 (1.43)	40.9 (1.61)	32.2 (1.27)	30.4 (1.20)	27.0 (1.06)	410.4 (16.16)
Belgrano II Base	26.2 (1.03)	27.4 (1.08)	32.5 (1.28)	16.8 (0.66)	22.5 (0.89)	25.0 (0.98)	27.8 (1.09)	26.9 (1.06)	39.0 (1.54)	20.2 (0.80)	18.2 (0.72)	17.0 (0.67)	299.5 (11.79)

== Symbols ==
The flag of Tierra del Fuego

The flag of Tierra del Fuego, which includes Argentine Antarctica, was adopted in 1999 as the result of a competition. It is a diagonal bicolor flag of sky blue and orange with a white albatross dividing the flag diagonally and the Southern Cross constellation in the blue upper half. The orange represents the fire in the province's name, while the blue represents the sky and reflects the color of the national flag.

== Argentine bases ==
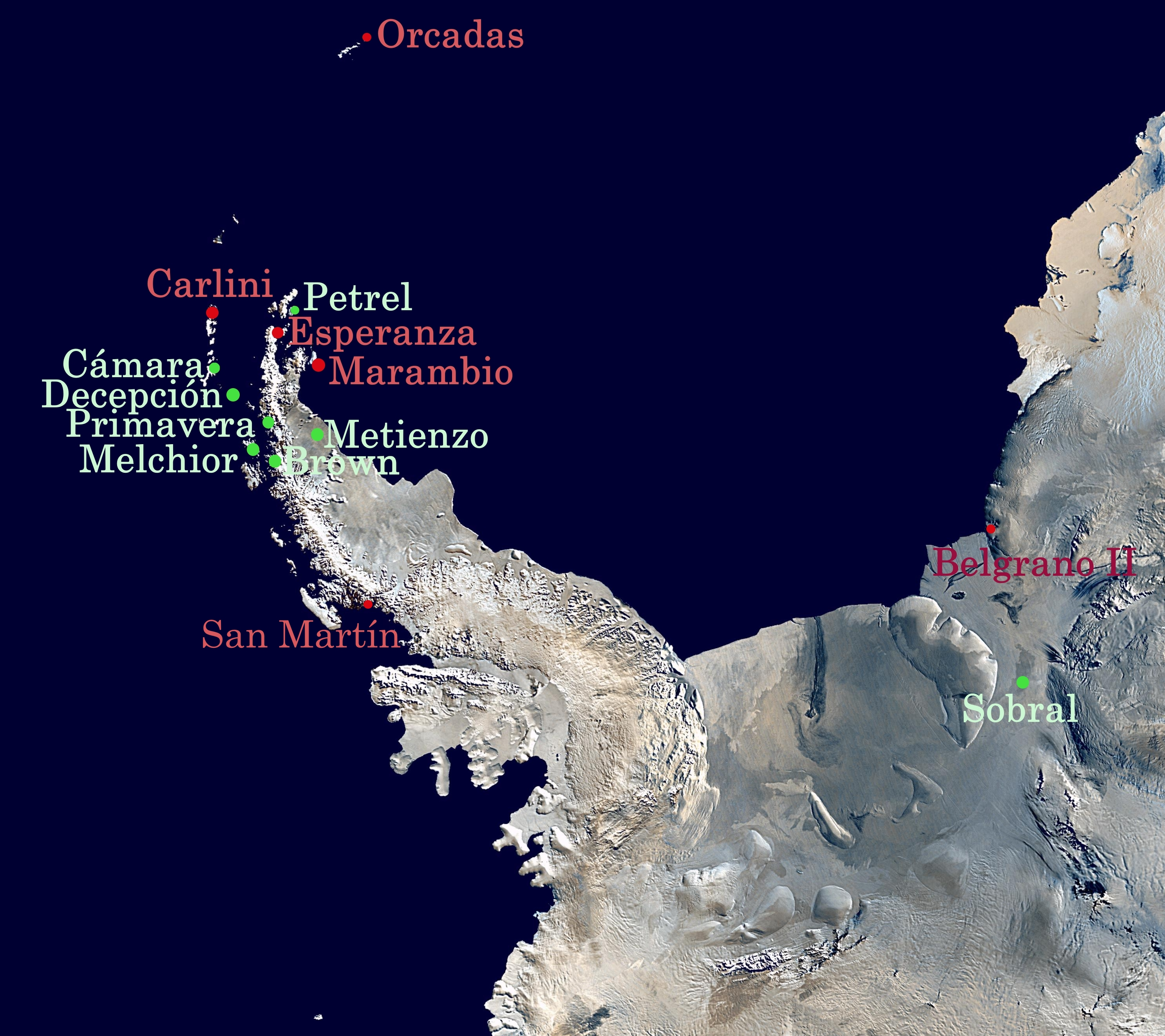
Argentine bases on Antarctica (permanent bases in red).

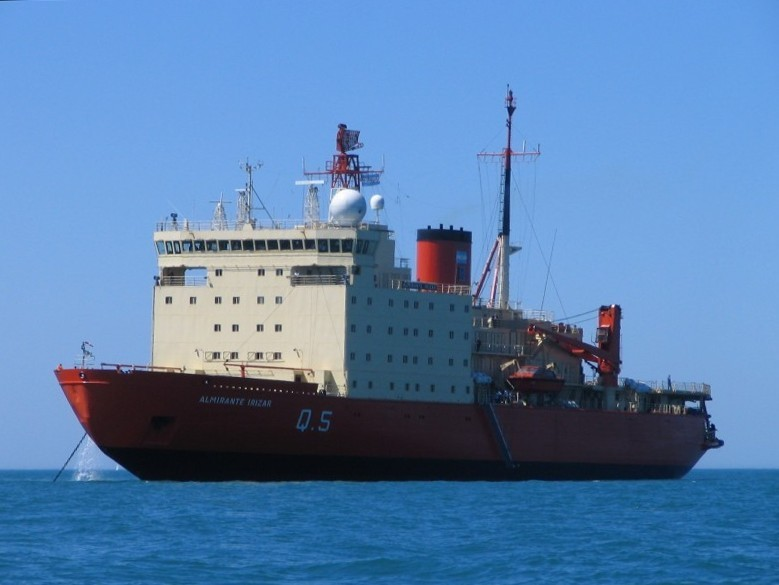
The icebreaker Almirante Irizar, the principal supply line for Argentine bases in Antarctica since 1978.

Esperanza and Marambio are the largest Argentine bases, together holding 70 buildings, with a combined occupancy rate ranging from roughly 110 in winter to 250 in summer. Orcadas Base on the South Orkney Islands is the world's first Antarctic base, operating continuously since 1903. The southernmost Argentine permanent base is Belgrano II, at around 77 latitudinal degrees south. The southernmost summer base is Sobral, 1,450 km (901 mi) from Belgrano II.

The bases are supplied by ships as well as by C-130 Hercules and DHC-6 Twin Otter aircraft.

The Argentine Navy devotes resources to its annual Antarctic missions. In 2022/23, the auxiliary vessels Puerto Argentino and Estrecho San Carlos were tasked to the mission, along with the icebreaker Almirante Irízar. These vessels were supported by Argentine Navy Sea King helicopters.

As of mid-2023, Argentina was in discussions with Finland to build a new polar logistics vessel, the "ARC 133". The ship is to be a Polar 4 class vessel (year-round operation in thick first-year ice, which may include old ice inclusions) and is envisaged for completion by the latter 2020s.

=== Permanent bases ===
- Belgrano II (77°52′S 34°37′W), laboratory and meteorological station; southernmost Argentine base (since 1979)
- Belgrano III (77°54′02″S 45°47′01″W) (closed)
- Esperanza (63°24′S 57°00′W), Hope Bay
  - Laboratory and meteorological station (since 1952)
  - Radio LRA36 Nacional Arcángel San Gabriel, School #38 Presidente Raúl Ricardo Alfonsín (since 1978)
  - Catholic Chapel, Post, Gym, Civil registration, port, tourist facilities
- Carlini (62°14′S 58°40′W), scientific station at King George Island
- Marambio Base Station (64°14′S 56°37′W), Seymour-Marambio Island
  - Laboratory, meteorological station
  - Airport, 1.2 km (¾ mile) long, 30 metre (100 foot) wide runway (since 1969) (Website)
- Orcadas Base (60°44′S 44°44′W), South Orkney Islands (since 1903)
- San Martín Base (68°08′S 67°06′W), laboratory and meteorological station (since 1951)

=== Seasonal bases ===
- Teniente Camara Base (1957) 62°02′S 58°42′W, Livingston Island
- Base Deception (1948) 62°52′S 60°43′W, Deception Island
- Petrel Air Station (1967) 63°28′S 56°17′W Dundee Island
- Base Primavera (1977) 64°09′S 60°57′W, Alexander Island
- Base Melchior (1947) 64°20′S 62°59′W Anvers Island
- Almirante Brown Base (1951) 64°53′S 62°53′W, Paradise Bay
- Teniente Matienzo Base (1961) 64°58′S 60°04′W, Larsen Nunatak

=== Camps, huts and other establishments ===
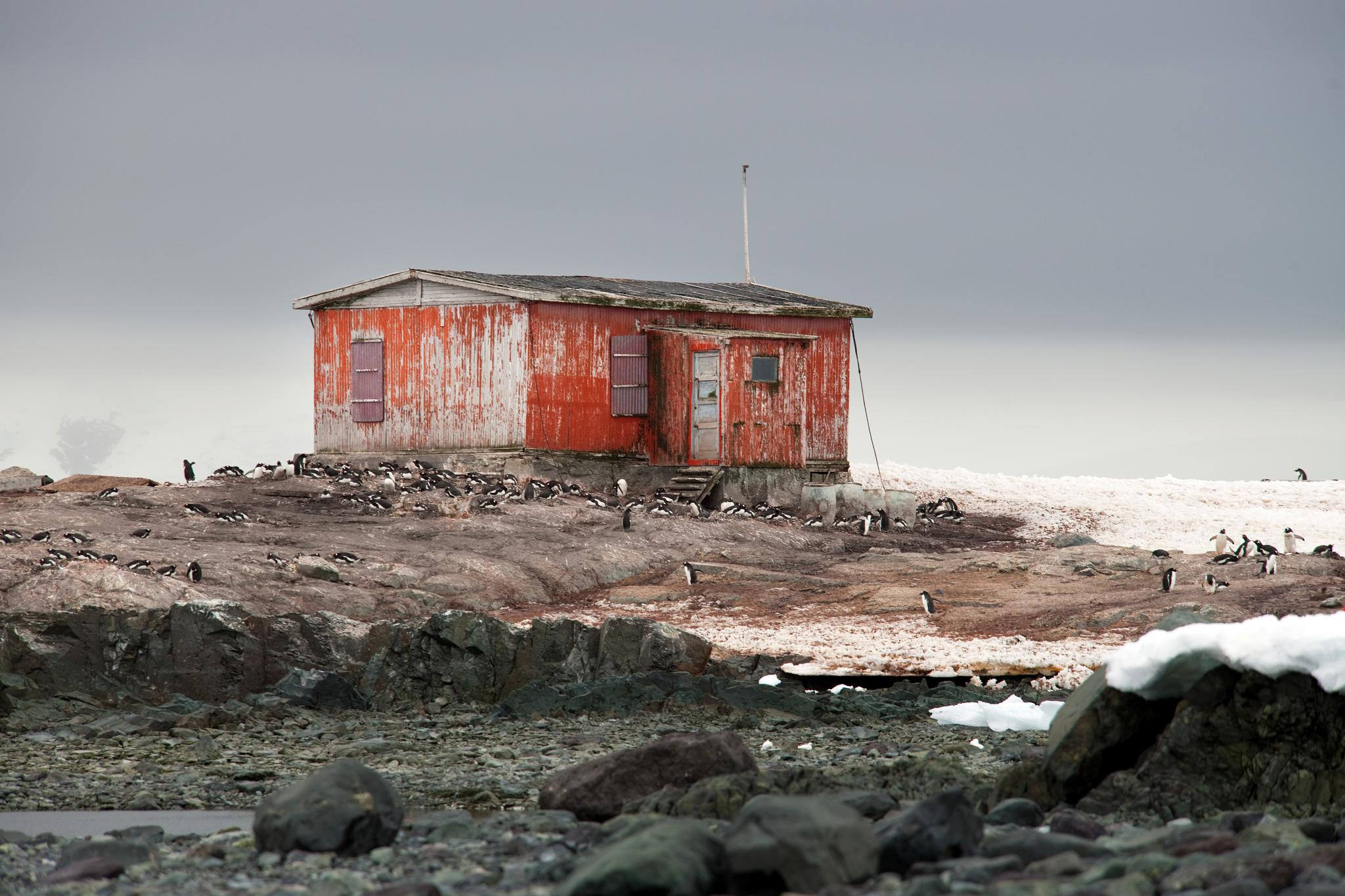
Groussac hut on Petermann Island

There are 64 other establishments in Argentine Antarctica.

- Base Alférez de Navío Sobral (1965) 81°05′S 40°00′W, Edith Ronne Land (closed)
- Estación Científica Ellsworth (ex US) (1958) 77°45′S 41°00′W, Weddell Sea (closed)
- Refuge Francisco de Gurruchaga 62°15′S 59°00′W, Nelson Island (open as hut)
- Base Ballvé 62°12′36″S 58°56′03″W, King George Island (open as hut)
- Belgrano I Base 77°47′S 38°15′W, Filchner-Ronne Ice Shelf (closed)
- Belgrano III Base 77°54′02″S 45°47′01″W, Filchner-Ronne Ice Shelf (closed)
- Camp Livingston 62°39′22″S 61°00′39″W, Byers Peninsula, Livingston Island
- Refugio Suecia 63°22′S 56°59′W, Snow Hill Island (built in February 1902 by the Swedish South Polar Expedition)
- Refuge Abrazo de Maipú 63°20′45″S 57°33′12″W, Trinity Peninsula (administered between Chile and Argentina)

Argentina's claim to the Antarctic Peninsula overlaps with the Antarctic claims of Chile, 53°W to 90°W, and the UK claims, 20°W to 80°W.

Currently, there are no attempts by Argentina or any other country to enforce territorial claims in Antarctica. See List of Antarctic territorial claims.

None of these claims have widespread international recognition.

== Demographics ==
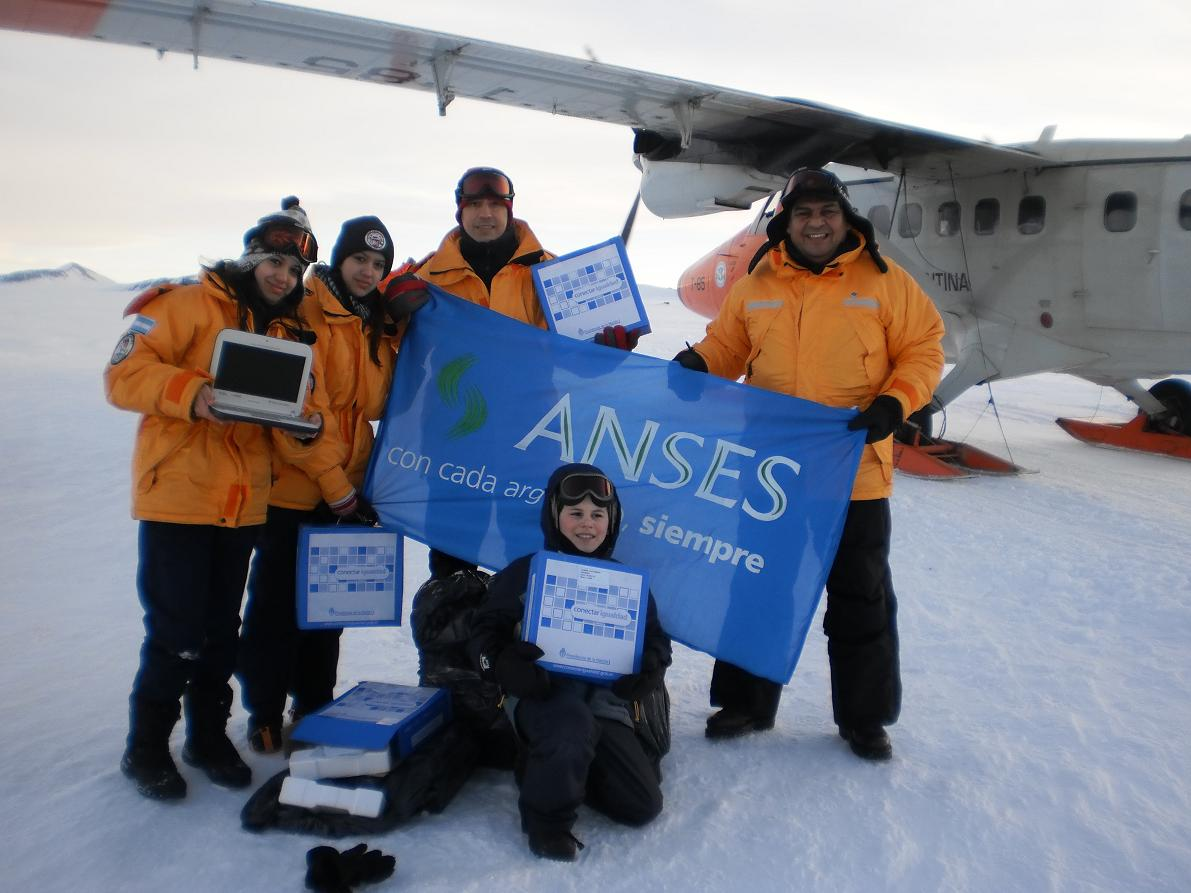
Children, teenagers and teachers of the school of Esperanza Base

In 1978, the first Antarctic baby was born in the Fortín Sargento Cabral at the Esperanza Base. He was named Emilio Palma. María de las Nieves Delgado was the first Antarctic girl, born on 27 March 1978 at Esperanza Base. By 1980, six more children were born at the base: Rubén Eduardo de Carli (21 September 1979), Francisco Javier Sosa (21 September 1979), Silvina Analía Arnouil (14 January 1980), José Manuel Valladares Solís (24 January 1980), Lucas Daniel Posse (4 February 1980) and María Sol Cosenza (3 May 1983). The base has an Argentine civil registry office where there have been births and weddings.

In 1991, there were 142 permanent residents, including 19 minors. These residents are families that live in Antarctica or scientists that have lived there for more than two years. There were 121 men and 21 women that lived mostly near Esperanza and other bases. As of 1998–1999, Argentine Antarctica had a winter population of 165.

== See also ==
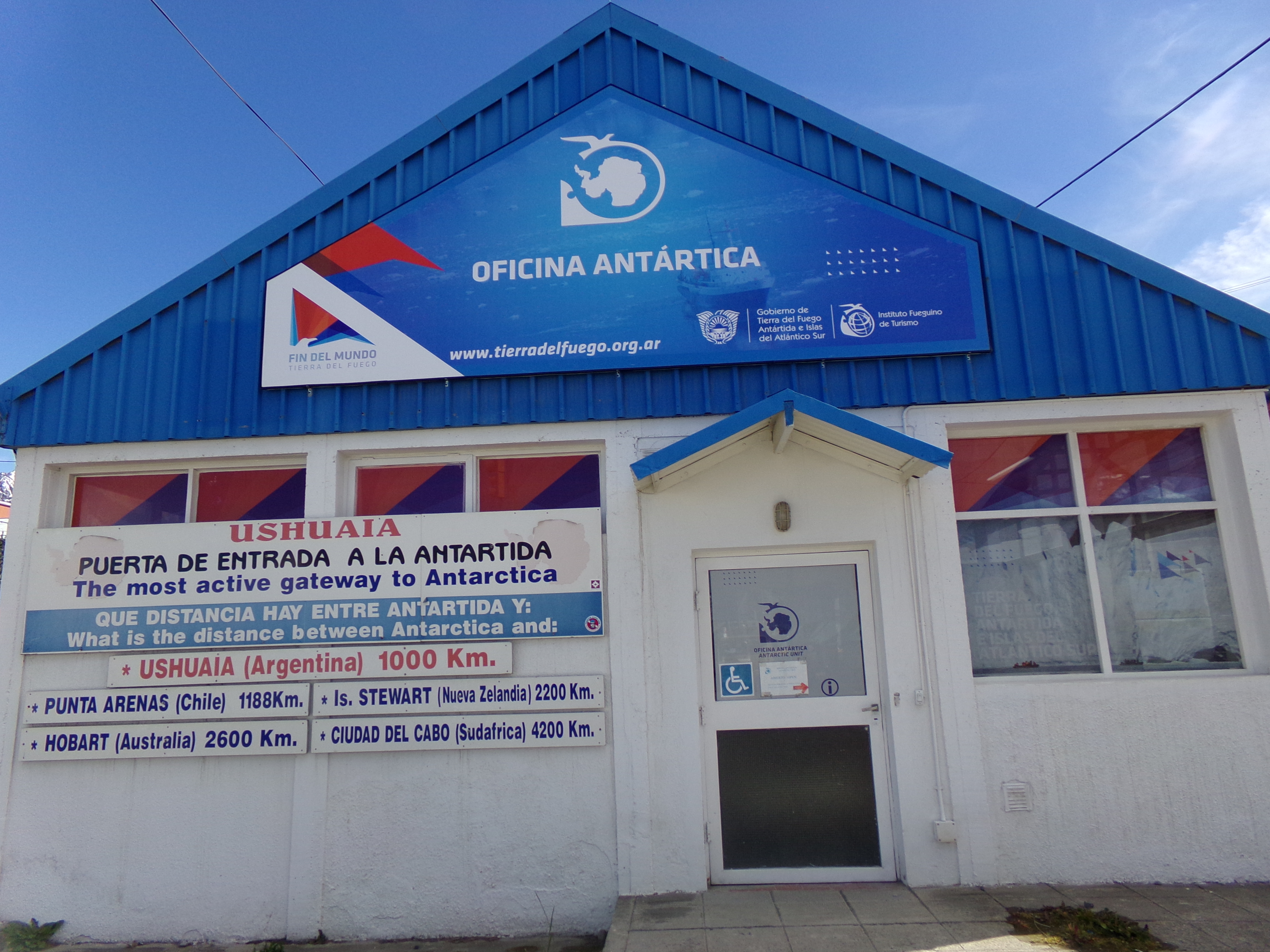
Antarctic office in Ushuaia

- Argentine actions in Antarctica
- Australian Antarctic Territory
- List of Antarctic territorial claims
- Ross Dependency

== Bibliography ==
- Menutti, Adela; Menutti, María (1980). Geografía Argentina y Universal (in Spanish). Buenos Aires: Edil.
- Pinochet de la Barra, Óscar (1987). "Negociaciones antárticas de Chile en un mundo cambiante". Estudios Internacionales. 20 (78): 210–22. doi:10.5354/0719-3769.1987.15737.
