= Terrada Point =

Terrada Point (64°23′S 62°14′W) is the northeast entrance point to Buls Bay, Brabant Island, in the Palmer Archipelago. The point was roughly mapped by the Belgian Antarctic Expedition, 1897–99. It was mapped in detail in 1954 by an Argentine Antarctic Expedition and, in 1978, named "Cabo Terrada" after an Argentine patriot. The term point is appropriate and replaces "cabo" (cape) in the approved name.
