= Belgrano III Base =

Belgrano III Base Base Belgrano III
- Antarctic research station
- Location in Antarctica
- Coordinates: 77°54′02″S 45°47′01″W
- Region: Filchner Ice Shelf
- Location: Berkner Island
- Established: 30 January 1980
- Evacuated: 15 January 1984
- Named for: Manuel Belgrano

Government
  - Type: Administration
  - Body: Instituto Antártico Argentino
- Elevation: 510 m (1,670 ft)
- Time zone: UTC-3 (ART)
- Active times: All year-round
- Facilities: List: Main house; Infirmary; Radio station; Power plant; Meteorology lab; Deposits

Belgrano III Base (Spanish: Base Belgrano III) was a permanent, all year-round Argentine Antarctic base and scientific research station named after General Manuel Belgrano, one of the Libertadores and the creator of the Argentine Flag. It was located on Berkner Island on the Filchner Ice Shelf.

At the time of its inauguration it was Argentina's southernmost permanent base. It was shut down in 1984 over safety concerns due to it being built on increasingly unstable ice, which endangered both personnel and equipment.

== History ==
On 8 January 1980, launching the second stage of the 1979–80 austral summer campaign, the Argentine Navy's new icebreaker ARA Almirante Irízar sailed away from Buenos Aires with the mission of founding a new base on Berkner Island, on the Filchner Ice Shelf.

On 24 January 1980 and after a sixteen-day-long trip, the ship reached the chosen place, about 200 km (120 mi) west of the spot occupied by Belgrano I, by then already abandoned because the ice platform it was placed upon was cracking at a fast rate, resulting in unsafe working conditions.

Belgrano III was officially inaugurated on 30 January after finishing unloading of cargo with the aid of two Puma SA 330 helicopters from the Argentine Army Aviation Command. At this time it hosted a nine-man Argentine Army complement.

Belgrano III was shut down after 4 years of continuous service due to the fast deterioration of the ice barrier it was sitting on; new, often hidden cracks and crevices endangered the on-duty personnel and material. The base was closed on 15 January 1984 and all of its staff was evacuated by a helicopter operating from Almirante Irízar. Due to a mix of very bad weather and mechanical failure of the second helicopter aboard Almirante Irízar, 33 t (32 long tons; 36 short tons) of packaged equipment had to be left behind to be recovered by land or, if not possible, in a later summer campaign. The salvage of such equipment was further delayed for several campaigns because of unusual pack ice thickness and other transport and logistic setbacks. In 1989 a helicopter inspection showed that the base and packages were already completely buried in snow and ice 4–5 m (13–16 ft) deep; only the antennae were sticking out of the surface.

== Description ==
The initial facilities at Belgrano III were composed of nine mobile modules coupled together and mounted on continuous tracks. They were constructed of plastic material, which provided structural strength and thermal insulation at the same time, necessary features to withstand the rigorous winds and freezing temperatures prevailing in the area. In addition the base had a cubicle mounted on skis. These facilities were assigned to staff accommodation, communications station, infirmary, meteorological station, kitchen, bathroom and power plant.

A freezing chamber was built in the ice, and some deposits were installed directly on the ground.

=== Scientific activities ===
Besides the usual equipment and facility maintenance duties, personnel at Belgrano III carried out various scientific projects regarding meteorology, geomagnetism and topographic surveys of the area.

== See also ==
- Argentine Antarctica
- List of Antarctic research stations
- List of Antarctic field camps
