= Belgrano I Base =

Belgrano I Base Base Belgrano I
- Antarctic research station
- Last location in Antarctica
- Coordinates: 77°43′00″S 38°04′00″W
- Region: Filchner Ice Shelf
- Location: Piedrabuena Bay
- Established: 18 January 1955
- Evacuated: January 1980
- Named for: Manuel Belgrano

Government
  - Type: Administration
  - Body: Instituto Antártico Argentino
- Elevation: 32 m (105 ft)
- Time zone: UTC-3 (ART)
- Active times: All year-round
- Facilities: List: Main house; Personnel houses (4); Hangar; Radio station; Power plant; Laboratory (meteorology, astronomy, seismography, riometry); Deposits

Belgrano I Base (Spanish: Base Belgrano I) was a permanent, all year-round Argentine Antarctic base and scientific research station, located on Piedrabuena Bay on the Filchner Ice Shelf. It was named after General Manuel Belgrano, one of the Libertadores and the creator of the Argentine flag.

At the time of its inauguration in 1954 it became Argentina's southernmost permanent base. It was shut down in 1980 over safety concerns due to it being built on increasingly unstable ice, which endangered both personnel and equipment. A new, larger replacement base was established further south and named Belgrano II; this was followed by Belgrano III, which became the southernmost of the three.

== History ==
On 18 November 1954 the Antarctic Naval Task Force, commanded by Ship-of-the-Line Captain Alicio E. Ogara, sailed from Buenos Aires with the objective of setting up a base on the Filchner Ice Shelf that would serve as a launch point for expeditions to the South Pole. The fleet consisted of ARA Bahía Buen Suceso, ARA Bahía Aguirre, ARA Punta Loyola, ARA Chiriguano, ARA Sanavirón, ARA Yamana and the icebreaker ARA General San Martín.

On 2 January 1955 the expedition sailed up to the southernmost point of the Weddell Sea at 78° 01' S. At the time it set a new world record for the highest austral latitude ever reached by boat. The task force then sailed north along the ice wall, seeking a place to anchor.

On 3 January Brigade General Hernán Pujato, director of the Argentine Antarctic Institute, flew over the ice shelf area aboard a helicopter to choose a suitable place to mount the base, selecting a small cove where the high wall of ice sloped down to the sea.

The unloading of materials, equipment, tools, instruments and consumables was conducted from ARA General San Martín. The team built a main house, four quonset huts, food stores and a hangar. They left on the new base enough fuel for three years.

On 26 October 1965 Colonel Jorge Edgard Leal launched an expedition from Belgrano I that reached the South Pole on 10 December.

Belgrano I was shut down after 25 years of continuous service, due to the fast deterioration of the ice barrier it was sitting on; new, often hidden cracks and crevices endangered the on-duty personnel and material. The base was closed in January 1980 and all of its staff and equipment were evacuated by helicopters operating from the icebreaker ARA Almirante Irízar. In order to continue asserting Argentine sovereignty over the area while carrying out the planned scientific activities, and after the Argentine Army had conducted detailed studies on alternative locations, it was decided to lay the new facilities on solid land on a new base called Belgrano II.

The glacier upon which Belgrano I was standing was continuously drifting towards the sea; eventually it would become a tabular iceberg afloat in the Southern Ocean.

On 26 January 1988 a helicopter from Almirante Irízar confirmed that a tabular iceberg about 100 km (62 mi) long had split from the ice shelf. It contained Belgrano I's remains, the Salta Refuge, two beacons, and the abandoned Shackleton (British) and Drushznaya (Soviet) stations. This time Almirante Irízar reached 78° 21' 02" S in the Weddell Sea, a new world record.

Another helicopter flyby in January 1989 showed that the iceberg had split into several smaller pieces, which made location of the remains unpractical. The iceberg continued drifting through the Southern Ocean, where the base's remains have presumably been lost.

== Description ==
During winter this desolate region is almost totally devoid of animal life. In summer, seals, petrels, skuas and emperor penguins can occasionally be spotted. The landscape comprises only white plains.

Due to heavy snow precipitations, Belgrano I was almost totally covered by snow and ice. Only the launching platform for weather balloons, the aurorae observation tower and chimneys and antennae stuck out on the surface.

The base also had a system of tunnels dug in the ice and further buried by the copious snowing: some of them were more than 10 m (33 ft) deep. These passages provided a safer means of walking across buildings without exposure to the exterior freezing temperatures and whipping winds; they were also used as temporary deposits.

=== Scientific activities ===
Being placed in the auroral zone, Belgrano was ideal for studies of the upper atmosphere, characterized by constant magnetic and ionospheric disturbances. In 1970 a new facility was built: the LABEL laboratory (LAboratory BELgrano), dedicated to further study of these phenomena. It was located some 250 m (820 ft) from the main house and other dependencies of the base, and it housed scientific instruments for aurora australis observations, This activity ran across the penumbra and total darkness periods, from 15 March to 10 October. A tower equipped with all-sky cameras photographed the whole celestial hemisphere every minute in order to compose a continuous record of aurorae evolution. Behavior of the ionospheric layers was studied through surveys carried out every 15 minutes. Cosmic radiation was measured by riometer and radiosondes.

Upon closure of Belgrano I, the LABEL laboratory was moved to Belgrano II along with all its equipment and instruments.

== See also ==
- Argentine Antarctica
- List of Antarctic research stations
- List of Antarctic field camps
