= National University of Patagonia San Juan Bosco =

Argentine university

Coordinates: 54.8075°S 68.3257°W

National University of the Patagonia San Juan Bosco
- Universidad Nacional de la Patagonia San Juan Bosco
- Type: Public
- Established: February 25, 1980
- Academic staff: 2,904
- Students: 14,488
- Location: several cities, several Provinces, Argentina
- Website: http://www.unp.edu.ar/

The National University of the Patagonia San Juan Bosco (Spanish: Universidad Nacional de la Patagonia San Juan Bosco) is a higher education establishment in Patagonia, southern Argentina. It was created on February 25, 1980, by law 22.713, as the merge of two national universities: the "Universidad de San Juan Bosco" and "Universidad Nacional de la Patagonia". It is named after San Juan Bosco, patron saint of the area.

The university has five faculties - Engineering, Economy, Humanities, Legal, and Natural Sciences, spread over several cities in Patagonia: Puerto Madryn, Trelew, Esquel, Comodoro Rivadavia, and Ushuaia. The central faculty is located in Comodoro Rivadavia. The University has as of 2005 14,000 students, with 5000 in the main school.

In 2015, the university opened to the inhabitants of the Falkland Islands. The academic program was translated into English, language courses were designed and a system of special scholarship was established. Thus, National University of the Patagonia San Juan Bosco became the first Argentine university to extend their academic offer to Falkland Islanders.

== Notable alumni ==
- Viviana Alder, marine microbiologist, Argentine Antarctic researcher

== See also ==
- List of Argentine universities
