= Hernán Pujato =

Argentine explorer (1904-2003)

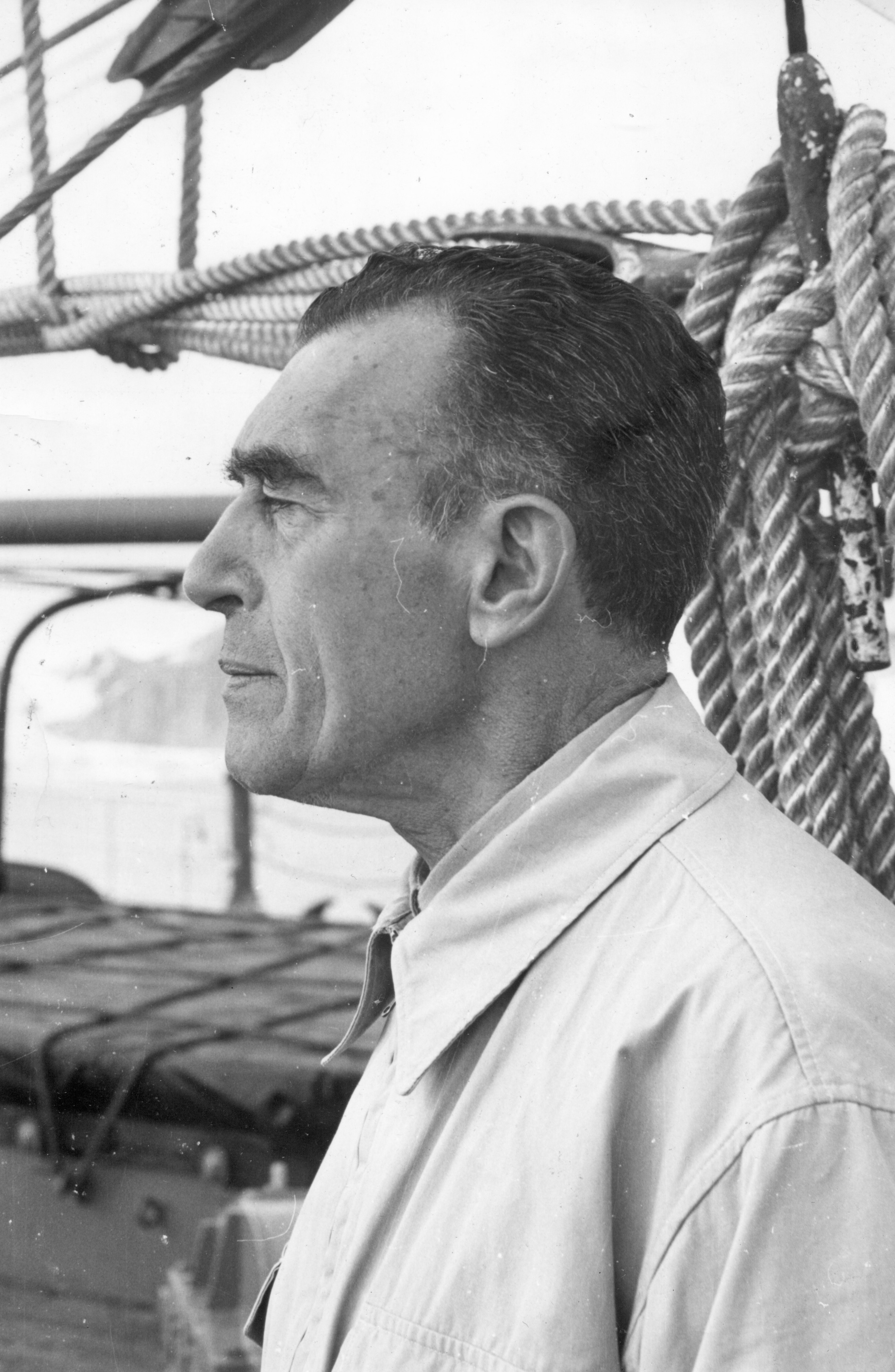

Hernán Pujato (1904 – 2003) was an Argentine military general, diplomat, and explorer. He founded the first Antarctica bases for his country, and founded the Instituto Antártico Argentino. Through this institute, Pujato attempted to colonize Antarctica, with the assistance of President Juan Perón.

== Early life ==
Pujato was the son of José Diego Pujato and Martina García. He was born in Diamante, Entre Ríos on the same year that Argentina opened the first permanent base on Antarctica, Orcadas Base on Laurie Island. After his early education in Diamante, Entre Ríos, he went to secondary school in Buenos Aires. He then studied at the Colegio Militar de la Nación in Buenos Aires.

== Military career ==
By 1949, Pujato was a colonel. This year, he presented a plan for Antarctica to president Juan Perón. Pujato proposed creating a scientific institute for research purposes and establishing scientific and population bases in Antarctica. Perón's initial interest led to Pujato visiting the United States and Greenland to study survival in extreme latitudes.

By 1951, Pujato was ready to attempt building a new settlement. With the Argentine Navy, Pujato hired the Santa Micaela. Commanded by Overseas Captain Santiago Farrell, it was a cargo ship belonging to the Argentine shipping company Pérez Companc S. A. The Santa Micaela left the port of Buenos Aires on 12 February 1951, and on 8 March it anchored at Marguerite Bay. The settlement, San Martín Base was a success, and still stands today. It was the first human settlement south of the Antarctic Circle. For his success, Pujato was promoted to brigadier general and saw the foundation of the Instituto Antártico Argentino (IAA).

The next year, Pujato founded Belgrano I Base in Argentina, which stood until 1980. This was the most southerly station in the world at the time. From this station, Pujato and others flew reconnaissance in the area. For this work, Pujato was promoted to general.

Pujato's career ended abruptly in 1955. President Perón lost power in the Revolución Libertadora, and the new government, led by Pedro Eugenio Aramburu, forced Pujato to retire.

Pujato played no major roles in Argentina after this. During the Falklands War, the 78-year old retired general offered to play a kamikaze-type role against the British ship HMS Invincible, but was refused.

== See also ==
- Colonization of Antarctica
