= Orcadas Base =

Argentine Antarctic base

- Antarctic base
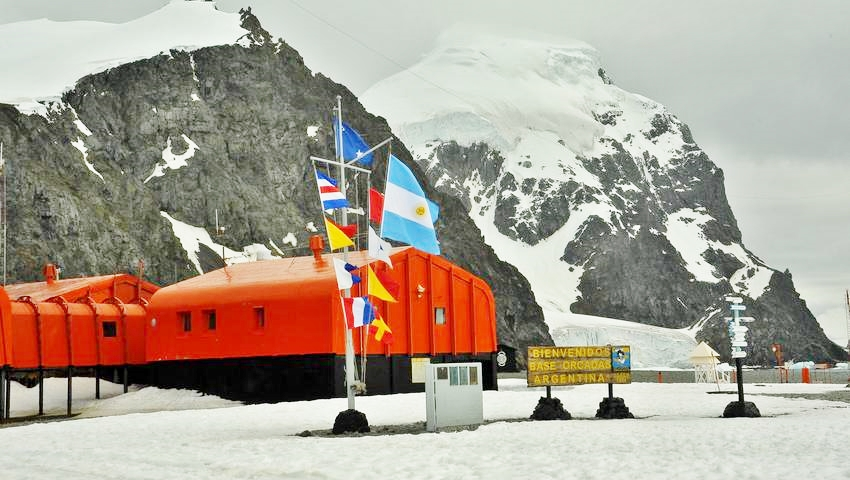
- Orcadas Base in January 2018

- Location of Orcadas Station in Antarctica
- Coordinates: 60°44′17″S 44°44′16″W
- Country: Argentina
- Province: Tierra del Fuego, Antarctica, and South Atlantic Islands Province
- Department: Antártida Argentina
- Region: South Orkney Islands (Spanish: Islas Orcadas del Sur)
- Location: Laurie Island
- Established: 1 April 1903 (by the Scottish National Antarctic Expedition)
- Founded: 22 February 1904; 122 years ago

Government
  - Type: Directorate
  - Body: Dirección Nacional del Antártico
- Elevation: 8 m (26 ft)

Population (2017)
  - Summer: 35
  - Winter: 17
- Time zone: UTC-3 (ART)
- UN/LOCODE: AQ ORC
- Type: All year-round
- Period: Annual
- Status: Operational
- Activities: List: Continental glaciology; Seismology; Sea-ice-zone glaciology; Meteorology

Base Orcadas is an Argentine scientific station in Antarctica, and the oldest of the stations in Antarctica still in operation. It is located on Laurie Island, one of the South Orkney Islands (Spanish: Islas Orcadas del Sur), at 4 meters (13 ft) above sea level and 170 meters (558 ft) from the coastline. Established by the Scottish National Antarctic Expedition in 1903 and transferred to the Argentine government in 1904, the base has been permanently populated since, being one of six Argentine permanent bases in Argentina's claim to Antarctica, and the first permanently inhabited base in Antarctica.

The nearest Argentine port is Ushuaia, which is 1,502 km (811 nmi) away. The base has 11 buildings and four main topics of research: continental glaciology, seismology, sea-ice-zone glaciology (since 1985) and meteorological observations (since 1904).

Orcadas was the only station on the islands for 40 years until the British established a small summer base, Cape Geddes Station in Laurie Island in 1946, replaced by Signy Research Station in Signy Island in 1947. It also had the first radiotelegraph in the continent in 1927. The 11 buildings of the station house up to 65 people during the summer, and an average of 17 during winter. The scientific activities are carried out at the Laboratorio Antártico Mutidisciplinario en Base Orcadas (LABORC), the "Multidisciplinary Antarctic Laboratory at Base Orcadas".

== History ==
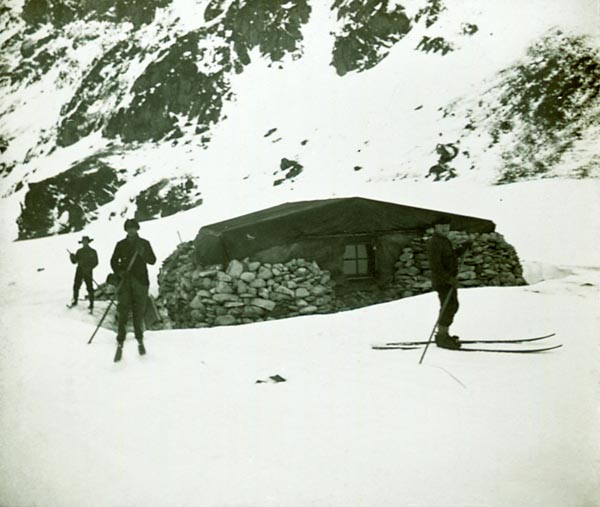
"Omond House", the beginning of Orcadas, the first and oldest permanent Antarctic base, constructed in 1903 by the Scottish National Antarctic Expedition

In 1903 Dr William S. Bruce's Scottish National Antarctic Expedition established Omond House, a meteorological station on Laurie Island. During the expedition, however, the crew became stuck in the ice and, unable to sail off, were trapped in the station for the winter.

Bruce left the station in December of that year for Buenos Aires to fix the ship and obtain supplies, leaving meteorologist Robert C. Mossman in charge of the base to continue the observations.

Bruce offered to the Government of President Julio Argentino Roca the transfer of the station and instruments for the sum of 5.000 pesos, on the condition that the government committed itself to the continuation of the scientific mission. He also offered to transport in his ship the appointed personnel back to the station.

Bruce had informed the British officer William Haggard of his intentions in December 1903. On 29 December, Haggard sent a note to the Argentine Foreign Minister, José Terry, ratifying the terms of Bruce's proposition. Roca submitted the matter to the Oficina Meteorológica Nacional (National Office of Meteorology) who advised him to accept the offer. On January 2, 1904, the installations were accepted through a presidential decree.

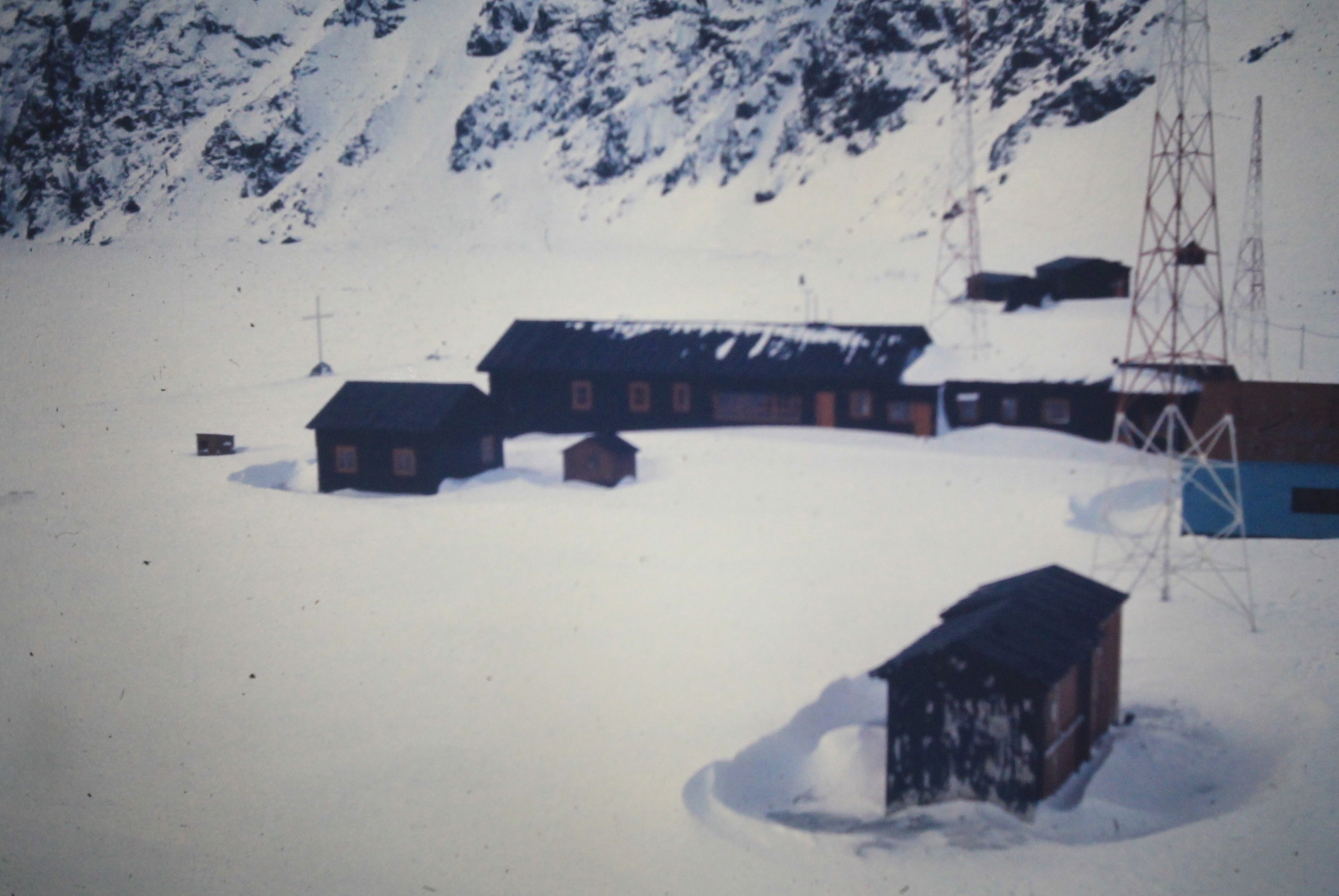
Orcadas Base in 1970

The Scotia sailed back for Laurie Island on 14 January 1904 carrying on board Luciano H. Valette, from the Office of Zoology of the Ministry of Agriculture, Edgard C. Szmula, employee of the National Meteorological Office, and Hugo Acuña, from the Ministry of Livestock, who was also designated Postal Chief of the Orkney Islands by the Director General of the National Postal and Telegraphs Office, Manuel García Fernández. Mossman was left in charge of the expedition, along with William Smith as cook.

In 1906, Argentina communicated to the international community the establishment of a permanent base on the South Orkney Islands. On August 26, Haggard sent a letter to Foreign Minister Manuel Montes de Oca reminding him that South Orkneys Islands were British. The British position was that Argentine personnel was granted permission only for the period of one year. Argentine government ignored the note, "considering it out of time".

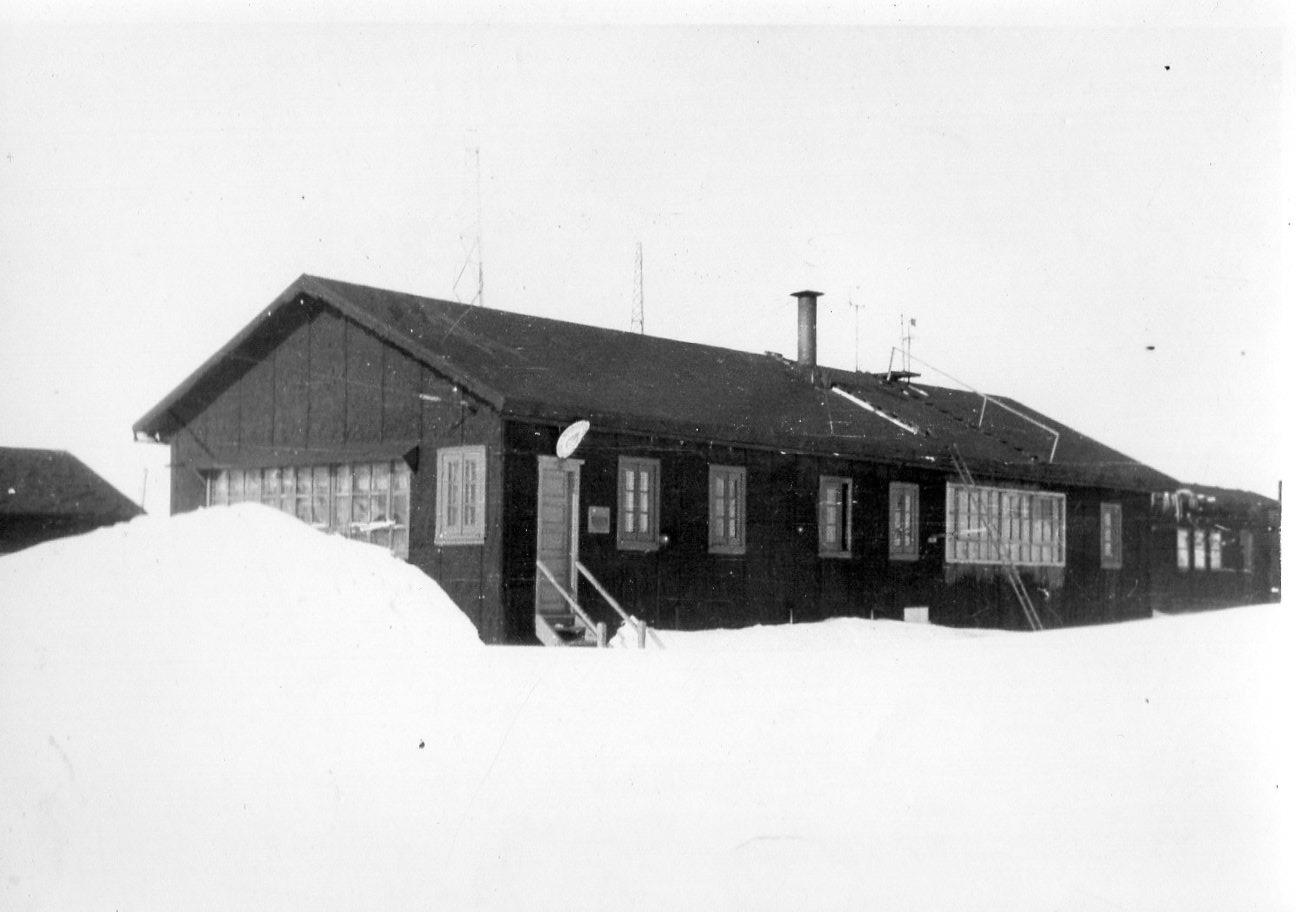
Orcadas Base, c. 1927

On March 30, 1927, naval non-commissioned officer Emilio Baldoni established the first radio telegraph link with Ushuaia. Up to that point, the Orcadas Base had remained isolated from the rest of the world until the yearly relief arrived. The radio station (coded LRT in Argentina) allowed for a permanent communication link.

The station depended on the Ministry of Agriculture until Argentine Navy relieved the crew with navy personnel on March 3, 1951. Formal transfer occurred on December 23, 1952, when by presidential decree the base was put under the Service of Maritime Hydrography as Destacamento Naval Orcadas ("Orcadas naval Detachment").

== Climate ==
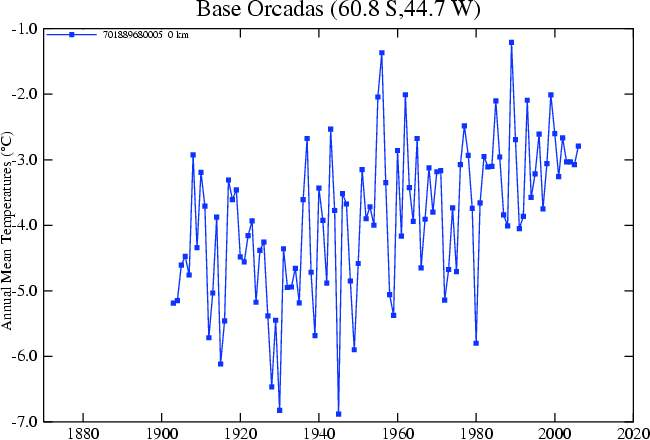
Annual mean temperatures measured at Orcadas Base, 1901–2007

Under the Köppen climate classification system, the station is located under a tundra climate (ET), very close to an ice cap climate (EF). The base is influenced by the cold Antarctic Circumpolar Current that runs past the Weddell Sea and the strong westerly winds, creating a colder climate than the coastal areas in the northwestern parts of the Antarctic Peninsula. Weather conditions can vary widely from year to year and day to day since low pressure systems frequently pass through the islands, which influences the climate.

Mean monthly temperatures range from −9.4 °C (15.1 °F) in June to 1.0 °C (33.8 °F) in February. In summer, the average high is 2.7 °C (36.9 °F) while the average low is −1.1 °C (30.0 °F). During winter, the average high is −4.9 °C (23.2 °F) while the average low is −13.0 °C (8.6 °F). Temperatures can occasionally rise above freezing during winter. When low pressure systems pass to the south of the base, they can result in exceptionally mild temperatures, with the highest temperature recorded being 15.2 °C (59.4 °F) in 1987. However, when this occurs, the weather is stormy and cloudy with reduced visibility. In contrast, when low pressure systems pass to the north, it results in cold and dry conditions with good visibility, causing temperatures to fall to −44.0 °C (−47.2 °F).

Fog is a frequent occurrence in the base, averaging 110 days. This can vary from year to year with 1987 being the foggiest year when there were 252 days with fog to only 30 days with fog in 1963. Being located in the path of low pressure systems throughout the year, the base experiences high cloud cover, particularly in summer. December and January are the cloudiest months, averaging 29 cloudy days each month. Winters are less cloudy, averaging 20 cloudy days in June and July. Clear days are extremely rare and only occur between May and October, averaging 1–3 days. As a result, the base only averages 483.0 hours of sunshine per year or 13.5% of possible sunshine (possibly the lowest on earth), ranging from a low of 9.3% in January to a high of 22.5% in August.

December and January are the least windy months, averaging 19 to 21 km/h (12 to 13 mph) while August and September are the windiest months, averaging more than 25 km/h (16 mph). The base is subjected to strong winds throughout the year, with each month averaging 20 days with strong winds (wind speeds above 46 km/h (29 mph)). Occasionally, it can experience gusts above 150 km/h (93 mph).

The average annual precipitation is 398.4 mm (15.69 in), which is fairly evenly distributed throughout the year. March is the wettest month while June is the driest month. Due to the cold climate and exposure to maritime westerlies, snowfall occurs frequently throughout the year. Based on the 1961–1990 period, the base averages 227 days with snow, with February having the least days with snow (averaging 14 days with snow) and May having the most days with snow (averaging 22 days).

Climate data for Orcadas Base (1991−2020 normals, extremes 1903−present)
Month	Jan	Feb	Mar	Apr	May	Jun	Jul	Aug	Sep	Oct	Nov	Dec	Year
Record high °C (°F)	12.0 (53.6)	12.3 (54.1)	10.9 (51.6)	12.6 (54.7)	8.8 (47.8)	9.8 (49.6)	10.0 (50.0)	9.0 (48.2)	10.5 (50.9)	9.6 (49.3)	12.6 (54.7)	11.6 (52.9)	12.6 (54.7)
Mean daily maximum °C (°F)	3.6 (38.5)	3.4 (38.1)	2.4 (36.3)	0.4 (32.7)	−2.0 (28.4)	−3.9 (25.0)	−5.3 (22.5)	−4.1 (24.6)	−2.0 (28.4)	0.6 (33.1)	2.5 (36.5)	3.0 (37.4)	−0.1 (31.8)
Daily mean °C (°F)	1.3 (34.3)	1.4 (34.5)	0.3 (32.5)	−1.8 (28.8)	−5.0 (23.0)	−7.5 (18.5)	−9.4 (15.1)	−8.1 (17.4)	−5.6 (21.9)	−2.7 (27.1)	−0.6 (30.9)	0.5 (32.9)	−3.1 (26.4)
Mean daily minimum °C (°F)	−0.7 (30.7)	−0.4 (31.3)	−1.6 (29.1)	−4.1 (24.6)	−8.1 (17.4)	−11.3 (11.7)	−14.1 (6.6)	−12.4 (9.7)	−9.8 (14.4)	−6.0 (21.2)	−3.2 (26.2)	−1.7 (28.9)	−6.1 (21.0)
Record low °C (°F)	−7.7 (18.1)	−7.9 (17.8)	−14.4 (6.1)	−24.0 (−11.2)	−30.2 (−22.4)	−39.8 (−39.6)	−36.0 (−32.8)	−44.0 (−47.2)	−30.8 (−23.4)	−27.6 (−17.7)	−16.7 (1.9)	−8.7 (16.3)	−44.0 (−47.2)
Average precipitation mm (inches)	43.9 (1.73)	73.5 (2.89)	73.0 (2.87)	73.4 (2.89)	62.6 (2.46)	52.1 (2.05)	44.8 (1.76)	51.6 (2.03)	48.0 (1.89)	48.2 (1.90)	44.7 (1.76)	46.4 (1.83)	662.2 (26.07)
Average precipitation days (≥ 0.1 mm)	18	20	21	20	20	18	17	18	19	20	19	18	228
Average snowy days	15.6	12.9	16.8	18.6	19.2	20.5	18.9	19.8	19.5	21.5	19.0	19.8	221.9
Average relative humidity (%)	85	86	86	86	85	85	83	84	84	86	86	86	86
Mean monthly sunshine hours	49.6	36.8	34.1	24.0	12.4	3.0	6.2	31.0	45.0	52.7	60.0	58.9	413.7
Mean daily sunshine hours	1.6	1.3	1.1	0.8	0.4	0.1	0.2	1.0	1.5	1.7	2.0	1.9	1.1
Percentage possible sunshine	9.3	9.8	9.9	10.1	10.8	15.2	13.2	22.5	21.8	17.6	11.2	12.0	13.5
Source 1: Servicio Meteorológico Nacional (temperature/snowy days/sun 1991–2020, precipitation days 1961–1990, humidity/percent sunshine 1903–1950)
Source 2: NOAA (precipitation 1961–1990), Meteo Climat (record highs and lows)

== Lighthouse ==
Destacamento Lighthouse
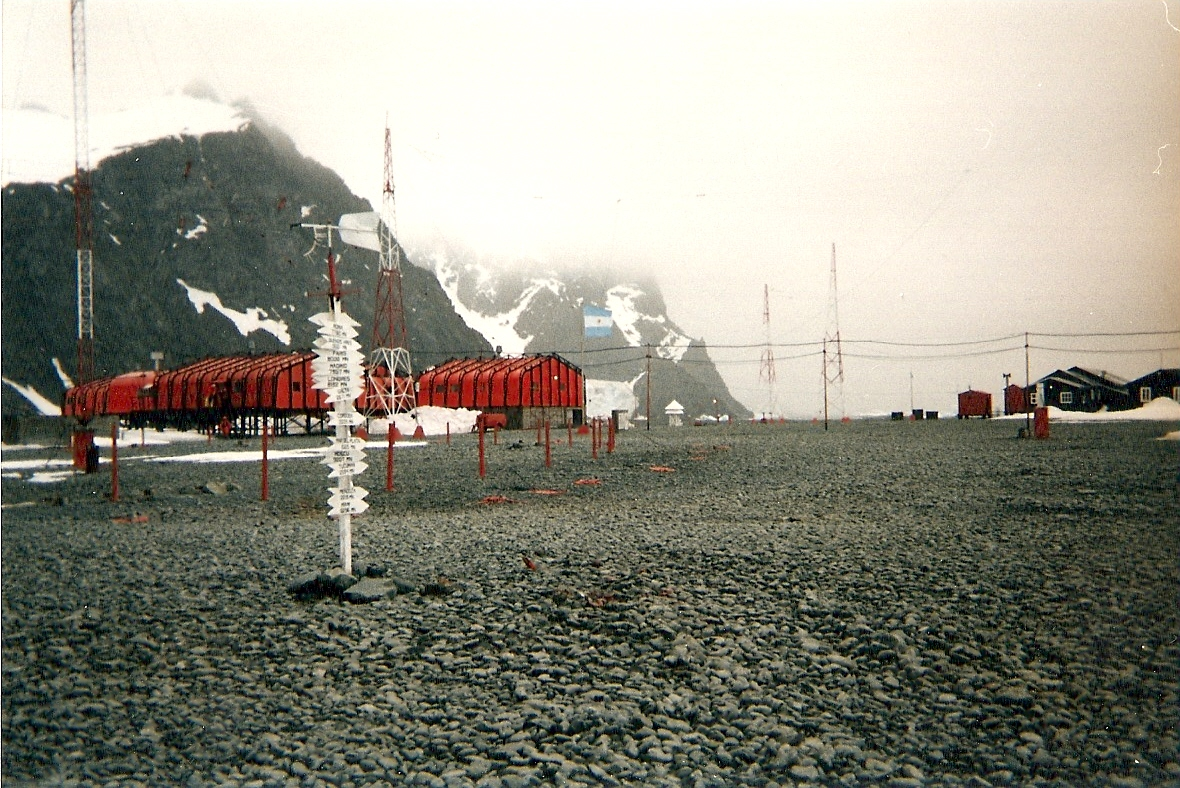
- Location: Laurie Island, Orcadas Base, Argentine Antarctica, Argentina
- Coordinates: 60°44′16″S 44°44′21″W

Tower
- Foundation: Concrete base
- Construction: Metal skeletal tower
- Shape: Square pyramidal skeletal radio tower with lantern atop
- Markings: White and red horizontal bands
- Operator: Argentine Navy

Light
- Characteristic: Fl W 3s

Orcadas Base is the site of the Destacamento Lighthouse, a navigation light mounted on a communications tower. It is maintained by the Argentine Navy.

== See also ==
- Argentine Antarctica
  - Day of the Argentine Antarctic
- List of Antarctic expeditions
- List of lighthouses in Antarctica
- List of Antarctic research stations
- List of Antarctic field camps
