= José María Sobral =

Argentine scientist (1880–1961)

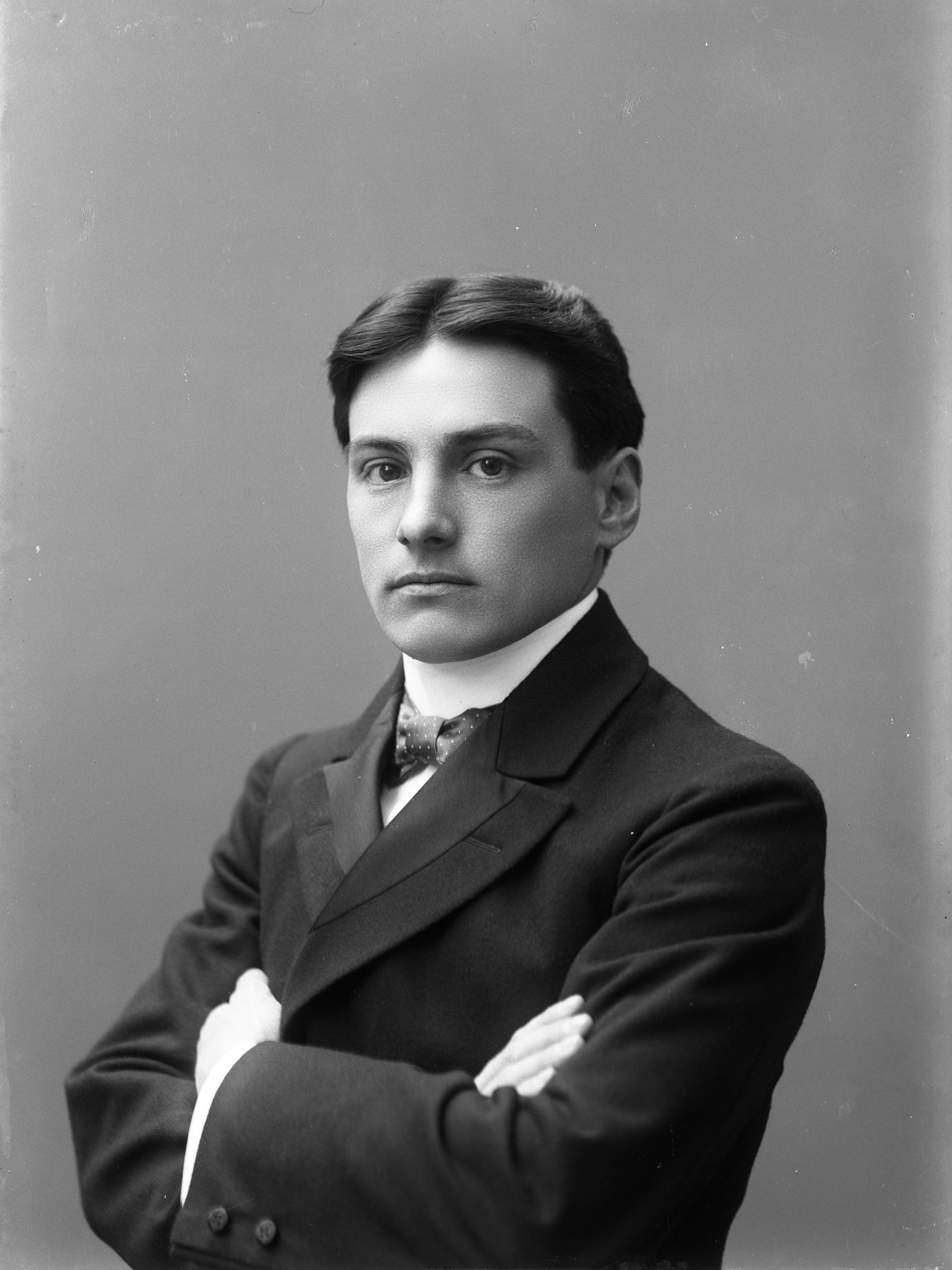
- Born: April 14, 1880; Gualeguaychú, Argentina
- Died: April 14, 1961 (aged 81); Buenos Aires, Argentina
- Education: Uppsala University
- Awards: David Livingstone Centenary Medal

Alférez de Navío José María Sobral (April 14, 1880 – April 14, 1961) was an Argentine explorer, geologist, naval officer and author who rose to prominence by participating in the Swedish Antarctic Expedition (1901–1904) becoming the first Argentine to overwinter in Antarctica. Later he pursued studies at Uppsala University becoming the first Argentine to obtain a geology degree. Sobral worked briefly as ambassador to Norway in 1930 before returning to Argentina to work at YPF.

== Biography ==
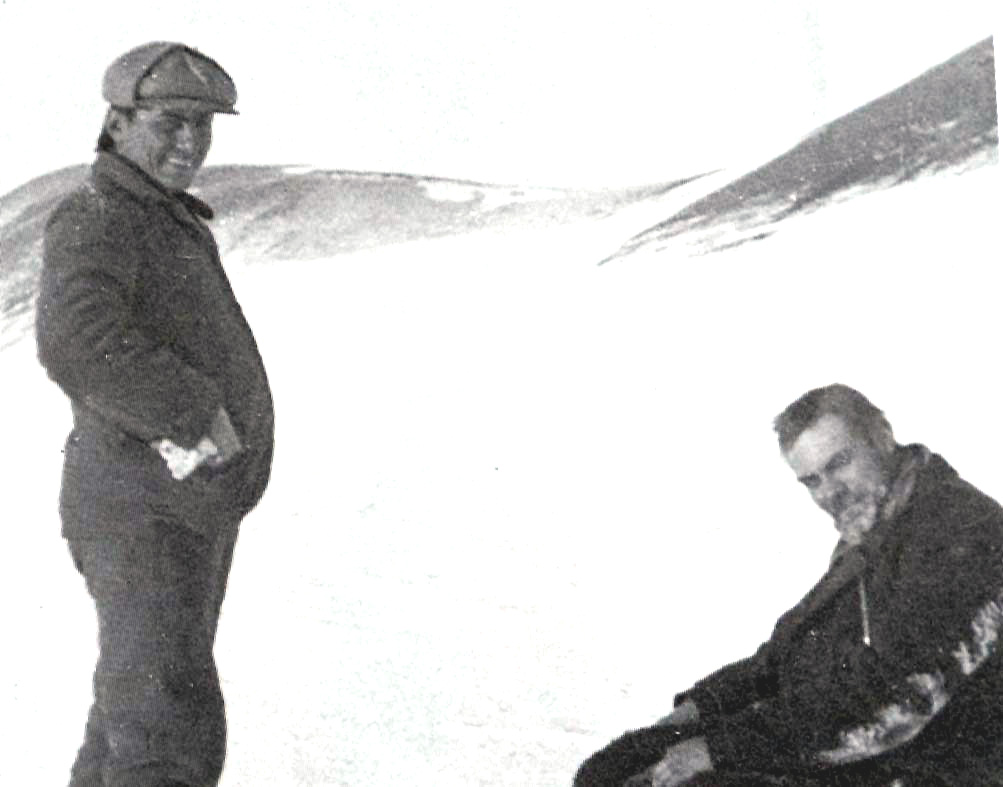
Sobral (left) and Nordenskjöld

Sobral was born in Gualeguaychú, Entre Ríos. He joined the Swedish Antarctic Expedition on the ship Antarctic in Buenos Aires at the end of 1901, when the group headed by Otto Nordenskjöld asked the Argentine Government for supplies, to perform a series of meteorological, biological geological and geodesical studies.

The expedition arrived at Snow Hill Island at the Weddell Sea in 1902, where they were to spend one winter. But the ship that was to return to pick them up, the Antarctic, under command of Captain Carl Larsen, was crushed by the ice and sank, leaving the expedition to spend a second winter on Snow Hill Island, with no communication with the mainland or the Antarctic party, which was stranded and spent the winter in rough shelter on Paulet Island. A year later the Argentine corvette Uruguay rescued the survivors, including the Argentine officer.

Upon return to Argentina Sobral left the navy and went to Sweden to study geology at the Uppsala University, where he doctored in 1913. In 1906 he married Swedish Elna W. Klingström, with whom he would have 9 children.

In 1914 he returned to Argentina, working as National Director of Mining and Hydrology until 1924. In 1930 he was named Argentine consul in Norway, but returned to Argentina a year later to work for Argentine national oil company YPF. He retired in 1935, but continued travelling around Argentina and giving geology lectures until his death in Buenos Aires in 1961, coincidentally on his 81st birthday.

== Legacy ==
Sobral wrote a number of books on the Argentine army, Argentina-Chile relations, geology, and his antarctic adventure. He is considered the father of the Argentine Antarctica, a national hero and the first Argentine geologist.

The Argentine summer Base Alférez de Navío Sobral was built in 1965 and is located at 81°05' S, 40°00' W, in Edith Ronne Land facing the Filchner Ice Shelf. It supported the Argentine Army's overland expedition to the South Pole in 1965.

A stamp bearing Sobral's image and Snow Hill Island is Argentina Scott #1070, 1975.

The Argentine Navy patrol boat ARA Alferez Sobral (A-9) was named after him.

== Distinctions ==
- Sweden: Knight of the Order of the Polar Star
- Sweden: Order of the Sword

== See also ==
- Carl Caldenius
