= Operación 90 =

1965 operation of the Argentine Army to cement claims on Antarctica

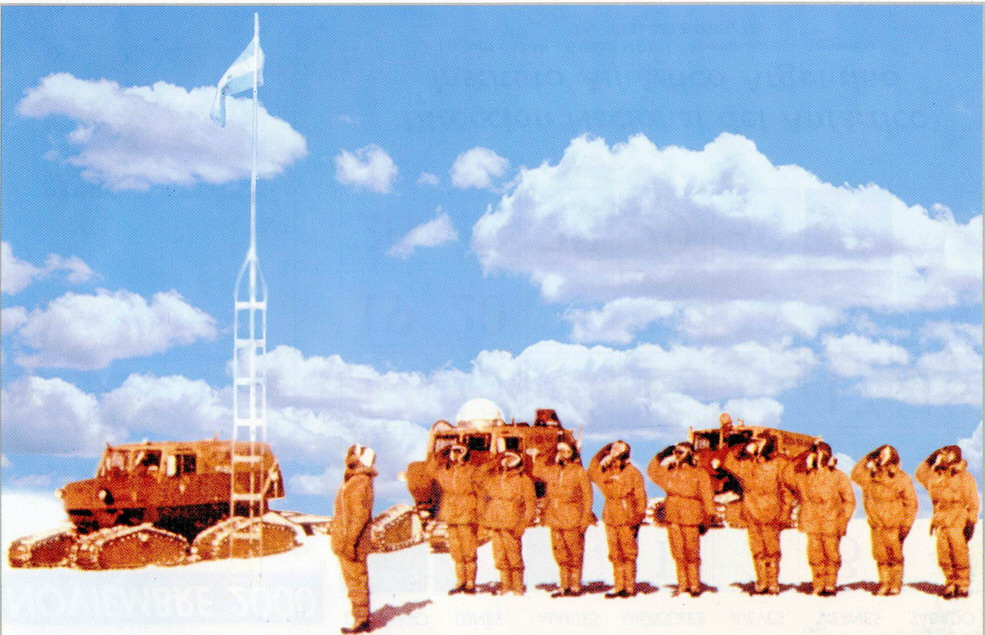
Soldiers saluting the Argentine flag at the South Pole. Tucker Sno-Cats are behind them.

Operación 90 (Operation Ninety) was the first Argentine ground expedition to the South Pole, carried out in 1965 by ten soldiers of the Argentine Army under then-Colonel Jorge Edgar Leal. It was also the first Latin-American expedition to the South Pole. It was named after the target: 90 degree South latitude point (the geographic South Pole)

The operation had been originally conceived by General Hernán Pujato in the early 1950s but could not be carried out due a lack of forward bases and icebreakers The plan was revived in 1961, and finally approved in July 1962 Preparations began in 1963 and suffered multiple mishaps, including the loss of a Douglas C-47 plane, which crashed while scouting possible routes; the crew was rescued a few days later. Colonel Jorge Edgar Leal, chief of the General Staff's Antarctic Division, was chosen to lead the expedition.

One of the goals of the expedition was to perform scientific measurements and observations. To accomplish this, the soldiers were trained on how to use various meteorological, glaciological, gravimetric, magnetic and topographic equipment. There was also a political goal: to show that Argentina could exert sovereignty on a portion of Antarctica that the country claims as its own (See Territorial claims in Antarctica)

Leal's team departed on six snowcat vehicles (believed to be Tucker Sno-Cats based on the spelling used) from General Belgrano Army Base on October 26, 1965. The main group was preceded by a scouting four-men patrol on a sled drawn by 18 dogs. While the scouts remained at 83° 2″ S, Leal and his men reached the geographic South Pole on December 10. Shortly after, they were met by a radar operator from the US Amundsen–Scott South Pole Station, who asked them who they were and what they were doing there. After Leal explained that they were not Soviets, base commander William R. Griffin congratulated them and invited them to share a meal: the first decent food, said Leal, that the group had in some weeks. He also offered the Argentines spare parts to repair their snowcat vehicles, tools, and access to the base's workshop. Leal hesitated, fearing that foreign assistance could diminish the value of the expedition, but ultimately accepted. They then returned to Base Belgrano, which they reached on December 31. Overall, the mission lasted 66 days.

The group received a hero's welcome upon their return to Buenos Aires and were congratulated personally by President Arturo Umberto Illia. Leal was promoted to General a few years later Despite his success, he was pushed out of the military by General Alejandro Agustín Lanusse, and spent some time in prison due to his opposition to Operation Soberanía and the Malvinas War

== Trivia ==
Before leaving the Amundsen base, Leal and his men were given diplomas recognizing them as members for life of the "Penguin Emperor's Court", a long-running inside joke among Antarctic explorers.

== See also ==
- List of Antarctic expeditions
