= Day of the Argentine Antarctic =

Day of the Argentine Antarctic Argentine Antarctica Day
- The department of Argentine Antarctica, between 60°S 25°W and 60°S 74°W overlaps land claims by both Chile and the United Kingdom.
- Official name: Día de la Antártida Argentina
- Also called: Argentine Antarctica Day; Argentina Antarctica Day; Argentine Antarctic Sovereignty Day
- Observed by: People in: Argentina; Argentine Antarctica
- Type: National
- Date: 22 February
- Next time: February 22, 2026
- Frequency: Annual
- Started by: Juan Domingo Perón, President of Argentina
- Related to: Malvinas Day (April 2); Antarctic Brotherhood Day (June 21); National Sovereignty Day (November 20)

In Argentina, the Day of the Argentine Antarctic, or Argentine Antarctic Sovereignty Day (Spanish: Día de la Antártida Argentina, lit. 'day of the Argentine Antarctic'), is commemorated annually on 22 February. It commemorates what Argentina says was the first permanent settlement, in 1904, in an area later claimed as an integral part of the country. The claimed area is designated de jure a department in the Argentine province of Tierra del Fuego, Antarctica, and the South Atlantic Islands. Argentina has no de facto authority over that part of Antarctica outside its bases. The area is also claimed by the United Kingdom and, in most part, by Chile.

== See also ==
- Malvinas Day
