= List of Antarctic churches =

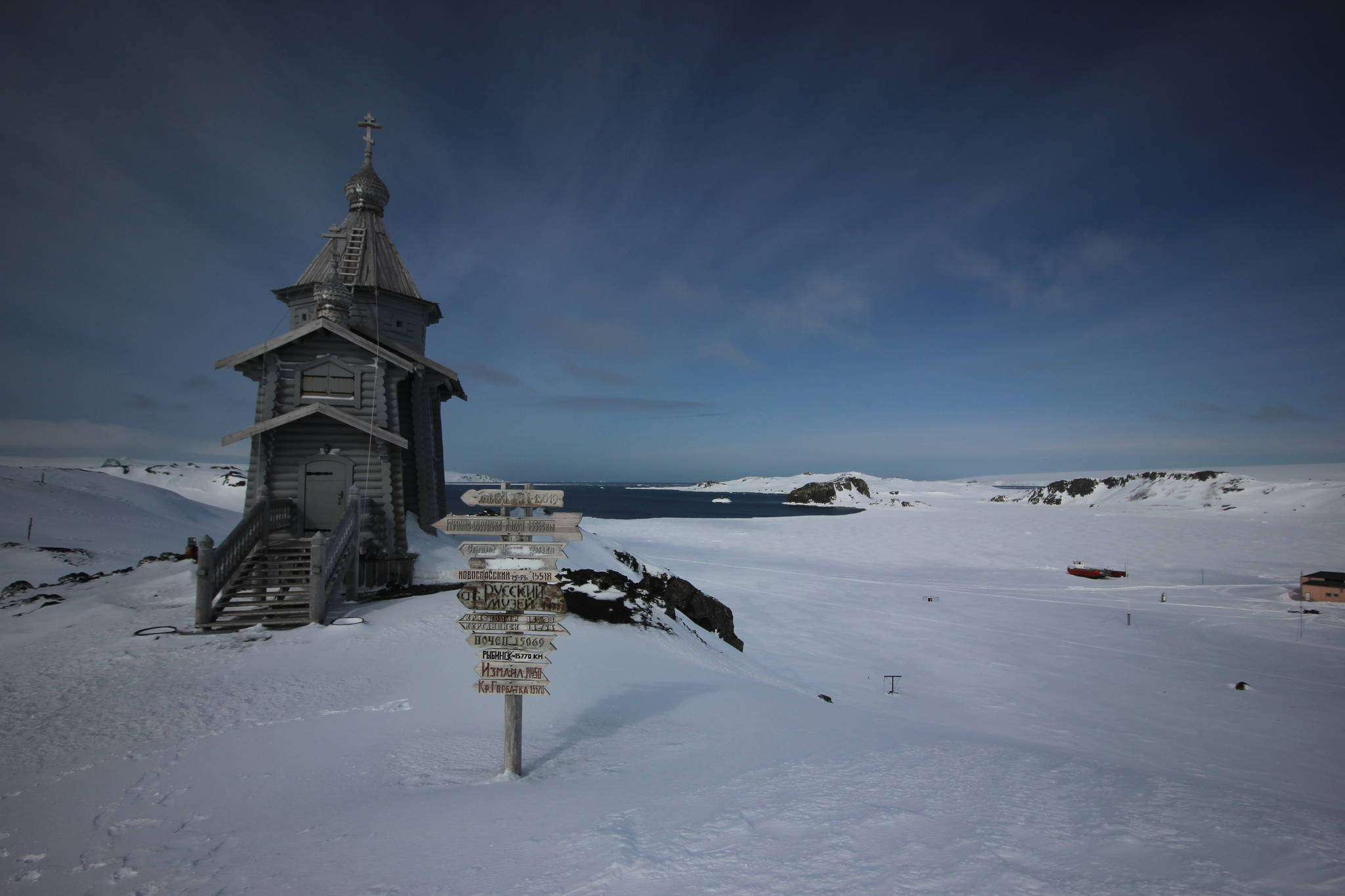
Trinity Church on King George Island

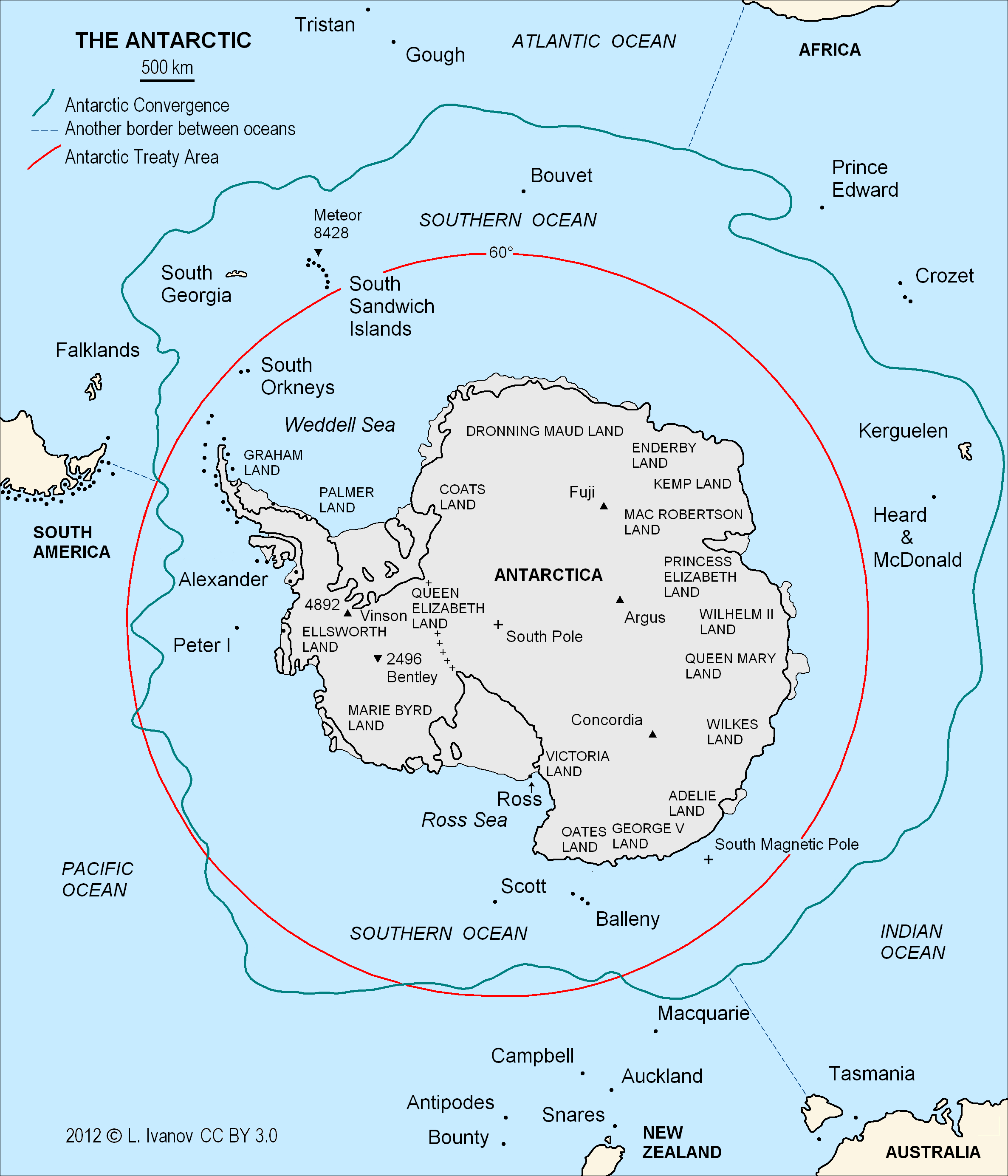
Map of the Antarctic

There exist a number of Antarctic churches, including both Christian churches on Antarctica proper and those that were built south of the Antarctic Convergence. According to the 6th article of the Antarctic Treaty, Antarctica is defined politically as all land and ice shelves south of the 60th parallel, while the nearest natural boundary is the Antarctic Convergence.

There are eight churches on Antarctica proper, with another two located south of the Antarctic Convergence. The southernmost of these religious buildings is the Chapel of Our Lady of the Snows, a Catholic chapel carved out of the ice surrounding the Belgrano II Base, at Bertrab Nunatak. While there are currently only a few freestanding structures dedicated solely to Christian religions, most research stations have small meeting rooms that are dual-purposed partially for religious services. These rooms are also commonly used by adherents of other world religions. The Chapel of the Snows also hosts services for other faith groups such as Latter Day Saints, Baháʼí, and Buddhism. These religious structures serve the entire population of Antarctica, which varies from approximately 4,400 in summer to 1,100 in winter. This population is spread across approximately 40 year-round stations and a range of summer-only stations, camps, and refuges.

== Churches ==
This list catalogs churches and other religious buildings built south of the 60th parallel.

Name	Denomination	Location	Year opened	Picture	Notes
Chapel of Our Lady of the Snows	Catholic	Belgrano II Base, Bertrab Nunatak	After 1979	–	
Chapel of St. Francis of Assisi	Catholic	Esperanza Base, Hope Bay	1976	a small one story orange building on yellow steps with a cross and bell tower on its side.	
Chapel of St. Mary Queen of Peace	Catholic	Villa Las Estrellas, King George Island	?	A white building with a black roof, a small porch, and a double height central tower topped with a white cross	
Chapel of the Blessed Virgin of Luján	Catholic	Marambio Base, Marambio Island	1996	small cluster of orange buildings with the center one having a short bell tower on top.	
Chapel of the Snows	Interfaith	McMurdo Station, Ross Island	1956 Destroyed 1978; Rebuilt 1989	A low slung white and blue clapboard building with a single central steeple.	
St. Ivan Rilski Chapel	Eastern Orthodox	St. Kliment Ohridski Base, Livingston Island	2003 rebuilt 2011	A small red Quonset Hut sittign on a concrete and metal pilings and topped with a cross sits among grey rocks.	
St. Volodymyr Chapel	Eastern Orthodox	Vernadsky Research Base, Galindez Island	2010–2011	A small wooden structure next to several grey buildings	
Trinity Church	Eastern Orthodox	King George Island	2004	A small but detailed wooden structure built with a front staircase and topped with two onion domes.	

== Antarctic Churches not on Antarctica ==
This list catalogs churches and other religious buildings built south of the Antarctic Convergence, but north of the 60th parallel.

Name	Denomination	Location	Year opened	Picture	Notes
Norwegian Anglican Church The Whalers Church	Anglican formerly Norwegian Lutheran	Grytviken, South Georgia	1913	A white wooden church nestled within snow-covered mountains.	
Notre-Dame des Vents	Catholic	Port-aux-Français, Kerguelen Islands	1950s	A white concrete church with a skeletal bell tower and thickly leaded stained glass.	

== Map ==
Locations of churches in Antarctica

== See also ==
- Religion in Antarctica
