= Chapel of St. Mary Queen of Peace =

Coordinates: 62.2000°S 58.9667°W

- Capilla de Santa María Reina de la Paz
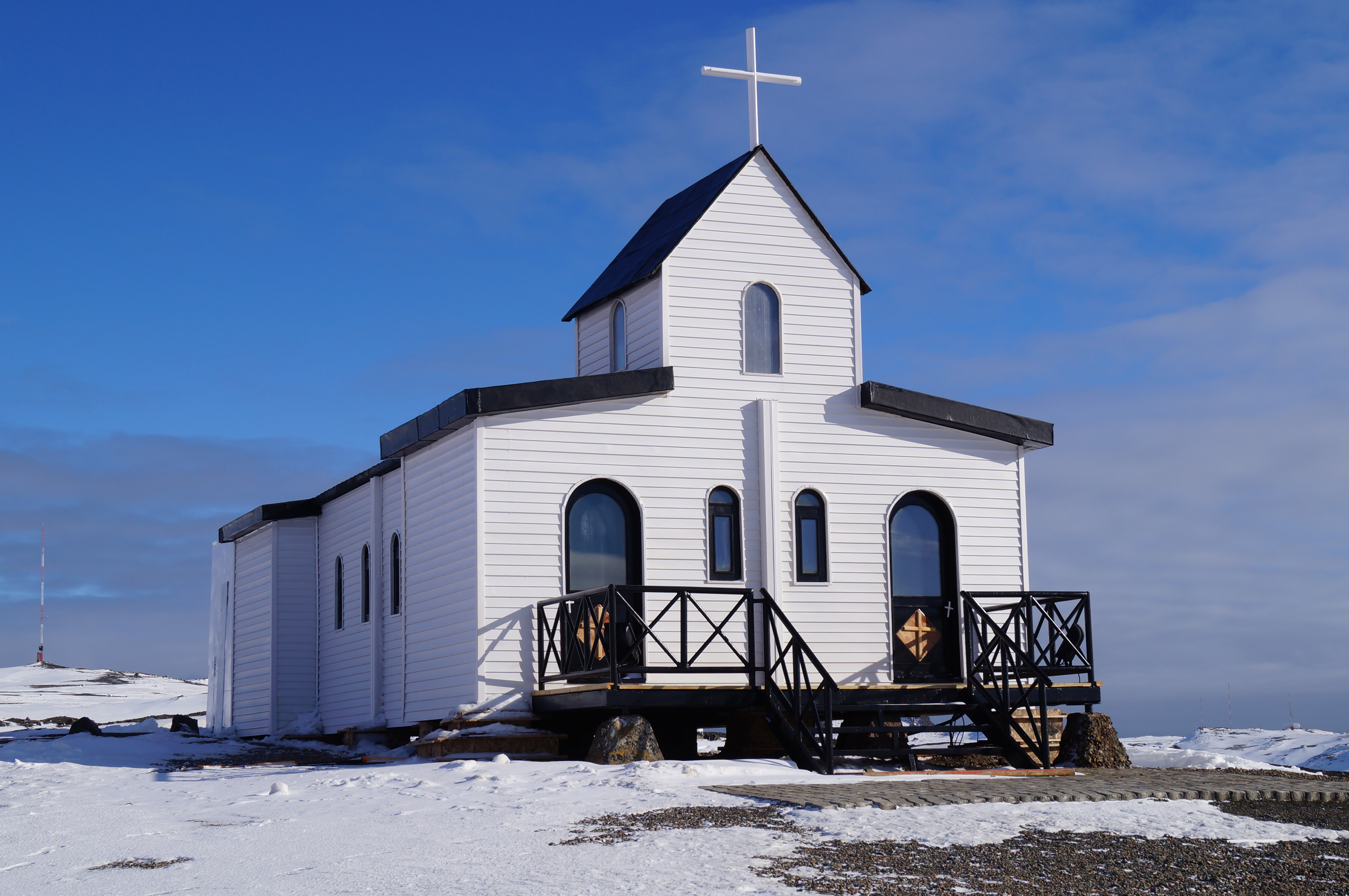
- Chapel of St. Mary Queen of Peace
- Location: Villa Las Estrellas, Antarctica
- Denomination: Catholic Church
- Sui iuris church: Latin Church

History
- Status: Chapel
- Dedication: St. Mary, Queen of Peace

Architecture
- Functional status: Active

Administration
- Diocese: Military Ordinariate of Chile

Clergy
- Bishop: Pedro Mario Ossandón Buljevic

The St. Mary Queen of Peace Chapel (Spanish: Capilla de Santa María Reina de la Paz) is a Catholic chapel located in Villa Las Estrellas, in the Chilean Antarctic Territory (claimed by Chile), which includes in the commune of Antártica, within the Region of Magallanes and Chilean Antarctica, about 1580 km from Punta Arenas. It is one of eight churches on Antarctica. The chapel is basically a large container of metal, modified so that it resembles a common church, whose interior has electricity and a proper heating system. Religious ceremonies are performed by a deacon, who lives permanently in the villa.

The chapel is relatively new, having opened in the late twentieth century. Currently the chapel is the southernmost Chilean Catholic church, and one of the southernmost of the planet.

The temple is part of the Catholic Military Bishopric of Chile (Obispado Castrense de Chile).

== See also ==
- Chapel of Santisima Virgen de Lujan, Antarctica
- Chapel of St. Francis of Assisi (Esperanza Base)
- Religion in Antarctica
