= Chapel of Our Lady of the Snows (Belgrano II Base) =

- Capilla de Nuestra Señora de las Nieves
- Chapel of Our Lady of the Snows
- Location: Belgrano II Base, Antarctica
- Denomination: Catholic Church

History
- Dedication: Mary, mother of Jesus

Administration
- Province: Bahía Blanca
- Archdiocese: Bahía Blanca
- Diocese: Río Gallegos

Clergy
- Archbishop: Carlos Azpiroz Costa
- Bishop: Pedro Ernesto Fournau

The Chapel of Our Lady of the Snows (Spanish: Capilla de Nuestra Señora de las Nieves) is an underground chapel excavated in a cave in the ice near the Belgrano II base, with an exact location of 77.87°S 34.63°W, in the territory it claims as part of Argentine Antarctica. It is one of eight churches on Antarctica, four of which are Catholic.

== Background ==
This church in a cave with walls made of ice is the most southern place of worship of any religion in the world, located 800 miles from the South Pole. It is a permanent Catholic church for the Argentina base and scientific research station founded in the 1950s on Coats Land. The original Belgrano base was opened in the 1950s, however the ice it was built on was unstable, so the base had to be rebuilt. The Belgrano II base opened in 1979, on around a hectare of nearby land which was free from ice. It was at this second base that the chapel was built, when a system of underground tunnels were excavated in the ice. Mass is celebrated regularly for those stationed at the research facility, and the chapel is accessible all year round.

Despite the physical location of the church, it falls under the Roman Catholic Archdiocese of Bahía Blanca, in Buenos Aires, with Carlos Azpiroz Costa as the Archbishop, and Pedro Ernesto Fournau as the Auxiliary Bishop.

== See also ==
- Religion in Antarctica
- Chapel of the Snows
