= Trinity Church (Antarctica) =

Russian Orthodox church on King George Island

Holy Trinity Church
- Церковь Святой Троицы
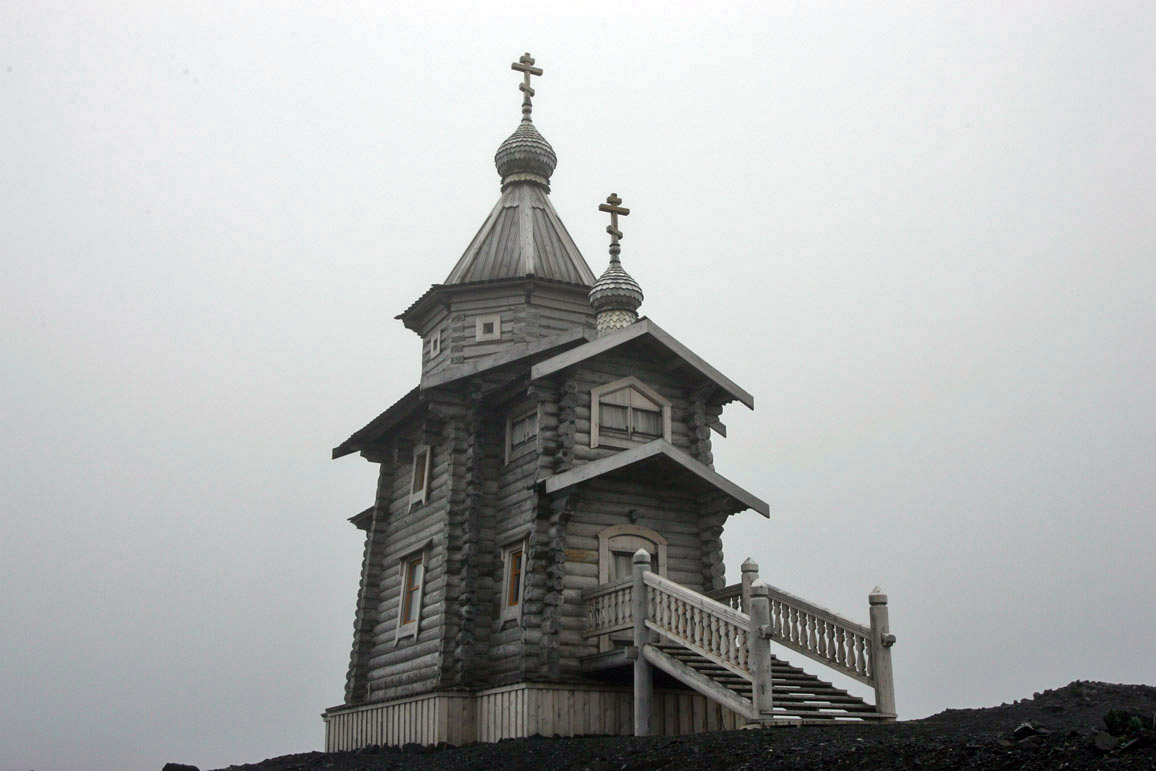
- Trinity Church in 2005
- Holy Trinity Church
- 62°11′47″S 58°57′35.3″W
- Location: Near Bellingshausen Station, King George Island
- Country: Antarctica
- Denomination: Russian Orthodox
- Tradition: Eastern Orthodox

History
- Status: Church
- Consecrated: 15 February 2004

Architecture
- Functional status: Active
- Style: Traditional Russian wooden
- Completed: 2004

Specifications
- Materials: Siberian Pine

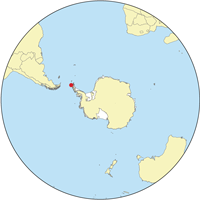
Location of King George Island

King George Island

Holy Trinity Church (Russian: Церковь Святой Троицы) is a small Russian Orthodox church on King George Island near Bellingshausen Station, a Russian research station in Antarctica. It is one of the eight churches on Antarctica and the southernmost Eastern Orthodox church in the world. (Note: The chapel dedicated to St. John of Rila at Bulgarian St. Kliment Ohridski Base is an Eastern Orthodox chapel located further south, and the Chapel of the Snows, Antarctica at United States McMurdo Station is the southernmost religious building in the world. Whether a chapel is a type of church depends on the definition.)

== History ==
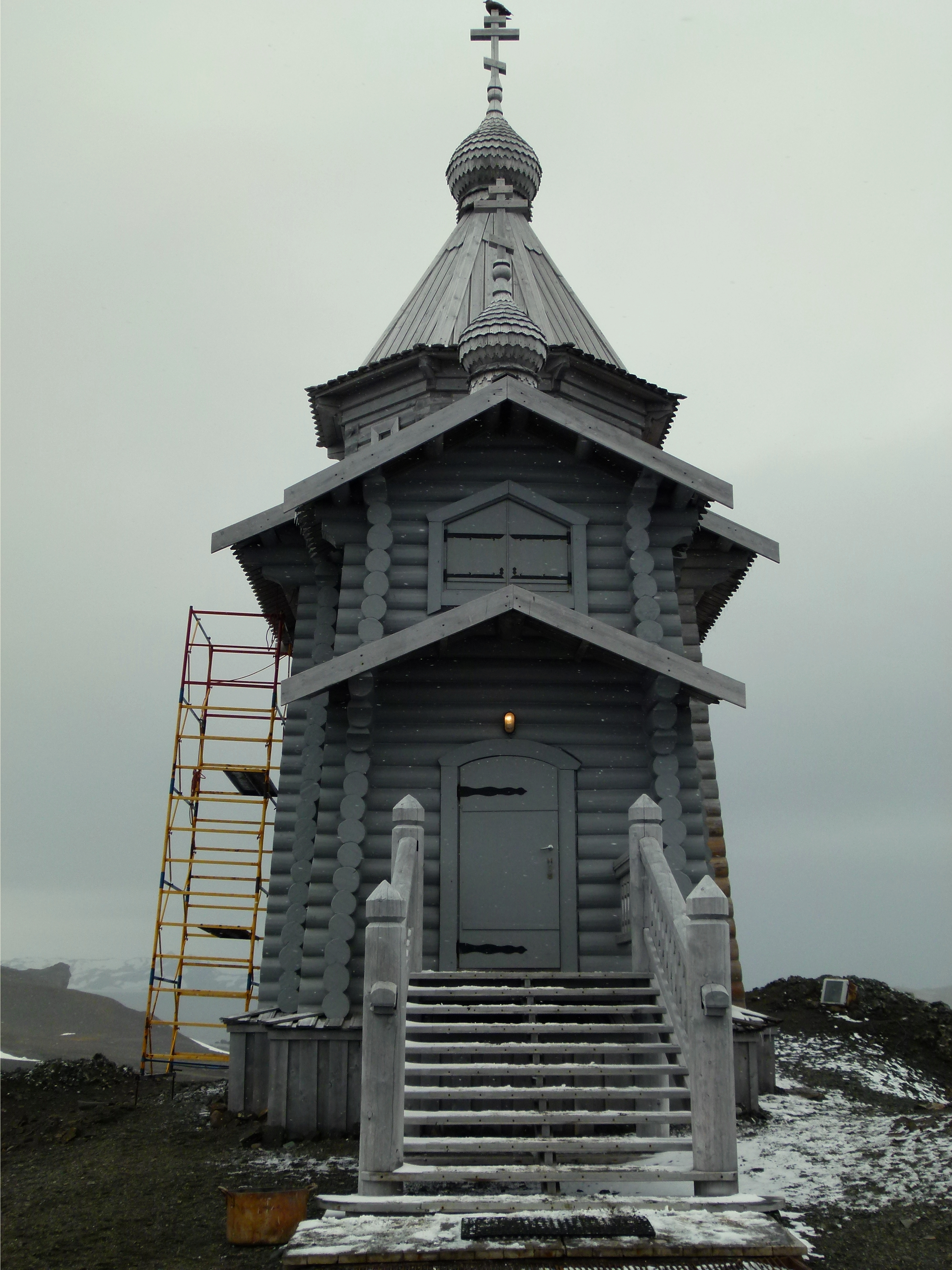
The exterior of Trinity Church in 2011

The project to establish a permanent church or monastery on Antarctica materialized during the 1990s. A charity named "Temple for Antarctica" (Храм — Антарктиде) was approved by Patriarch Alexius II and received donations from across Russia. They organized a competition for the project, which was won by architects from Barnaul: P.I. Anisifirov, S.G. Rybak, and A.B. Schmidt.

The structure was built from Siberian Pine by Altay carpenters led by K.V. Khromov, then dismantled, transported by truck to Kaliningrad, and shipped to King George Island aboard the Russian supply ship Academician Vavilov. It was assembled on high ground near the seashore by the staff of Bellingshausen Station, under the general supervision of the 30-year-old Father Kallistrat (Romanenko), who was to become the church's first priest.

The church was consecrated on 15 February 2004 by Theognost (Феогност), the Bishop of Sergiyev Posad and the Namestnik (abbot) of Troitse-Sergiyeva Lavra, who visited Antarctica for this occasion, along with several other clerics, pilgrims, and sponsors.

In 2016, Patriarch Kirill visited the church.

== Architecture ==
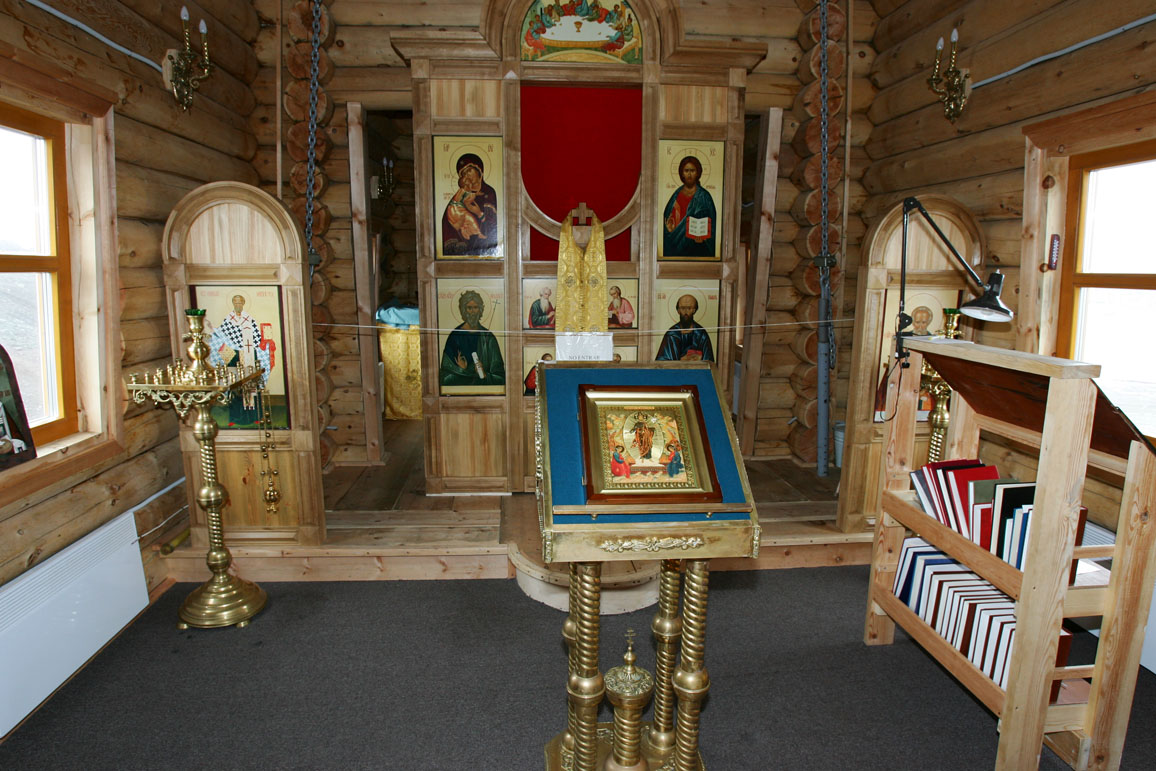
The interior of Trinity Church in 2005

The church is a 15-metre-high wooden structure built in traditional Russian style. It can accommodate up to 30 worshippers. Palekh painters created the iconostasis. The church bells were commissioned by the descendants of Sergey Muravyov-Apostol.

== Clergy ==
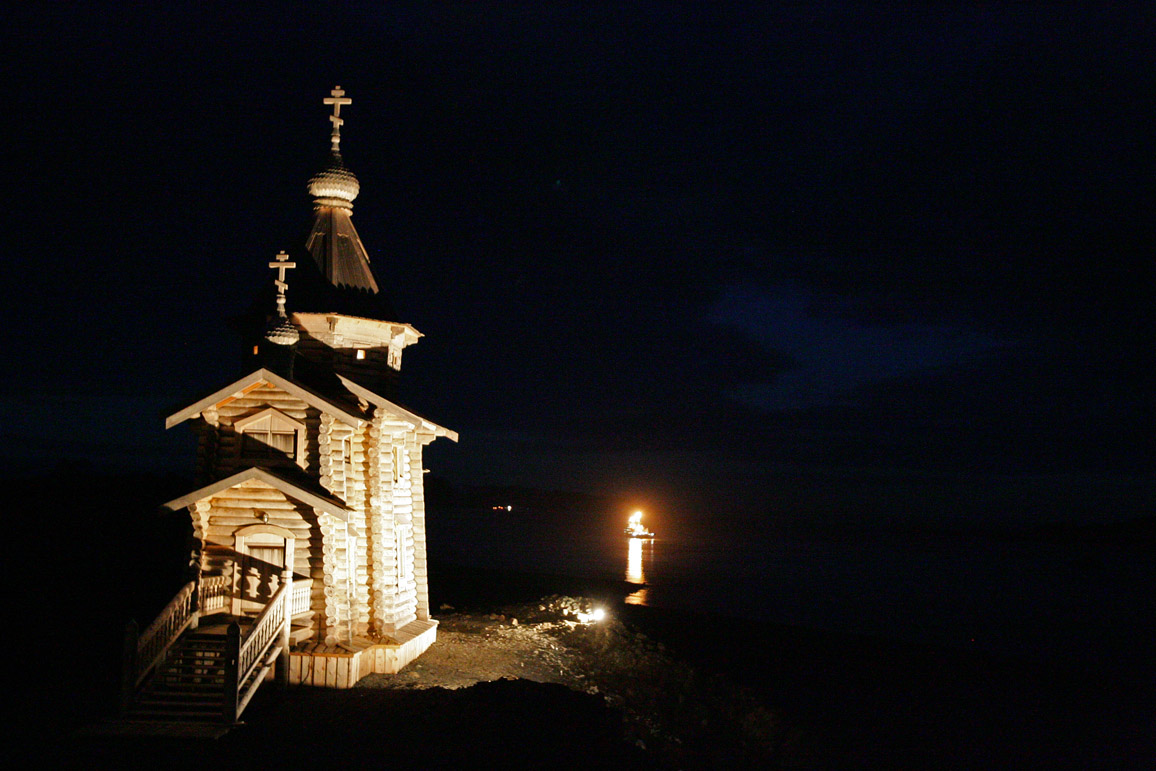
Trinity Church at night in 2005

The church is staffed year-round by one or two Orthodox priests, who are hieromonks of Troitse-Sergiyeva Lavra volunteering for the Antarctic assignment. Like the personnel of most year-round Antarctic stations, the priests are rotated annually by the Lavra; several of them, including Father Kallistrat, chose to return to King George Island for another one-year tour of duty after a year or two on the mainland.

Kallistrat, a hieromonk of Troitse-Sergiyeva Lavra, had previously served at the Lavra's skete on Anzer Island in the subarctic Solovki Archipelago.

== Activities ==
Among the priests' tasks is praying for the souls of the 64 Russian people who have died in Antarctic expeditions and serving the spiritual needs of the staff of Bellingshausen Station and other nearby stations. Priests also assist with the general maintenance of the Bellingshausen station.

Besides Russian polar researchers, the church is often visited by their colleagues from the nearby Chilean, Polish, Korean, and other research stations, as well as by tourists. For the benefit of Latin American visitors, some church services are conducted in Spanish.

On occasion, the priest baptizes new adherents of Christianity in the Southern Ocean.

On 29 January 2007, the priest of the church celebrated the first wedding at the church in Antarctica. The husband, Eduardo Aliaga Ilabaca, is a staff member of a Chilean Antarctic base, who had joined the Orthodox Church soon after the opening of the Antarctic temple; his wife, Angelina Zhuldybina, is Russian.

== See also ==
- Chapel of the Snows, Antarctica
- Religion in Antarctica
- St. Ivan Rilski Chapel
