= Religion in space =

Religious context during spaceflights

Astronauts and other spaceflight participants have observed their religions while in space; sometimes publicly, sometimes privately. Religious adherence in outer space may pose unique challenges and opportunities for practitioners. Space travellers have reported changes in the way they view their faith related to the overview effect, some said that their faith grew stronger. Conversely, some secularist groups have criticized the use of government spacecraft for religious activities by astronauts.

== Christianity ==
The Space Window (1973) of the Washington National Cathedral, incorporating a lunar rock. An example of space art as a way to deal with religion in space.

=== Apollo 8 Genesis Reading ===
The Apollo 8 Genesis reading.

On Christmas Eve, 1968, astronauts Bill Anders, Jim Lovell, and Frank Borman read from the Book of Genesis as Apollo 8 orbited the Moon. A lawsuit by American Atheists founder Madalyn Murray O'Hair alleged that the observance amounted to a government endorsement of religion in violation of the First Amendment, but the case was dismissed.

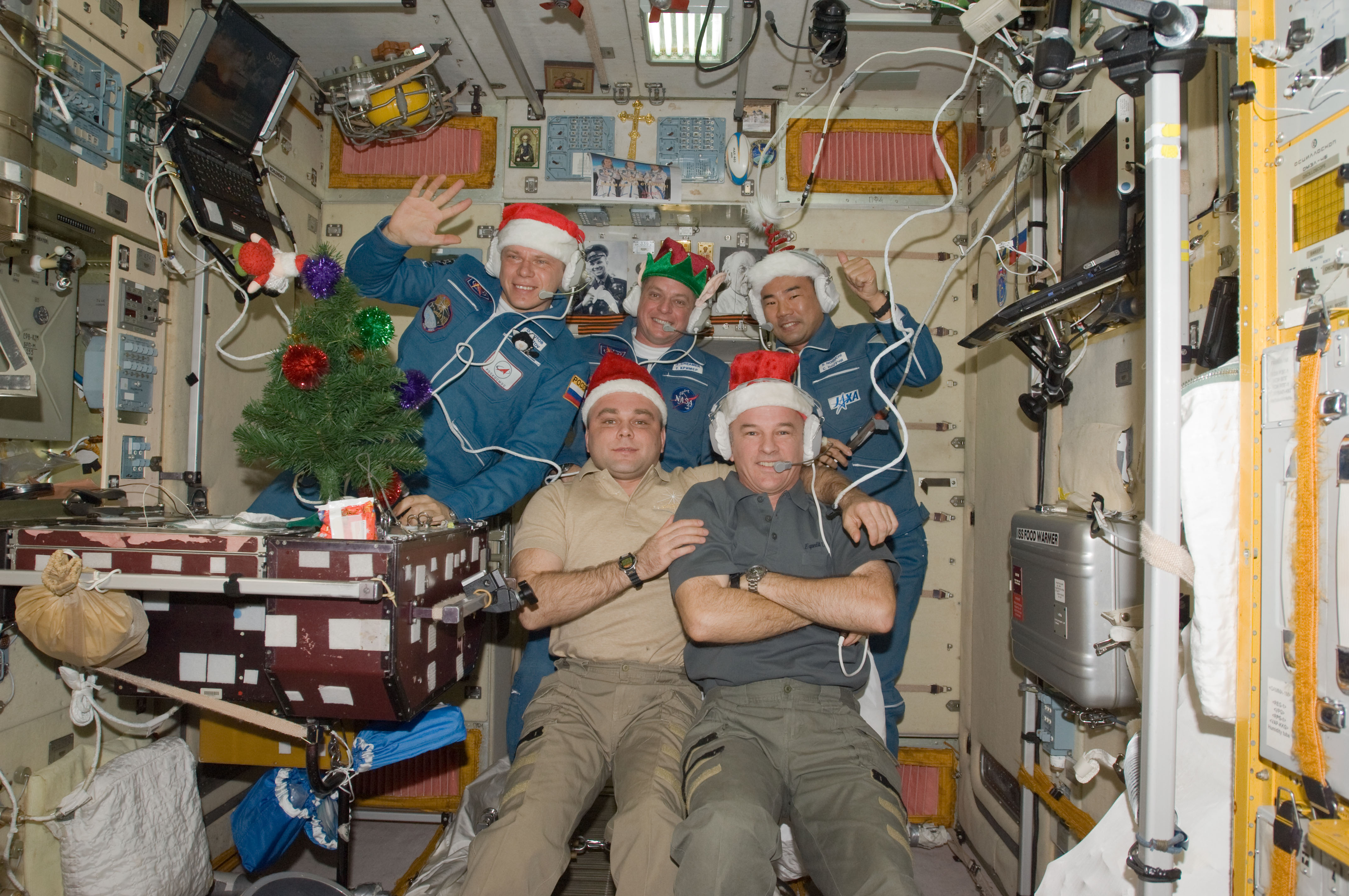
ISS crew with festive Christmas hats aboard the Zvezda service module of ISS in 2009.

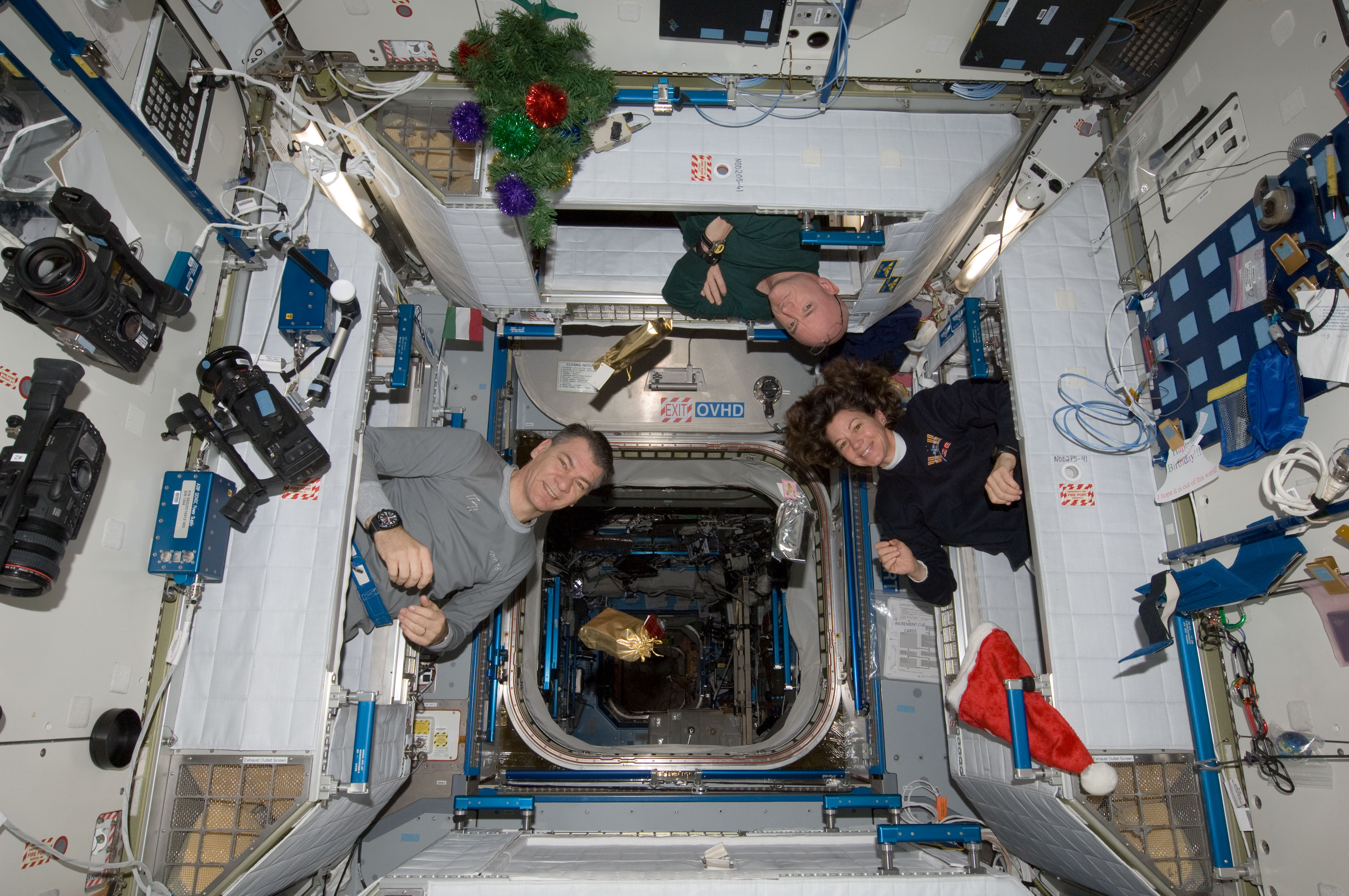
Christmas morning in Node 3 in 2010.

=== Protestantism ===
Apollo 11 astronaut Buzz Aldrin, an ordained Presbyterian ruling elder, celebrated the sacrament of communion in a small service for himself using a kit provided by his church. Aldrin had told flight director Chris Kraft of his plans and intended to broadcast the service back to Earth but opted not to at the request of Deke Slayton, due to the continuing controversy over Apollo 8's reading.

A microfilm Bible brought to the surface of the Moon by Apollo 14 astronaut Ed Mitchell was auctioned off in 2011. It was a King James Version created after three astronauts lost their lives in the Apollo 1 fire. Ed White, one of the astronauts who perished, had wanted to take a Bible to the Moon.

On the 2009 STS-128 flight to the International Space Station, astronaut Patrick Forrester brought a fragment of a Missionary Aviation Fellowship aircraft that had been used by the Operation Auca martyrs in Ecuador in 1956.

Several members of the crew of the Space Shuttle Challenger tragedy mission STS-51-L were people of faith. Among them were Commander Dick Scobee and Pilot Michael J. Smith. Scobee was a Baptist who met his wife June at a church social event. After the tragedy, she would go on to write an article in Guidepost Magazine about how their faith helped her through the tragic time. Smith and his family attended a non-denominational Christian church in a community close to their home near Houston's NASA JSC Space Centre. Similarly, mission specialist Ronald McNair was a devout Christian.

Rick Husband, the Commander of the ill-fated STS-107 Columbia tragedy mission, was also a devout Christian. On the last-request forms that astronauts fill out before every flight, he left his pastor a personal note: "Tell them about Jesus; he's real to me." Later his wife Evelyn wrote a book about their life with him as an astronaut and the importance of their Christian faith entitled High Calling: The Courageous Life and Faith of Space Shuttle Columbia Commander Rick Husband. Likewise, his STS-107 crewmate Michael P. Anderson was also a devout Christian and when not on a mission for NASA, was an active member of the Grace Community Church choir.

=== Catholicism ===
A signed message from Pope Paul VI was included among statements from dozens of other world leaders left on the Moon on a silicon disk during the Apollo 11 mission. Following the mission, William Donald Borders, Bishop of the Roman Catholic Diocese of Orlando, told the Pope that the 1917 Code of Canon Law placed the Moon within his diocese, as the first explorers had departed from Cape Kennedy which was under his jurisdiction. The claim was neither confirmed nor denied by the Pope, and the Moon is not recognized as part of the diocese in any official capacity.

Following Buzz Aldrin's communion on the Moon, other astronauts have done the same in Earth orbit. Three Catholic astronauts on Space Shuttle mission STS-59 received Holy Communion on 17 April 1994. NASA astronaut Michael S. Hopkins took a supply of six consecrated hosts to the International Space Station in September 2013, allowing him to receive the Eucharist weekly during his 24-week mission.

In May 2011, Pope Benedict XVI of the Catholic Church talked to the crew of the Space Shuttle Endeavour while it was in Earth orbit.

=== Russian Orthodox ===
In Russia, spaceflight crews are blessed by Russian Orthodox priests before launch, and their Soyuz rockets are also blessed on the launch pad. Cosmonaut Aleksandr Viktorenko initiated the crew blessing tradition when he requested one for the launch of Soyuz TM-20 in 1994.

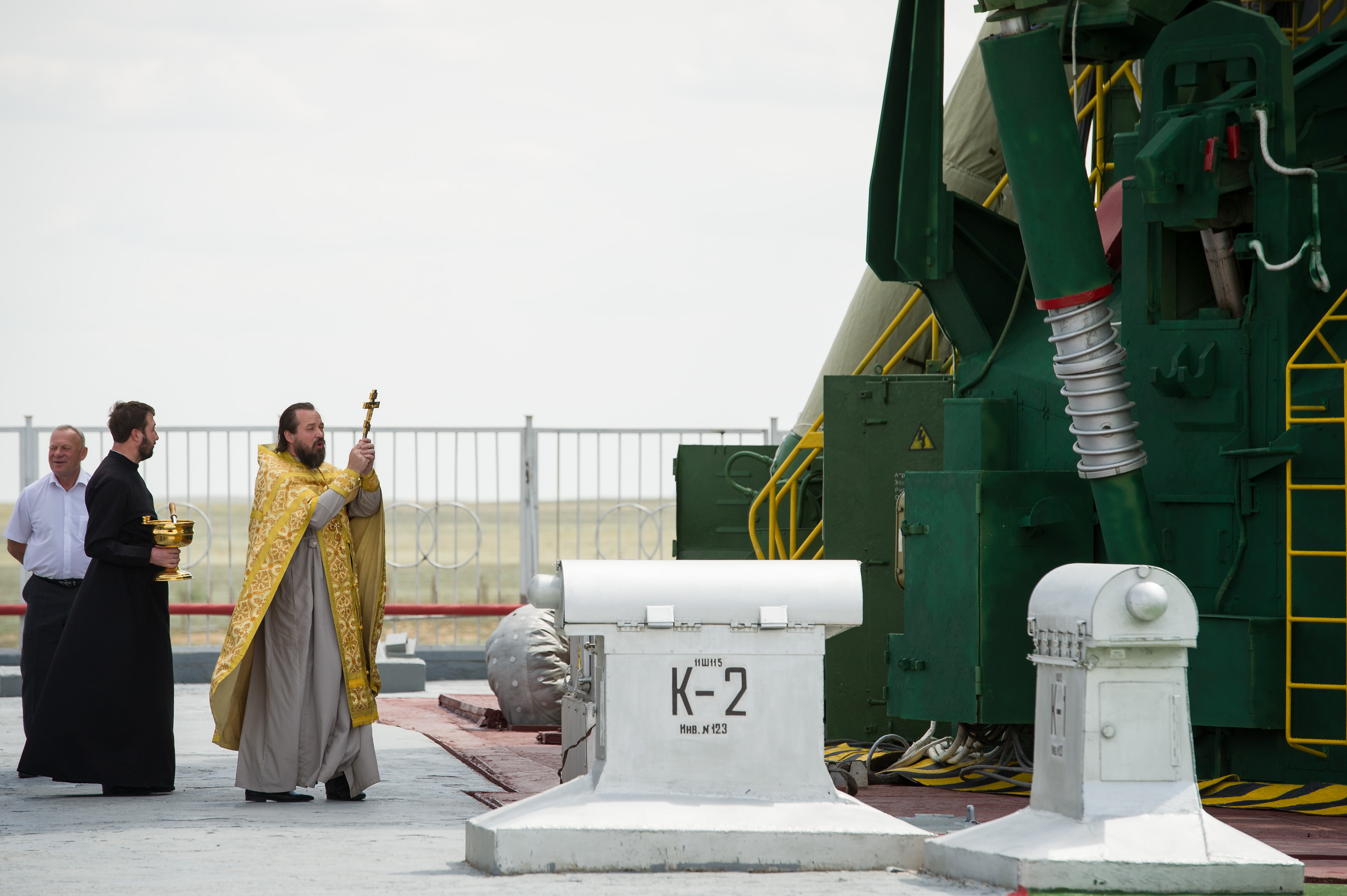
A Russian Orthodox priest blesses the Soyuz rocket for ISS Expedition 31

Russian Orthodox Christmas was celebrated on the International Space Station, on January 7, 2011. Cosmonauts had the day off, but one of the other crew posted on Twitter, "Merry Christmas to all Russia." The whole crew also celebrated on December 25, two weeks prior.

Cosmonauts sometimes at the request of the Russian Orthodox Church, carry religious icons to space, which upon return to Earth are distributed to churches.

== Islam ==
=== Islamic Jurisprudence of Space (Fiqh al-Fada) ===
A recitation of Surah al-Anbiya from the Quran; which contains verses related to celestial bodies and orbits. The Quran has been similarly recited various times in space.

Islamic law as it applies to space is called fiqh of space in Islam. Islamic scholars, space agencies, and religious councils have developed specific guidelines and fatwas to help Muslim astronauts navigate their religious obligations while in outer space. Muslims in space adapt to fulfil religious obligations, such as praying in a zero-gravity environment. The issue was first opened to debate with the flight of Saudi prince Sultan bin Salman Al Saud on STS-51-G and with Anousheh Ansari participating as a tourist on the International Space Station.

==== Religious Practices in Space (Fiqh al-Ibadah) ====
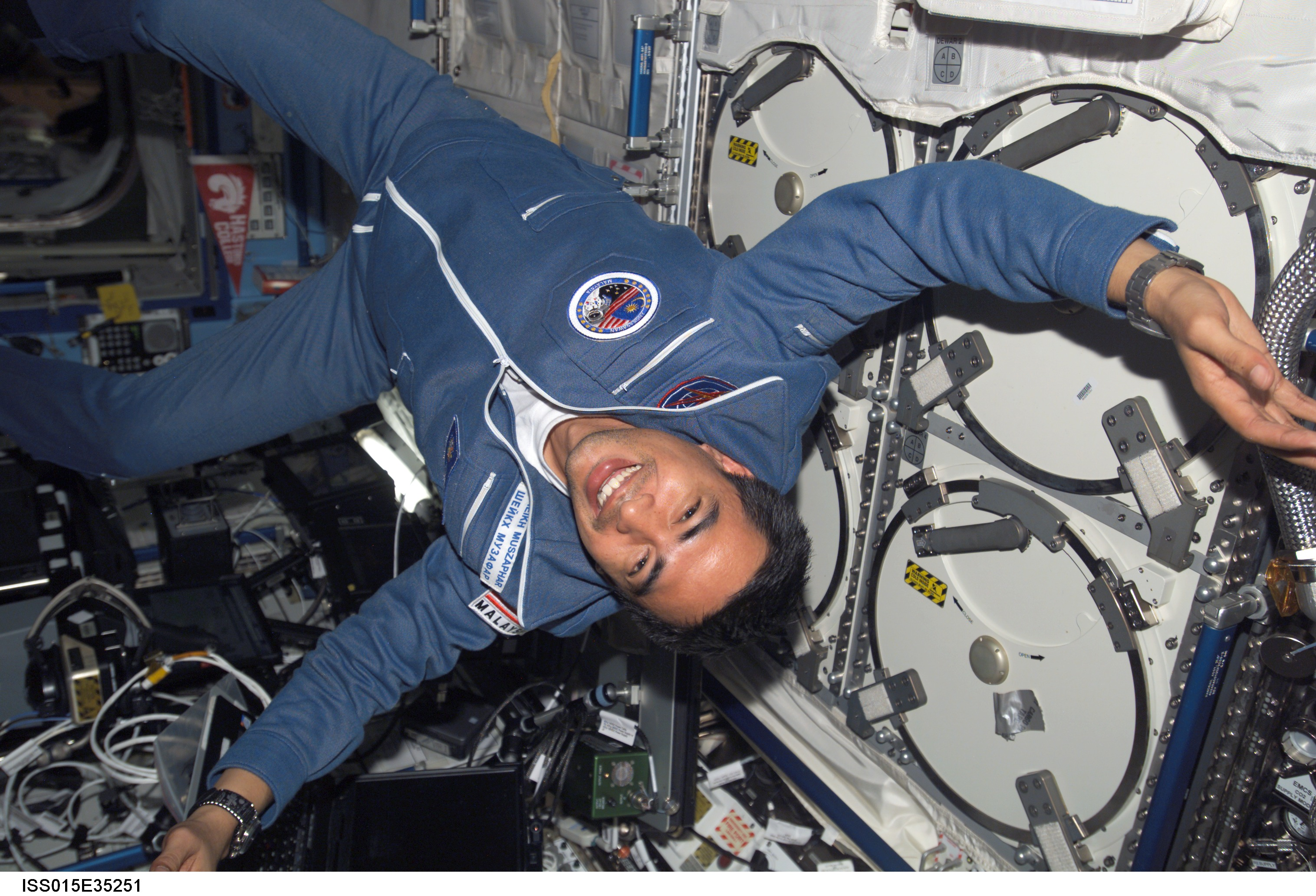
Muslim astronaut Sheikh Muszaphar Shukor, who requested a fatwa from the Malaysian National Fatwa Council, also threw a Ramadan party on the station.

Space travel poses unique logistical challenges to fundamental Islamic rituals, particularly the five daily prayers (Salat) and fasting (Sawm) during Ramadan, which are tied to the sun's position and Earth's geography. For instance, a spacecraft like the International Space Station (ISS) orbits the Earth at 27,600 km/h, meaning an astronaut witnesses a sunrise and sunset approximately 16 times every 24 hours, and the direction from the station to Mecca changes significantly within seconds.

After a meeting of over 150 religious scholars and scientists, the Department of Islamic Development Malaysia, which follows the Shafi'i school of Islamic jurisprudence, presented the guidelines as an 18-page fatwa. These guidelines were translated into multiple languages and now serve as a guide for Muslim astronauts in space. Diyanet, the Presidency of Religious Affairs of Turkey, which follows the Hanafi school of Islamic jurisprudence, also set guidelines for Muslim astronauts. The diyanet also posted job listings for astronomers and astronauts, possibly as advisors. Islamic scholars from Egypt and Guinea have also issued fatwas on how to perform prayers in space.

===== Prayer =====
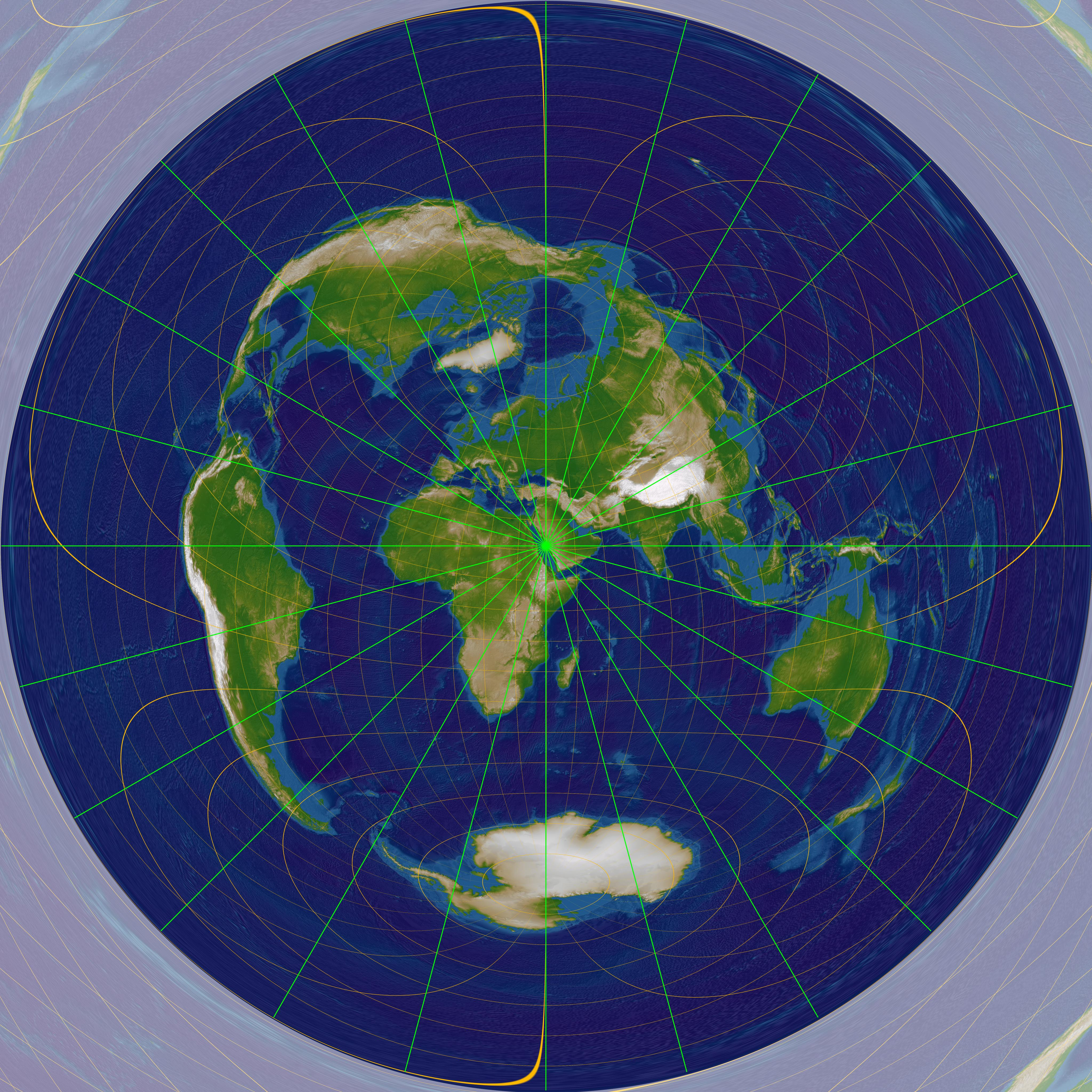
Equidistant azimuthal projection of the Kaaba.

====== Qibla ======
The Malaysian Council wrote that when determining the Qibla in space, one should base it on "whatever is possible". They proposed four options and deemed it appropriate to move to the next option if the preceding one is not possible:

1. The Kaaba
2. The position directly above the Kaaba at the altitude of the astronaut's orbit
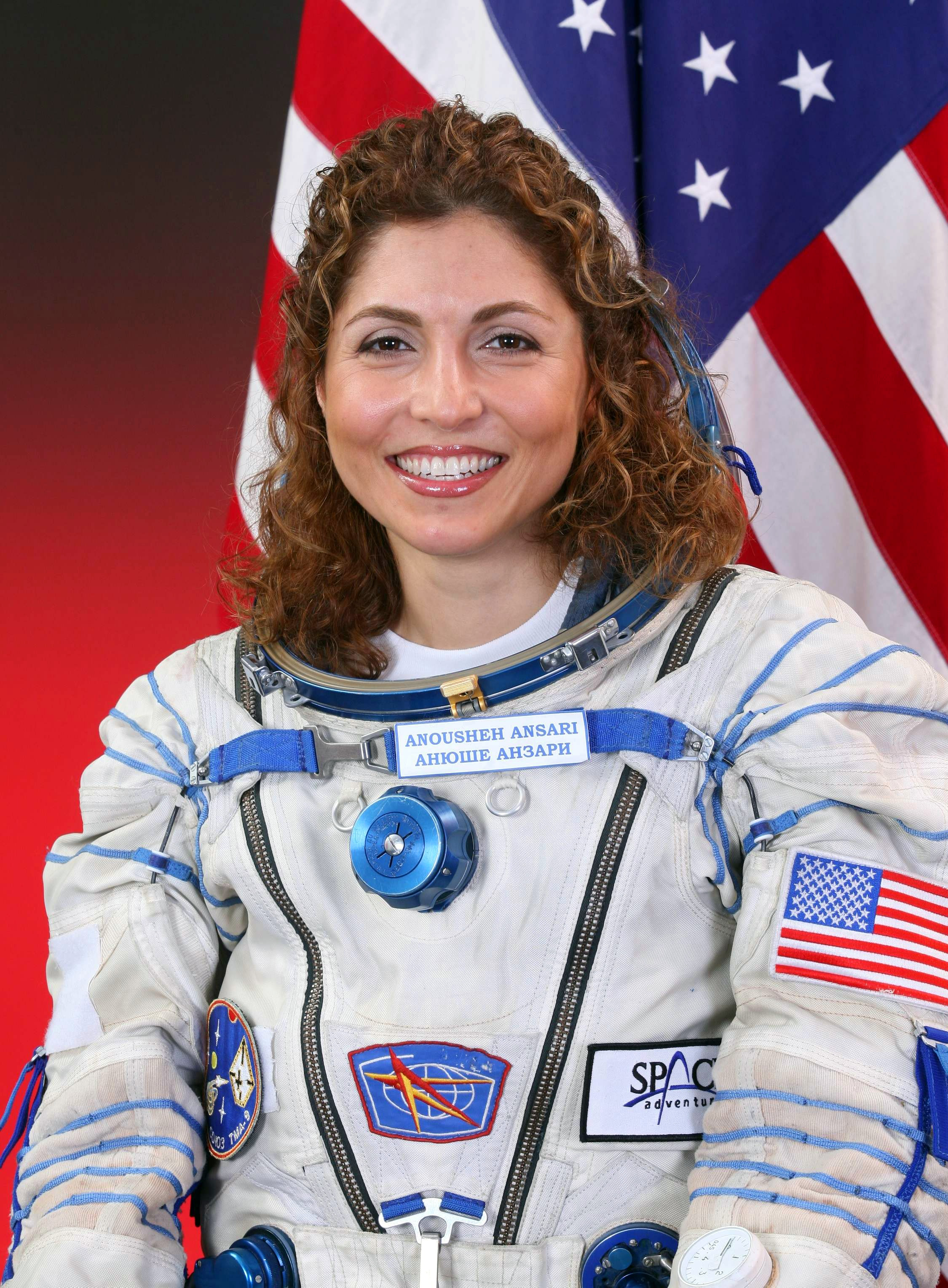
  Anousheh Ansari, the first Muslim woman astronaut.
3. Planet Earth
4. "Wherever possible"

The Turkish Diyanet ruled that simply turning towards Earth is sufficient.

1. Planet Earth
2. Whatever is possible

In line with the fatwa council, other Muslim scholars argue for the importance of flexibility and adapting the qibla requirement to what an astronaut is capable of fulfilling. Khaleel Muhammad of San Diego State University opined "God does not take a person to task for that which is beyond his/her ability to work with." Kamal Abdali argued that concentration during a prayer is more important than the exact orientation, and he suggested keeping the qibla direction at the start of a prayer instead of "worrying about possible changes in position".

Turkish scholar Necmettin Nursaçan gave a fatwa that praying is still mandatory for astronauts, though they count as travellers thus the obligations are lighter. He said that they should only try to face towards the Earth.

===== Ablution, bowing, and prostration =====
The Malaysian fatwa said that using a "wet wipe" would be sufficient for ablution (wudu) instead of washing completely. If this is also not possible, it was decided that symbolically "rubbing hands on a clean wall" (tayammum) would suffice. The Malaysian fatwa stated that prayers can be shortened or combined if necessary, and prayer times can be determined according to the last place the astronaut set foot on Earth, or all Muslim astronauts could pray at the same time. Mecca has also been suggested as an alternative by UAE scholars. Regarding prayer movements, the Malaysian fatwa explains that if it is not possible to physically perform them, scholars deemed it appropriate to perform bowing (ruku) and prostration (sujud) by "moving the chin up and down", and if that is not possible, by "looking up and down with the eyes". If none of these are possible, they ruled that simply "imagining the movements" would be sufficient.

Diyanet also agreed that tayammum would suffice for ablution, and suggested that one could "estimate" prayer times by dividing a standard 24-hour day into five segments. Diyanet did not publicly comment on how to perform the movements but ex-Diyanet vice president Necmettin Nursaçan said the astronauts can make tayammum and do the movements by moving their heads, he also commented in his fatwa that the prayer times can be based on Mecca.

Malaysian astronaut Sheikh Muszaphar Shukor spoke about his experience praying in space. He shared footage of himself praying in space, noting that the sun rises and sets every 45 minutes. He said that he read the Quran even more frequently after going to space and stated that he felt "spiritually closer to Allah". Furthermore, he also said that he heard the sound of the adhan (call to prayer) in space, calling it a miracle and attributing it to what he called "the majesty of Allah".

===== Ramadan =====
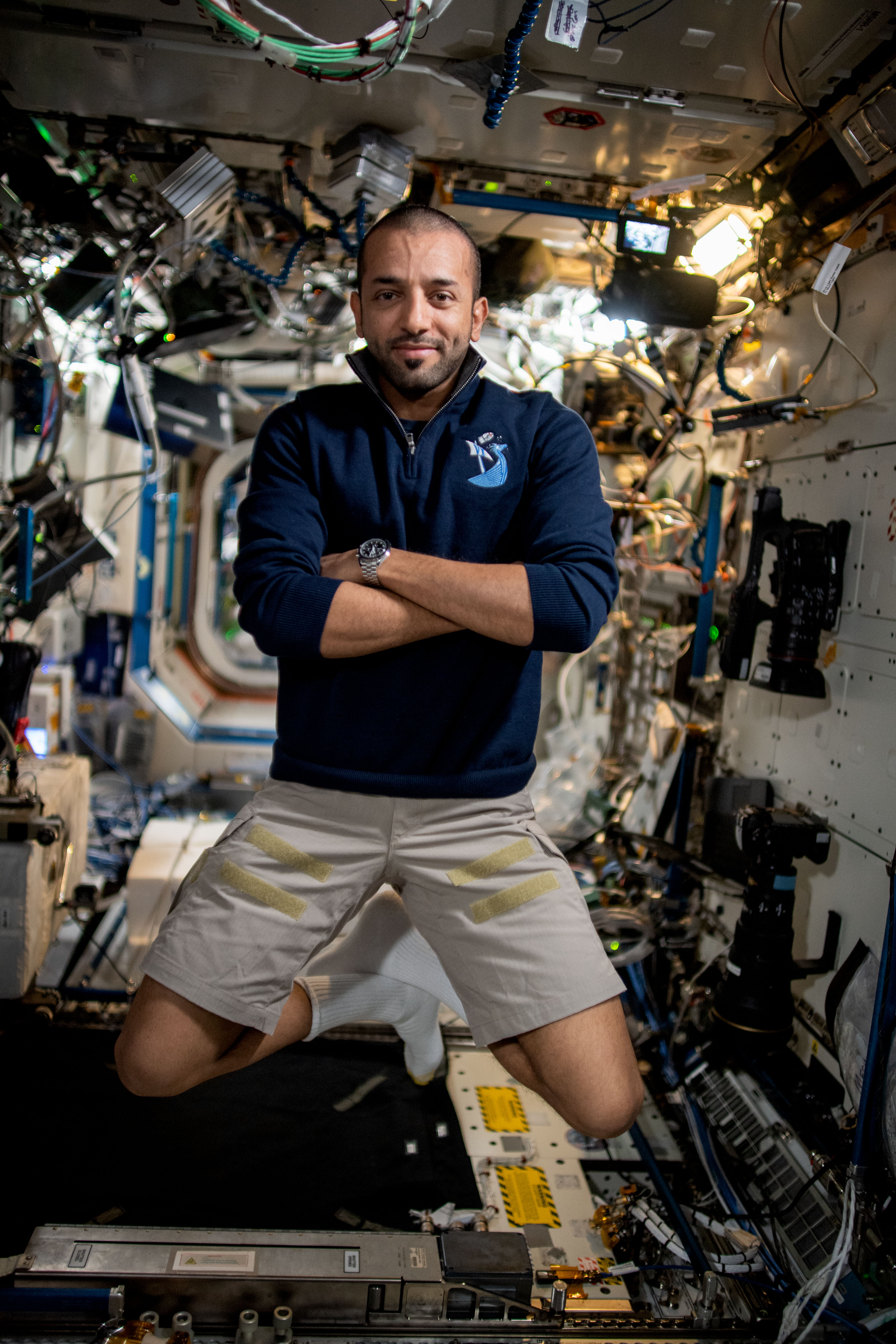
Muslim astronaut Sultan Al Neyadi celebrated Ramadan on the International Space Station.

Muslim astronauts in space celebrate Ramadan and Eid al-Fitr. Sheikh Muszaphar Shukor threw a party for the entire crew during Eid, handing out cookies and kebab.

====== Fasting ======
Islamic scholars ruled that since astronauts hold the status of travellers and fasting could harm their mission, it is not mandatory for them to fast, and the days can be made up upon returning to Earth. It was stated that Muslims who insist on fasting can do so according to Greenwich Mean Time. Furthermore, Muslims in space were permitted to eat food to satisfy their hunger even if they are not certain that it is halal. Some astronauts chose to fast regardless. Saudi astronaut Sultan bin Salman Al Saud, whose mission was during Ramadan, fasted, despite religious authorities telling him he did not have to.

==== Death in space ====
Islamic guidelines also stipulate protocols for the death of a Muslim in space. Ideally, the deceased's body should be brought back to Earth for a normal Islamic funeral. If returning the body is not possible, it is permissible to perform a simplified funeral ceremony and bury the body in space.

==== Islamic Views on Space Exploration ====
A recitation of Surah al-Rahman from the Quran

The Malaysian fatwa states that space travel is encouraged and Muslims should travel to space to "maintain a relationship with God, preserve the space environment, and maintain peaceful relations with others". Since Islam emphasizes the concepts of Tawhid (the oneness of God) and Khilafah (human stewardship of creation), Islamic thinkers emphasized space exploration must be conducted "equitably, sustainably, and responsibly". Space activities that promote monopolistic commercialization, extreme militarization, or the unchecked accumulation of space debris are seen as contrary to Islam. In modern Quranic exegesis, some scholars have interpreted specific verses as affirming human spaceflight. For example, in his translation The Majestic Quran, Sunni Islamic scholar Musharraf Hussain interprets verses 33 to 35 of Surah Ar-Rahman as a direct allusion to space travel. Hussain suggests that the "authority" or "power" (sultanin) required to pass beyond the regions of heaven and earth refers to the technological power of a space rocket, and notes that the verses' description of lashing flames and smoke resembles a rocket hurtling through the stratosphere. In the other hand, Turkish Islamic scholar Necmettin Nursaçan said that he is grateful to God that humanity could reach such scientific achievements and announced that he is praying for astronauts to conduct their research safely.

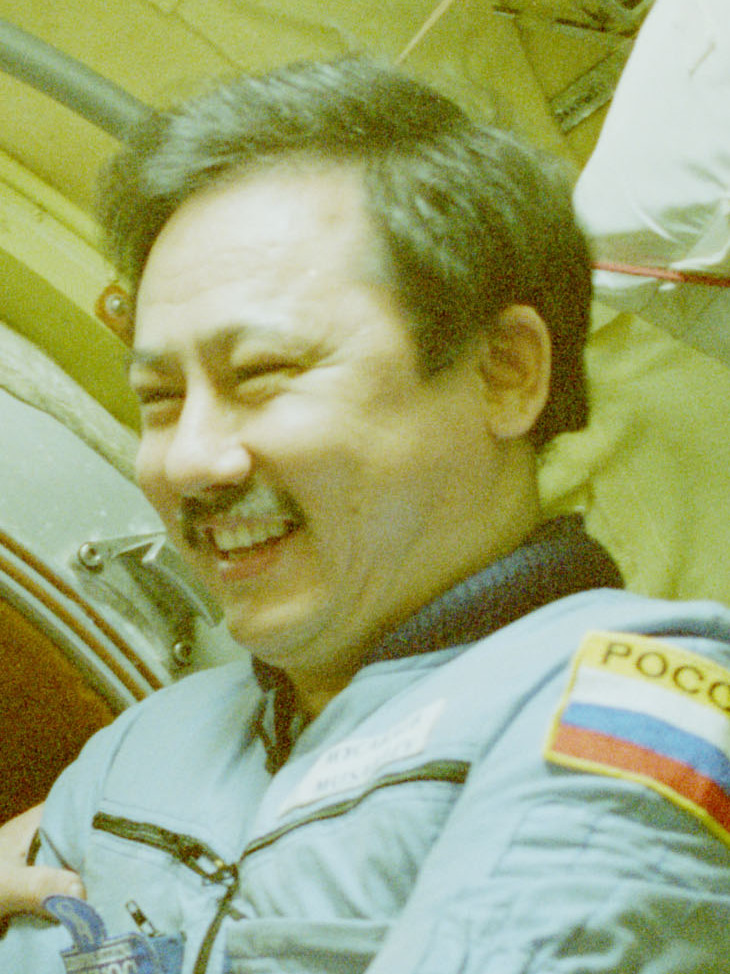
Talgat Musabayev, Kazakh Muslim astronaut.

Islamic bioethics also faces new theological hurdles in relation to space travel: long-duration missions may expose humans to extreme isolation, microgravity, and severe cosmic radiation. Some secular frameworks advocate for human genetic enhancement or alternative reproductive technologies (like artificial wombs) to survive extraterrestrial colonization. However, mainstream Islamic bioethics strictly rejects non-therapeutic genetic enhancement. Additionally, relying on artificial wombs or using sex robots to alleviate isolation are firmly opposed. Life-ending measures in extreme space emergencies are also forbidden; as euthanasia or assisted suicide is strictly prohibited under any circumstances.

Unlike temporary spaceflight and orbital missions, one-way missions to space have faced religious pushback. In 2014, the "Mars One" project proposed sending a crew of astronauts on a one-way trip to establish a permanent human colony on Mars, meaning the volunteers would never return to Earth. Some media alleged that in response, the General Authority of Islamic Affairs and Endowment (GAIAE) in the United Arab Emirates issued a fatwa that concluded that such travel to Mars amounts to suicide, which is not religiously permissible.

The alleged fatwa drew criticism from other Islamic legal experts, who argued it lacked scientific understanding of the mission's scope. Critics argue that if future technology safely guarantees survival, Mars would be highly compatible with Islamic worship; its 24.65-hour day allows for normal cycles of fasting and prayer. In contrast, Venus possesses a 243-Earth-day rotation where the sun rises in the west, presenting profound theological and logistical obstacles for Islamic habitation.

However, the existence of such a fatwa has been questioned. The GAIAE itself has distanced itself from it through the official Emirati News Agency WAM. Several articles have placed it in the context of anti-Muslim sensationalist reporting. The origin of the story can be found in the Khaleej Times of 19 February 2014.

Islamic Jurisprudence of Space (Fiqh al-Fada)
Group / Authority	Qibla (Direction)	Prayer Time	Prayer Movements	Ablution (Wudu)	Fasting
Malaysian Council	Turning anywhere towards planet Earth is sufficient.	Based on the last place on Earth the astronaut set foot (or all pray together); can be shortened or combined.	Pray by moving their heads; if not possible, simply imagine the movements.	Using a "wet wipe" is sufficient; if impossible,tayammum on a clean wall.	Exempt as travelers (make up days on Earth); if insisting on fasting, follow Greenwich Mean Time (GMT).
Turkish Scholars (Diyanet & Nursaçan)	Turning anywhere towards planet Earth is sufficient.	Estimate by dividing a standard 24-hour day into five segments, or base times on Mecca.	Pray by moving their heads.	Tayammum is fully sufficient.	Exempt due to traveler status (lighter obligations).
Saudi & UAE Scholars	Turning anywhere towards planet Earth is sufficient.	Base times on Mecca.	Not specified.	Not specified.	Exempt due to traveler status (lighter obligations).

=== Religious items and symbolism ===
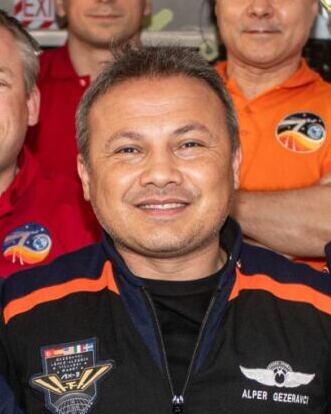
Alper Gezeravcı, Turkish Muslim astronaut.

Saudi astronaut Sultan bin Salman Al Saud brought a Quran to space, he also read the entire Quran during his mission and listened to Quran recitations before sleep. Afghan astronaut Abdul Ahad Momand also brought a Quran with him and recited it in space. Kazakh astronaut Talgat Musabayev was also among those who brought a Quran to space, the specific Quran he carried is preserved and on display at the Presidential Center in Kazakhstan. Malaysian astronaut Sheikh Muszaphar Shukor brought two Qurans with him, and gave one to his mother, and the other to the prime minister of Malaysia.

The first Turkish astronaut to go to space, Alper Gezeravcı, stated that he did salah ash-shukr (prayer of gratitude) in space and stated that "people should be grateful for gravity". He explained that the 8-pointed Seljuk star on his mission patch carried "significant meanings" and represents the "fundamental principles of Islam." Gezeravcı also stated that he found opportunity to engage in Islamic contemplation and encouraged youth to preserve faith, citing Islamic engineers and astronomers al-Jazari and Ali Qushji as inspiration. The Turkish government frames the pursuit of aerospace and technological dominance not as Westernization, but as a "reclamation" of the science and technology heritage of the "Turkish-Islamic past", citing figures such as al-Jazari, Hezarfen Ahmed Çelebi, and Ibn Sina. The pursuit of technology is framed as inherently Islamic. Turkish-Azerbaijani astronaut Tuva Cihangir Atasever brought a keffiyeh to space and pushed for seeing the world as a single "spaceship" without nations or borders. Muslim astronaut Anousheh Ansari commented that she sees faith and science as "very complementary". Emirati astronaut Hazza Al Mansouri's first words before liftoff were "We rely on the name of the almighty Allah". Both Sultan Al Neyadi and Rayyanah Barnawi commented looking at Mecca from space, and Barnawi added "praise be to Allah".

== Judaism ==
Jewish American astronaut Jeffrey A. Hoffman spinning the first dreidel in space and describing how he celebrated Hanukkah in space.

Time and date-related observances are important in Judaism, and there have been considerations on the observance of time by Jewish astronauts.

American astronaut Jeffrey Hoffman took multiple Jewish objects to space on his space flights from 1985 to 1996: a miniature Torah scroll, a yad, a Torah breastplate, mezuzot, menorahs, a dreidel, hand-woven tallit, and kiddush cups.

In January 2003, a microfilm Torah, a handwritten copy of the Shabbat kiddush, and a miniature Torah scroll rescued from the Bergen-Belsen concentration camp were taken to space by Israeli astronaut Ilan Ramon aboard the Space Shuttle Columbia. Ramon and the rest of the crew died when the shuttle disintegrated during reentry. In September 2006, Canadian astronaut Steve MacLean took another Torah from Bergen-Belsen aboard the Space Shuttle Atlantis to the International Space Station as a tribute to Ramon.

== Hinduism ==
Scholars compare modern space exploration concepts with ancient Hindu cosmology. The Atharva Veda describes fourteen worlds or lokas, including Bhu-loka, Svar-loka, and Satya-loka. Hindu sources also define the concept of ''Akasha'', which translates to space or sky. Some apply the Hindu concept of ''Dharma'' to outer space, applying the principle of ''Ahimsa'' (non-violence) and trusteeship to establish ethical rules for human activity outside of Earth.

In December 2006, American astronaut Sunita Williams took a copy of the Bhagavad Gita aboard the International Space Station. In July 2012, she took an Om symbol and a copy of the Upanishads. Her father, Deepak Pandya, recommended she bring the Upanishads to answer questions she developed after reading the Bhagavad Gita during her first flight. Williams also carried an idol of the deity Ganesha and celebrated the festival of Diwali while in orbit. On 27 February 2021, PSLV-C51 carried a digital copy of the Bhagavad Gita into space on an SD card.

== Buddhism ==
Ancient Buddhist cosmology posits a vast, centerless universe containing countless world systems. Early 20th-century figures, such as the Chinese monk Taixu, reinterpreted traditional cosmological symbols like Mount Sumeru in the context of outer space to frame a Buddhist vision of a decentralized cosmos. For Buddhist practitioners, space exploration and the resulting overview effect are sometimes seen as affirmations of paṭiccasamuppāda (dependent origination), the principle that all things exist only in relationship to others. The practical aspects of Buddhist philosophy have been studied as potential adjunct therapies for astronauts. Space medicine researchers have suggested that regular mindfulness and slow-breathing practices, derived from Buddhist traditions, can help astronauts regulate stress responses, increase cerebral blood flow, and enhance cognitive flexibility while in orbit and during post-flight recovery. As human missions to Mars and lunar bases become more viable, Buddhist environmental ethics are being adapted to address the treatment of extraterrestrial environments. Ethnographic studies of American Buddhists indicate a strong tendency to extend the precept of ahiṃsā (non-harm) and values like mettā (loving-kindness) and karuṇā (compassion) to abiotic landscapes, such as the lifeless rocks and regolith of Mars and the Moon. Practitioners advocate for the protection of extraterrestrial environments and express scepticism toward the unchecked ecological manipulation or terraforming of other planets solely for human comfort.

The first Buddhist to go into space was Ellison Onizuka flying to space aboard STS-51-C. Not only was he the first Buddhist but also the first Asian American, person of Japanese descent, and Hawaiian to go to space. Following his time in space, Onizuka spoke of viewing the Earth as a unified, interconnected whole. He later died during the Challenger Disaster in 1986.

== See also ==
- Astronomy and religion
- Astrotheology
- Religion in Antarctica
