= Belgrano II Base =

Belgrano II Base Base Belgrano II
- Antarctic base
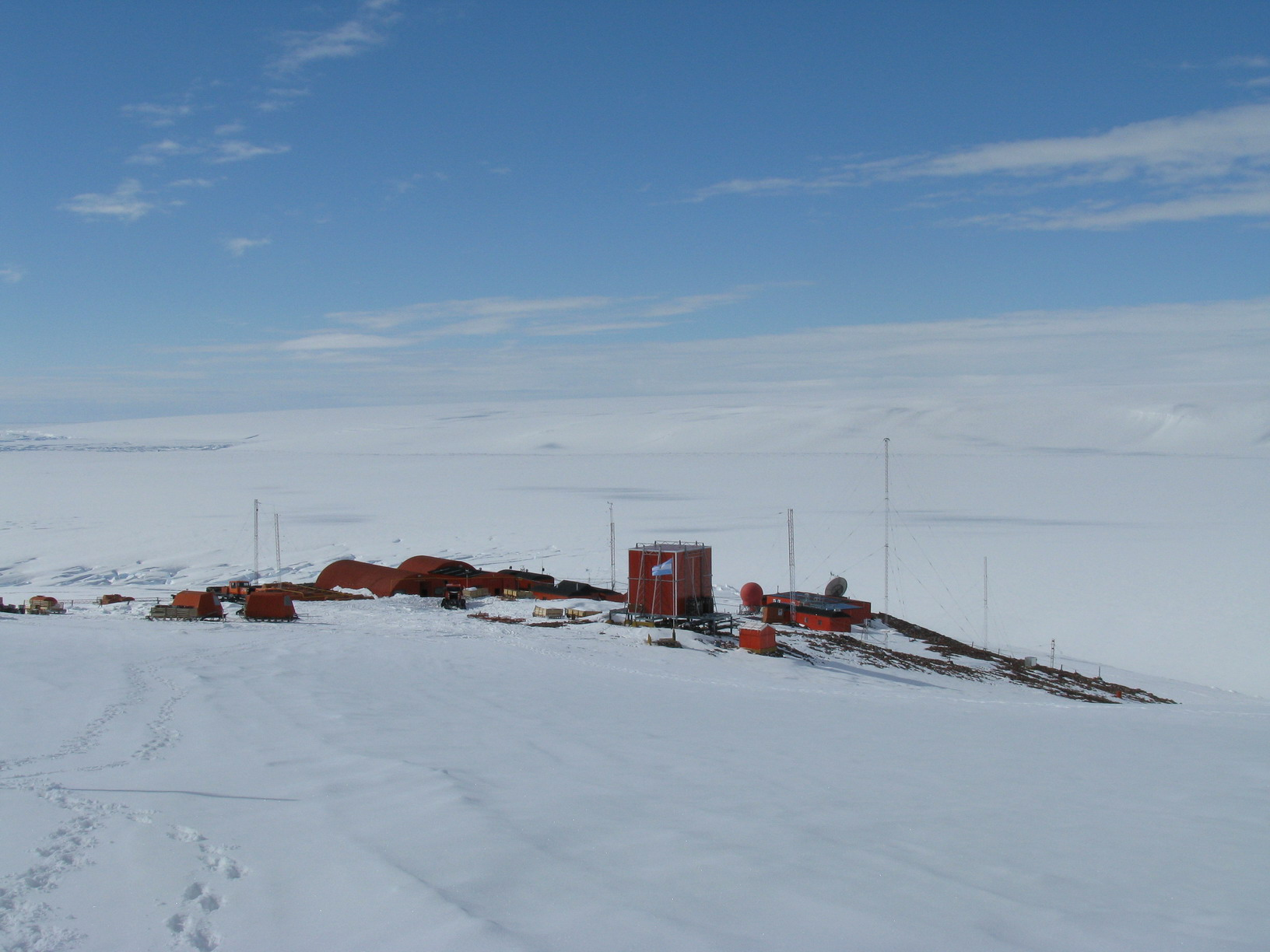
- View of Belgrano II, austral summer of 2007

- Location within Antarctica
- Coordinates: 77°52′25″S 34°37′39″W
- Country: Argentina
- Province: Tierra del Fuego, Antarctica, and South Atlantic Islands Province
- Department: Antártida Argentina
- Region: Confin Coast; Coats Land
- Location: Bertrab Nunatak
- Established: February 5, 1979 (1978–79 austral summer season)
- Named after: Manuel Belgrano

Government
  - Type: Directorate
  - Body: Dirección Nacional del Antártico
  - Operator: Instituto Antártico Argentino

Area
  - Total: 6 ha (15 acres)
- Elevation: 256 m (840 ft)

Population (2017)
  - Summer: 24
  - Winter: 19
- Time zone: UTC-3 (ART)
- UN/LOCODE: AQ BEL
- Type: All year-round
- Period: Annual
- Status: Operational
- Activities: List: Solar radiation; Seismography; Geodesy
- Facilities: List: Main house; Personnel houses; Emergency house/infirmary; Airstrip; Heliport; Chapel; Museum; Radio and satellite station; Power plant; Vehicle fleet; Vehicle garage; Laboratory (meteorology, astronomy, seismography, riometry); Workshop; Warehouses and deposits

Belgrano II Base (Spanish: Base Belgrano II) is a permanent, all year-round Argentine Antarctic base and scientific research station named after General Manuel Belgrano, one of the Libertadores and the creator of the Argentine Flag. It is located on Bertrab Nunatak on the Confín Coast, Coats Land.

As of 2022 it is Argentina's southernmost permanent base, the world's third furthest south permanent base, and the world's southernmost base built on solid rock, which makes it particularly suited for geological research.

As of 2022 Belgrano II is one of 13 research stations in Antarctica operated by Argentina.

== History ==
In 1955, then Brigade General Hernán Pujato founded the first Belgrano Base (Belgrano I), which remained for years as Argentina's southernmost settlement.

After 25 years of continuous activity, Belgrano I was closed due to the fast deterioration of the ice barrier it was sitting on; new, often hidden cracks and crevices endangered the on-duty personnel and material. In order to continue the scientific programs and keep Argentine presence in the area, and after careful studies on alternative locations done by the Argentine Army, it was decided to lay the new facilities on solid land. Amid the vast expanse of ice that covers the region, only two small masses of granite emerge: the Moltke and Bertrab nunataks, both first sighted and named by Filchner's expedition in 1912. Belgrano II was founded on 5 February 1979 over the latter, a hectare of permanently ice-free land. Also and despite being farther south and higher than Belgrano I, the climate was significantly milder.

The unloading of the materials—equipment, tools and instruments, food and fuel—was conducted from the icebreaker ARA General San Martín.

The new housing facilities were a vast improvement over the previous base ones: since 1955, the men who wintered in the old Belgrano I Base were living inside tunnels dug in the ice, ice that was always moving slowly towards the sea and, as finally happened, would become a tabular iceberg drifting through the Southern Ocean.

In its area of influence two Argentine-built refuges existed since long before: the Sargento Ayudante Cisterna y el Aviso ARA Comandante Zapiola shelters had been set up in January 1976.

In addition to new instruments brought from the mainland, Belgrano II received all its scientific equipment transferred from Belgrano I. The LABEL laboratory (LAboratory BELgrano) was rebuilt demanding considerable effort. A new facility, the José Luis Sersic polar astronomical observatory and a satellite dish antenna for data transmission were also set up.

On the morning of 10 September 2005 the main house was completely destroyed as a result of a fire caused by a heater malfunction. Personnel had to be distributed to other buildings and new food and clothes had to be brought from the mainland and airdropped as the fire had destroyed all the wintering elements. The construction of emergency facilities to solve the housing problem started in early 2006, This new building was planned in two stages with the first one (bathrooms, kitchen and bedrooms) being finished in 2006–07 and the second one (living room), in 2007–08. During the 2008–09 campaign the construction of a new main house began. It was completed during the 2009–10 campaign and was inaugurated on 25 May 2010. The new house has a covered area of about 500 m^{2} (5,400 sq ft) with more comfort and space for recreation: it is located on what was once the former home destroyed by fire.

During the repairs of the Argentine Navy icebreaker ARA Almirante Irízar which is normally used to supply the base, the Argentine Air Force took over the task with airdrops by KC-130 Hercules aircraft in a non-stop flight from Ushuaia in Tierra del Fuego.

=== Historic site ===
A cross was erected in 1955 some 1,300 m (4,300 ft) north-east of Belgrano I and subsequently moved to Belgrano II in 1979. This has been designated a Historic Site or Monument, following a proposal by Argentina to the Antarctic Treaty Consultative Meeting.

== Description ==
Belgrano II is about 1,300 km (810 mi) from the South Pole and 2,500 km (1,600 mi) from Ushuaia, the nearest port city. As of 2014 it is Argentina's southernmost permanent base, and the third further south permanent base in the planet. It is also the world's southmost base built on solid rock, which gives it unique advantages for seismological and geological research.

As a result of its latitude, the summer day and winter night are four months long and the night sky often displays the aurora australis.

As of 2014 Belgrano II is composed of a dozen buildings stationed on the nunatak rock, spanning a total area of 6 ha (60,000 m^{2}; 650,000 sq ft). Structures are mostly of composite panels covered by metal or fiberglass filled with polyurethane foam to provide adequate thermal insulation to resist low temperatures. Some of the facilities at the base are: main and personnel houses; emergency house/infirmary; airstrip; heliport; chapel; museum; radio station; meteorological station; power plant; vehicle fleet (several Tucker Sno-Cats and Yamaha VK-541 ski-doos); atmospheric research station; mechanical, carpentry and electricity workshop; general equipment and spare parts warehouses; and foodstuff deposits (also called GUM). The all-year capable airstrip is located on a glacier 2 km (1.2 mi) southwest of the base. The one-bed infirmary is 21 m^{2} (230 sq ft), attended by a doctor and a nurse. It has x-ray and odontological facilities. Dug in the nearby ice, Belgrano II's Catholic Chapel of Our Lady of the Snows is the world's southernmost Christian church—in fact, it's the southernmost worship place of any religion.

The general tasks of the base personnel are primarily of scientific research, survey and exploration, also providing support for foreign scientific efforts. Other common duties are shelter maintenance, search and rescue, medical, communications and weather forecast support to expeditions, bases, ships and aircraft, both local and foreign.

=== Scientific activity ===
The following research programs are run at LABEL:

- Meteorology forecast
- Atmospheric ozone research with high altitude probes and a Brewer spectrophotometer from the World Meteorological Organization, a joint program with Italy; and EVA IFAR spectrophotometer, a joint program with INTA in Spain
- Astrolabel, through optical telescope, an agreement with the Astronomical Observatory of Córdoba)
- Solar radiation and energy resources study through the local satellite station transmitting data in real time; since February 1998 a geodetic GPS receiver and seismological recording station have been installed through a joint program with the Alfred Wegener Institute of Germany;
- Seismography, operating the world's southernmost seismograph over firm rock
- Analysis of Earth's magnetic field variations
- Ionospheric and aurorae sounding research in cooperation with Italy
- Riometry, cosmic noise analysis
- Bird monitoring and nesting patterns
- Geodesy, through GPS and a Doris beacon

Although maintained by the Argentine Armed Forces, as all Argentine bases on Antarctica, it is operated by the civilian agency Argentine Antarctic Institute. As of 2010, the base has a 19 men crew two of whom are Air Force meteorologists, three are Argentine National Antarctic Directorate civilian researchers and the rest is Argentine Army personnel in charge of operating the base.

=== Climate ===
The Belgrano II base has a coastal-influenced ice cap climate.

The area is a passage of weather fronts directed towards the north: although they do not precipitate, they do produce strong winds exceeding 200 km/h (120 mph) which radically increase the chill factor.

Mean monthly temperatures range from −20.4 °C (−4.7 °F) in July, the coldest month to −2.4 °C (27.7 °F) in January, the warmest month. During summer, the average high is −1.2 °C (29.8 °F) while the average low is −7.7 °C (18.1 °F). In winter, the average high and low are −15.9 °C (3.4 °F) and −23.6 °C (−10.5 °F) respectively. During the polar night, a lot of aurorae can be observed.

Snowfall occurs throughout the year; on average, there are 143 days with snow. January to April are the snowiest periods of the year with each month receiving 13 to 14 days with snow.

Climate data for Belgrano II (1991–2020, extremes 1956–present)
Month	Jan	Feb	Mar	Apr	May	Jun	Jul	Aug	Sep	Oct	Nov	Dec	Year
Record high °C (°F)	11.4 (52.5)	10.1 (50.2)	7.9 (46.2)	1.5 (34.7)	−1.0 (30.2)	1.0 (33.8)	−2.9 (26.8)	−2.5 (27.5)	−1.4 (29.5)	4.4 (39.9)	7.0 (44.6)	12.1 (53.8)	12.1 (53.8)
Mean daily maximum °C (°F)	0.7 (33.3)	−3.5 (25.7)	−9.1 (15.6)	−13.2 (8.2)	−14.1 (6.6)	−15.7 (3.7)	−17.5 (0.5)	−17.1 (1.2)	−14.9 (5.2)	−10.2 (13.6)	−3.2 (26.2)	0.8 (33.4)	−9.8 (14.4)
Daily mean °C (°F)	−2.6 (27.3)	−7.1 (19.2)	−12.3 (9.9)	−16.4 (2.5)	−17.5 (0.5)	−18.9 (−2.0)	−20.9 (−5.6)	−20.7 (−5.3)	−18.4 (−1.1)	−14.1 (6.6)	−7.0 (19.4)	−2.7 (27.1)	−13.2 (8.2)
Mean daily minimum °C (°F)	−6.1 (21.0)	−11.1 (12.0)	−16.5 (2.3)	−20.5 (−4.9)	−21.6 (−6.9)	−23.0 (−9.4)	−25.0 (−13.0)	−24.9 (−12.8)	−22.8 (−9.0)	−18.8 (−1.8)	−11.5 (11.3)	−6.8 (19.8)	−17.4 (0.7)
Record low °C (°F)	−20.0 (−4.0)	−29.5 (−21.1)	−37.8 (−36.0)	−40.2 (−40.4)	−58.9 (−74.0)	−46.1 (−51.0)	−52.8 (−63.0)	−51.1 (−60.0)	−52.2 (−62.0)	−38.9 (−38.0)	−36.1 (−33.0)	−19.0 (−2.2)	−58.9 (−74.0)
Average precipitation mm (inches)	26.2 (1.03)	27.4 (1.08)	32.5 (1.28)	16.8 (0.66)	22.5 (0.89)	25.0 (0.98)	27.8 (1.09)	26.9 (1.06)	39.0 (1.54)	20.2 (0.80)	18.2 (0.72)	17.0 (0.67)	299.5 (11.79)
Average snowy days	12.8	11.0	12.8	10.6	10.5	9.8	10.5	9.2	10.7	9.6	10.0	10.7	127.9
Average relative humidity (%)	70	69	68	63	60	56	55	56	57	62	67	70	65
Mean monthly sunshine hours	229.4	172.3	114.7	30.0	0.0	0.0	0.0	3.1	66.0	173.6	252.0	282.1	1,323.2
Mean daily sunshine hours	7.4	6.1	3.7	1.0	0.0	0.0	0.0	0.1	2.2	5.6	8.4	9.1	3.6
Source 1: Servicio Meteorológico Nacional (precipitation 2001–2010)
Source 2: Deutscher Wetterdienst (humidity 1982–1995), Meteo Climat (record highs and lows)

== See also ==
- Argentine Antarctica
- List of Antarctic research stations
- List of Antarctic field camps
