= Erebus Chalice =

The Erebus Chalice is a silver and gilt chalice gifted to the National Science Foundation in 1987 for use in the Chapel of the Snows at McMurdo Station in Antarctica, where it is now kept on display during austral summers. At the time of its gifting, the Chalice was believed to have been carried aboard (and thus named after) HMS Erebus, which, alongside HMS Terror, was one of two ships of the Ross Expedition that mapped Antarctica in 1839–1843.

In 2006 the Canterbury Museum, Christchurch discovered that the chalice actually had been made in London circa 1910 and therefore could not have sailed aboard Erebus.
