= Chapel of St. Francis of Assisi (Esperanza Base) =

Coordinates: 63.4000°S 56.9833°W

- Capilla de San Francisco de Asís
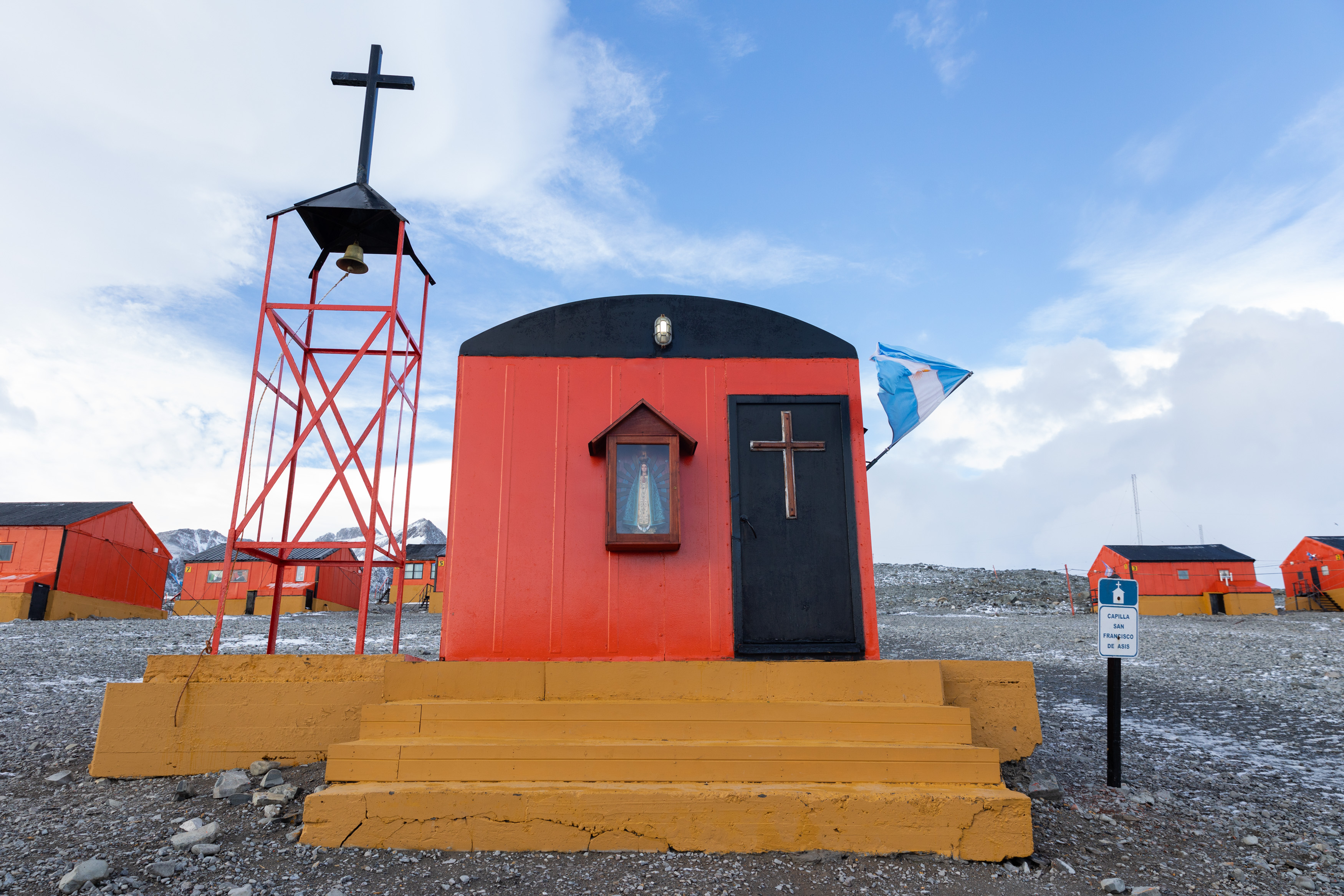
- The chapel with an image of Our Lady of Luján in 2022
- Chapel of St. Francis of Assisi
- Location: Esperanza Base, Antarctica
- Denomination: Catholic Church
- Sui iuris church: Latin Church

History
- Status: Chapel
- Founded: 18 February 1976
- Dedication: Francis of Assisi

Architecture
- Functional status: Active

Specifications
- Materials: Steel, wood

Administration
- Archdiocese: Roman Catholic Archdiocese of Bahía Blanca
- Diocese: Military Bishopric of Argentina

Clergy
- Bishop: Santiago Olivera

The Chapel of St. Francis of Assisi (Spanish: Capilla de San Francisco de Asís) is a chapel of the Roman Catholic church located on the Esperanza Base administered by Argentina on the northern tip of the Antarctic Peninsula in Antarctica. It is one of eight churches in Antarctica. Founded on February 18, 1976, and installed by the Argentine Army, it was the first Roman Catholic chapel on the Antarctic continent.

The chapel provides spiritual support to the residents and staff of the base. Its first priest was the Italian-born Jesuit Buenaventura De Filippis, and in 1978 the church was the site of Antarctica's first religious marriage, and the baptism of Emilio Palma, the first recorded birth in Antarctica.

After the election of Buenos Aires Archbishop Cardinal Jorge Mario Bergoglio as Pope Francis on 13 March 2013, a celebratory Mass was held at the church by Bernardo Conte Grand, military chaplain of the Argentine Army.

== See also ==
- Religion in Antarctica
