= Religion in Antarctica =

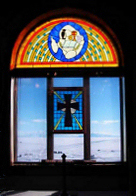
Chapel of the Snows, Antarctica

Religion in Antarctica is largely dominated by Christianity, with churches being the only religious buildings on the continent. Although used regularly for Christian worship, the Chapel of the Snows has also been used for Buddhist and Baháʼí Faith ceremonies. Some of the early religious buildings are now protected as important historical monuments.

Religious composition of Antarctica (2017)
1. Christianity (70.8%)
2. No religion (24.1%)
3. Islam (3.10%)
4. Hinduism (1.20%)
5. Buddhism (0.50%)
6. Others (0.40%)

== Beginnings ==
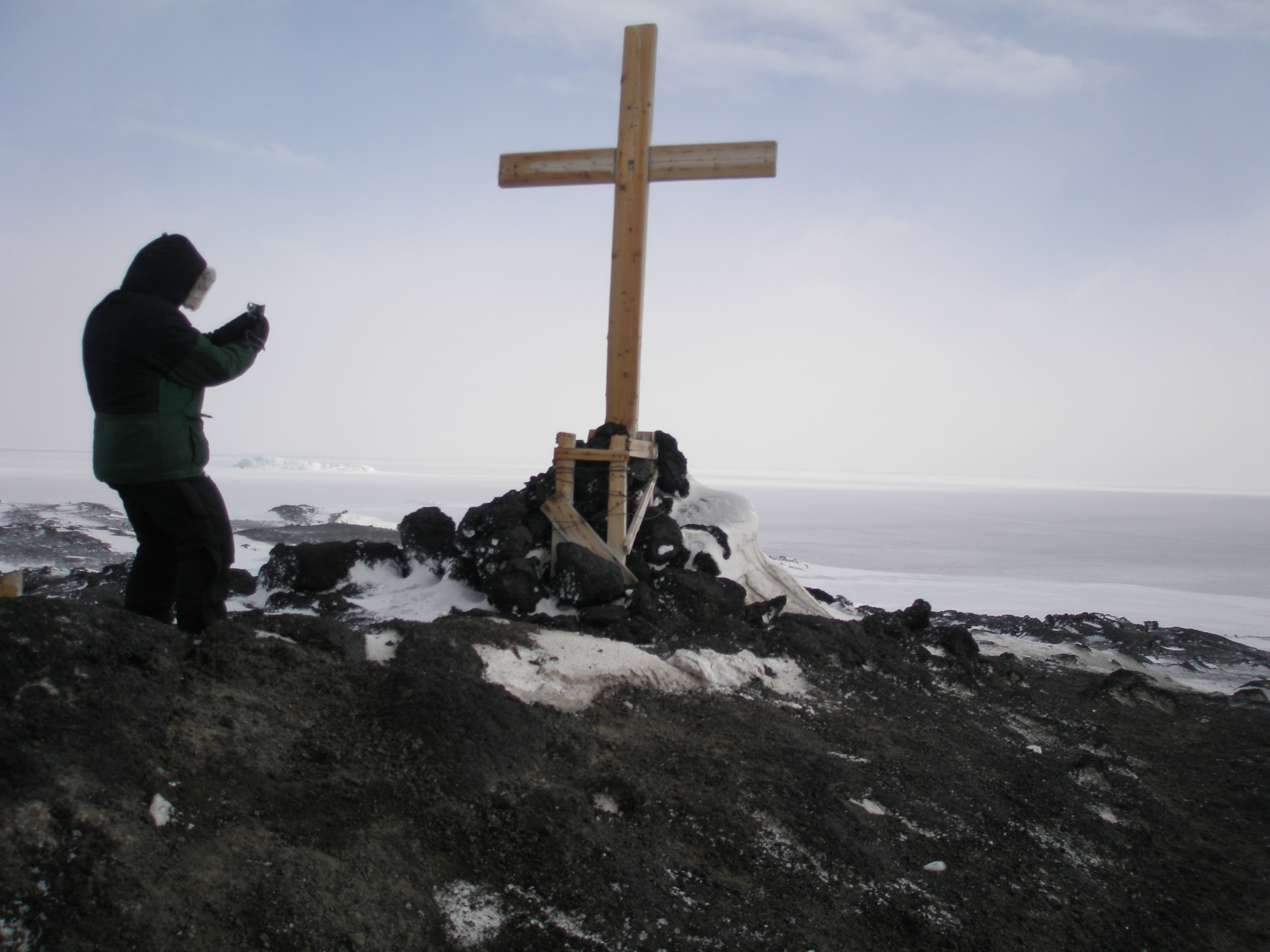
Memorial cross at Cape Evans

The first clergyman of any denomination to set foot on Antarctica was Arnold Spencer-Smith (1883–1916), an Anglican priest who was chaplain and photographer for the Ross Sea Party of Shackleton's Imperial Trans Antarctic Expedition. Spencer-Smith set up a chapel in Ponting's darkroom in Scott's Hut at Cape Evans. He arranged an altar with a cross and candlesticks and an aumbry where he reserved the Blessed Sacrament; he made a lamp to hang by the aumbry to indicate the real presence. In his diary, Spencer-Smith records when he celebrated Eucharist and how many were present. He also records when he heard confession on the continent. Spencer-Smith was the first clergyman to land in Antarctica, the first to celebrate the Eucharist and the first to die and be buried there.

A cross on Wind Vane Hill, Cape Evans, was erected by the Ross Sea Party, led by Captain Aeneas Mackintosh, of Sir Ernest Shackleton’s Imperial Trans-Antarctic Expedition of 1914–1917, in memory of three members of the party who died in the vicinity in 1916. The cross has been designated a Historic Site or Monument (HSM 17), following a proposal by New Zealand and the United Kingdom to the Antarctic Treaty Consultative Meeting.

On 20 February 1946, the first Catholic mass to be held in Antarctica took place at the Stella Maris chapel at the Argentine Orcadas station, led by the Spanish Jesuit Father Felipe Lérida. An 8-metre cross was erected and the pope was contacted by telegram.

The first Roman Catholic service in Antarctica was performed in 1947 by William Menster (1913–2007), Lieutenant Commander of the United States Navy during Operation Highjump. During a Catholic service held in a tent set up on land, he consecrated Antarctica. Ministering to approximately 2,000 men from a variety of Christian denominations gave him experience in leading ecumenical services.

Although they are used mostly for Christian worship, the Chapel of the Snows has also been used for Buddhist and Baháʼí Faith ceremonies. Some of the buildings are among historically important sites and under protection, such as the Chilean Captain Arturo Prat Base's wooden cross and a Statue of Our Lady of the Carmel.

== History (including the subantarctic islands) ==
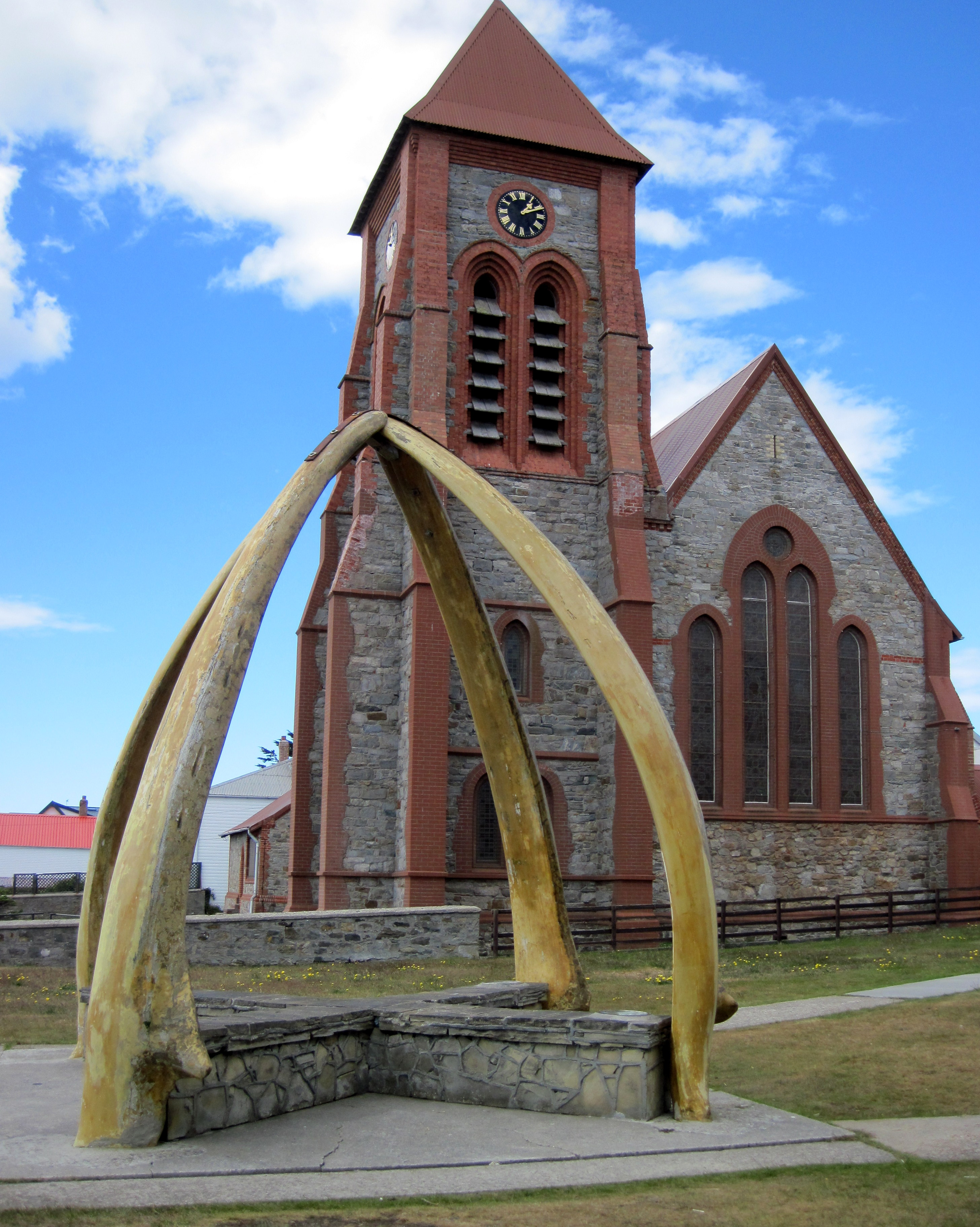
Christ Church Cathedral on the Falklands and whalebone arch

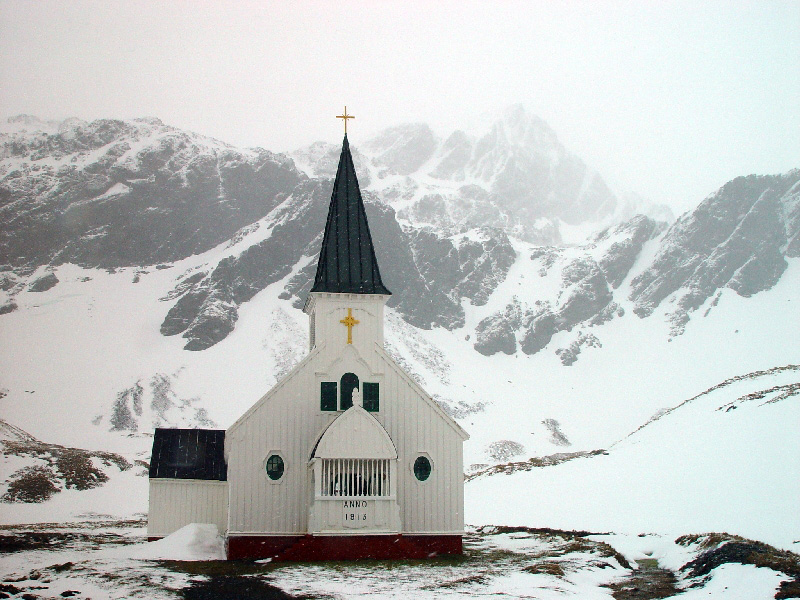
The Norwegian Lutheran Church at Grytviken, South Georgia

Around 1900, whaling stations and expedition camps were erected in the larger area. After World War II, some military expeditions explored the region. The International Geophysical Year (1957–1958) marked the end of a long period during the Cold War when scientific interchange between East and West had been seriously interrupted and has since contributed to civil scientific exploration. Since the 1950s, most stations in Antarctica have been constructed exclusively for scientific research. Extended stays in the region can be an extremely stressful experience for the researchers who often have been separated from their families for months at a time. Jesuits, who have had a long tradition of geophysical research in Antarctica, contributed as well to the early Antarctic missions. Notable Jesuit scholars like Edward A. Bradley, Henry F. Birkenhauer, J. Joseph Lynch and Daniel J. Linehan have been among those.

The first churches south of the Antarctic Convergence and north of 60° S latitude (and thus not part of the Antarctic Treaty System) are Notre-Dame des Vents at Port-aux-Français on the main island of Kerguelen and the Norwegian Lutheran Church, a former Lutheran chapel in Grytviken, South Georgia (since 1913). After years of abandonment and weathering the harsh elements of the region (roof damaged in 1994), the Grytviken church was renovated by the keepers of South Georgia Museum and volunteers in 1996–1998 and now serves for occasional church services and marriage ceremonies.

Some churches north of the Antarctic Convergence serve Antarctic territories, such as the Christ Church Cathedral in Stanley, which is the southernmost Anglican cathedral in the world. It serves as the parish church not only for the Falkland Islands, but also South Georgia and the British Antarctic Territory. Punta Arenas, at the southern tip of the South American mainland (just north of Tierra del Fuego), also has a Roman Catholic cathedral, which serves the Chilean Antarctic Territory.

Christians have increasingly turned toward Internet communications for fellowship in the 21st century.

== Notable buildings ==
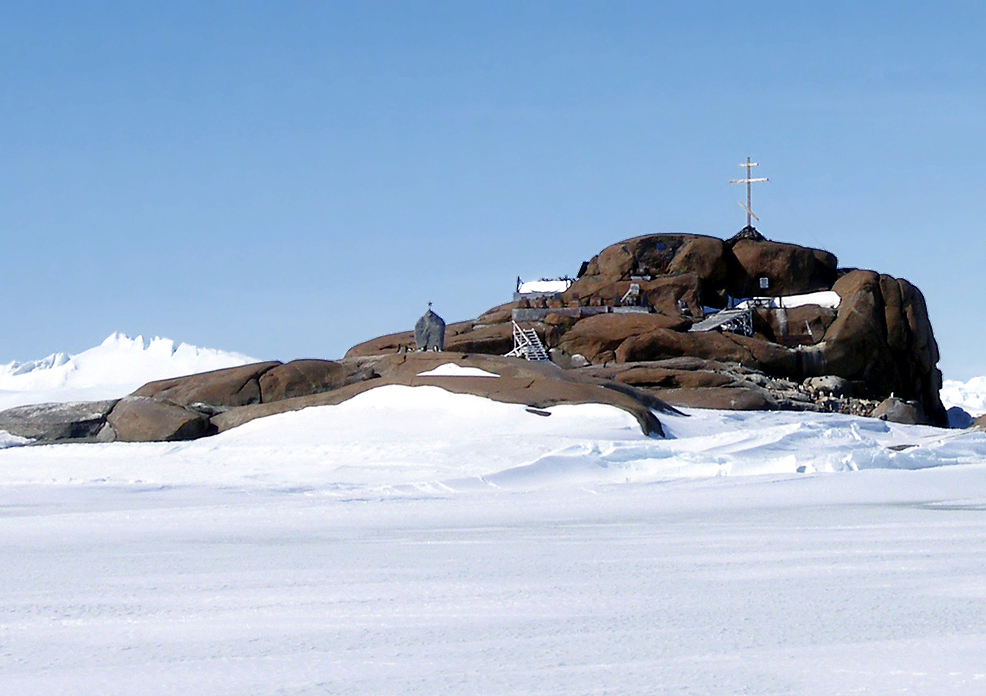
View of the cemetery on Buromskiy Island with its Orthodox cross and Ivan Khmara's Stone on the island

Out of nearly 90 stations in Antarctica, half are only used in the summer months. Most research stations have a small meeting room dual-purposed for religious assemblies. Larger stations and communities use a separate room, often a makeshift steel container for religious purposes.

The Chapel of the Snows was erected in 1956 as a Christian chapel used by several denominations at McMurdo Station, Ross Island. The Chapel offers various Protestant and Catholic services, but also allows for meetings of other religions, such as Latter-day Saints, Baháʼís and Buddhists and is used as well for secular groups (e.g. Alcoholics Anonymous). The chapel had been rebuilt after a fire in 1978 and was reconsecrated in 1989.

=== Catholic sites ===
The majority of Catholic Antarctic sites exist due to the Argentine presence on the Continent. The Worldwide Antarctic Program proposes building a Catholic chapel at Mario Zucchelli Station, Terra Nova Bay, Antarctica, while the first Catholic chapel (named after Saint Francis of Assisi) was built in 1976 at the Argentine Esperanza Base. The Chapel of Our Lady of the Snows is at the Argentine Belgrano II Base at Coats Land. It is a permanent Catholic chapel made entirely of ice.

Further dedicated religious buildings are the Chapel of Santisima Virgen de Lujan, Antarctica, a Catholic chapel at Marambio Base, Seymour Island, San Francisco de Asis Chapel, a Catholic chapel at Esperanza Base, Antarctic Peninsula and Santa Maria Reina de la Paz Church, a Catholic church at the Villa Las Estrellas, South Shetland Islands. Santa María Reina de la Paz is a repurposed container allowing for 36 persons to convene.

There is a small Catholic shrine near McMurdo Station called "Our Lady of the Snows". Popularly known as "Roll Cage Mary", the shrine was dedicated to a United States Navy Seabee who was killed during the construction of the station. It has been maintained by Carmelite nuns in New Zealand.

=== Eastern Orthodox Christian revival ===
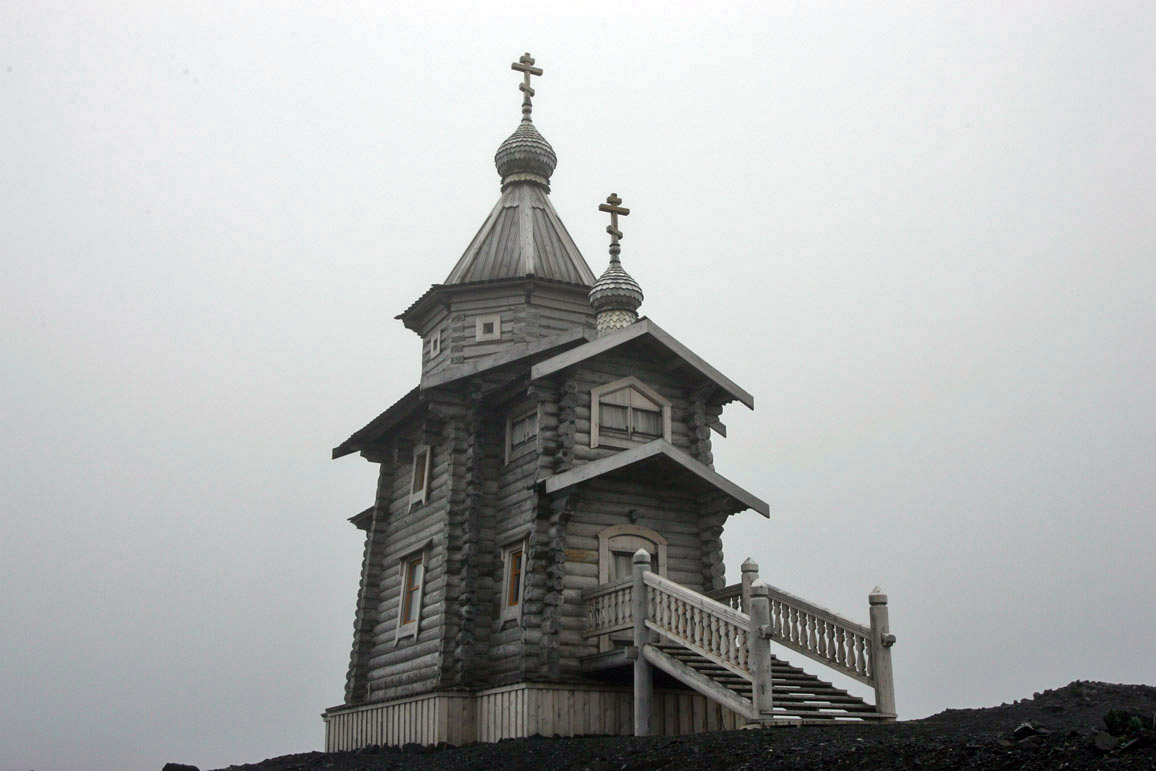
A view of Trinity Church, 2005

Religious activities were halted during the Soviet Antarctic Expedition. However, this changed with the fall of the Soviet Union and Communism within Central and Eastern Europe.

The St. Ivan Rilski Chapel, a Bulgarian Orthodox chapel at St. Kliment Ohridski Base, South Shetland Islands, was built in 2003 and is the first Eastern Orthodox edifice in Antarctica, and was the southernmost Eastern Orthodox building of worship in the world till 2011 when St Volodymyr (Vladimir the Great) Chapel at Ukrainian Vernadsky Research Base was erected.

The Buromskiy Island cemetery belongs among the most important monuments in the region. A Russian Orthodox cross has been erected in the meantime to mark the site. The island holds a cemetery for about 60 citizens of the Soviet Union, Czechoslovakia, the German Democratic Republic and Switzerland who died in the performance of their duties while serving as members of Soviet and Russian Antarctic expeditions. It has been designated a Historic Site or Monument (HSM 9) following a proposal by Russia to the Antarctic Treaty Consultative Meeting.

In 2002, Patriarch Alexy II of Moscow asked for a "Temple for Antarctica" (Храм Антарктиде) and initiated the Trinity Church, Antarctica, a Russian Orthodox church at Bellingshausen Station, South Shetland Islands. The Church is being positioned as a widely visible landmark and is maintained by the Moscow Patriarch. It was first maintained by a single priest. In the meanwhile two priests maintain the services, which are being exchanged annually. They both contribute to the maintenance of the overall station. 29 January 2007 saw the first church wedding on Antarctica, between a Chilean and a Russian. The first baptism (for adults) also took place there.

== Islam ==
While the Pakistani program at Jinnah Antarctic Station brought Muslims to Antarctica in 1991, there are no mosques on the continent or on any of the outlying islands, as there is yet no consensus as to observing Islamic religious customs.

It would also be impossible to fast for the month of Ramadan for an entire solar day during the summer in the Southern Hemisphere, so alternatives to this problem have been proposed by multiple sources. It has been reported that Muslim scientists on Antarctica use Mecca time for Ramadan fasting.

== See also ==
- Jewish law in the polar regions
- Religion in space
