= Chapel of the Blessed Virgin of Luján, Antarctica =

Roman Catholic chapel on Seymour-Marambio Island, Antarctica

Coordinates: 64°14′26.54″S 56°37′42.11″W

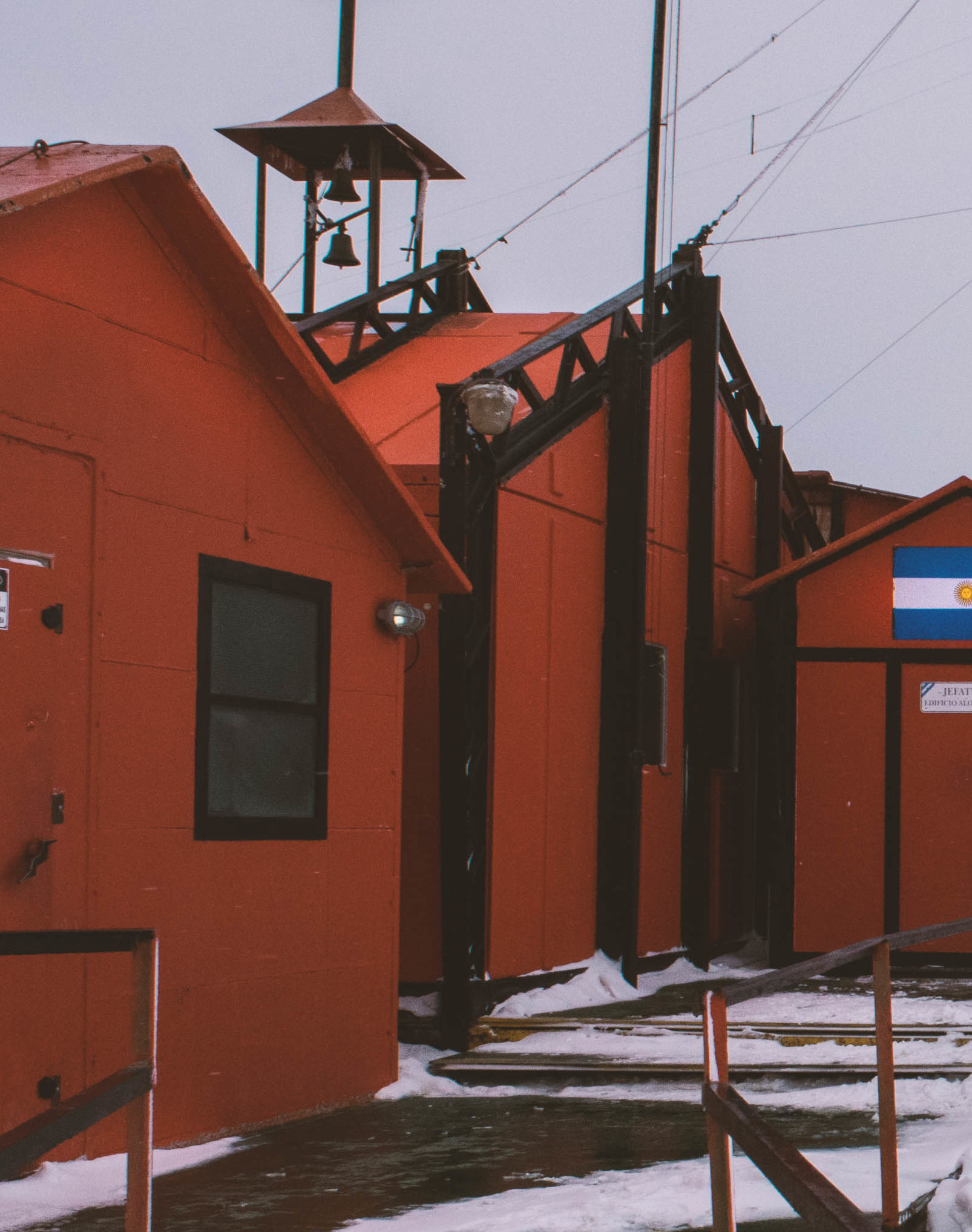
The belltower on the center building notes the Chapel of the Blessed Virgin of Luján.

The Chapel of Santísima Virgen de Luján or the Chapel of the Blessed Virgin of Luján (Spanish: Capilla de la Santísima Virgen de Luján) is a Roman Catholic chapel located at the Argentine base Marambio on Seymour-Marambio Island in Antarctica. It is the third most southern place of worship of any religion. It is one of eight churches on Antarctica. The permanent steel-structured chapel is used for Christian worship by the various Argentine personnel on station (as well as visitors). The chapel features a bell tower and cross.

== See also ==
- Religion in Antarctica
