= Moltke Nunataks =

Group of nunataks in Antarctica

The Moltke Nunataks (77°58′S 35°30′W) are a chain of north–south trending nunataks close to the northeastern end of the Filchner Ice Shelf, Antarctica. One nunatak was first roughly mapped and named "Moltke Nunatak" by the Second German Antarctic Expedition of 1911–12 under Wilhelm Filchner. He named it for General Helmuth von Moltke, Chief of the German General Staff and Secretary of State for Home Affairs. Surveys during the mid-1950s by British, Argentine and United States expeditions indicate that a group of four or five nunataks exist in the area.
