= Chapel of the Snows =

American church at McMurdo Station in Antarctica

Coordinates: 77°51′S 166°40′E

The Chapel of the Snows
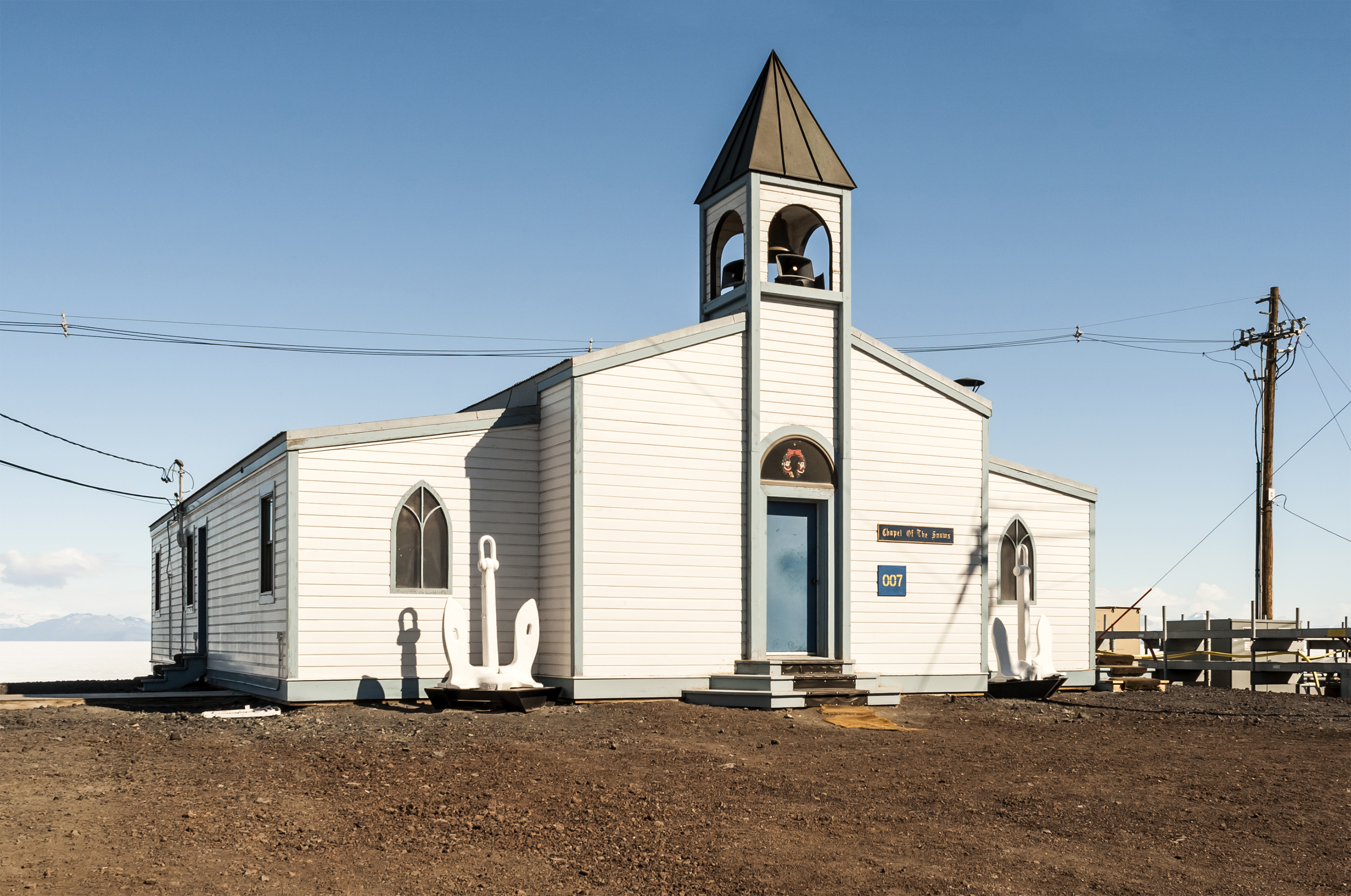
- The Chapel of the Snows, 2008

Religion
- Affiliation: Christianity (Catholic, Latter Day Saints, Protestant)
- Region: McMurdo Sound (Ross Island)
- Ecclesiastical or organisational status: Active
- Year consecrated: 1956

Location
- Location: Antarctica
- Municipality: McMurdo Station
- State: Antarctic Treaty System
- Interactive map of The Chapel of the Snows
- Territory: Antarctica

Architecture
- Type: Church
- Style: Modern
- Funded by: United States Government
- Completed: 1956 (destroyed by fire in 1978, rebuilt in 1989)

Specifications
- Capacity: 63
- Dome: 0
- Spire: 1
- Materials: Wood

The Chapel of the Snows is a non-denominational Christian church at the United States' McMurdo Station on Ross Island, Antarctica. Initially built from scrap material in 1956, it burned down in 1978 and was rebuilt in 1989. It is one of eight churches on Antarctica and the only interfaith church there, having both Protestant and Catholic services. In addition, the Church also hosts several other religious groups and community organizations, including a sobriety group. Each year the famed Erebus Chalice is brought down for the austral summer.

The church is noted for its southerly religious location and unique architectural flourishes, such as penguins in the stained glass windows.

== Operations and structure ==
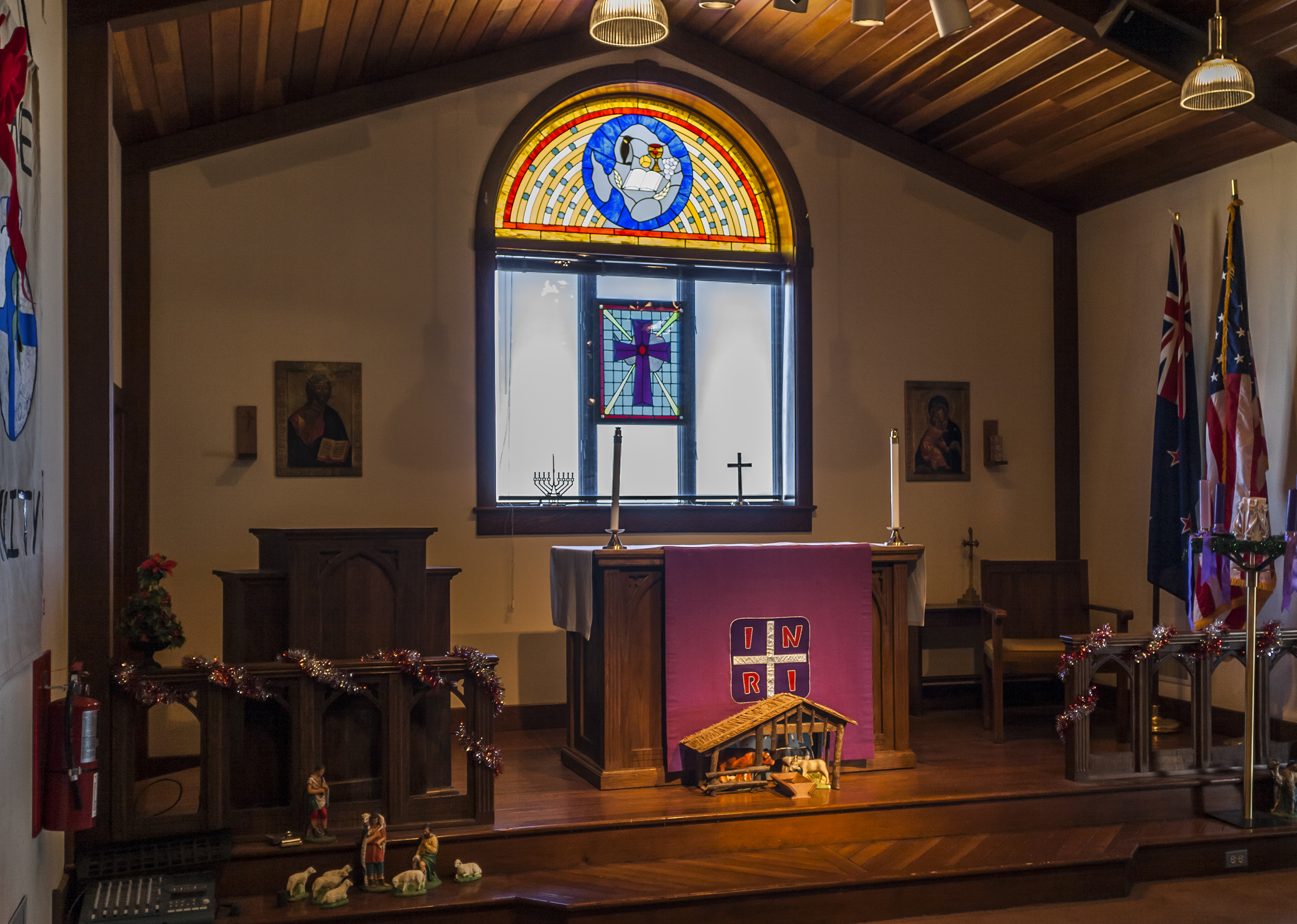
Chapel of the Snows interior

The chapel is the southernmost dedicated religious building in the world and has regular Catholic and Protestant services. From September to March—the austral summer—the chapel is staffed by rotational chaplains. Historically, the Diocese of Christchurch supplied Roman Catholic priests and the U.S. Air National Guard had provided Protestant chaplains. As of 2015, chaplains are entirely military personnel from both the Air National Guard and US Navy, each serving for about four to six weeks on rotation. The chapel is also host to services and meetings for other faith groups such as Latter Day Saints, Baháʼí, and Buddhism and non-religious groups such as Alcoholics Anonymous. These meetings are mostly dependent on lay leadership as the points of contact and facilitators. The building itself holds about 60 worshippers and contains a small meeting room, a Blessed Sacrament chapel, two clergy offices, a small kitchen, and a restroom.

The chapel features custom stained glass which depict the Antarctica Continent, the Erebus Chalice (during austral summers only), and memorabilia from the US Navy's historic involvement in Operation Deep Freeze. The altar of the Chapel of the Snows is believed to come from St Saviour's Chapel in Lyttelton, New Zealand, where Robert Falcon Scott worshiped prior to embarking on the ill-fated Terra Nova Expedition.

== History ==
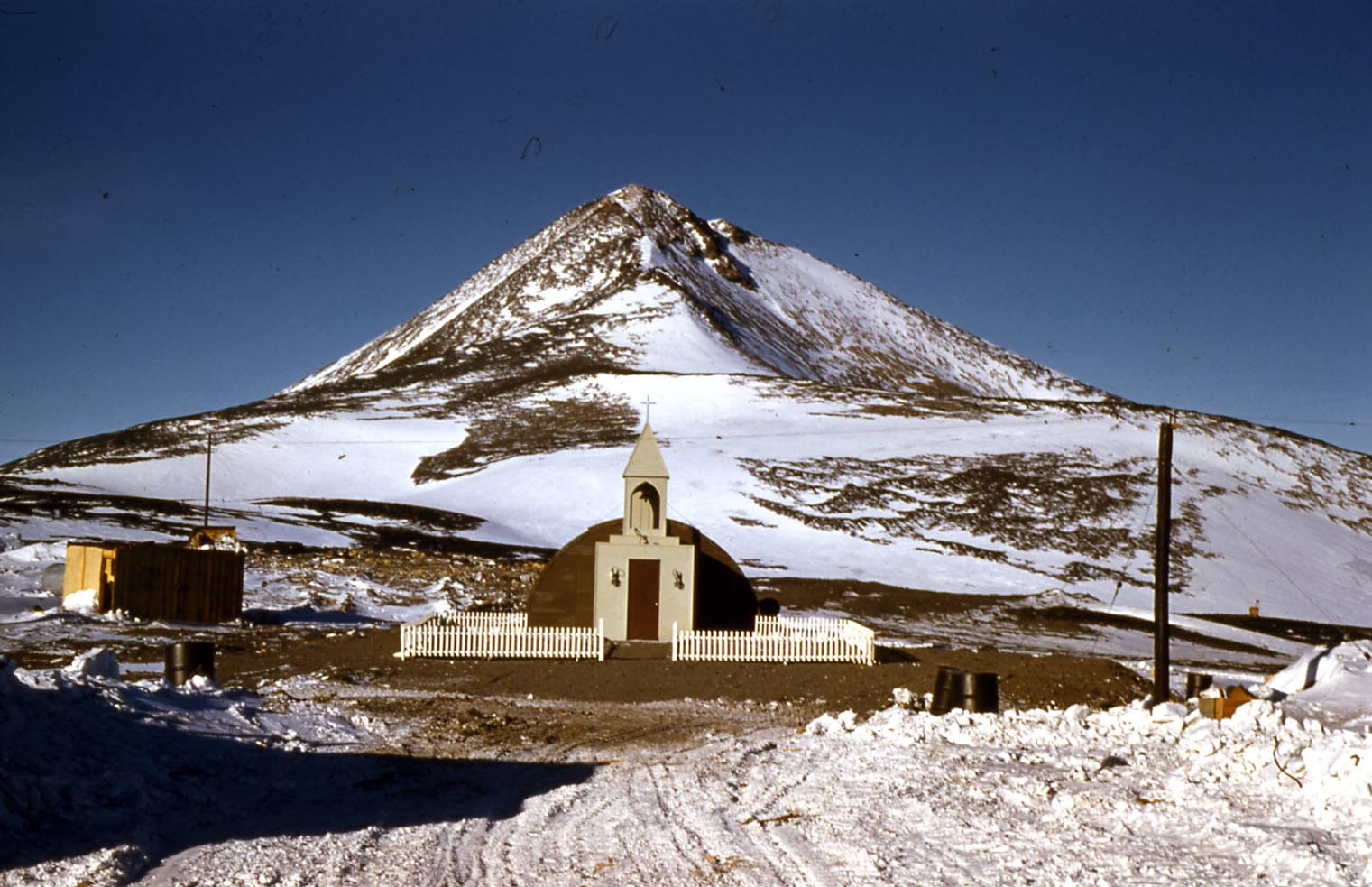
The original Chapel of the Snows

The original Chapel of the Snows was built in 1956 from scrap construction materials by the US Navy Seabees, based out of Port Hueneme, California. The original chapel burned down in 1978 and was replaced with a new temporary chapel. The current chapel was dedicated in 1989. The makeshift building was then converted to other uses and itself burned down in 1991, according to former South Pole field engineer Bill Spindler.

In 2015, the Catholic Priest that had conducted services there stopped visiting at that time, due to a decline in attendance. This marked 57 years of services in Antarctica by the Catholic Church of New Zealand. A military chaplain continues to provide inter-denominational services.

The chapel is one of the buildings that might have been replaced as part of the Antarctic Infrastructure Modernization for Science project, an initiative in the 2010s to upgrade and improve facilities at McMurdo.

== In popular culture ==
- Antarctica: A Year on Ice

== See also ==
- Religion in Antarctica
