= Notre-Dame des Vents =

Chapel in Port-aux-Français, Kerguelen Islands

Coordinates: 49°21′9″S 70°12′55″E

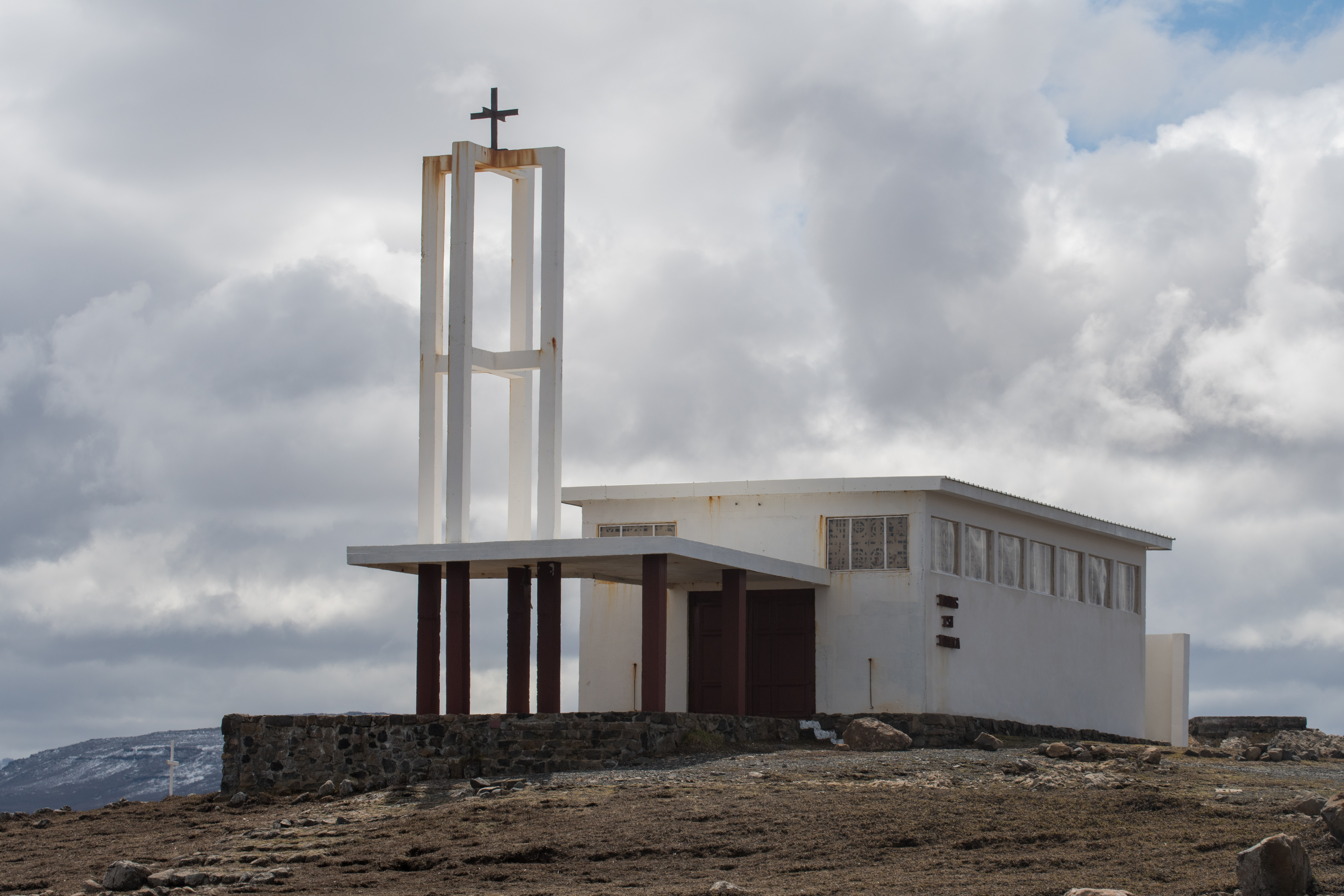
Notre-Dame des Vents

Notre-Dame des Vents (French for 'Our Lady of the Winds') is a Roman Catholic church located in Port-aux-Français, the capital settlement of the Kerguelen Islands, Territory of the French Southern and Antarctic Lands in the south Indian Ocean.

The chapel was built during the 1950s and is made out of concrete. Small rectangular stained glass adorn the base of the ceiling. Its proportions are based on the Golden Ratio. A few celebrations are held through the year.

A statue of the Virgin and Child is located between the chapel and the Golfe du Morbihan (Kerguelen). It is the southernmost French Catholic place of worship.
