= Bertrab Nunatak =

Nunatak in Coats Land, Antarctica

Coordinates: 77°55′S 34°32′W

Bertrab Nunatak is a nunatak on the southern side of Lerchenfeld Glacier and about 10 kilometres (6.2 mi) west-south-west of the Littlewood Nunataks. It has been described as "a bare rock about 1,739 feet high [that] forms the southern entrance point of the [Duke Ernst] Bay."

It was discovered by the Second German Antarctic Expedition, 1911–12, under Wilhelm Filchner, who named this feature for General Hermann Karl von Bertrab.
