= Marambio (disambiguation) =

Marambio Base is a base and scientific research station in Argentine Antarctica.

Marambio may also refer to:

- Gustavo Argentino Marambio, Argentine aviator
- Seymour Island, sometimes called Marambio Island, Graham Land, Antarctic Peninsula
- Marambio Airport, that serves Marambio Base
