= Agrupación Aérea Presidencial =

The Agrupación Aérea Presidencial (Presidential Air Group) was the Head of State Air Transport Unit for the President of Argentina. It was closed in 2016 by president Mauricio Macri, because of the high cost of repairs and maintenance and the lack of adequate pilots.

== History ==
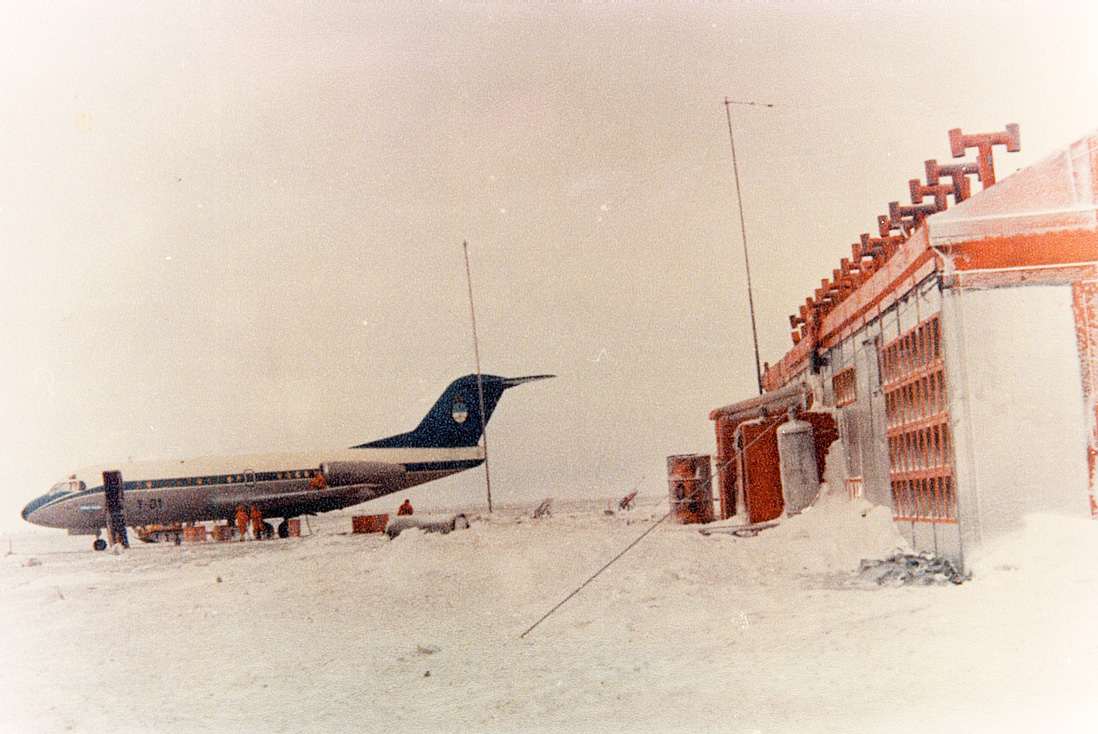
Fokker F28 T-01 at Marambio Base, Antarctica, 1973.

The Presidential Air Group was a small fleet of Argentine Air Force aircraft and helicopters for official use by the President, immediate family, and senior government officials. The fleet was administered by the Casa Militar ("Military House"), charged with presidential security and transportation. Both military and civilian pilots staffed the fleet. The aircraft were painted white with pale blue lines, evoking the Argentine Flag.

Some notable presidential aviation events:

- July 28, 1973: Fokker F-28 Patagonia landed on Antarctic Marambio Base
- August 26, 1985: Former President Raúl Alfonsín was launched from the Argentine Navy aircraft carrier ARA 25 de Mayo on a Grumman S-2 Tracker number 0702/2-AS-23.

After assuming office in 2015, president Mauricio Macri requested an assessment of the unit to determine the fleet status and decide if it was economically viable.

== Fleet ==
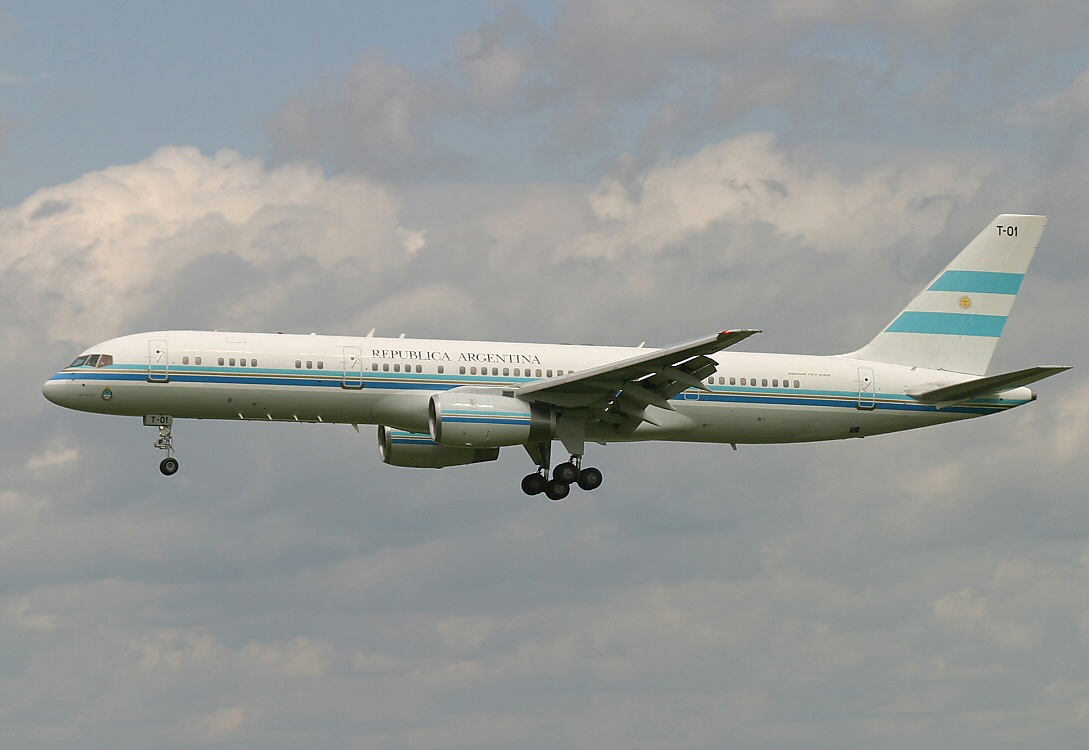
Boeing 757 Tango 01.

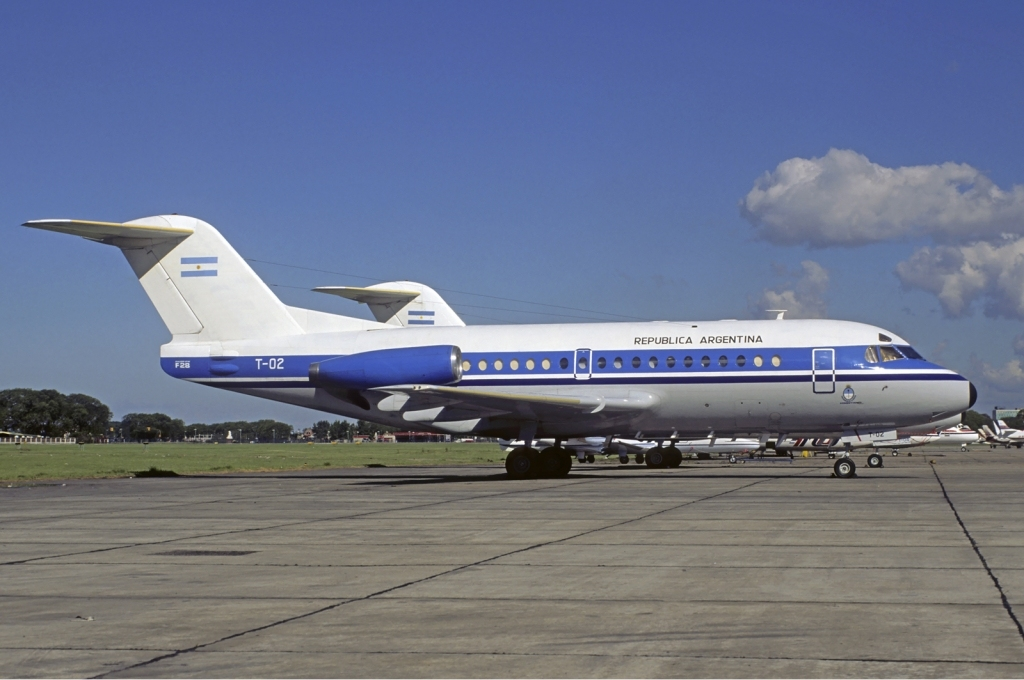
Fokker F28 Tango 02.

As of February 2016, the Argentine presidential fleet was composed of 5 aircraft (one leased) and 3 helicopters.

The main aircraft was a Boeing 757 known as Tango 01 after its military registry: "T-01" (the "T" stands for "Transport", although it is fortuitously pronounced "Tango", as in the Argentine national dance, in the NATO alphabet). The 757 entered in service in 1995 replacing the former T-01, a Boeing 707. Nicknamed Virgen de Luján after Argentina's patron saint, the 757 has been object of political contention for the last decade (and a political campaign hot-topic during the 1999 Presidential election), with many politicians and media commentators denouncing this aircraft as an unnecessary and expensive luxury prone to abuse by presidents, their families, friends and political allies.

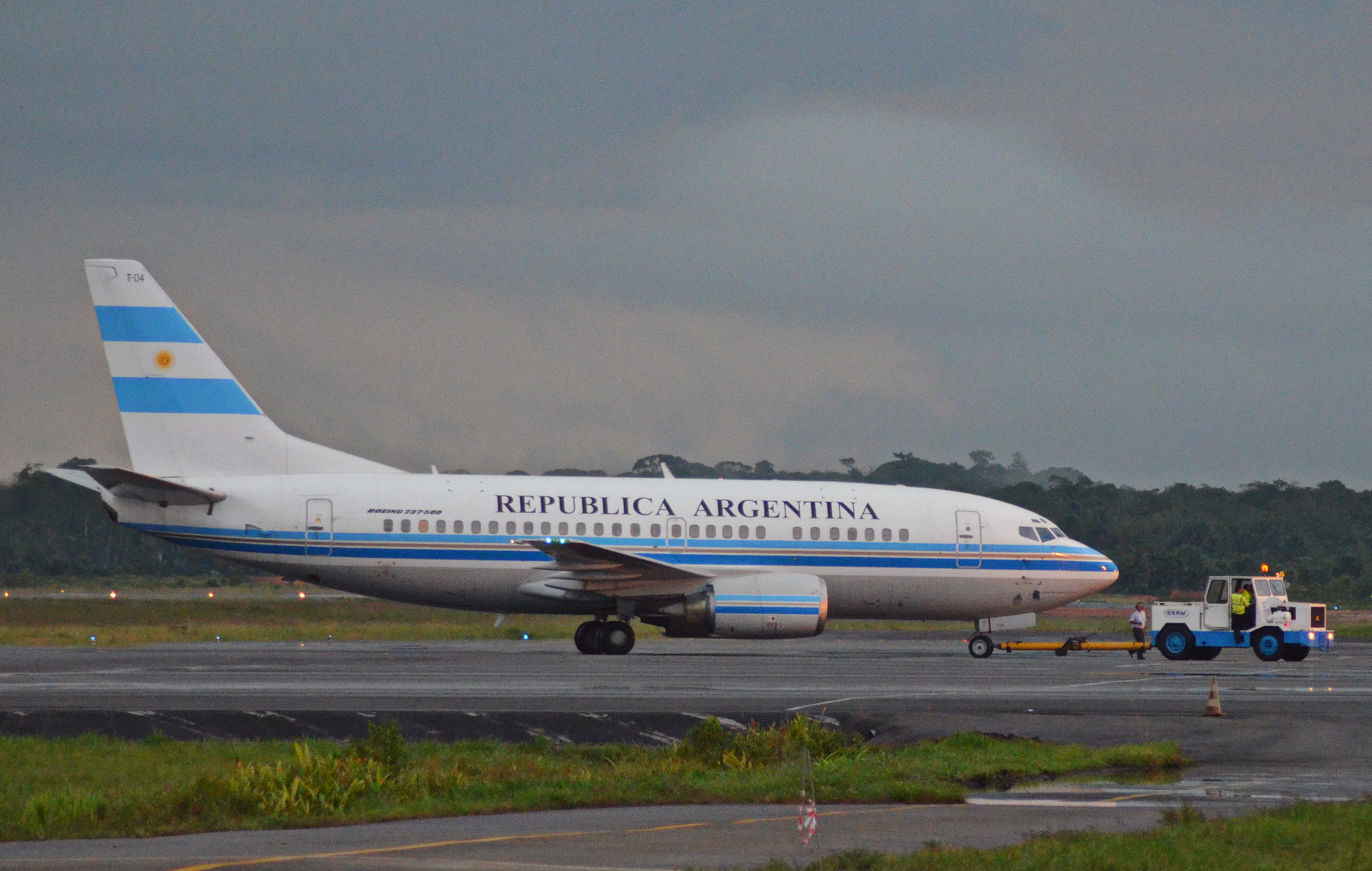
Boeing 737 T-04

The current Presidential fleet also includes two Fokker F28 (T-02 and T-03) (one always in service), a Boeing 737-500 (T-04) and a Learjet 60 (T-10). The Learjet is also used by the Air Force Chief of Staff.

These aircraft are based at Aeroparque Jorge Newbery and El Palomar Air Force base.

As helicopters, a Sikorsky S-70 (H-01^{pic}) and two Sikorsky S-76 (H-02 Virgen de Loreto^{pic} and H-03^{pic}) also make-up the fleet, with an additional Air Force Bell 212, as needed.

During Néstor Kirchner and Cristina Fernández administration, AAP used different aircraft for their global flights, most notably Boeing 747 loaned from Aerolíneas Argentinas and a private Bombardier Global 5000.

=== Former fleet ===
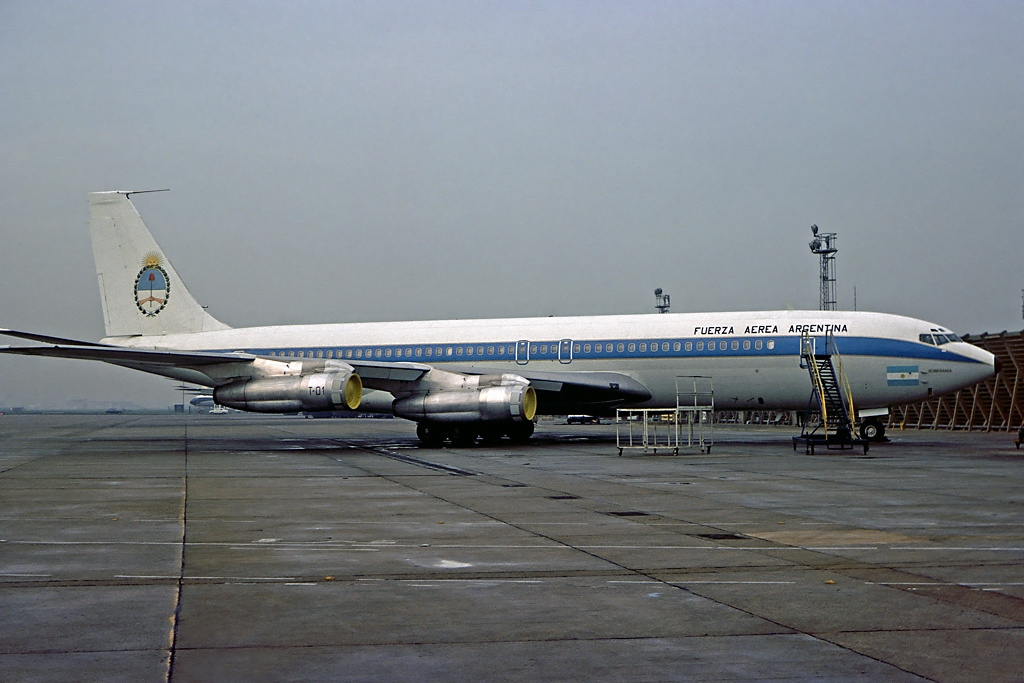
Boeing 707 Tango 01 at Heathrow, UK, December 1976

Aircraft

- Vickers VC.1 Viking T-64 (ex LV-XFM) 1948-1952
- Rockwell Aero Commander 680 1957-1967
- Douglas DC-3 Independencia T-01 (ex LV-XFY) 1959-1966
- Avro 748 Libertad
- FMA IA 50 Guaraní II
- Fokker F-28 T-02 Patagonia 1977-1999
- Boeing 707-320C T-01 (TC-91 from 1977)

Helicopters

- Sikorsky S-51 and Sikorsky S-55, although not officially part of the AAP, were used by the President while in service for the Air Force
- Sikorsky S-58T H-01 1974-1979 and H-02 1975-1980
- Sikorsky S-61R H-02 1993-1997

== Incidents ==
- September 19, 1993: with former President Carlos Menem on board, an Air Force CH-47 Chinook went down while visiting Pozo de Mortero near Las Lomitas in Formosa Province without any casualties.
- April 1, 1998: again President Menem had a critical moment, this time aboard T-01 when it performed an aborted hard landing due to strong crosswinds at Wellington during a state visit to New Zealand. The pilot regained control of the aircraft and divert to Auckland where they landed an hour later. Prime Minister Jenny Shipley had to be moved to meet President Menem there.
- August 1, 2003: President Néstor Kirchner had an emergency landing in "Quebrada de Humahuaca" near "Posta de Hornillos" (Jujuy province), while being on board the Salta province Bell 407 helicopter.
- October 19, 2004: Tango 01 made a successful emergency landing at the military airbase of El Palomar soon after taking off at Aeroparque Jorge Newbery in Buenos Aires when one of its engines caught fire. The engines were taken to Israel for a complete overhaul and the aircraft return to service mid-2005. In the meantime, two chartered Boeing 747s operated by Aerolíneas Argentinas served the Presidential transport role when traveling abroad, and when the 757 was back into service, President Néstor Kirchner continued using the 747s for long travel, due to its extended range.
- April 19, 2009: Tango 01 with President Cristina Kirchner on board was returning from the 5th Summit of the Americas en route from Trinidad and Tobago to Buenos Aires, made an emergency landing at Simón Bolívar International Airport, in Venezuela, after the cockpit windscreen cracked during flight due "to the differences of temperatures inside and outside of the aircraft". Venezuelan President Hugo Chávez lent the Argentine delegation a Falcon jet for the remainder of the trip.

== Gallery ==
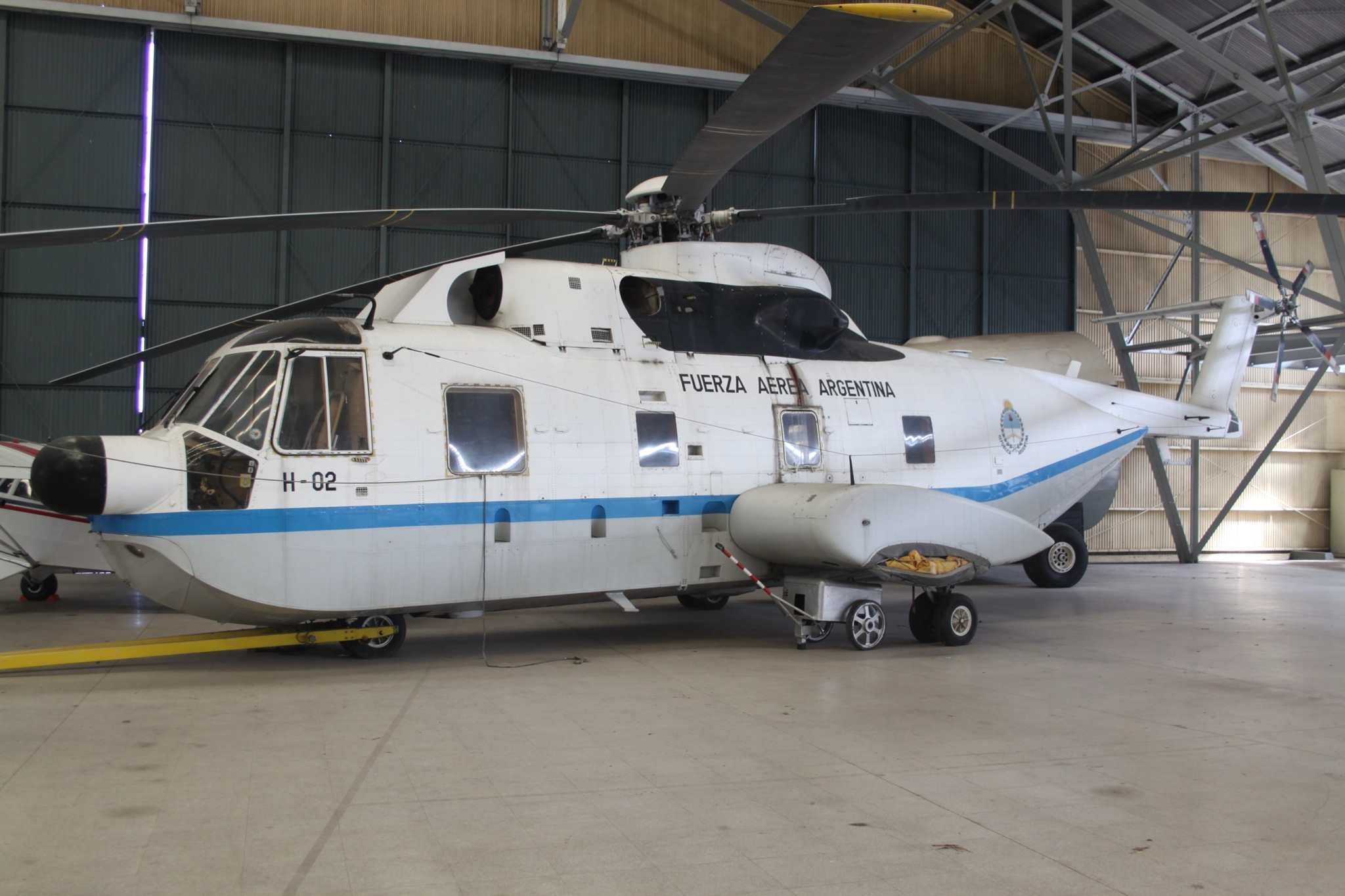
Sikorsky S-61 H-02

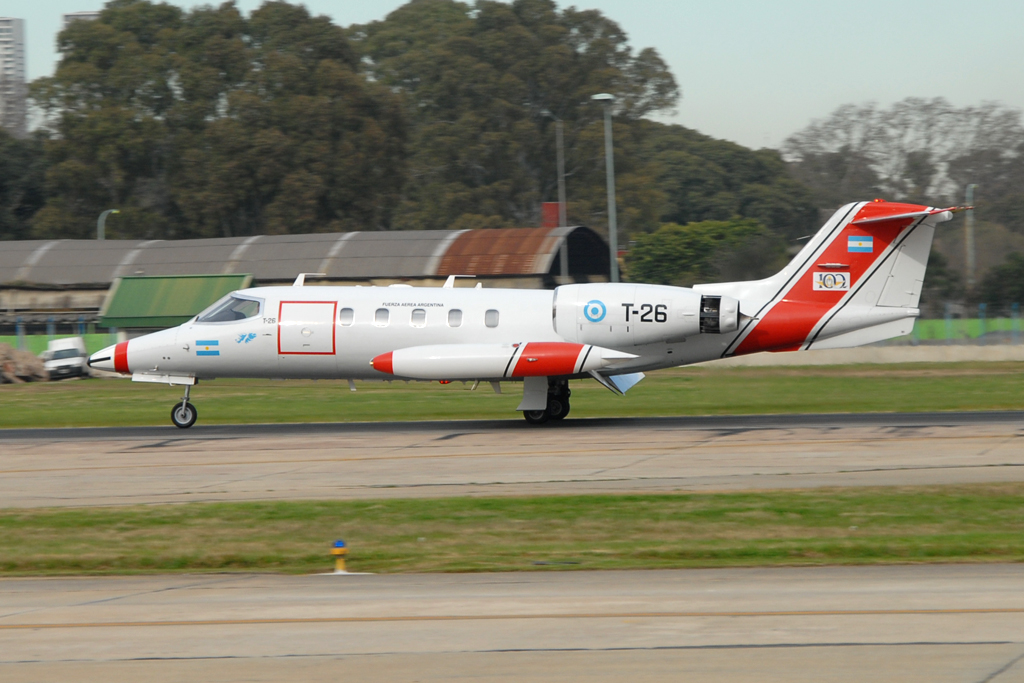

== See also ==
- Air transports of heads of state and government
