= Chapadmalal presidential compound =

Official retreat of the president of Argentina

Coordinates: 38°12′28″S 57°41′39″W

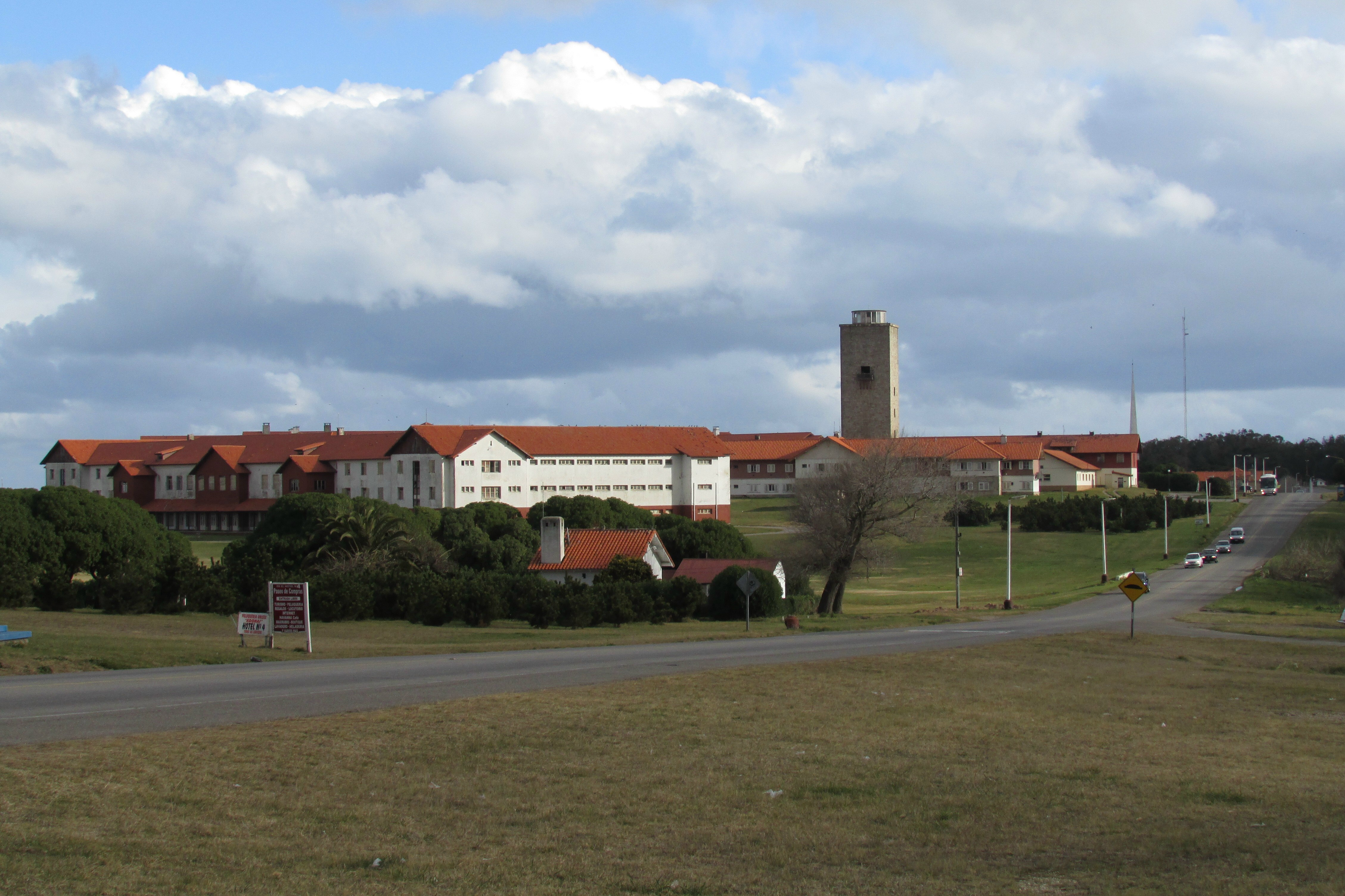
Chapadmalal complex

Chapadmalal compound is an official retreat of the president of Argentina located at the locality of the same name. It is located on the southern coast of Mar del Plata, in the Buenos Aires Province, and serves as a summer residence. It has a hotel complex nearby.

The compound was built in 1947, during the presidency of Juan Perón. Raúl Alfonsín only used it on limited occasions. Carlos Menem ordered several improvements, such as a fishing wharf, a higher pool and a shrine. Fernando de la Rúa used it for interviews. During the 2001 Argentine crisis, Adolfo Rodríguez Saá called a summit of governors to it, which was attended by only five; this lack of support led to his resignation. Néstor and Cristina Kirchner did not use it, only their sons visited it on occasions. Mauricio Macri used it for a meeting of his cabinet in a less formal environment.
