= Marambio Airport =

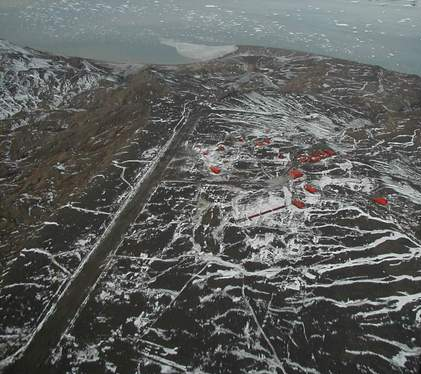
- Marambio's runway looking northeast
- IATA: none; ICAO: SAWB

Summary
- Airport type: Public/Military
- Operator: Government of Argentina
- Serves: Marambio Base
- Location: Seymour Island
- Elevation AMSL: 760 ft / 232 m
- Coordinates: 64°14′22″S 56°37′50″W

Map
- Location of the airport in Antarctica

Runways
Direction	Length		Surface
Direction	m	ft	Surface
05/23 01/19	1,260x35 1,600x40	4,118x115 5,249x131	Graded earth Graded earth
- Source: GCM SkyVector

Marambio Airport (ICAO: SAWB) is an airport serving Marambio Base, an Argentinian research station on Seymour Island in the Antarctic Peninsula. Marambio is the main air-support node for most local and foreign stations in Argentine Antarctica, providing year-round medical evacuation, search and rescue, personnel, cargo, and mail transfer.

Supplies are taken to the Marambio Base during the whole year for later distribution to other Argentine bases (except for Belgrano II). There are over 100 intercontinental flights every year.

== Facilities ==
The airport control tower is 12 m (39 ft) high. The runway is lined with strobe lights. The parking apron provides large cargo aircraft like the Hercules C-130 with access to fuel and concurrent services.

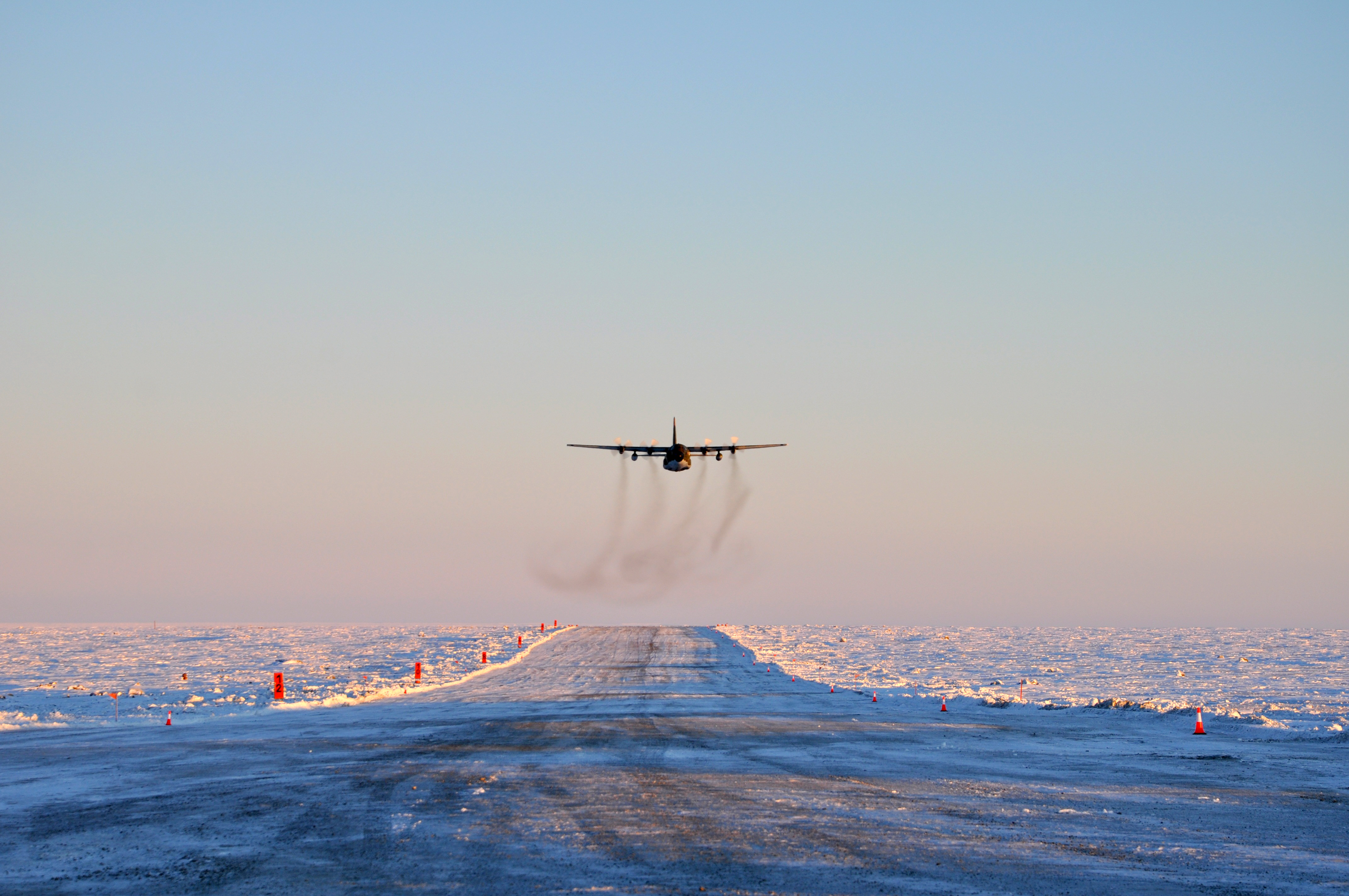
A C-130 Hercules over the airstrip

There is a hangar for the Argentine Air Force de Havilland Canada DHC-6 Twin Otter that routinely operates from the base along with two Bell 212s that are deployed during the summer campaigns to support scientific activities and link to other Argentine bases.

== See also ==
- Transport in Antarctica
- List of airports in Antarctica
