= Marambio Base =

Marambio Station Estación Marambio
- Antarctic Station
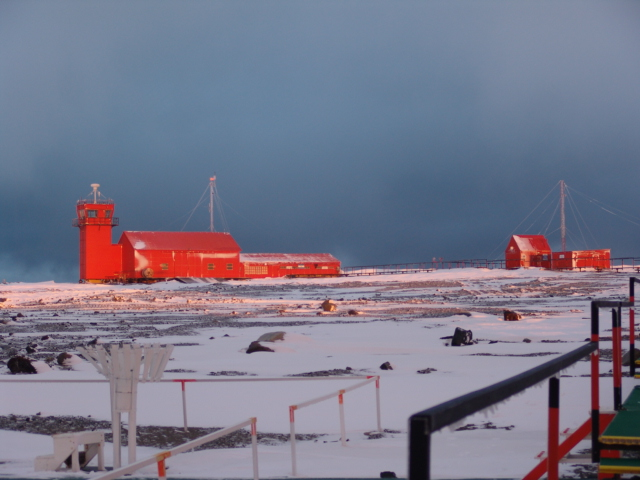
- Airfield control tower at Marambio
- Nickname: Spanish: Puerta de Entrada a la Antártida ("Antarctica's Entrance Door")
- Location within Antarctica
- Coordinates: 64°14′28″S 56°37′36″W
- Country: Argentina
- Province: Tierra del Fuego, Antarctica, and South Atlantic Islands Province
- Department: Antártida Argentina
- Region: Graham Land; Antarctic Peninsula; Antarctica
- Location: Marambio Island
- Founded: 29 October 1969 (1969–70 austral summer season)
- Named for: Gustavo Argentino Marambio

Government
  - Type: Directorate
  - Body: Dirección Nacional del Antártico
  - Operator: Instituto Antártico Argentino

Area
  - Indoors: 2 ha (4.9 acres)
- Elevation: 210 m (690 ft)

Population (2017)
  - Summer: 165
  - Winter: 70
- Time zone: UTC-3 (ART)
- UN/LOCODE: AQ MRB
- Type: All year-round
- Period: Annual
- Status: Active and operational
- Activities: List: Paleontology; Stratigraphy; Sedimentology; Cryology; Geodosy
- Facilities: List: Main hall; Dining hall; Recreation hall; Emergency house; Personnel houses; Airport; Airline passenger terminal; Aircraft parking platform; Flight deck; Flight ground support; Library; Mail office; Gym; Chapel; Hospital; Laundry; Kitchen; Snow melter; Radio and satellite station; Main and auxiliary power plants; Towing vehicles fleet; Personnel and cargo vehicles fleet; Road keeping machines fleet; Vehicle garage; Workshop (mechanical, carpentry, plumbing, blacksmithing, electricity, turning); Laboratory (meteorology, riometry, paleontology, geology, glaciology, geodesy); Freezing chamber (2); Fuel storage array; Warehouses and deposits; Potable water and sewerage network; Waste treatment plant; Firefighting system; CATV; Mobile telephone coverage
- Website: marambio.aq

Marambio Station (Spanish: Estación Marambio) is a permanent, all year-round Argentine Antarctica station named after Vice-Commodore Gustavo Argentino Marambio, an Antarctic aviation pioneer. It is administrated by the Comando Conjunto Antártico and It is located in Marambio Island, Graham Land, Antarctic Peninsula, some 100 km (60 mi) from the coastal civilian village of Esperanza.

At the time of its construction it was the first airfield in Antarctica and is still one of the most frequently used ones due to its suitability for wheeled landing, for which it is called "Antarctica's Entrance Door" (Spanish: Puerta de Entrada a la Antártida). It is also Argentina's most important station in the continent.

As of 2014, Marambio is one of 13 research stations in Antarctica operated by Argentina.

== History ==
The increased Antarctic activity that Argentina developed since 1940 created the need for an aviation runway operable throughout the year for wheeled units. The flight of Vice-Commodore Mario Luis Olezza to the South Pole, the newly built United States McMurdo Station and the frequent operations launched from the Matienzo Station showed the need to secure better transport and communications in the sector.

The Argentine Air Force set about to find a suitable spot to construct an airport. On 25 November 1968, two helicopters operating from the icebreaker ARA General San Martín descended on the Marambio Island as part of such survey. Their report favoring the place was decisive: it lacked large obstacles that could trouble aircraft maneuvering, and its long plateau was virtually free of ice.

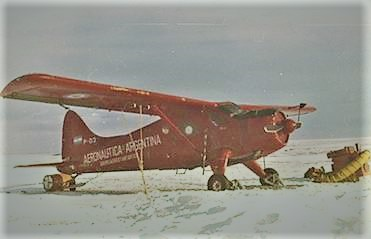
Argentine Air Force DHC-2 Beaver in Antarctica

On 30 August 1969, an Air Force team led by Vice-Commodore Olezza occupied the island, carrying with them the elements needed for the construction of the projected landing track. When initially opened, the 05/23-oriented runway had a length of 300 m (980 ft). It was the first one in the continent. The task took three months of work and culminated when a de Havilland Canada DHC-2 Beaver, set with conventional wheels, took off from Matienzo Station and landed on the new airport. Before the end of October the runway had already reached 800 m (2,600 ft).

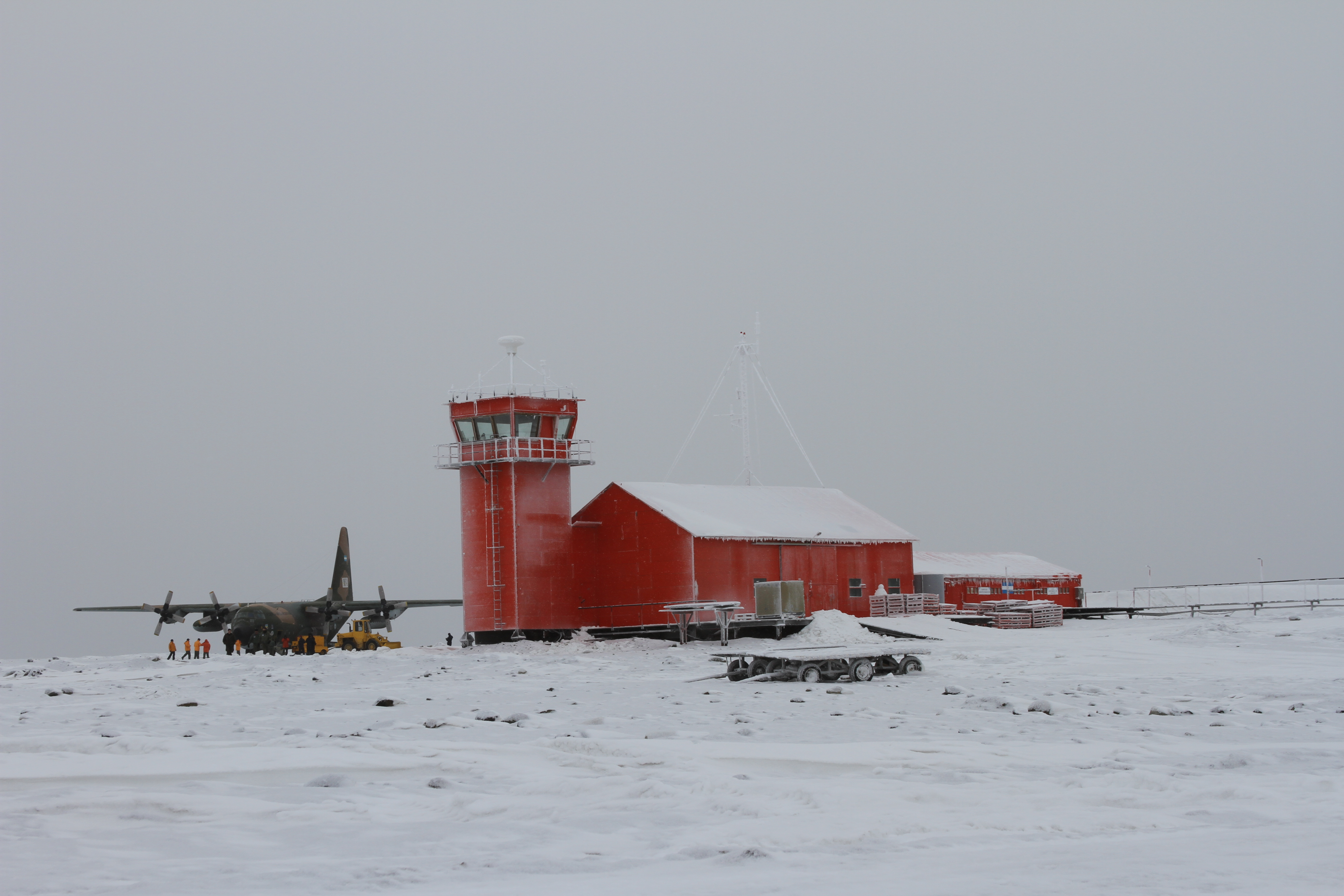
Argentine C-130 and control tower, Marambio Airport

The station was founded on 29 October 1969. That day, a Fokker F-27 Friendship of the Argentine Air Force manned by Vice-Commodore Erwin Roberto Kern, left Rio Gallegos and landed directly in Marambio Airport, carrying on board civil and military authorities. It was the first aircraft taking off in another continent and landing in Antarctica using conventional landing gear: Antarctica was no longer an isolated place; from that day onwards, all domestic and foreign Antarctic stations got interconnected with the rest of the world throughout the year. It was the most important Antarctic event in the decade.

By April 1970, the runway had reached 1,200 by 40 m (3,940 by 130 ft). On 11 April 1970, the Argentine Air Force began landing their C-130 Hercules on Antarctica when the TC-61 commanded by Commodore Arturo Athos Gandolfi landed in Marambio, starting a long-standing and uninterrupted tradition of air-supplying the Antarctic Argentine stations from the mainland. The Fokker F28 Fellowship presidential aircraft T-01 Patagonia was the first jet to land in Antarctica when it touched down at Marambio on 28 July 1973, 13:28 h.

Commercial passenger traffic from Ushuaia has been announced for 2018.

== Description ==
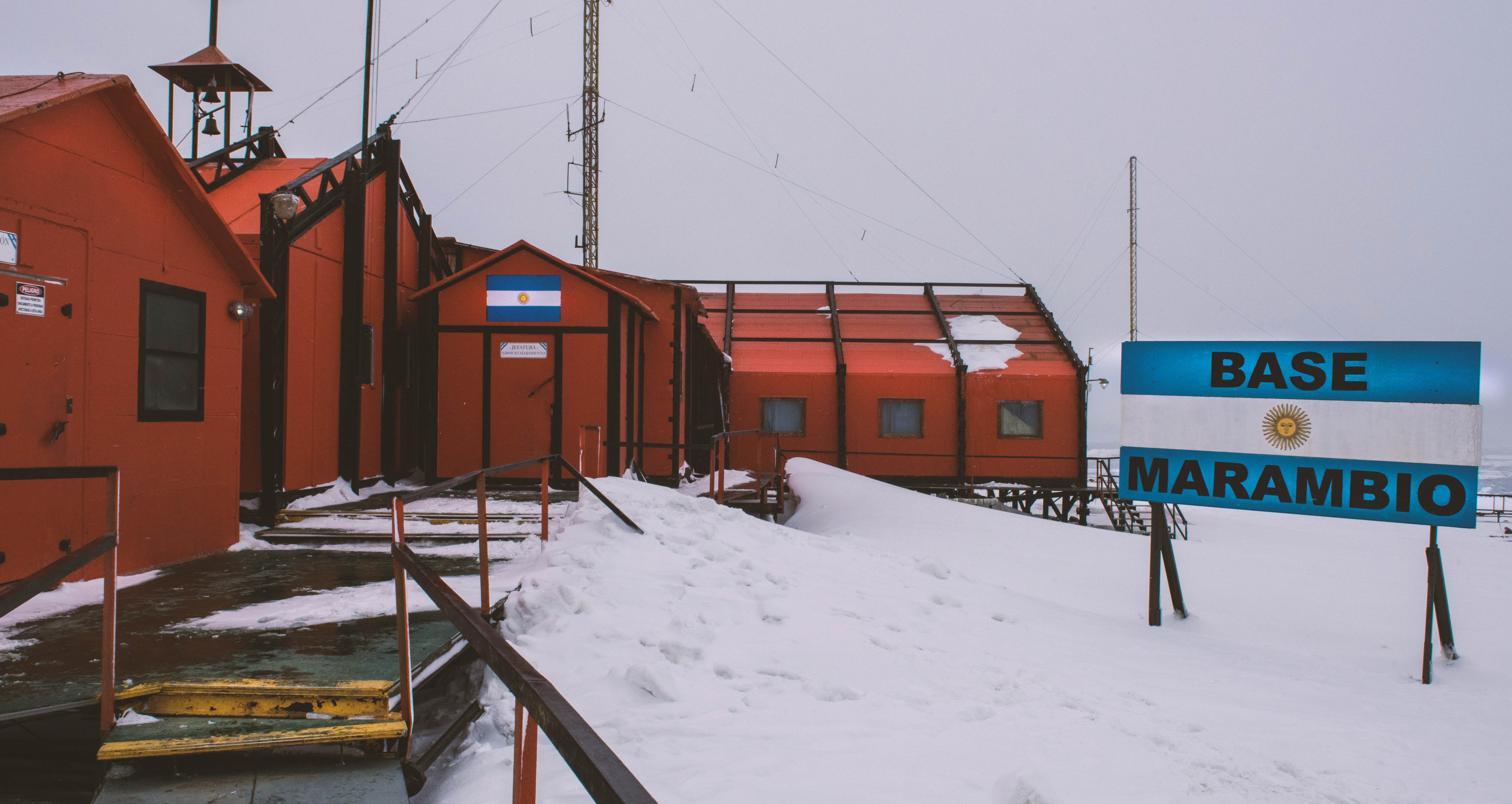
Main building

As of 2014, Marambio has 27 buildings with a total covered area exceeding 20,000 m^{2} (220,000 sq ft; 2.0 ha). It can host a permanent staff of 60 people and a large complement of scientific personnel, reaching 165 people.

Some of the facilities are: main, dining and recreation halls; emergency house with 28-bed capacity; personnel accommodation buildings; aircraft parking platform; flight deck; airline passenger terminal; flight ground support equipment; library; mail office; gym; a Catholic chapel; laundry; kitchen; two freezing chambers; snow melter; satellite dish for television and internet; radio communications station; towing and personnel carrier vehicles (including tractors, trucks and forklifts); road maintenance tools and vehicles (several snow dozers, tracked loaders and graders); mechanical, carpentry, blacksmithing, turning, plumbing and electricity workshops; laboratory with substations for APT (Automatic Picture Transmission) satellite imagery receiver, ozone and uv light measurement, sounding balloon and radiosonde setup and launching, a MBI International Meteorological Center, and others; several warehouses and deposits; fuel storage array; potable water and sewerage network; incinerator and waste disposal module, and firefighting system.

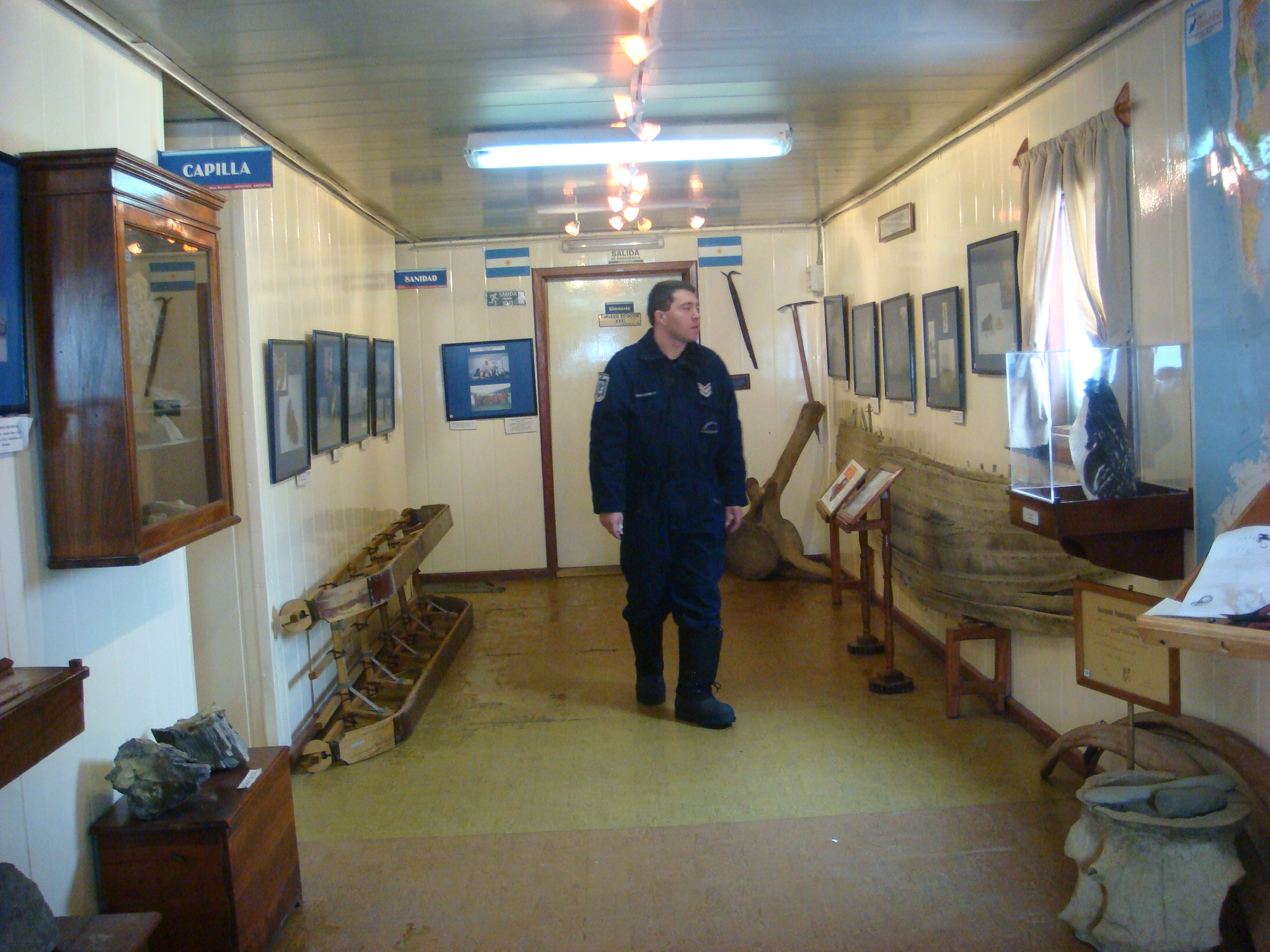
"Patrulla Soberanía" museum, Marambio Station

The station also has CATV and public and internal mobile phone service. The 45 m^{2} (480 sq ft) medical suite is attended by one doctor and three paramedics, and has three beds and x-ray, dentistry, coronary care and telemedicine facilities. Over 492,000 L (108,000 imp gal; 130,000 US gal) of Antarctic gasoil are used every year for transportation, and to feed the 1,000 kW main power plant with its three Caterpillar generators. The station also has a sewage treatment plant. Most buildings are connected together by risen metal footpaths to isolate them from snow and ice.

In 2010, the Argentine company CITEDEF designed and installed a wind generator on the station.

=== Airport ===
The station is supported by Marambio Airport.

=== Communications ===
The station is connected to the Argentine mainland and the world through a satellite downlink station with telephone, fax, TV and internet. They also have a DirecTV dish which provides their service to the whole station. Argentine mobile telephone company Claro and Spanish Movistar have an antenna for local coverage. Within the station and between stations, radio is the most used mean of communication, mainly through HF, Vox/Data, aeronautic VHF-AM and UHF-FM.

Internet access is provided by Speedy Argentina, allowing the personnel in the station to be permanently connected to net services. Wireless LAN and Wi-Fi cover the entire complex, becoming one of the southernmost spots in the world with a wireless network. Telephone service is provided by Telefónica de Argentina at low national rates.

In September 2006, a GSM mobile phone network was also added to the station, provided by the Argentine mobile operator CTI Móvil (now Claro).

=== Scientific activities ===
Scientific research at Marambio is planned and executed by specialized departments, usually during the summer campaigns:

- Earth Sciences carries out paleontology, stratigraphy, sedimentology, petrography, cryology, glaciology and geodesy.
- Atmospheric Sciences research include cosmic ray and ionospheric observations, and stratospheric ozone monitoring. The LAMBI Ozone Laboratory, managed by the Atmospheric Sciences station, started in 1994 to obtain ozone records by absorption. It is a joint program with the INTA (Spanish National Institute for Aerospace Technology)
- Geophysics analyzes the composition, structure and mobility of the Antarctic lithosphere by seismic, magnetic, magnetotelluric and gravimetric surveys. It researches on tectonic dynamics in order to define its configuration from the Cretaceous to the present. It also conducts paleoclimatic and paleoenvironmental studies to determine relevant trends during the late Cenozoic.
- Dynamics and Chemistry of Ice investigates changes during the last decade in selected glaciers on the Ross and Vega islands. It also examines significant changes in the Larsen Ice Shelf and provides essential information on the distribution of Antarctic icebergs along the tracks of vessels operating in the Antarctic.
- Human Impact researches environmental processes in relation to possible disturbances caused by human activities over the terrestrial ecosystem dynamics in the area of Marambio. The program develops guidelines for environmental management and monitoring.

In addition Marambio is home to various ongoing scientific projects:

- The Museoantar historical archaeology program undergoes recovery, preservation and restoration of the refuges built by the 1901–04 Swedish Antarctic Expedition on Snow Hill Island.
- In 2011, during the "Mars in Marambio" mission, NASA scientists arrived at the station to test a new space suit designed for future exploration of Mars.
- In 2013, the Finnish Meteorological Institute in co-operation with the Servicio Meteorológico Nacional and with the Argentine Air Force started a new continuous atmospheric measurement program in Marambio. Observations cover greenhouse gases (mostly CH_{4} and CO_{2}) while investigating the physical, chemical and optical properties of aerosol particles and incoming and outgoing UV radiation. This scientific project made Marambio the most comprehensive atmospheric measurement station in the Antarctic continent.
- The station has been chosen for the location of balloon launches of the French project Estrateole to study the ozone layer.
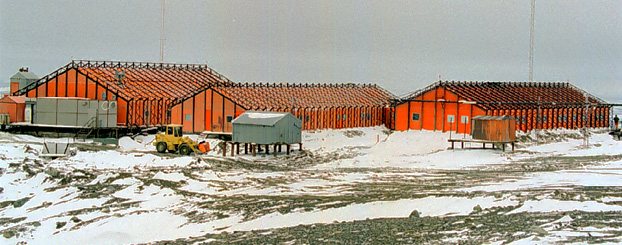
Marambio under daily routine duties, date unknown

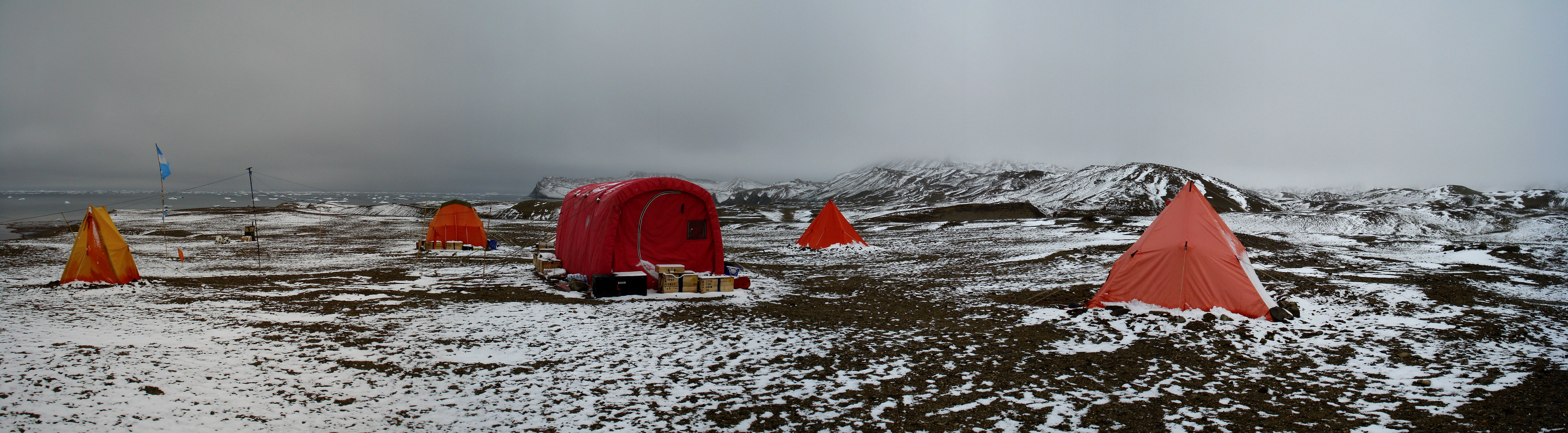
Scientific camp, 2009 austral autumn

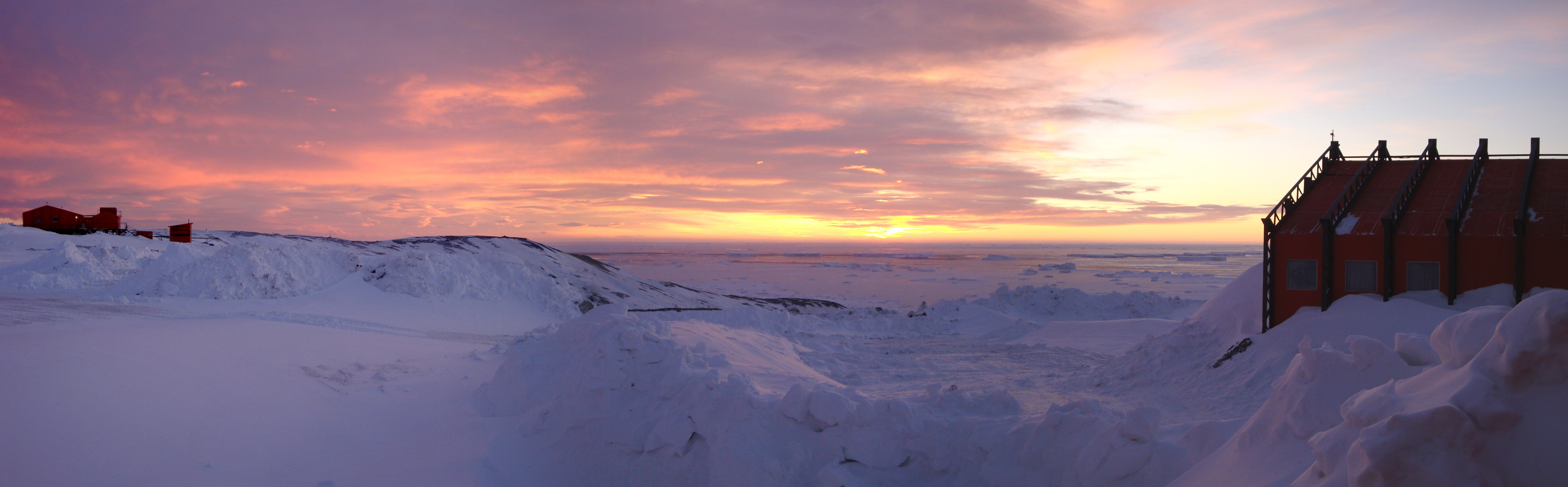
Panoramic photo of Marambio Station at dawn, 2009 austral autumn

== Climate ==
In spite of its relatively low latitude, Marambio Station is situated in an ice cap climate, albeit much less severe than in Antarctica's interior.

Nonetheless, the climate is severe with mean temperatures that rarely rise above 0 °C (32 °F) and the presence of strong winds. The strong winds produce a wind chill that makes the temperatures feel colder. In particular, gusts up to 220 km/h (140 mph) can occur during the winter months. Due to the partial melting of snow in summer due to above freezing daytime temperatures, animals as well as limited plant life (moss, lichens, and worts) are able to thrive during the warmer months of December, January, and February.

Mean monthly temperatures range from −15.1 °C (4.8 °F) in June to −1.7 °C (28.9 °F) in December. During summer, the average high is above freezing while the average low is −4.2 °C (24.4 °F). However, temperatures can reach up to 15 °C (59.0 °F) or fall below −15 °C (5.0 °F) during summer. In winter, the average high is −11 °C (12 °F) while the average low is −19 °C (−2 °F). Occasionally, temperatures can reach above freezing during winter. This occurs when warm air from the northeast (characterized by high cloud cover and fog) or from the northwest moves towards the peninsula. As the warm air crosses the mountains in the peninsula, it warms as it descends, leading to warm and dry conditions in a manner similar to a Zonda wind. Its highest recorded temperature was 17.4 °C (63.3 °F) on 23 March 2015. This was surpassed on 9 February 2020 when a temperature of 20.75 °C (69.3 °F) was recorded at the station.

Fog frequently occurs in the station. December and January are the foggiest months, averaging 16 to 19 days with fog while June to September are the least, averaging 9 to 11 days. The station is characterized by high cloud cover throughout the year in the form of stratus clouds. Summer is the cloudiest season, averaging 24 cloudy days while winters are the least cloudiest, averaging 10 to 11 cloudy days.

Climate data for Marambio (1991–2020, extremes 1971–present)
Month	Jan	Feb	Mar	Apr	May	Jun	Jul	Aug	Sep	Oct	Nov	Dec	Year
Record high °C (°F)	15.2 (59.4)	15.8 (60.4)	17.4 (63.3)	12.3 (54.1)	15.4 (59.7)	11.8 (53.2)	10.8 (51.4)	8.5 (47.3)	9.8 (49.6)	14.1 (57.4)	13.8 (56.8)	16.5 (61.7)	17.4 (63.3)
Mean daily maximum °C (°F)	1.7 (35.1)	1.0 (33.8)	−2.1 (28.2)	−6.1 (21.0)	−7.4 (18.7)	−10.7 (12.7)	−10.3 (13.5)	−9.3 (15.3)	−6.1 (21.0)	−3.6 (25.5)	−0.4 (31.3)	1.3 (34.3)	−4.3 (24.3)
Daily mean °C (°F)	−0.8 (30.6)	−1.8 (28.8)	−5.5 (22.1)	−10.0 (14.0)	−11.9 (10.6)	−14.9 (5.2)	−14.9 (5.2)	−13.8 (7.2)	−10.6 (12.9)	−7.3 (18.9)	−3.4 (25.9)	−1.3 (29.7)	−8.0 (17.6)
Mean daily minimum °C (°F)	−3.0 (26.6)	−4.2 (24.4)	−8.6 (16.5)	−13.7 (7.3)	−16.1 (3.0)	−18.7 (−1.7)	−19.3 (−2.7)	−18.1 (−0.6)	−14.8 (5.4)	−11.0 (12.2)	−6.2 (20.8)	−3.7 (25.3)	−11.4 (11.5)
Record low °C (°F)	−9.5 (14.9)	−15.6 (3.9)	−24.6 (−12.3)	−31.5 (−24.7)	−34.5 (−30.1)	−37.6 (−35.7)	−36.8 (−34.2)	−38.3 (−36.9)	−34.0 (−29.2)	−26.8 (−16.2)	−21.3 (−6.3)	−11.2 (11.8)	−38.3 (−36.9)
Average precipitation mm (inches)	44.4 (1.75)	55.1 (2.17)	51.5 (2.03)	26.1 (1.03)	24.6 (0.97)	13.9 (0.55)	17.8 (0.70)	17.6 (0.69)	30.7 (1.21)	18.1 (0.71)	28.0 (1.10)	35.0 (1.38)	362.8 (14.29)
Average snowy days	16.2	12.8	13.9	12.2	9.5	9.5	8.5	9.5	8.9	11.9	13.0	15.3	141.2
Average ultraviolet index	5	3	1	1	0	0	0	1	2	4	5	5	2
Source 1: Servicio Meteorológico Nacional (UV 1998-2019) (precipitation 2001–2010)
Source 2: Meteo Climat (record highs and lows)(June maximum temperature record)

== See also ==
- List of Antarctic research stations
- List of Antarctic field camps
- List of airports in Antarctica
