= A Relation of a Voyage =

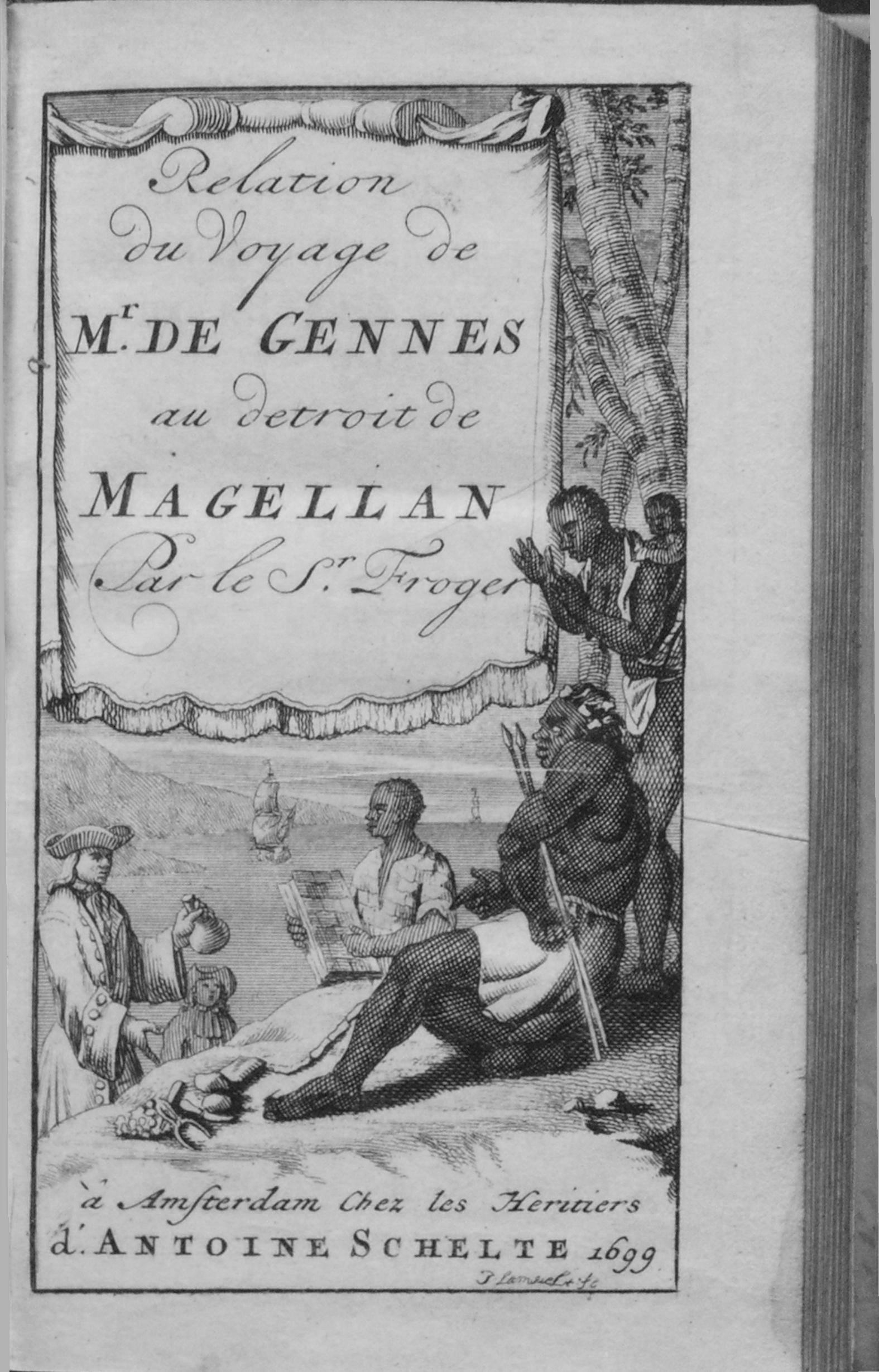
Page de titre "Relation d'un voyage fait en 1695, 1696 et 1697."

A Relation of a Voyage made in the Years 1695, 1696, 1697 on the Coasts of Africa, Streights of Magellan, Brasil, Cayenna, and the Antilles, by a Squadron of French Men of War, under the Command of M. de Gennes, written by François Froger, published in French and in English in 1698, relates the three years of travel of this young French explorer, engineer and hydrographer, who was nineteen years old at the date of departure. The author describes the colonies and harbors he visited, the people he met as well as the fruits, plants and animals he discovered.

The book describes a travel from La Rochelle to the island of Gorée, then through the Gambia River and towards Cape Verde. From Cape Verde, the ships headed towards Brazil and landed in Rio de Janeiro. The ships then traveled through Patagonia and the Strait of Magellan. Changing course, they landed in Salvador, Bahia. The ships subsequently traveled through Cayenne and the Caribbean, visiting Martinique, Saint Lucia, Saint-Vincent, and Guadeloupe. On their return journey, they crossed the Azores and landed in La Rochelle. Froger provides information on the customs, flora, and fauna of every area he encountered.

== Genesis ==
The young François Froger had forever had a strong desire to travel. He took lessons in order to realize his aim, and studied drawing, mathematics and the history of voyages. The expedition on the squadron of M. de Gennes, aboard the ship The English Falcon, enabled Froger to put into practice the lessons he had learned. His relation is based on the notes he took during the voyage for his personal education. After his return, when he realized that none of his companions told about their expedition, he decided to publish his own relation. In the dedicatory epistle to Seigneur Phélypeaux compte de Maurepas, Secretary of State for the Navy under Louis XIV, Froger expressed his desire to be useful to his country. His goal was to produce a simple and exact relation, without any useless details.

== Motives of the voyage ==
=== Commercial ===
The motive of this voyage was primarily commercial. Once the fleet reaches the Strait of Magellan, Froger interrupts his narrative and tells the story of the origin and purpose of the expedition. He tells that, around the year 1686, after having attempted to make a fortune in the North Sea, actually the Atlantic Ocean, buccaneers from Santo Domingo decided to sail to the South Sea, the Pacific Ocean, where they knew they would find more wealth. To do so, they had two options: to go through the land, or through the Strait of Magellan. Their fear of the Indians combined with the uncertainty to find appropriate ships once the crossing done, incited them to opt for the second solution. Having passed through the Strait of Magellan, they took several vessels and demanded ransoms in order to collect provisions. Then, they settled for a while on an island to consume their provisions before going back to the coasts to take other boats. Froger continues and explains that after seven years living such a life, some of the buccaneers wanted to get back to the Atlantic Ocean and their country of origin. They loaded their goods on a vessel which they lost in the Strait of Magellan. Consequently, they spent at about ten months to build a new boat and finally arrived in Cayenne. There, some settled with the goods they still possessed, but four or five of them wanted to undertake a second voyage, and came back to France to tell their adventures. One of them addressed M. de Gennes who went to Paris and defended his project at the Court. The project of the expedition was accepted and the king furnished the necessary ships. Thus, the goal of the voyage was to bring back richness from the western coast of America.

=== Political ===
Another reason to undertake this voyage was political. At the time of this expedition, namely between 1695 and 1697, France and Spain were at war. Froger tells that the Spanish were able to make war against the French thanks to the wealth they found in New Spain and in Peru. If the French had access to this wealth themselves, they could face the Spanish more easily, and thence reestablish peace.

== Summary ==
In June 1695, six vessels leave La Rochelle in France: The English Falcon, The Sun of Africa, The Seditious, The Corvette-Felicity, The Glutton-Pink and The Fruitful-Pink. At the beginning of July, they stop near the island of Gorée off Dakar, where Froger describes the way of living of the “Negros” and includes a map of the island. They reach the Gambia River at the end of the month. Before setting sail, they destroy the Fort Saint-Jacques of the English. At the end of the month of August, Froger relates the increasing number of ill people aboard, and the need to stop on an island of the Cape Verde group where the air is healthier. During the first days of October, they head towards Brazil and arrive in Rio de Janeiro on 28 November 1695. Froger encloses a map of the coast of Brazil and a drawing of their arrival in Rio de Janeiro, also called Saint-Sébastien at the time. He also describes and draws new fruits that he discovers.

In January 1696, the fleet sails to the Strait of Magellan. During the journey, they meet Patagones, and Froger describes their habits and customs. Then he draws some maps of the bays and caps they go through and they arrive at the Strait of Magellan at the end of February 1696. The fleet attempts several times to go through the strait during March and April, but winds are unfavourable. Because of a lack of food and hope, they decide to go back to Brazil in order to search for richnesses elsewhere. In early June, they arrive on the island of Saint-Anne, but the Portuguese threat impedes them to stop at Rio de Janeiro. In July, they arrive at All Saints’ Bay, in the city of Salvador, Bahia.

In September, they stop in Cayenne. Then they wanted to go to Suriname in order to collect goods, but Dutch vessels prevent them from doing so. Hence, they opt for a cruise in the Caribbean. In November 1696, they arrive in Martinique where they unload and clean their ships. In December, they go to Saint Lucia, then to Saint-Vincent, and finally come back to Martinique in January 1697. They stay there for one month in order to gather goods and then move to Guadeloupe in early February. Finally, they pass through the Azores islands in March before returning to La Rochelle on 21 April 1697.

Froger gives diverse and numerous descriptions in his relation. He relates the battles, diseases, slave trade, customs of the people he meets and the fruits and animals he discovers. His relation also includes maps, plans and drawings.

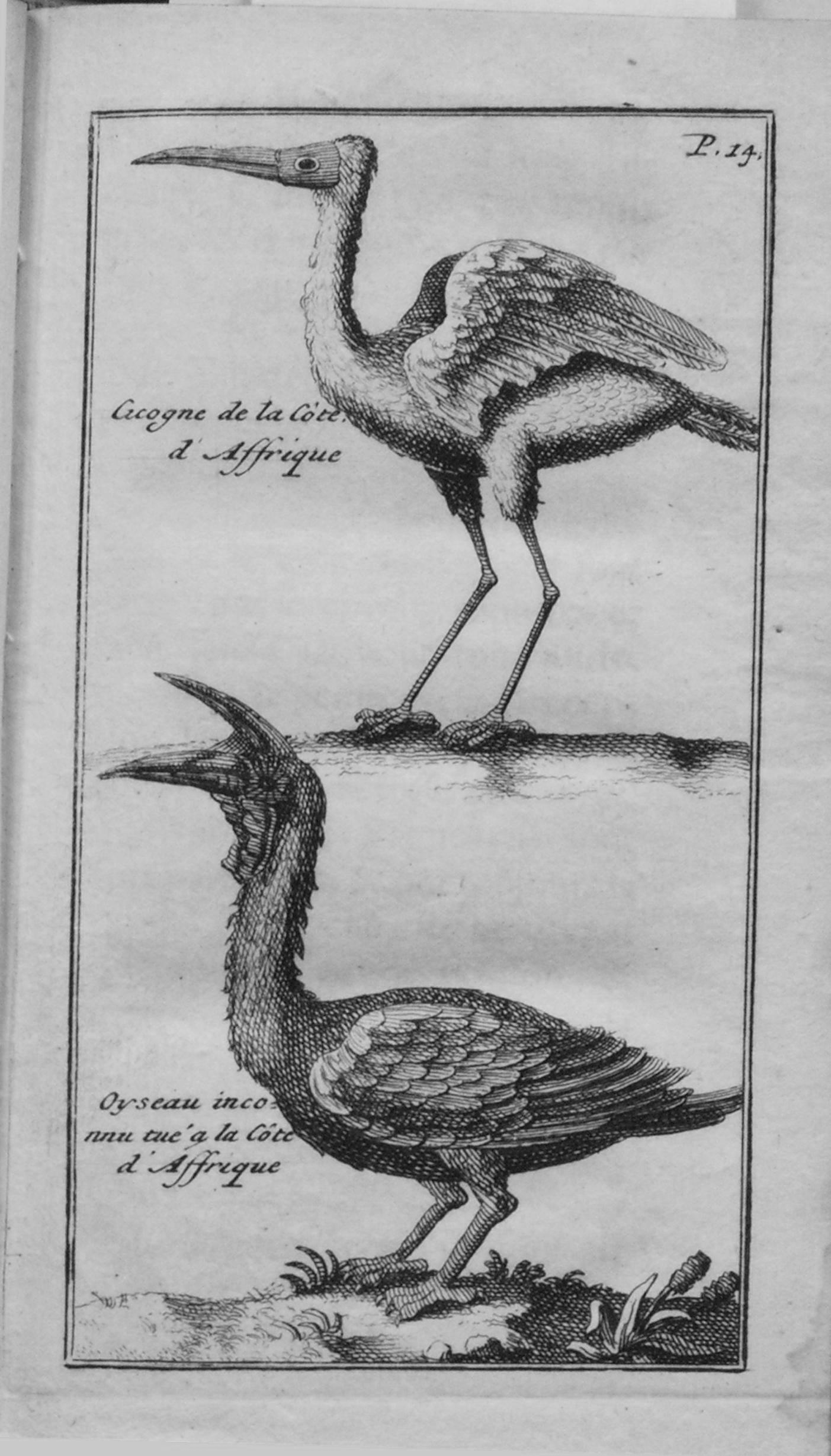
p. 14

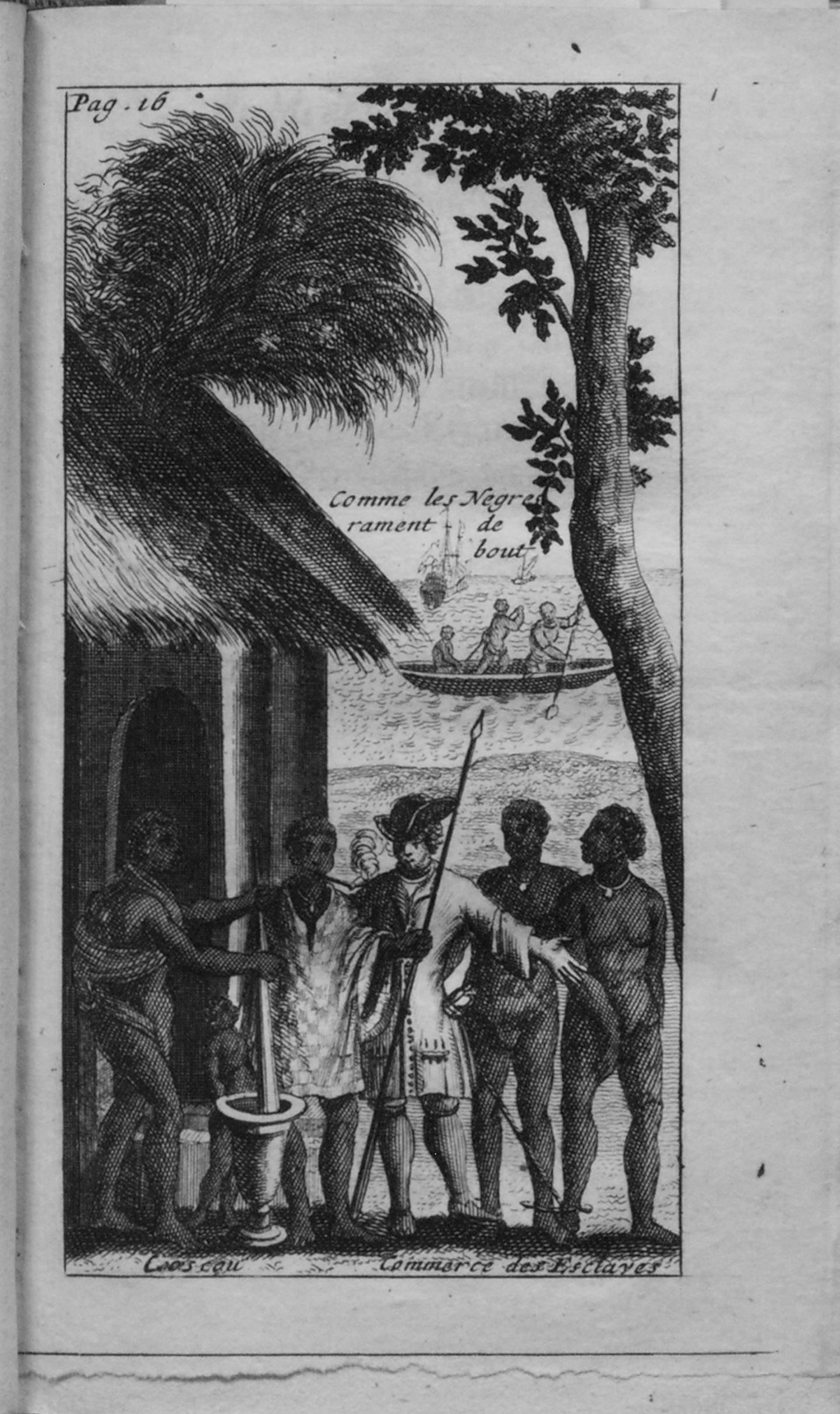
p. 16

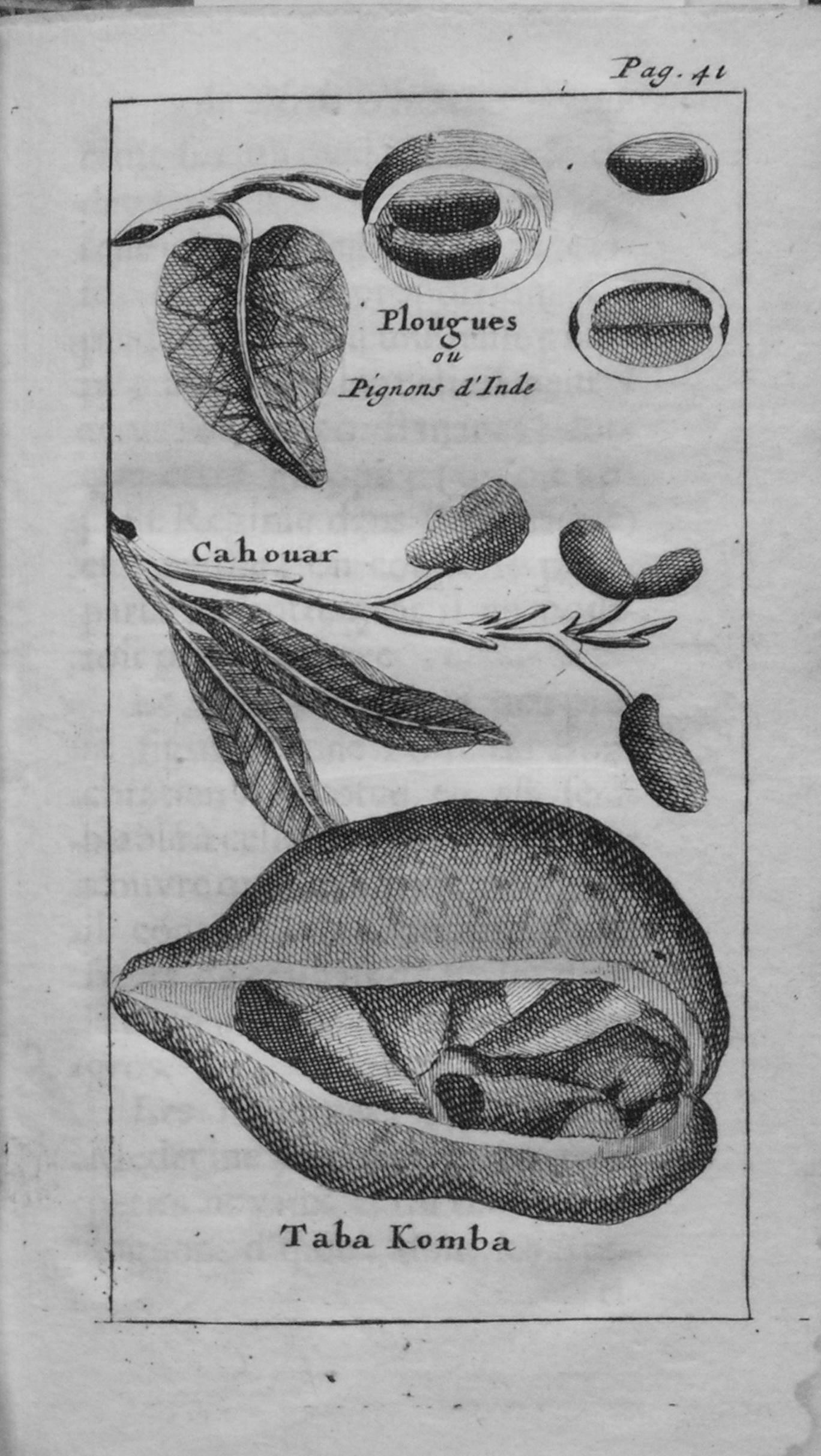
p. 41

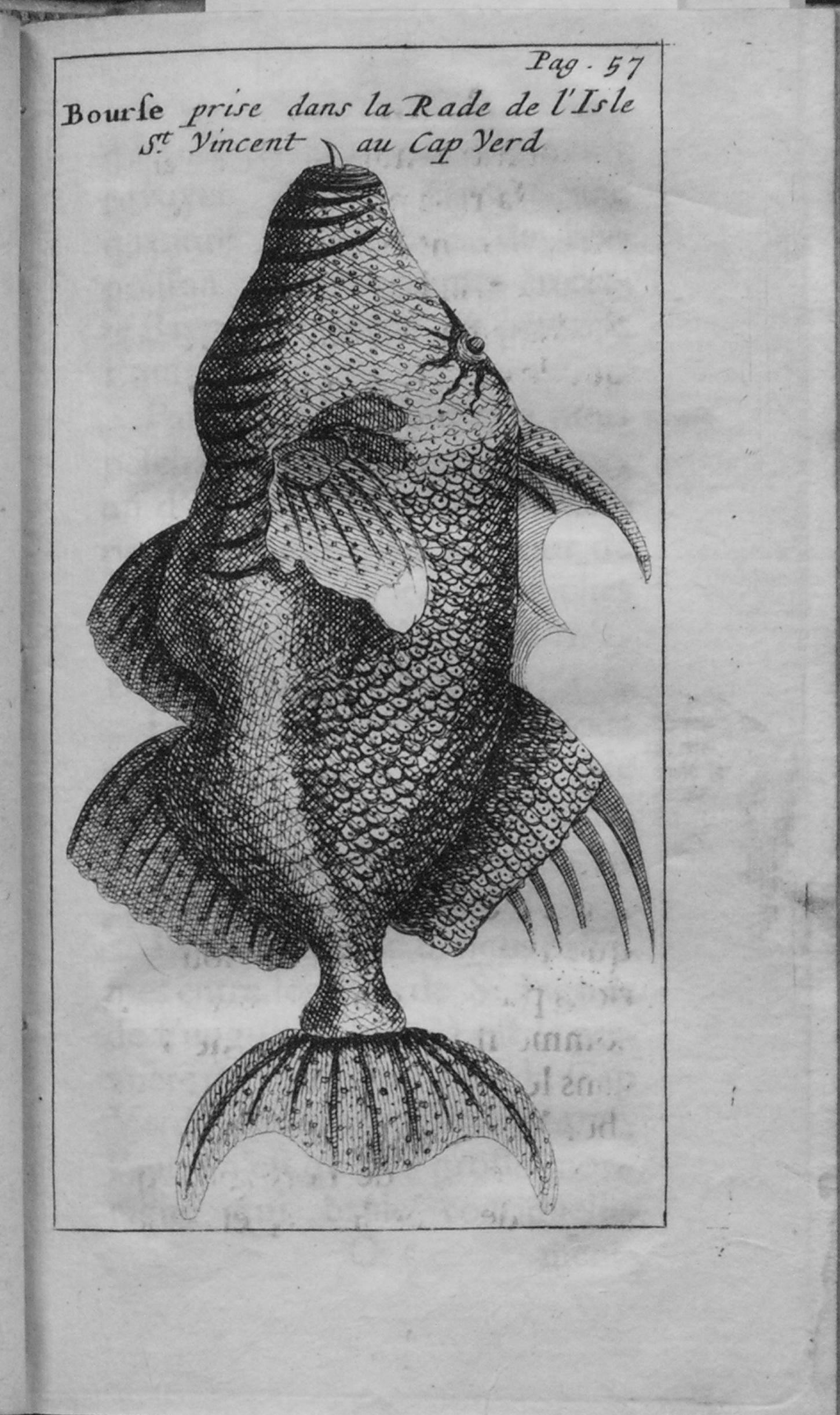
p. 57

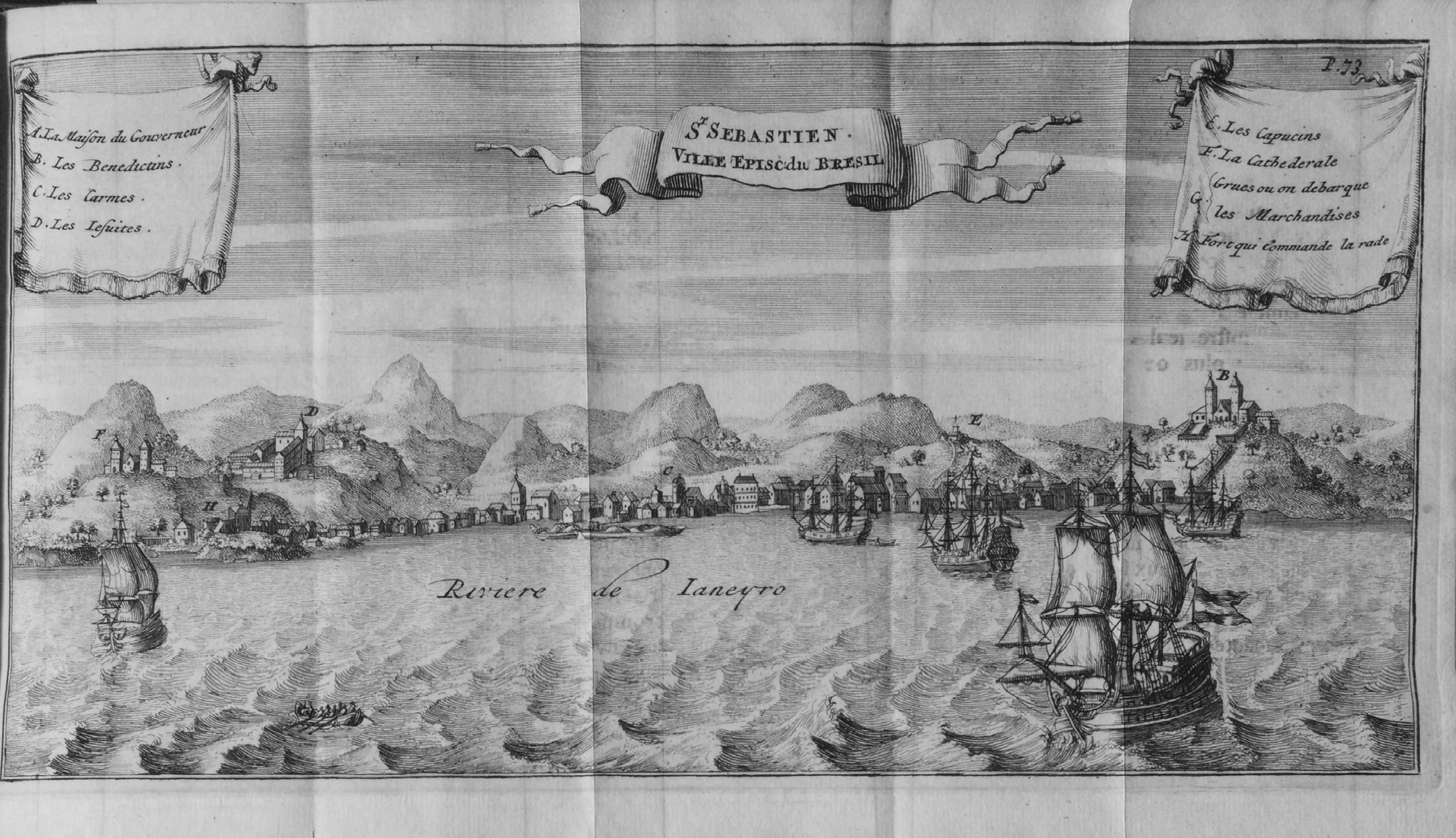
p. 73

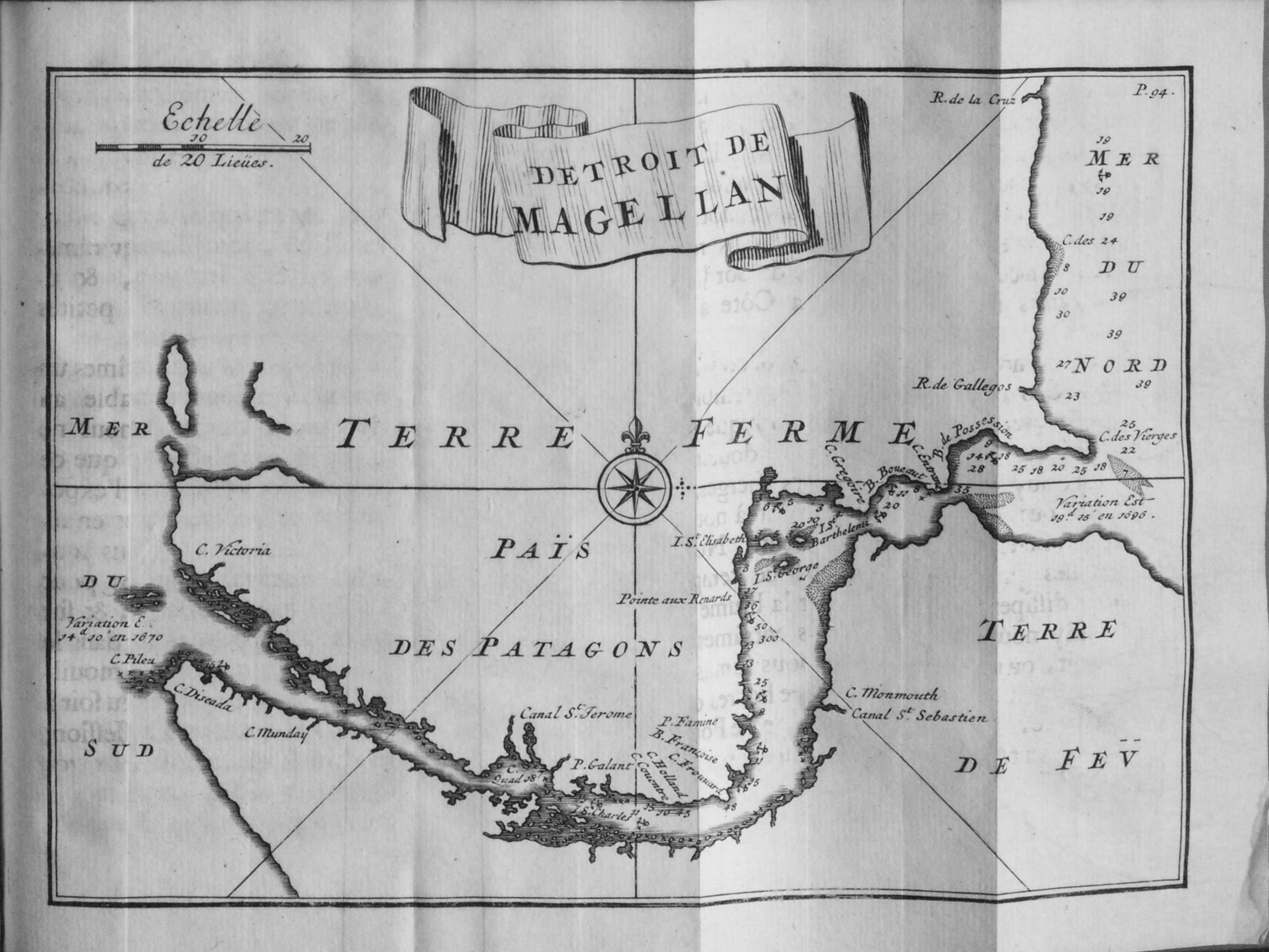
p. 94

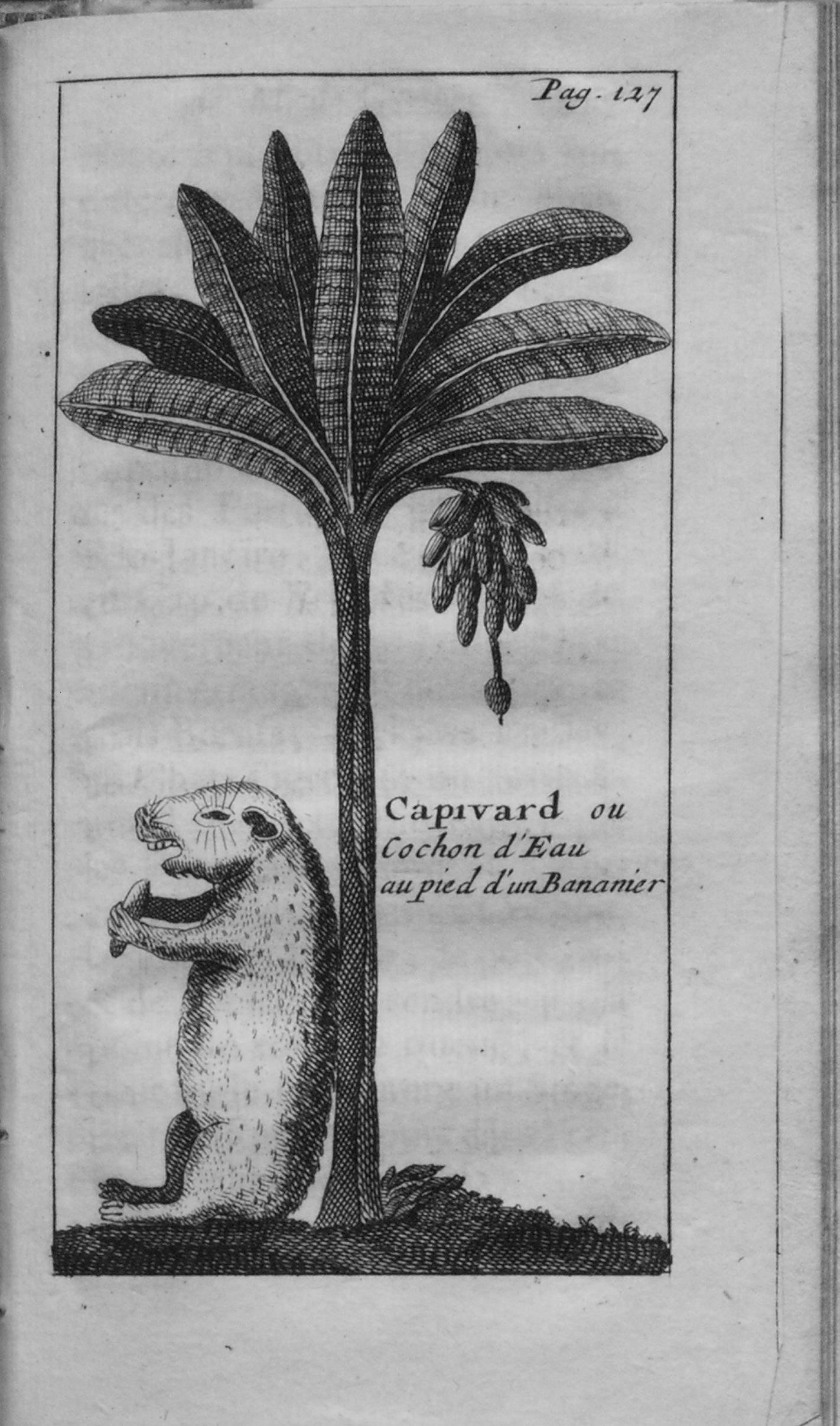
p. 127

== Places explored ==
- La Rochelle (place of departure)
- Cape Verde
- Gambia
- Rio de Janeiro
- Strait of Magellan
- Salvador, Bahia (All Saints’ Bay)
- Cayenne
- Martinique
- Saint Lucia
- Saint-Vincent
- Guadeloupe

== Reception ==
Few secondary sources comment on the relation written by Froger. However, in the Biographie Universelle Ancienne et Moderne (Michaud, 1856), it can be read that the Relation of a Voyage was considered as truthful and interesting. Its simplicity, as well as the maps and plans, prove the veracity of the narration In Histoire Littéraire du Maine (Haureau, 1872), the popularity of the work is evaluated on the basis of the great number of editions. The lack of details and extensive descriptions can also be considered as evidence of the truthfulness of the relation. Moreover, this relation was the first to describe a voyage by the French to the Strait of Magellan, and it was considered as the forerunner of numerous expeditions through the same strait afterwards. Finally, Froger’s work is characterized not as a mere administrative log book, but as a particular, original and dynamic narrative.

== Sources ==
- Michaud, J.F. (1856) Biographie Universelle Ancienne et Moderne. Madame C. Desplaces : Paris. (p. 224). Available in French Wikisource
- Haureau, B. (1872) Histoire Littéraire du Maine. Dumoulin: Paris. (p. 32) Available in Google Books
- Pritchard, J. (2002). The French West Indies During the Nine Years' War, 1688-1697: A Review and Reappraisal. French Colonial History, 2(1), 45-59.
- Cottias M., Cunin E. and de Almeida Mendes A. (2010) Les Traites et les escalvages. Perspectives historiques et contemporaines. Karthala Editions. (p. 55-56)
