= Desolación Island =

Island in Chile

Coordinates: 53.10°S 73.90°W

Desolation Island
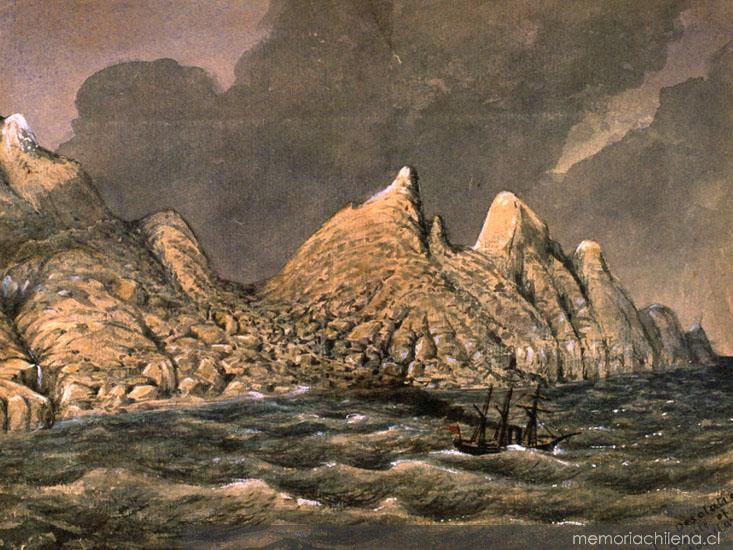
- As depicted in an 1843 watercolour

- Location within Southern Patagonia

Geography
- Location: Chile
- Archipelago: Tierra del Fuego
- Area: 1,352 km^{2} (522 sq mi)
- Coastline: 866.1 km (538.17 mi)
- Highest elevation: 1,128 m (3701 ft)
- Highest point: Monte Harte Dyke

Administration
- Chile

Demographics
- Population: 0

Additional information
- NGA UFI=-879556

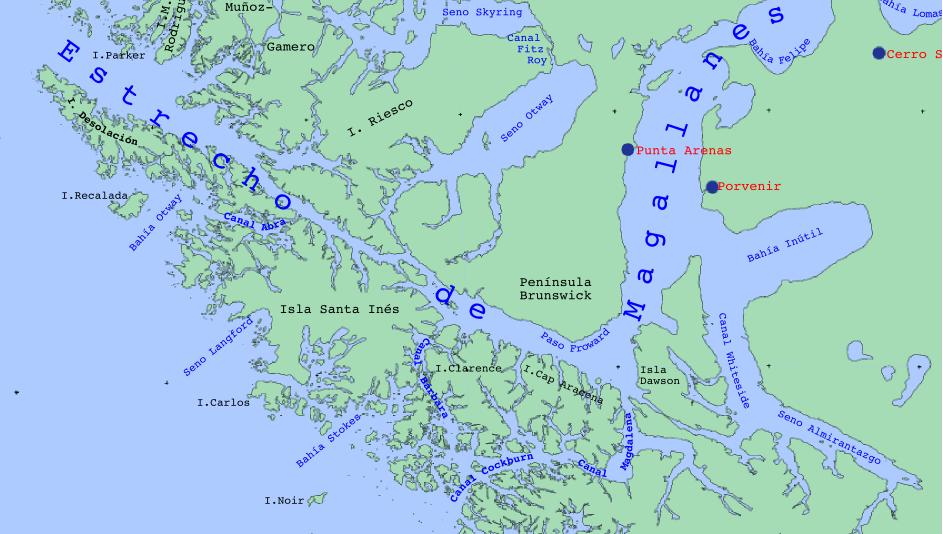

Desolación Island (Spanish: Isla Desolación) (Spanish for Desolation) is an island at the western end of the Strait of Magellan in the Magallanes y la Antártica Chilena Region, Chile.

Its northwestern point is called Cabo Pilar (Cape Pillar), and marks the entrance to the Strait of Magellan. Off Cape Pillar are four rocks in the sea, called Islotes Evangelistas (the islets of the Evangelists).

== Desolación Island in fiction ==
The Douglas Preston and Lincoln Child novel The Ice Limit described an expedition to Isla Desolación near Cape Horn in Chile. The map in the (paperback) edition incorrectly identifies easterly Isla Wollastone as Isla Desolación. The authors, in a note, say this is intentional.

In James Michener's novel Hawaii (and its 1966 film adaptation) depicts an attempt by a sailing ship to pass the Straits of Magellan, which a skipper at the Falklands Islands (Captain Janders in the film version) describing the western exit past Desolation Island and the Evangels the most difficult part of the passage.

In Herman Melville's novel Moby-Dick, narrator Ishmael recalls a marble tablet at a whalemen's chapel in New Bedford which pays homage to a whaleman named John Talbot, who was lost overboard "near the Isle of Desolation, off Patagonia".

In Patrick O'Brian's novel Blue at the Mizzen, a British man-of-war is sent on a peace time mission to Chile and the Straits of Magellan.

In the Jackie Chan Adventures animated television series in Season 2 Episode 24 - Scouts Honor, Jackie Chan teleports the episode's villain, Vanessa Barone, with the Eye of Aurora to Desolación Island, saying that it is a little island off the coast of Chile and is "one of the most remote spots on earth".

== See also ==
- List of islands of Chile
