= Evangelistas Lighthouse =

Historic lighthouse on the Evangelistas Islets in southern Chile, first lit in 1896

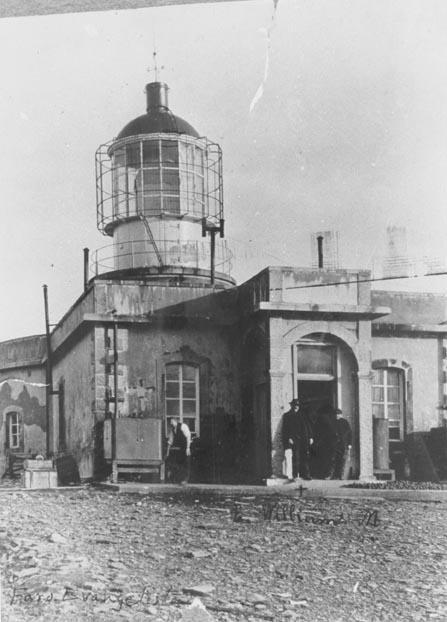
- Evangelistas Lighthouse at the beginning of the 20th century
- Location: Evangelistas Islets, Pacific entrance to Strait of Magellan, Chile
- Coordinates: 52°23′10″S 75°05′45″W

Tower
- Constructed: 1896
- Construction: steel tower
- Height: 13 metres (43 ft)
- Shape: cylindrical tower with lantern and gallery on a single-storey concrete and stone keeper's quarters
- Markings: white lower tower with red horuzontal band, white lantern and balcony with red trim
- Heritage: Historical Monument of Chile
- Racon: N

Light
- First lit: 18 September 1896
- Focal height: 58 metres (190 ft)
- Lens: 500 mm
- Range: 56 kilometres (35 mi)
- Characteristic: flashing: period 10s, flash 0.3s, eclipse 9.7s, 194-250 white, 250-260 no light, 260-312.5 white, 312.5-318 no light, 318-186 white, 186-194 no light

The Evangelistas Lighthouse (Spanish: Faro Evangelistas) is one of the most exposed, isolated, and least accessible lighthouses in the world. Sited on the Evangelistas Islets on Chile's continental shelf in the south-eastern Pacific Ocean, it is the landfall light for ships crossing the Pacific eastwards to traverse the Strait of Magellan. A notable engineering accomplishment of its time, it was built by Scottish engineer George Henry Slight who had been recruited by Chilean President Jorge Montt, through the Chilean ambassador in London Agustin Ross, in order to establish a lighthouse service in Chile. Work on the lighthouse commenced on 30 April 1895. Slight's diary records his impressions of the Evangelistas on his arrival there:

I never imagined seeing something so wild and desolate as those emerging dark rocks in the middle of the raging waves. To see these stormy craggy rocks was frightening. With a dim light on the horizon we could see large waves crashing heavily in the western part of the islands: a vision that hardly anyone can imagine...

Slight had problems with bad weather, the supply of materials and equipment, unrest and lack of discipline among his workers, disease and living conditions. Most of the 80 workers were Croats and Chilotes, ten of whom were dismissed for insubordination. By 18 September 1896 the lighthouse had been sufficiently completed for Jorge Montt to visit for a ceremonial turning-on of the light.

The lighthouse complex includes a weather station and a telecommunications station. It was restored in 1995–96 with the fiberglass lantern then in use replaced with a replica of the original lantern. The site and tower are not open to the public.

The importance of the lighthouse at the beginning of the 20th century was remarked upon by the United States Hydrographic Office:

When approaching Magellan Strait it is of the utmost importance that Los Evangelistas be sighted. These islands are a good landfall both by day and by night, as they are 170 feet high, and the light is visible 20 miles.

== See also ==
- Lighthouses in Chile
- List of lighthouses in Chile
