= Lighthouses in Chile =

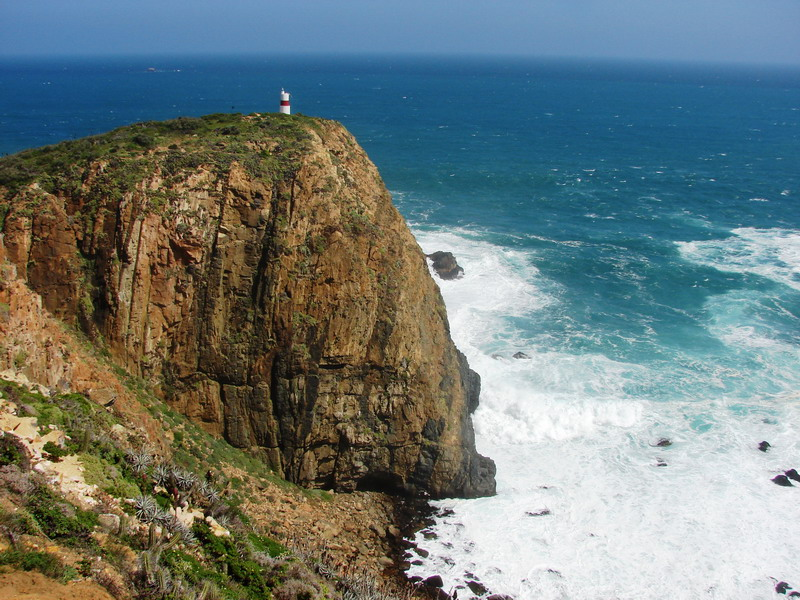
Punta Tablas lighthouse, 7 km north of Los Vilos in Central Chile

Chile has a large and intricate coastline of 4000 km with myriads of islands, islets, straits, bays, and fjords.

Moreover, three waterways between the Pacific Ocean and the Atlantic Ocean, namely the Strait of Magellan, the Beagle Channel and the Drake Passage, pass the Chilean coasts. In order to mark dangerous coastlines, hazardous shoals, reefs, and safe entries to harbors, the Chilean authorities maintain 650 lighthouses from the border with Peru to the Atlantic Ocean.

== History ==
On 18 September 1857, the first lighthouse in Chile, the "Faro Angeles", was inaugurated in Valparaíso.

In 1867, the Dane Enrique Siemsen was appointed chief of the "Servicio de Faros". He built the Faro Corona in Ancud, Punta Caldera in Atacama, Punta Tortugas in Coquimbo, Isla Quiriquina in Quiriquina, Punta Galera and Punta Niebla in Corral.

The first lighthouses in Chile used colza oil as fuel, but in 1878 it was replaced by Bunsen burners.

George Slight designed and built in the 1890s more than 70 of today's historic lighthouses of Chile. He was a Scottish engineer who moved to Chile and eventually became the head of the Chilean Maritime Signaling Service.

== Present ==
As of 2013, the National Geospatial-Intelligence Agency (NGA) lists 650 lighthouses in Chile and according to Faros de Chile 18 of them were inhabited in 2009.

=== Lightvessels ===
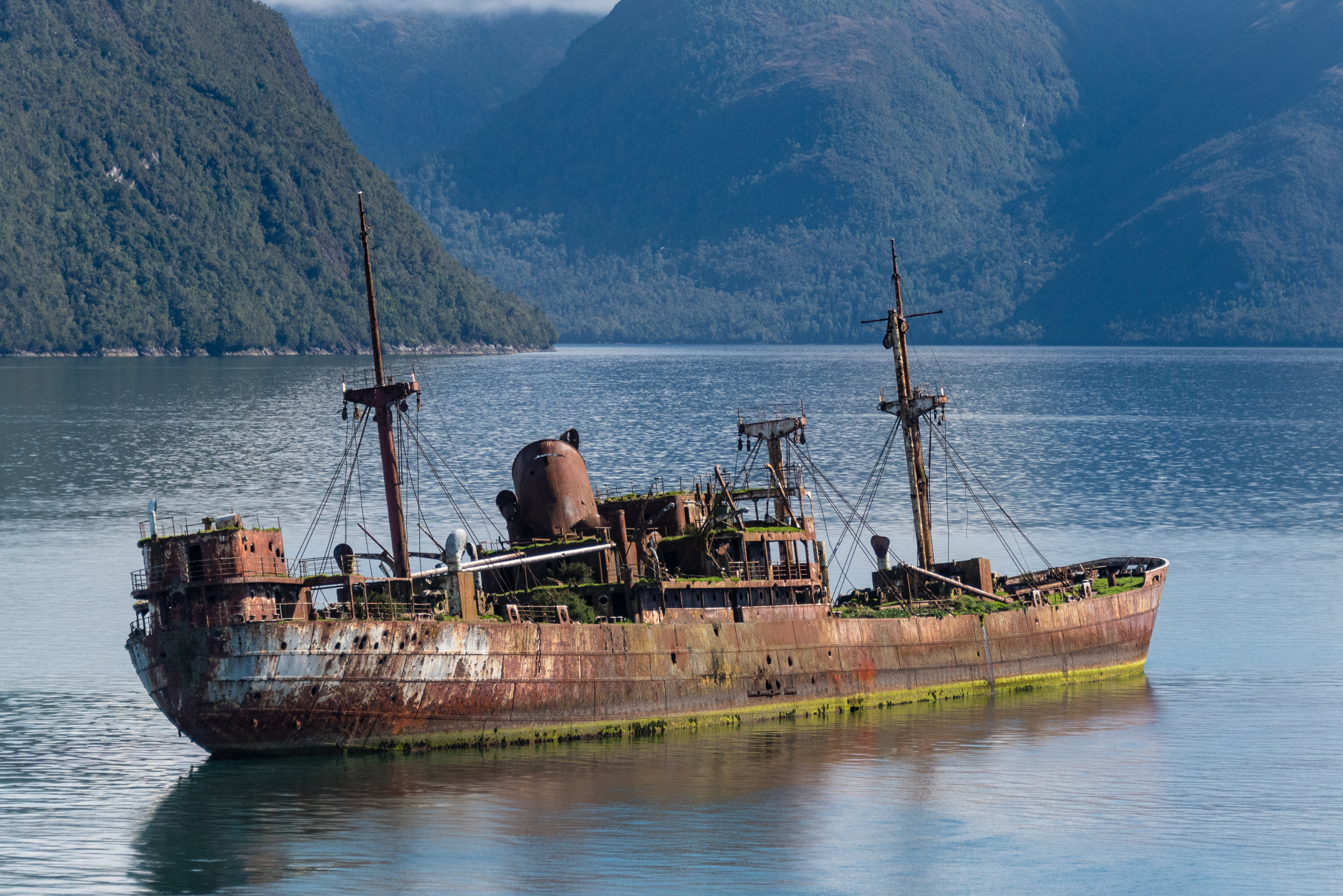
The Capitán Leonidas, sitting firmly on the flattened top of an underwater mountain called Bajo Cotopaxi in the Messier Channel of Chile, serves as a warning, both as shipwreck and lighthouse: 2068/G 1552(Bajo Cotopaxi) 48°44'45" S, 74°25'44" W

There are no lightvessels in Chile, but 2 shipwrecks are used as a basis for lighthouses: the County of Peebles is used as breakwater in the harbour of Punta Arenas, and the Capitán Leonidas is located in the Messier Channel.

=== Official information and administration ===
The Chilean official list of lighthouses is the Lista de Faros de la costa de Chile, Costa Oriental de Tierra del Fuego y Territorio Antártico published (as Nr. 3007) by the Hydrographic and Oceanographic Service of the Chilean Navy (SHOA)

Navigational aids in Chile are provided by the Servicio de Señalización Marítima [Maritime Signalling Service], a department of the Dirección de Seguridad y Operaciones Marítimas (Dirsomar) [Directorate of Maritime Security and Operations], of the Dirección General del Territorio Marítimo y de Marina Mercante (Directemar) [Directorate General of the Maritime Territory and the Merchant Marine] of the Chilean Navy.

=== Maintenance ships ===
In 1900, the ship Meteoro was built in Chile for the maintenance of lighthouses.

Today, the Chilean Navy ship George Slight (BRS-63) is in service to serve the lighthouses.

== NGA List of lights ==
The United States' National Geospatial-Intelligence Agency (NGA) lists 650 lighthouses (and 26 Argentine lighthouses in the Beagle Channel zone) in the Chilean list of lights. This NGA list does not include the lighthouses in the Lakes of Chile nor any Chilean lighthouses in Antarctica (see List of Antarctic and subantarctic islands).

== See also ==
Media related to Lighthouses in Chile at Wikimedia Commons

- List of fjords, channels, sounds and straits of Chile
- List of islands of Chile
