= George Henry Slight =

19/20th-century Scottish engineer who designed the lighthouses of Chile

George Henry Slight (30 September 1859 – 26 June 1934) was a Scottish engineer who established the Chilean lighthouse service.

== Early years ==
Slight, the son of George Slight and Elizabeth Marshall, grew up in Edinburgh in an engineering family. After an apprenticeship as a mechanical engineer, he worked on the steamers plying the route between Britain and India. He subsequently worked for several years with Trinity House, which was responsible for the lighthouse service in England and Wales.

== Chile ==
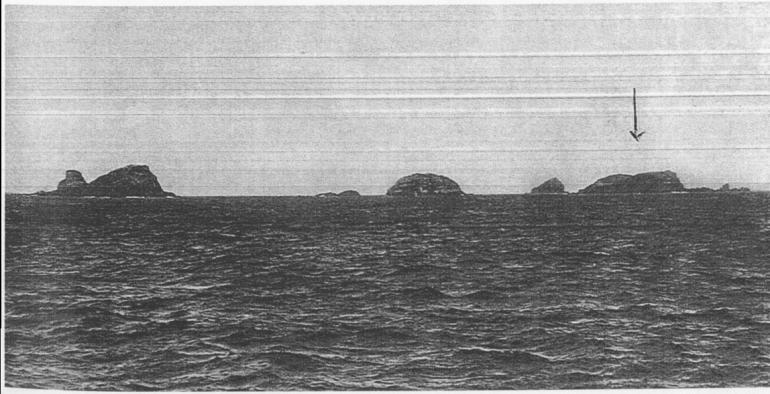
Photograph of the Evangelistas Islets taken 1893 by G. Slight

In 1893 Slight was recruited by the Chilean ambassador in London, Agustin Ross, who had been ordered by the President of Chile, Jorge Montt, to find someone suitable to establish a system of lighthouses in the country. Slight's first task on arrival in Chile was to build a lighthouse on the Evangelistas Islets at the western entrance to the Strait of Magellan in the southern part of the country, which he accomplished when the Evangelistas Lighthouse was completed in 1896.

Slight subsequently settled in Valparaíso. He was put in charge of the new Lighthouse Authority of Chile and went on to build some 72 lighthouses along the Chilean coast. He eventually became the head of the Chilean Maritime Signalling Service. In 1916 he retired from the maritime service, but continued in an advisory role. He married Charlotte Leigh in Valparaiso, by whom he had two sons. His gravestone in the Valparaiso General Cemetery bears the English epitaph "His lights still shine over the waters of the Pacific Ocean". He is commemorated in the names of the George Slight Lighthouse Museum at Punta Angeles, Valparaiso, and the Chilean Navy's rescue and salvage ship George Slight.

== See also ==
- Lighthouses in Chile
- List of lighthouses in Chile
