= Patagons =

Mythological giants from Patagonia

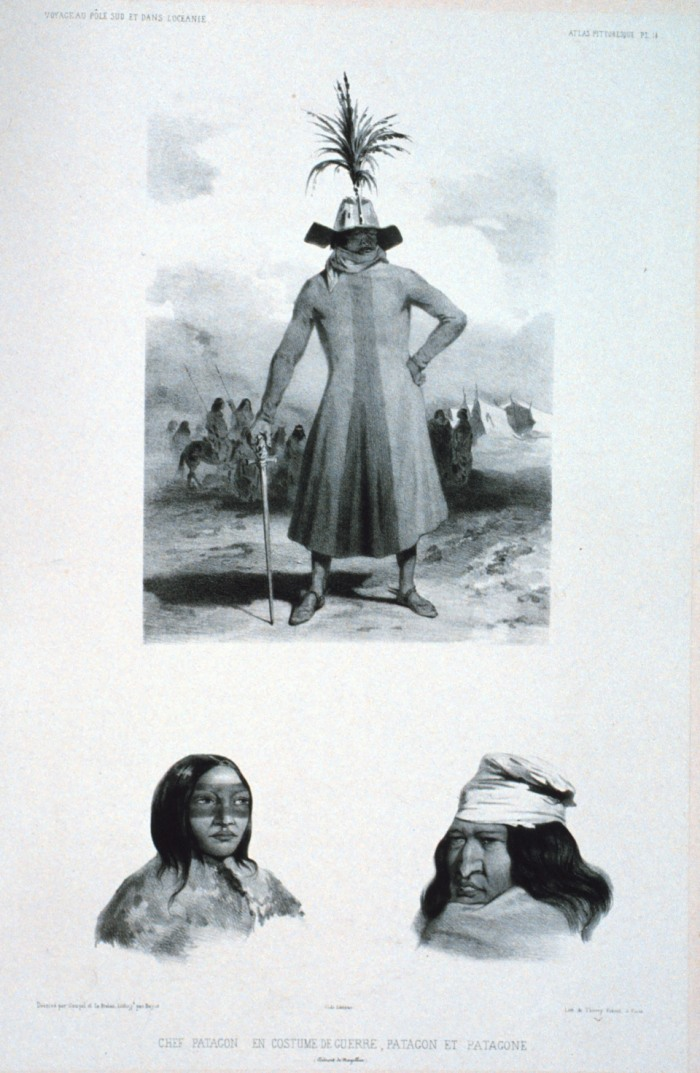
1840s (fanciful) illustration of a Patagon chief from near the Strait of Magellan, bedecked in costume of war; from Voyage au pôle Sud et dans l'Océanie... by French explorer Jules Dumont d'Urville

The Patagons or Patagonian giants were a mythical race of giant humans rumoured to be living in Patagonia described in early European accounts. They were said to have exceeded at least double normal human height, with some accounts giving heights of 13 to 15 feet (4 to 4.5 m) or more. Tales of these people maintained a hold upon European conceptions of the region for nearly 300 years.

== History ==
The first mention of these people came from the voyage of Ferdinand Magellan and his crew, who claimed to have seen them while exploring the coastline of South America en route to the Maluku Islands in their circumnavigation of the world in the 1520s. Antonio Pigafetta, one of the expedition's few survivors and the chronicler of Magellan's expedition, wrote in his account about their encounter with natives twice a normal person's height:

One day we suddenly saw a naked man of giant stature on the shore of the port, dancing, singing, and throwing dust on his head. The captain-general [i.e., Magellan] sent one of our men to the giant so that he might perform the same actions as a sign of peace. Having done that, the man led the giant to an islet where the captain-general was waiting. When the giant was in the captain-general's and our presence he marveled greatly, and made signs with one finger raised upward, believing that we had come from the sky. He was so tall that we reached only to his waist, and he was well proportioned...

Pigafetta also recorded that Magellan had bestowed on these people the name "Patagão" (i.e. "Patagon", or Patagoni in Pigafetta's Italian plural), but he did not further elaborate on his reasons for doing so. The original word would probably be in Ferdinand Magellan's native Portuguese (patagão) or the Spanish of his men (patagón). Since Pigafetta's time, the assumption that this derived from pata or foot took hold, and "Patagonia" was interpreted to mean "Land of the Bigfeet". However, this etymology remains questionable, since, amongst other things, the meaning of the suffix -gon is unclear. It is now understood that the name comes from a character in Primaleón, a very popular 1512 Spanish chivalric romance novel, a type of fiction said to be widely read by Magellan and his conquistador colleagues. Nevertheless, the name "Patagonia" stuck, as did the notion that the local inhabitants were giants; maps of the New World of the time sometimes attached the label regio gigantum ("region of giants") to the area.

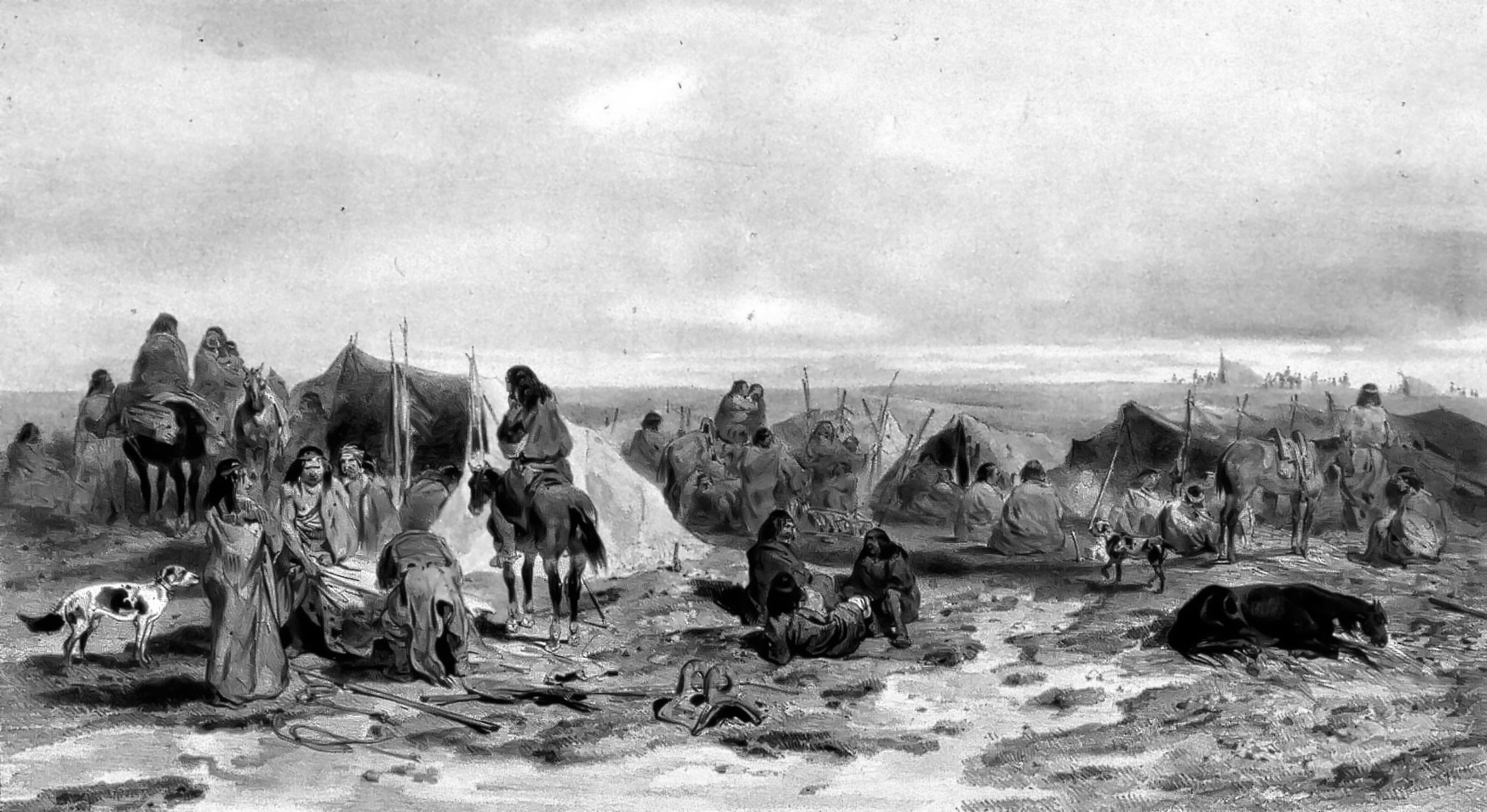
1840s illustration of Patagon encampment; from account by French explorer Jules Dumont d'Urville

In 1579, Francis Drake's ship chaplain, Francis Fletcher, wrote about meeting very tall Patagonians, of "7 foote and a halfe".

In the 1590s, Anthony Knivet claimed he had seen dead bodies 12 feet (3.7 m) long in Patagonia.

Also in the 1590s, William Adams, an Englishman aboard a Netherlander ship rounding Tierra del Fuego, reported a violent encounter between his ship's crew and unnaturally tall natives.

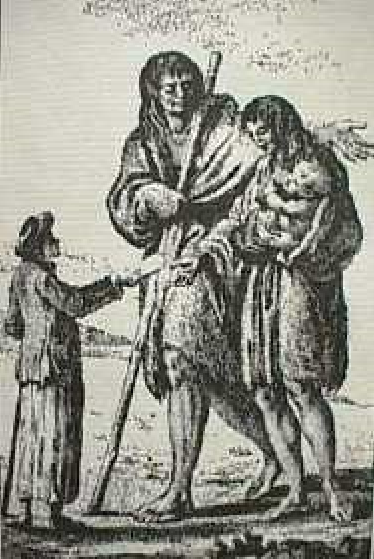
A sailor giving a Patagonian woman a piece of bread for her baby

The Dutch sailors Sebald de Weert in 1598, Olivier van Noort in 1599, and Joris van Spilbergen in 1615 claimed that giants were living in Patagonia.

In 1766, a rumour leaked out upon their return to Great Britain that the crew of HMS Dolphin, captained by Commodore John Byron, had seen a tribe of 9-foot-tall (2.7 m) natives in Patagonia when they passed by there on their circumnavigation of the globe. However, when a newly edited revised account of the voyage came out in 1773, the Patagonians were recorded as being 6 feet 6 inches (1.98 m)—very tall, especially by 18th century standards, but by no means giants.

== Explanations ==
In 1615, a grave with bones of the giants in Puerto Deseado was reported by Willem Schouten and Jacob Le Maire. This claim was possibly initiated by fossil finds.

Later writers consider the Patagonian giants to have been a hoax, or at least an exaggeration and misreporting of earlier European accounts of the region.

These accounts may also refer to the Selkʼnam people. However, like that of the Tehuelche language, the language of the Selkʼnam people does not match the records of the giant's language that Magellan is claimed to have encountered. There is a photograph of a seven-foot tall Selkʼnam ("Ona") man in the US Library of Congress.

== See also ==
- Hyperborea
