= Evangelistas Islets =

Four small islands off the coast of southern Chile

Native name: Islotes Evangelistas
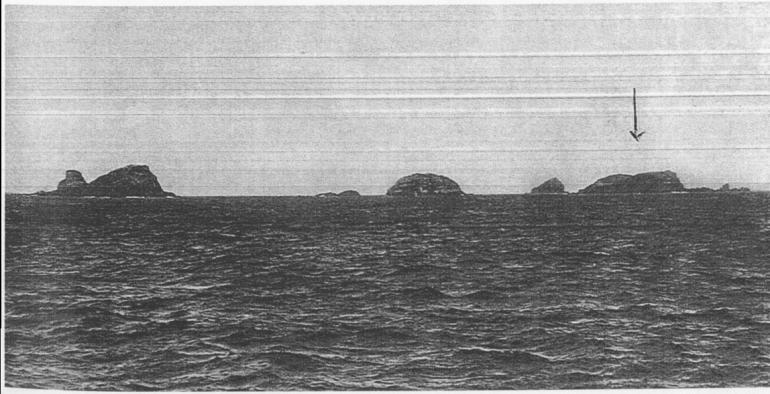
- Photo of the islets by George Henry Slight, the arrow indicating the site of the lighthouse

- Location within Southern Patagonia

Geography
- Coordinates: 52.386025°S 75.086615°W
- Adjacent to: Pacific Ocean
- Total islands: 4

Administration
- Chile
- Region: Magallanes y la Antártica Chilena
- Province: Última Esperanza
- Commune: Puerto Natales

Additional information
- NGA UFI=-882479

The Evangelistas Islets (Spanish: Islotes Evangelistas) are a group of four small, rocky islands lying on the Chilean continental shelf, some 30 km north-west of the western entrance to the Strait of Magellan, in the south-eastern Pacific Ocean, facing the full force of the "Furious Fifties". They come under the jurisdiction of the Chilean Navy which operates the Chilean Maritime Signalling Service and has maintained a presence there since the establishment of the Evangelistas Lighthouse in 1896 by Scottish engineer George Henry Slight.

On February 17, 1676, sixteen men of Pascual de Iriate's expedition were lost at Evangelistas Islets while attempting to install a bronze plaque indicating the areas ownership by the King of Spain.

== Description ==
The largest of the group is Evangelistas Grande which is about 400 metres (1,300 ft) long and wide, reaches a height of 60 metres (200 ft) and supports the lighthouse. The other, uninhabited, islets are Elcano 300 by 100 metres (980 ft × 330 ft), Lobos 400 by 150 metres (1,310 ft × 490 ft), and Pan de Azúcar 200 by 200 metres (660 ft × 660 ft). They are mainly bare rock with steep cliffs on their western sides and are exposed to strong winds and rough seas. Lobos and Elcano are home to breeding colonies of black-browed albatrosses with a combined estimate of 4670 pairs recorded in a 13 October 2002 aerial survey. The islets have been recognised as an Important Bird Area (IBA) by BirdLife International for their albatross colonies.

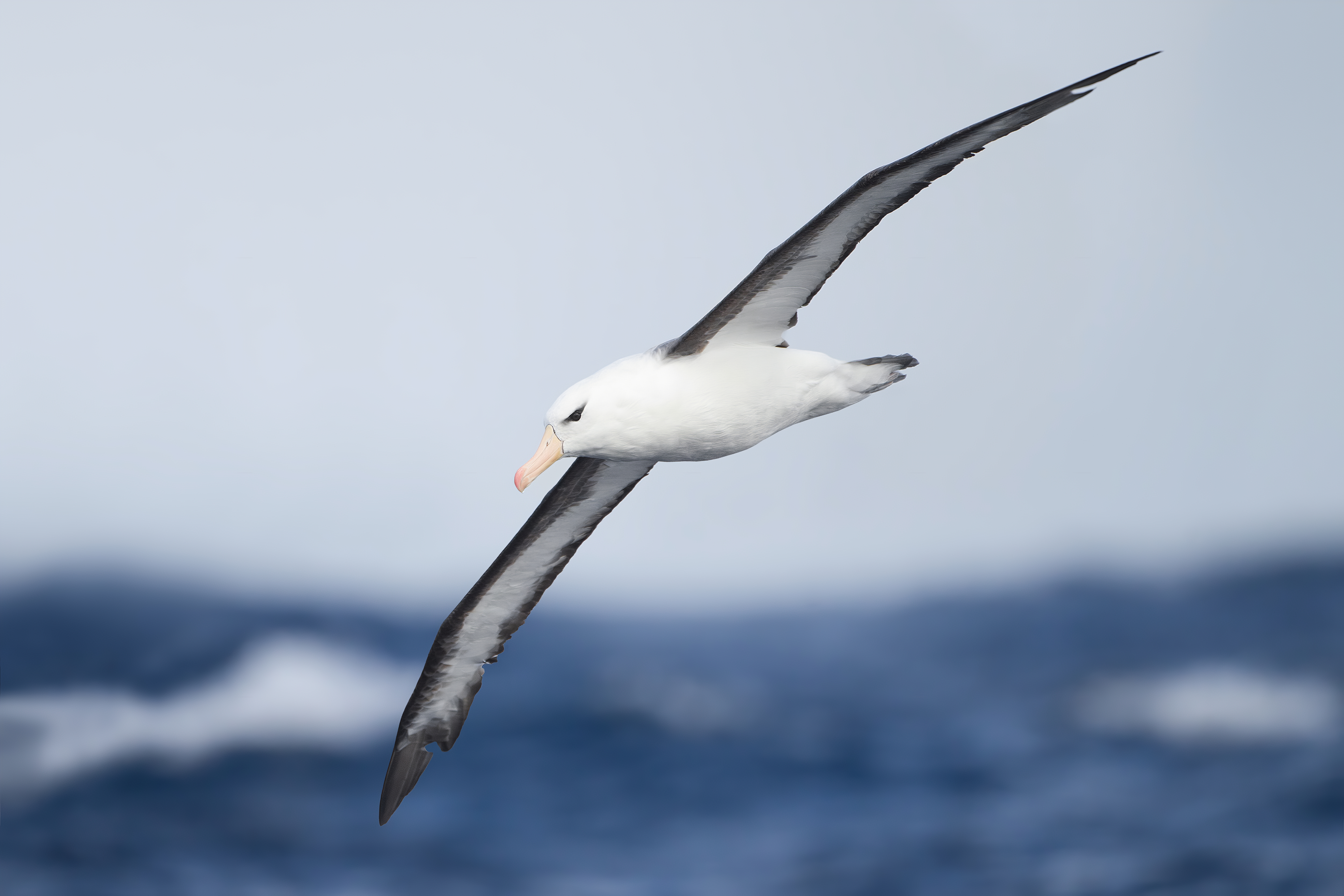
The islets are a breeding site for black-browed albatrosses

== Climate ==
Climate data for Evangelistas Islets
Month	Jan	Feb	Mar	Apr	May	Jun	Jul	Aug	Sep	Oct	Nov	Dec	Year
Mean daily maximum °C (°F)	10.6 (51.1)	10.6 (51.1)	10.5 (50.9)	9.3 (48.7)	8.1 (46.6)	6.8 (44.2)	5.9 (42.6)	6.0 (42.8)	6.4 (43.5)	7.3 (45.1)	8.3 (46.9)	9.6 (49.3)	8.3 (46.9)
Daily mean °C (°F)	8.7 (47.7)	8.8 (47.8)	8.3 (46.9)	7.2 (45.0)	6.0 (42.8)	4.8 (40.6)	4.4 (39.9)	4.4 (39.9)	4.9 (40.8)	5.5 (41.9)	6.4 (43.5)	7.6 (45.7)	6.4 (43.5)
Mean daily minimum °C (°F)	6.1 (43.0)	6.6 (43.9)	5.9 (42.6)	4.9 (40.8)	3.7 (38.7)	2.7 (36.9)	2.4 (36.3)	2.4 (36.3)	2.8 (37.0)	3.5 (38.3)	4.1 (39.4)	5.4 (41.7)	4.1 (39.4)
Average precipitation mm (inches)	233.4 (9.19)	225.2 (8.87)	275.5 (10.85)	247.7 (9.75)	215.2 (8.47)	211.9 (8.34)	216.4 (8.52)	214.1 (8.43)	224.5 (8.84)	164.7 (6.48)	170.2 (6.70)	170.9 (6.73)	2,569.7 (101.17)
Average relative humidity (%)	83	83	83	83	88	82	82	81	82	83	83	83	83
Source: Bioclimatografia de Chile

== See also ==
- List of islands of Chile
