= County of Peebles (ship) =

Four-masted, iron-hulled full-rigged ship

Coordinates: 53.17698°S 70.91746°W

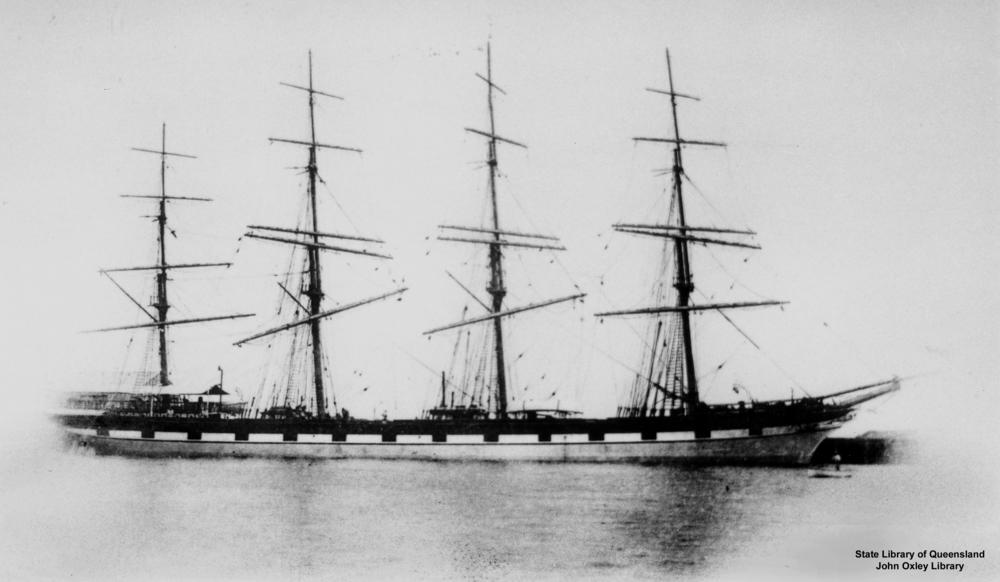
- County of Peebles

History

United Kingdom
- Name: County of Peebles
- Owner: R. & J. Craig, Glasgow
- Route: India—Great Britain
- Builder: Barclay Curle & Co., Glasgow
- Yard number: 252
- Launched: 5 July 1875
- In service: 1875
- Out of service: 1898
- Fate: Sold to Chile, 1898

Chile
- Name: Muñoz Gamero
- Acquired: 1898
- Fate: Beached as a breakwater, 1960s

General characteristics
- Type: Windjammer
- Tonnage: 1,691 GRT; 1,614 NRT
- Length: 266 ft 6 in (81.23 m)
- Beam: 38 ft 7 in (11.76 m)
- Depth: 23 ft 4 in (7.11 m)
- Sail plan: Full-rigged ship

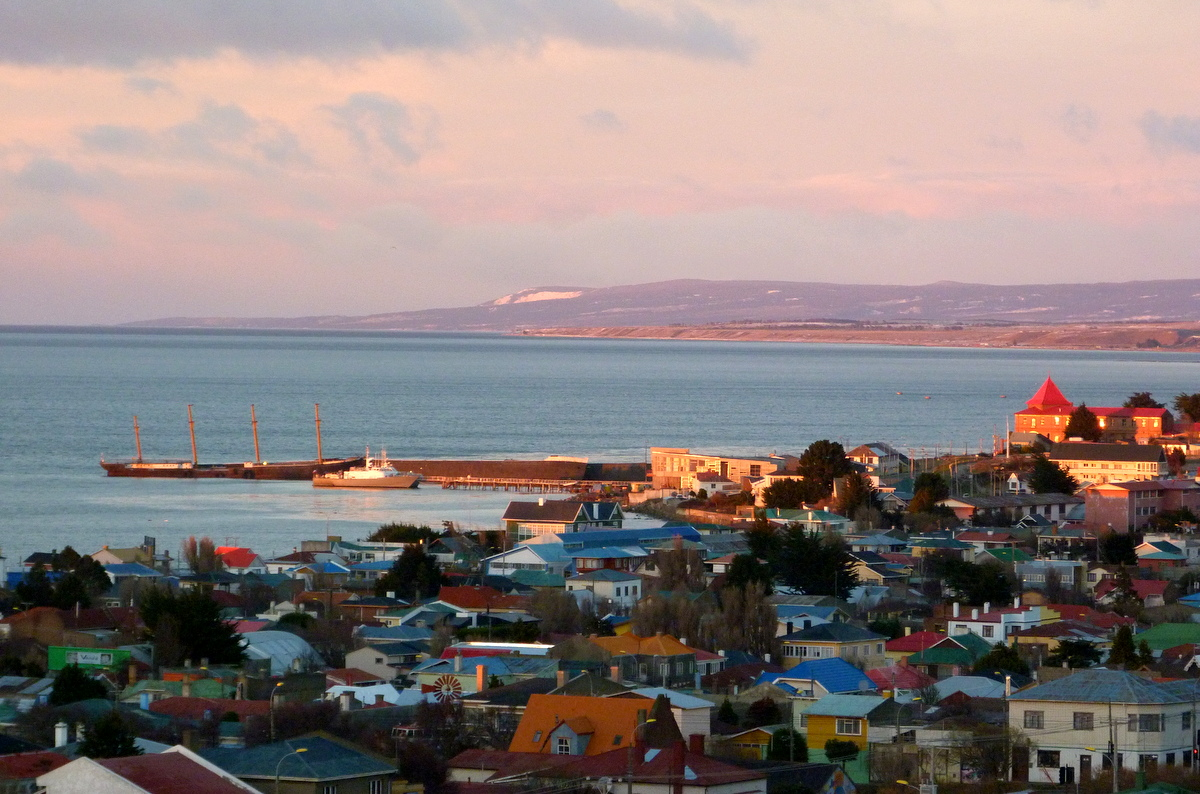
Muñoz Gamero and the Cavenga in Punta Arenas as breakwater.

The County of Peebles was the world's first four-masted, iron-hulled full-rigged ship. It was built during 1875, by Barclay Curle Shipbuilders in Glasgow, Scotland, for the shipping company R & J Craig of Glasgow. Measuring 81.2 metres (266 ft 5 in) long, with a beam of 11.8 metres (38 ft 9 in), a draught of 7.1 metres (23 ft 4 in) and a cargo capacity of 1,614 net register tons (NRT), it was a state-of-the-art windjammer when it began its use, for the jute trade between the ports of Dundee and Cardiff in Great Britain and Bombay and Calcutta / Hooghly River in East India. Its rig was 'Scottish style', with royal sails above double top-sails and single topgallants.

County of Peebles represented an important development of sailing ship design, which allowed wind-powered ships to compete successfully on long haul routes with steamships during the last quarter of the 19th century. With its success R & J Craig ordered a further eleven similar four-masted 'full-rigged ships' for the thriving Indian jute trade, forming what was referred to as the Scottish East India Line. Using the pattern of County of Peebles, the other ships ordered were also named after Scottish counties as follows: County of Caithness (launched in 1876), County of Inverness (1877), County of Cromarty (1878), County of Dumfries (1878), County of Kinross (1878), County of Selkirk (1878), County of Aberdeen (1879), County of Haddington (1879), County of Edinburgh (1885), County of Roxburgh (1886), and County of Linlithgow (1887).

In 1898, County of Peebles was sold to the Chilean Navy. Renamed Muñoz Gamero, it was used as a coal hulk at Punta Arenas on the Strait of Magellan. During the mid-1960s it was beached as a breakwater in Punta Arenas, where it lay as of 2025, with masts cut down.
