= Strait of Magellan =

Strait in southern Chile between the Atlantic and Pacific

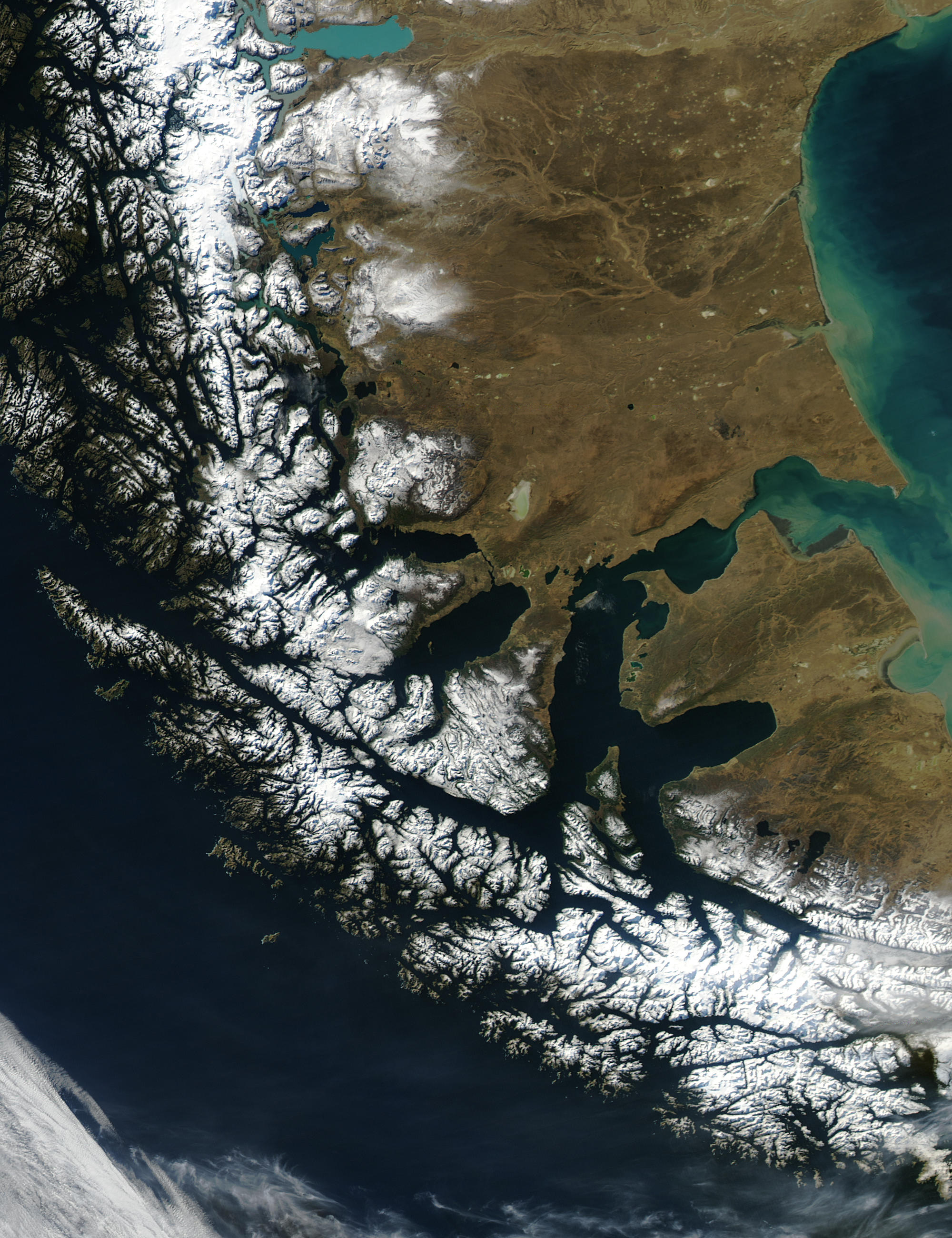
- The Strait of Magellan at the southern tip of South America

- Location within Chile
- Location: Magallanes Region, Chile
- Coordinates: 54°S 71°W
- Type: Strait
- Max. length: 570 km (350 mi)
- Min. width: 2 km (1.2 mi)

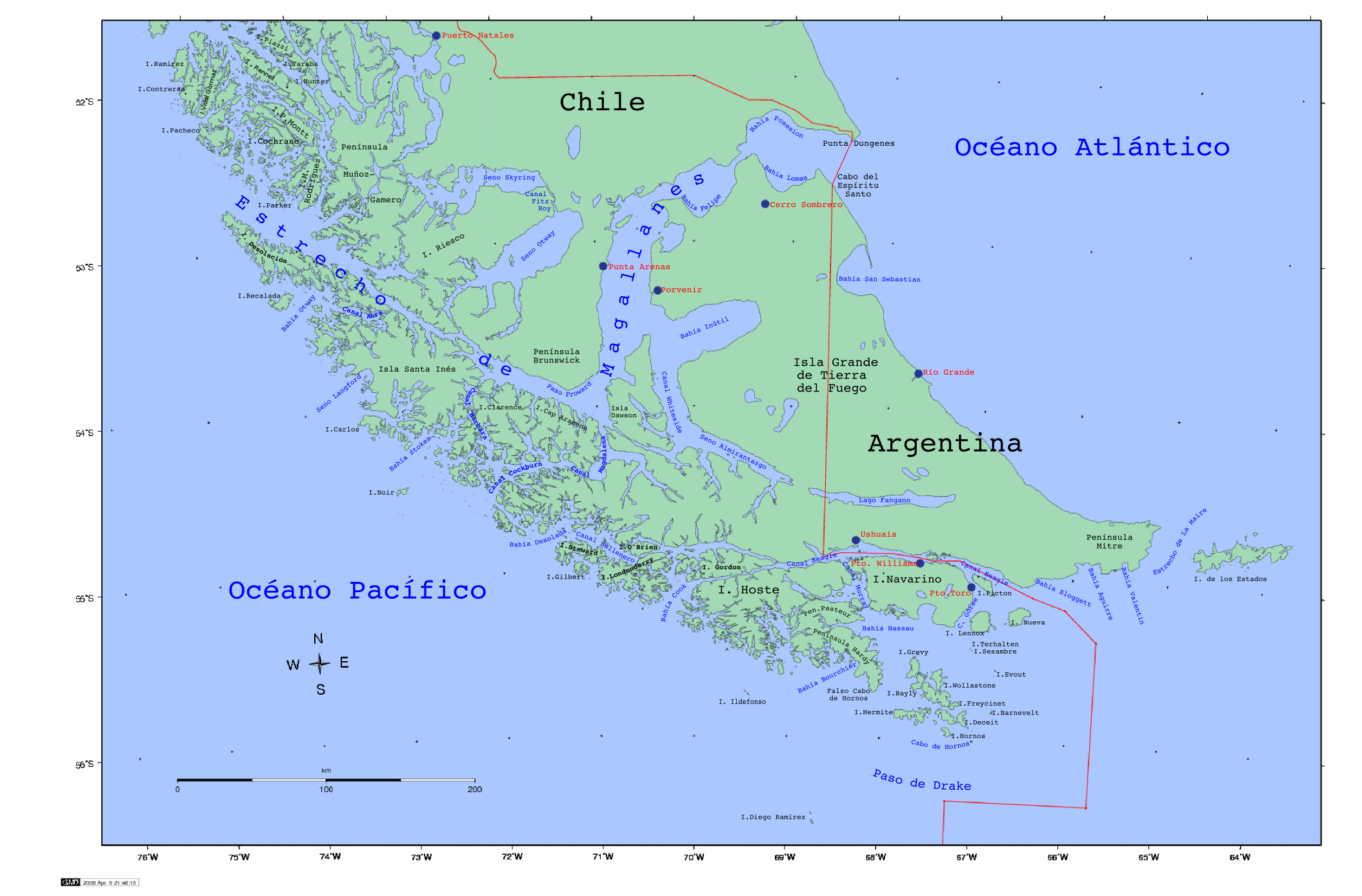
The Strait of Magellan

The Strait of Magellan (Spanish: Estrecho de Magallanes), also called the Straits of Magellan, is a navigable sea route in southern Chile separating mainland South America to the north and the Tierra del Fuego archipelago to the south. Considered the most important natural passage between the Atlantic and Pacific oceans, the strait is approximately 570 km (310 nmi; 350 mi) long and 2 km (1.1 nmi; 1.2 mi) wide at its narrowest point. The name of the strait dates to 1520, when the Spanish expedition of the Portuguese navigator Ferdinand Magellan brought the first Europeans to the area.

Magellan's original name for the strait was Estrecho de Todos los Santos ("Strait of All Saints"). The King of Spain, Emperor Charles V, who had sponsored the Magellan-Elcano expedition, changed the name to the Strait of Magellan in honor of Magellan.

The route is difficult to navigate due to frequent narrows and unpredictable winds and currents. Maritime piloting is now compulsory. The strait is shorter and more sheltered than the Drake Passage (the open sea route around Cape Horn), which is beset by frequent gale-force winds and icebergs. Along with the Beagle Channel, the strait was one of the few sea routes between the Atlantic and Pacific before the construction of the Panama Canal.

== History ==
=== Indigenous navigation ===
Land adjacent to the Strait of Magellan has been inhabited by indigenous Americans for at least 13,000 years. Upon their arrival in the region, they would have encountered native equines (Hippidion), the large ground sloth Mylodon, saber-toothed cats (Smilodon) the extinct jaguar subspecies Panthera onca mesembrina, the bear Arctotherium, the superficially camel-like Macrauchenia, the fox-like canid Dusicyon avus and lamine camelids, including the extant vicuña and guanaco. Evidence that Mylodon, Hippidion and the lamines were hunted has been found at some sites, such as Cueva del Medio.

Historically identifiable indigenous ethnic groups around the strait are the Kawésqar, the Tehuelche, the Selkʼnam and the Yaghan people. The Kawésqar lived on the western part of the strait's northern coast. To the east of the Kawésqar were the Tehuelche, whose territory extended to the north in Patagonia. To the south of the Tehuelche across the strait lived the Selkʼnam, who inhabited the majority of the eastern portion of Tierra del Fuego. To the west of the Selkʼnam were the Yaghan people, who inhabited the southernmost part of Tierra del Fuego.

All tribes in the area were nomadic hunter-gatherers. The Tehuelche were the only non-maritime culture in the area; they fished and gathered shellfish along the coast during the winter and moved into the southern Andes in the summer to hunt. The tribes of the region saw little European contact until the late 19th century. Later, European-introduced diseases decimated portions of the indigenous population.

It is possible that Tierra del Fuego was connected to the mainland in the Early Holocene (c. 9000 years BP) much in the same way that Riesco Island was back then. A Selkʼnam tradition recorded by the Salesian missionary Giuseppe María Beauvoir relates that the Selkʼnam arrived in Tierra del Fuego by land and that the Selkʼnam were later unable to return north as the sea had flooded their crossing. Selkʼnam migration to Tierra del Fuego is generally thought to have displaced a related non-seafaring people, the Haush that once occupied most of the main island. The Selkʼnam, Haush, and Tehuelche are generally thought to be culturally and linguistically related peoples physically distinct from the sea-faring peoples.

According to a Selkʼnam myth the strait was created along with the Beagle Channel and Fagnano Lake by slingshots falling on Earth during the fight of Taiyín with a witch who was said to have "retained the waters and the foods".

=== Magellan ===
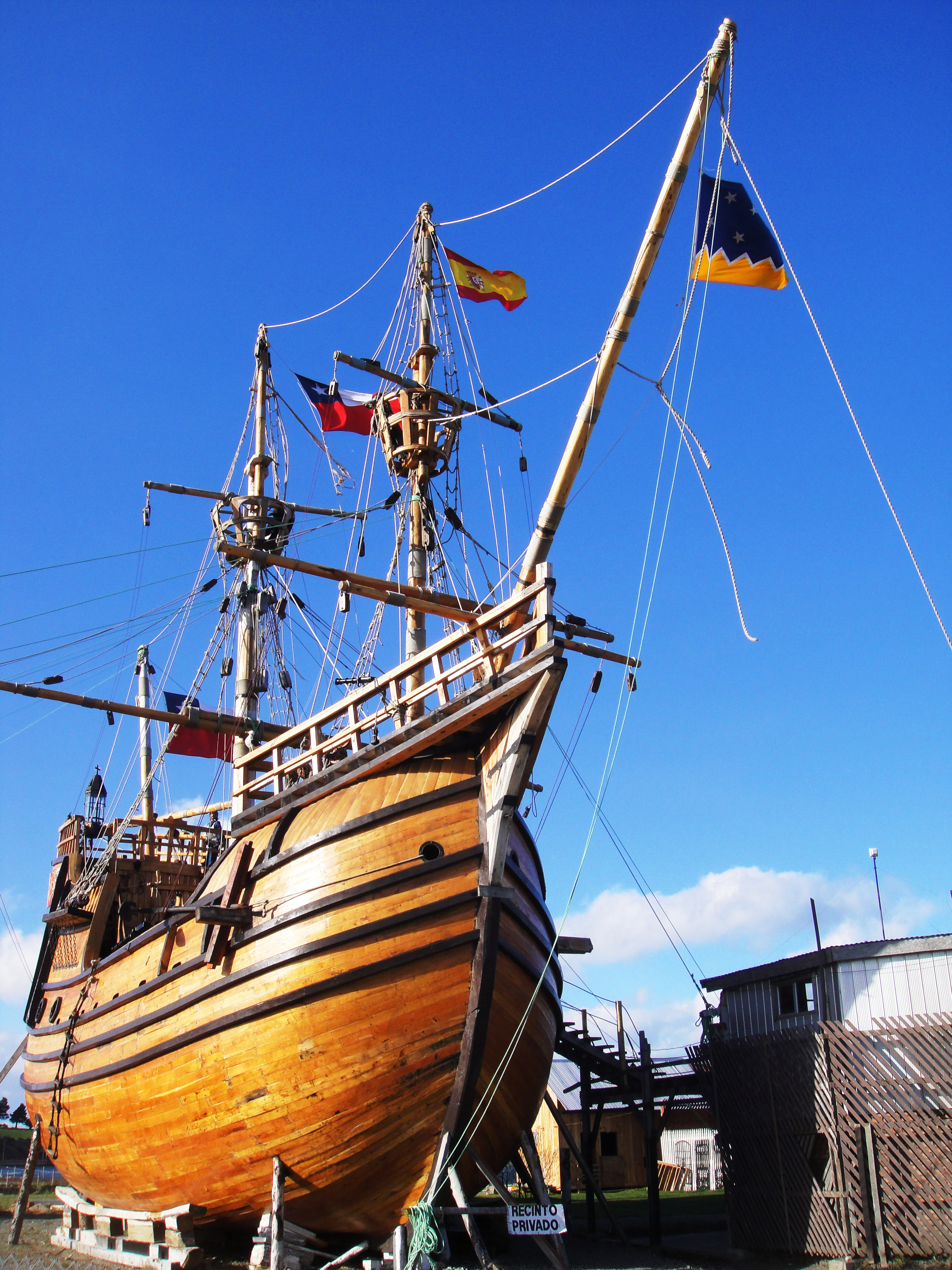
A replica of Victoria, one of Magellan's ships, in the Museo Nao Victoria, Punta Arenas, Chile

The first European contact in this area was the voyage of Ferdinand Magellan. A report by António Galvão in 1563 that mentions early charts showing the strait as "Dragon's Tail" has led to speculation that there might have been earlier contact, but this is generally discounted. (Note: See also: Pre-Columbian trans-oceanic contact theories, Exploration of North America, Waldseemüller map, Madoc, and Norse colonization of North America)

Magellan led an expedition in the service of the Spanish King, Emperor Charles V, to reach the Spice Islands. His ships became the first to navigate the strait in 1520. The five ships included La Trinidad (110 tons, 55 crew members), under the command of Magellan; La San Antonio (120 tons, 60 crew members) under the command of Juan de Cartagena; La Concepción (90 tons, 45 crew members) under the command of Gaspar de Quesada (Juan Sebastián Elcano served as boatswain); La Victoria (85 tons, 42 crew members) under the command of Luis de Mendoza; and La Santiago (75 tons, 32 crew members), under command of Juan Rodríguez Serrano (João Rodrigues Serrão). Before the passage of the strait (and after the mutiny in Puerto San Julián), Álvaro de Mesquita became captain of the San Antonio, and Duarte Barbosa of the Victoria. Later, Serrão became captain of the Concepcion (the Santiago, sent on a mission to find the passage, was caught in a storm and wrecked). San Antonio charged to explore Magdalen Sound, failed to return to the fleet, instead sailing back to Spain under Estêvão Gomes, who imprisoned the captain Mesquita.

Magellan's ships entered the strait on All Saints' Day, 1 November 1520. Magellan named the Strait Estrecho de Todos los Santos ("Strait of All Saints") and planted a flag to claim the land on behalf of the King of Spain. Magellan's chronicler, Antonio Pigafetta, called it the Patagonian Strait, and others Victoria Strait, commemorating the first ship that entered. Within seven years, it was being called Estrecho de Magallanes in honor of Magellan. The Spanish Empire and the Captaincy General of Chile considered the strait the southern boundary of their territory.

=== 16th century explorations after Magellan ===
View of the capitulaciones granted by Charles V, Holy Roman Emperor in 1534

In the 1530s Charles V divided South America and whatever was to be south of it into a series of grants to different conquistadors. The Strait of Magellan and the area south of it went to Pedro Sánchez de la Hoz. (Note: Later this has served Chilean and Argentine governments to claim Terra Australis, and Tierra del Fuego and by extension the continent of Antarctica was in effect claimed by Spain and that an animus occupandi existed on the part of Spain in the lands south of the strait. Spain's sovereignty claim over this territory was internationally recognized with the Inter caetera bull of 1493 and the Treaty of Tordesillas of 1494.)

In 1530 and 1531 the Fuggers held rights to trade through the Strait of Magellan. While European trade with Asia through this route was thought to be possible, the Fuggers never developed this route.

Andrés de Urdaneta, who had first-hand experience of the strait by his participation in the Loaísa expedition, argued before viceroy Antonio de Mendoza in the 1550s for the establishment of an Asia–Mexico trade route and presented arguments against the establishment of a rival route of direct trade between Spain and Asia through the Strait of Magellan. According to Urdaneta, the climate would make passage through the strait possible only during summer and therefore ships would need to stay the winter in a more northern port. Urdaneta's preference for Mexico may have also been influenced by his links to Pedro de Alvarado. Following Urdaneta's plans in 1565, the first Manila galleon inaugurated European trade with Asia across the Pacific.

Pedro de Valdivia, the conquistador of Chile, managed to have Charles V extend his governorship to the northern shores of the strait. Meanwhile, Sánchez de la Hoz was executed in Chile by Francisco de Villagra, one of Valdivia's men.

The first map of the Pacific Ocean, Maris Pacifici from 1589, depicts the strait as the only route between the Atlantic and Pacific oceans.

==== The strait and the conquest of Chile ====
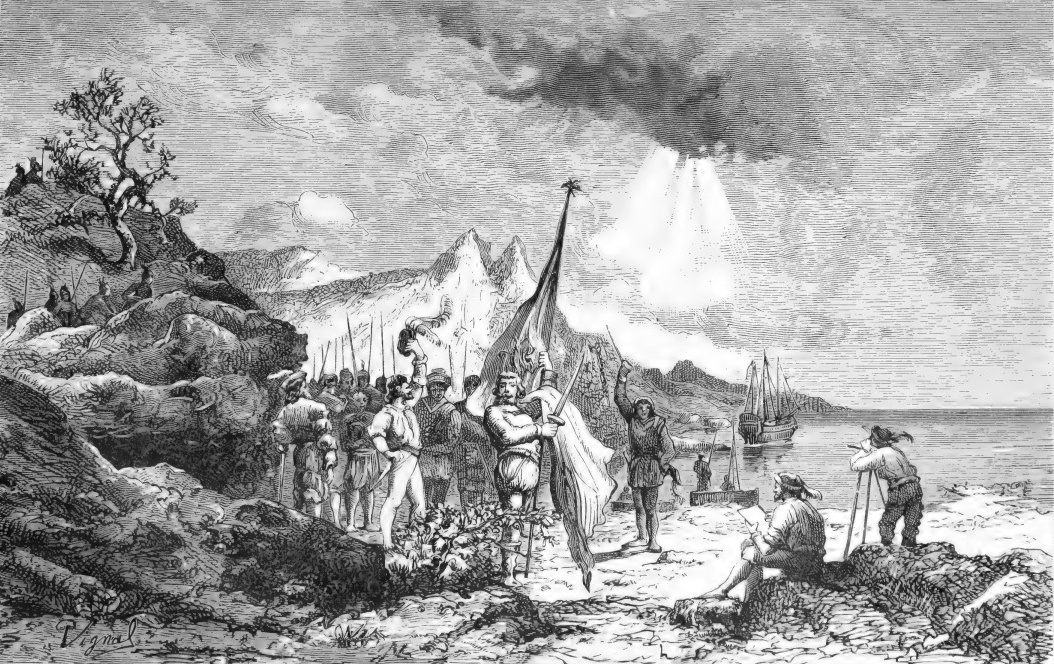
Juan Ladrillero took possession of the Strait of Magellan for the Governorate of Chile and the King of Spain in 1558.

Contemporaries differed in their estimation of the strait's significance. In Europe, it was viewed by some as an opportunity and a strategic location to facilitate long-range trade, though Antonio Pigafetta seemed to have understood his voyage through the area as an unrepeatable feat. By contrast, conquistador Pedro de Valdivia, in a letter to Charles V, considered the strait a threat through which rival conquistadors could arrive to challenge his claims.

In 1544 Valdivia commissioned Captain Juan Bautista Pastene to explore the coast from Valparaíso to the Strait of Magellan, and installed his secretary Juan de Cárdenas in the expedition to produce a written account of the lands discovered to solidify his claims before the King. Although Pastene's expedition reached only the 41st parallel south, well short of the strait, it discovered San Pedro Bay and the mouth of Valdivia River, where Valdivia would later find the city that bears his name. As Valdivia consolidated his claims, he mentioned in a 1548 letter to the Council of the Indies the possibility of establishing contacts between Chile and Seville through the strait.

García Jofré de Loaiza was the second captain to navigate the strait and the first to discover that Tierra del Fuego was an island. Valdivia then dispatched Francisco de Ulloa to survey and explore the strait, facilitating navigation from Spain to Chile. In October 1553, Ulloa sailed from the city of Valdivia in the first expedition to enter the strait from the west. Ulloa reached Woods Bay, but faced with the steep coastline and lack of provisions and fearing entrapment in the strait during the winter, he turned around, returning to Chilean ports in February 1554.

Valdivia himself never actually reached the strait, as he was killed in 1553 attempting to conquer Araucanía, about 1600 km (994 miles) north of the strait.

In October 1557, Governor García Hurtado de Mendoza sent another exploratory squad of 70 men under the command of Juan Ladrillero. They were charged with mapping the coastline and surveying the region's flora, fauna, and ethnography. On August 16, 1558, Ladrillero arrived in the Atlantic Ocean, becoming the first navigator to cross the Strait of Magellan in both directions.

Colonization by the Spanish southward in Chile halted after the conquest of the Chiloé Archipelago in 1567. The Spanish are thought to have lacked incentives for further conquests south. The indigenous populations were sparse and did not engage in the sedentary agricultural life of the Spanish. The harsh climate in the fjords and channels of Patagonia may also have deterred further expansion. Even in Chiloé the Spanish encountered difficulties, having to abandon their initial economic model based on gold mining and "hispanic-mediterranean" agriculture.

==== Spanish attempt to colonise the strait ====
In 1578 English navigator Francis Drake crossed the strait, creating fear on the Pacific coast that an attack was imminent. To seal the passage, the Viceroy of Peru, Francisco de Toledo, sent a squadron with two ships under Pedro Sarmiento de Gamboa. They carefully explored the strait, trying to ferret out English invaders, while surveying locations for future fortifications.

Pigafetta had described the strait as a hospitable area with many good ports, "cedar" wood, and abundant shellfish and fish.

In 1584, Sarmiento de Gamboa founded two colonies in the strait: Nombre de Jesús and Ciudad del Rey Don Felipe. The latter was established on the north shore of the strait with 300 settlers. That winter, it became known as Puerto del Hambre, or "Port Famine", as most of the settlers died of cold or starvation. When Sir Thomas Cavendish landed at the site of Rey Don Felipe in 1587, he found only ruins of the settlement.

The Spanish failure to colonize the Strait of Magellan made the Chiloé Archipelago key in protecting western Patagonia from foreign intrusions. Valdivia, reestablished in 1645, and Chiloé acted as sentries, and hubs where the Spanish collected intelligence from all over Patagonia.

In 1599 it took five ships under Simon de Cordes and his pilot William Adams four months to traverse the strait; Sebalt de Weert returned before reaching the end.

=== 17th century explorations ===
In 1616, Dutch travelers, including Willem Schouten and Jacob Le Maire, discovered Cape Horn and recognized the southern end of Tierra del Fuego. Years later, a Spanish expedition commanded by brothers Bartolomé and Gonzalo Nodal verified this discovery making in the way also the first circumnavigation of Tierra del Fuego. After this, there would be 150 years before the next ship from Spain would traverse the strait. By 1620, one hundred years after European discovery, at least 55 ships had traversed the strait including 23 Spanish, 17 English and 15 Dutch.

John Narborough's 1670 explorations in Patagonia caused the Spanish to launch various maritime expeditions to western Patagonia from 1674 to 1676. In the last and largest one, Pascual de Iriate led a party to Evangelistas Islets at the western entrance to the strait. At Evangelistas sixteen men of the party disappeared on February 17 including the son of Pascual de Iriarte. The ill-fated men had attempted to reach one of the islets to install a metal plaque indicating the King of Spain's ownership of the territory. Viceroy of Peru Baltasar de la Cueva issued orders to the governments of Chile, Chiloé and Río de la Plata to inquire about the men who disappeared at Evangelistas Islets. However, no information about their fate came forth and it is presumed that the boat wrecked in the same storm that forced the remaining party to leave the area. Overall a total of 16–17 men perished in it. While by 1676 rumours about English bases in Western Patagonia had been dispelled, that year new rumours appeared claiming that England was preparing an expedition to settle the Straits of Magellan. The focus of Spanish attention to repel tentative English settlements shifted from the Pacific coast of Patagonia to the Straits of Magellan and Tierra del Fuego. Such a change, from the western archipelagoes to the strait, meant that any English settlement could be approached by Spain by land from the north, which was not the case for the islands in western Patagonia.

In February 1696, the first French expedition under the command of M. de Gennes reached the Strait of Magellan. The expedition is described by the French explorer, engineer, and hydrographer François Froger in his A Relation of a Voyage (1699).

=== 18th century explorations ===
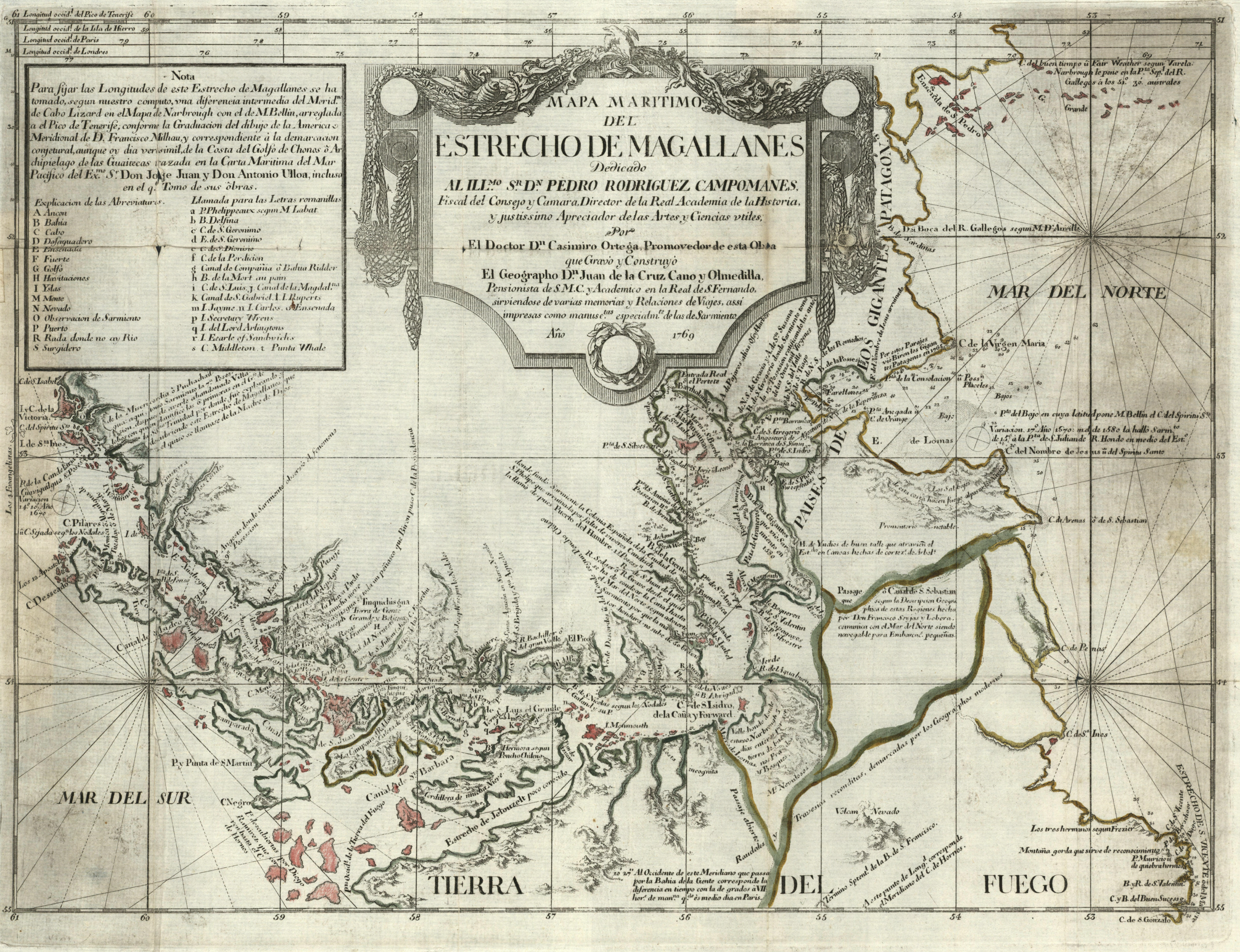
Map of the Strait made by Juan de la Cruz Cano y Olmedilla, 1769.

In the 18th century, further explorations were done by English explorers John Byron and James Cook. The French sent Louis Antoine de Bougainville and Jules Dumont d'Urville. By 1770 the focus of a potential conflict between Spain and Britain had shifted from the strait to the Falkland Islands.

=== 19th century ===
==== Explorations ====
From 1826 to 1830, the strait was explored and thoroughly charted by Phillip Parker King, who commanded the British survey vessel HMS Adventure. In consort with HMS Beagle, King surveyed the complex coasts around the strait. A report on the survey was presented at two meetings of the Geographical Society of London in 1831. In connection with these explorations, Robert FitzRoy came to suggest the establishment of a British base in the strait to aid travel between the British Isles and Australia.

The 1837 French expedition of Dumont D'Urville surveyed the area of Puerto del Hambre and the navigational conditions in the Strait of Magellan. In a report, the expedition recommended that a French colony be established at the strait to support future traffic along the route.

Richard Charles Mayne commanded HMS Nassau on a survey expedition to the strait from 1866 to 1869. The naturalist on the voyage was Robert Oliver Cunningham. Charles Darwin requested the Lords of the Admiralty to ask Mayne to collect several boatloads of fossils of extinct quadruped species. Admiral Sulivan had previously discovered an astonishingly rich accumulation of fossil bones not far from the strait. These remains belonged to a more ancient period than collections made by Darwin on HMS Beagle and other naturalists, and therefore were of great scientific interest. Many of these fossils were collected with the aid of hydrographer Richards R. N. and deposited in the British Museum. The Admiralty compiled advice to mariners of the strait in 1871.

==== Takeover during Republican Chile ====
Chile took possession of the Strait of Magellan on May 23, 1843. President Manuel Bulnes ordered this expedition after consulting the Chilean libertador Bernardo O'Higgins, who feared an occupation by Great Britain or France. The first Chilean settlement, Fuerte Bulnes, was situated in a forested zone on the north side of the strait and was later abandoned. In 1848, Punta Arenas was founded farther north, where the Magellanic forests meet the Patagonian plains. In Tierra del Fuego, across the strait from Punta Arenas, the village of Porvenir emerged during the Tierra del Fuego gold rush in the late 19th century. Until the opening of the Panama Canal, the town was an important supply stop for mariners. It has been claimed that Chile's annexation of the area originated from a fear of occupation by Great Britain or France.

In the Boundary Treaty of 1881 between Chile and Argentina, Argentina effectively recognized Chilean sovereignty over the Strait of Magellan. Argentina had previously claimed all of the straits, or at least the eastern third of it.

In the Treaty of Peace and Friendship of 1984 between Chile and Argentina the conflicts between two countries were settled and Argentina ratified the strait as Chilean.

==== Steamship navigation ====
In 1840, the Pacific Steam Navigation Company became the first to use steamships for commercial traffic in the strait. Until the Panama Canal opened in 1914, the Strait of Magellan was the main route for steamships traveling from the Atlantic Ocean to the Pacific. It was often considered safer than the Drake Passage separating Cape Horn from Antarctica, as the Drake Passage is notorious for turbulent and unpredictable weather, and is frequented by icebergs and sea ice. Ships in the strait, protected by Tierra del Fuego to the south and the coast of continental South America to the north, crossed with relative ease, and Punta Arenas became a primary refueling port that provided coal for steamships in transit. The Strait's curving channel, with widths varying between 1.9 and 22 miles (3 to 35 km), experiences unpredictable winds and tidal currents, leading sailing ships to prefer the Drake Passage, where they had more room to maneuver.)

=== 20th century to present ===
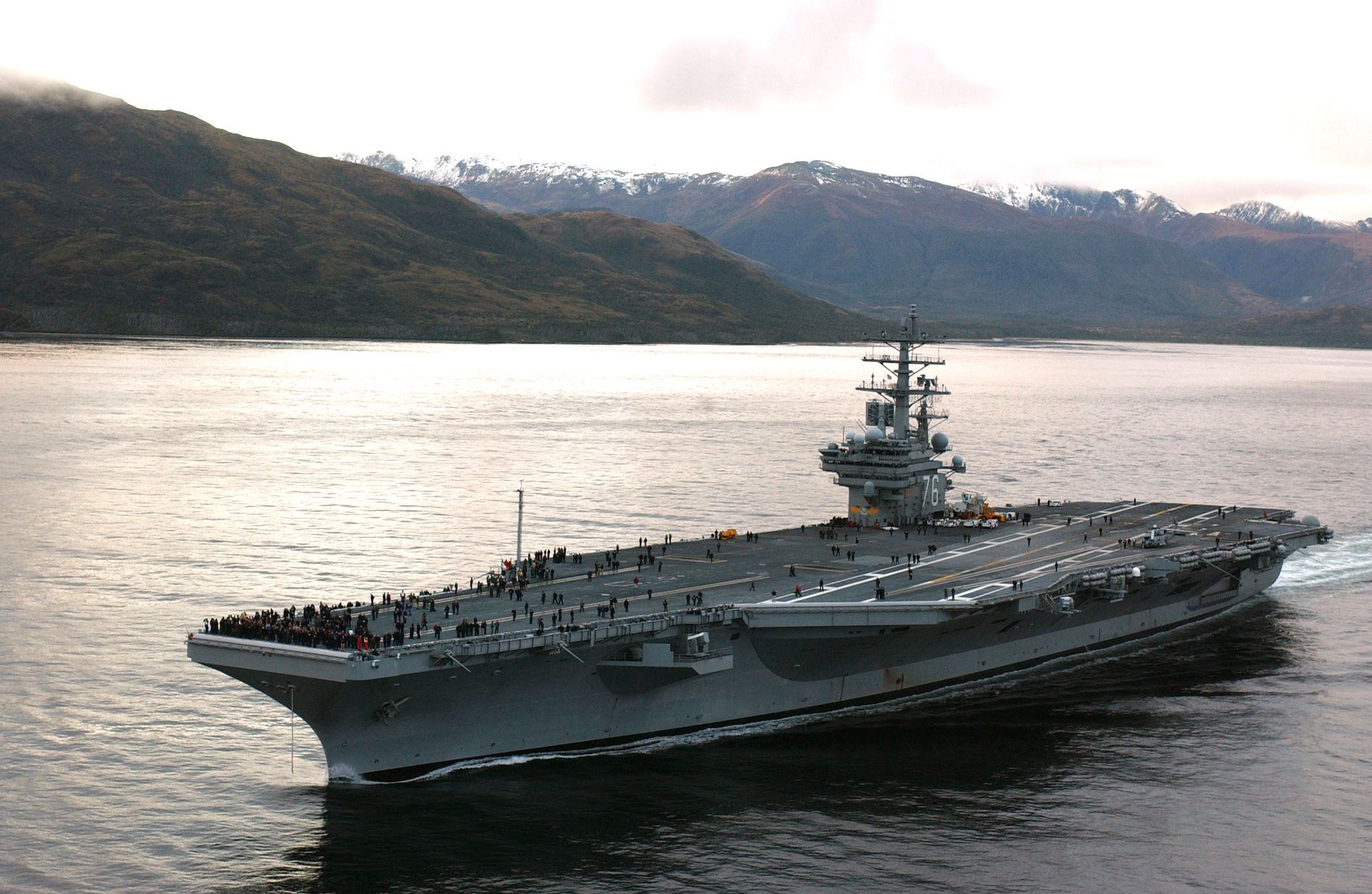
USS Ronald Reagan passing through the Strait of Magellan in 2004

In 1900, Joshua Slocum was the first documented person to have single-handedly sailed the strait. He experienced a 40-day hiatus in the strait due to storms and adverse weather, (Note: In Port Angosto, Strait of Magellan, the Spray was re-rigged as a yawl by adding a jigger. Slocum 2006, p. 127: "I also mended the sloop's sails and rigging, and fitted a jigger, which changed the rig to a yawl [...]") while piloting the gaff-rigged sloop oyster boat Spray in the first solo global circumnavigation. He wrote about his experience in Sailing Alone Around the World.

In 1976, American open water swimmer Lynne Cox became the first person to swim across the strait. Almost 40 years later, on January 17, 2014, Hunter Wright became the youngest person to swim across the strait, at age 17.

In June 2004, the USS Ronald Reagan was the first nuclear-powered aircraft carrier to navigate the strait.

== Features ==
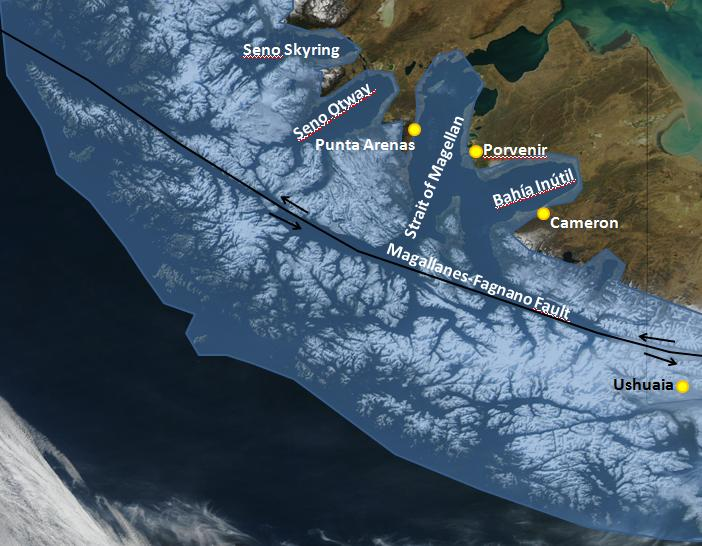
Map showing the extent of the Patagonian Ice Sheet in the Strait of Magellan area during the Last Glacial Period. Selected modern settlements are shown with yellow dots.

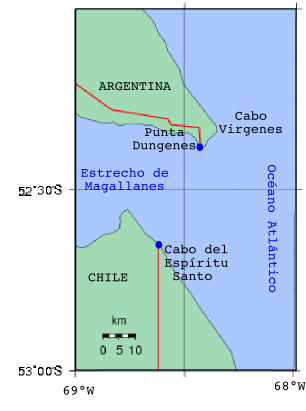
East mouth of the strait, Punta Dungenes on the north and Cabo del Espíritu Santo in the south mark the strait border.

The strait is approximately 570 km (310 nmi; 350 mi) long and 2 km (1.1 nmi; 1.2 mi) wide at its narrowest point (Carlos III Island, west of Cape Froward). The northwestern portion of the strait is connected with other sheltered waterways via the Smyth Channel. This area is similar to the Inside Passage of Alaska. South of Cape Froward, the principal shipping route follows the Magdalena Channel. The climate is generally foggy and cold, and the course is convoluted with several narrow passages. It is several hundred miles shorter than the Drake Passage, but sailing ships, particularly clipper ships, prefer the latter. Its major port is Punta Arenas, a transshipment point for Chilean mutton situated on the Brunswick Peninsula. Exemplifying the difficulty of the passage, it took Magellan 38 days to complete the crossing.

The eastern opening is a wide bay on Punta Dúngeness on the mainland and Cabo del Espíritu Santo ("Cape of the Holy Spirit") on Tierra del Fuego, the border as defined in the Treaty of Peace and Friendship of 1984 between Chile and Argentina. Immediately west are Primera Angostura and Segunda Angostura, narrows formed by two terminal moraines of different ages. The Primera Angostura is the closest approach of Isla Grande de Tierra del Fuego to mainland South America. Farther west lies Magdalena Island, part of Los Pingüinos Natural Monument. The strait's southern boundary in the east follows first the shoreline of the Isla Grande de Tierra del Fuego, then the northern end of the Canal Whiteside and the shoreline of Dawson Island.

The western part of the strait leads northwest from the northern end of the Magdalena Channel to the strait's Pacific entrance. This is flanked on the south by Capitán Aracena Island, Clarence Island, Santa Inés Island, Desolación Island (Cabo Pilar), and other smaller islands, and on the north by Brunswick Peninsula, Riesco Island, Muñoz Gamero Peninsula, Manuel Rodriguez Island, and other minor islands of the Queen Adelaide Archipelago. Two narrow channels connect the strait with Seno Otway and Seno Skyring. A broader channel, Smyth Channel, leads north from the strait between Muñoz Gamero Peninsula and Manuel Rodriguez Island. Francisco Coloane Marine and Coastal Protected Area, a sanctuary for humpback whales, is located in this area. This part of the strait lies on the elongated Magallanes-Fagnano Fault, which marks a plate boundary between the South American Plate and the Scotia Plate. This fault continues southward under Almirantazgo Fjord and then below Fagnano Lake. Possibly, new tourism industries could be established in the eastern part of the strait for watching southern right whales, as the number of observations in the area has increased in recent years.

In the more well-defined northeastern course of the strait, various bays stand out in its geography. Pecket Bay (Spanish: bahía Pecket) is a shallow and somewhat closed bay in the strait located near where Brunswick Peninsula is as narrowest. San Gregorio Bay (Spanish: bahía San Gregorio) is an open bay located on the north coast of the strait. Opposite Pecket Bay is Gente Grande Bay (Spanish: bahía Gente Grande) in Tierra del Fuego.

== Tides and weather ==
On the Atlantic side, the strait is characterized by semidiurnal macrotides with mean and spring tide ranges of 7.1 and 9.0 m, respectively. On the Pacific side, tides are mixed and mainly semidiurnal, with mean and spring tide ranges of 1.1 and 1.2 m, respectively. There is enormous tidal energy potential in the strait. The strait is prone to Williwaws, "a sudden violent, cold, katabatic gust of wind descending from a mountainous coast of high latitudes to the sea". (Note: The Aleutian Islands exhibit the same phenomenon.)

== Place names ==
The place names of the area around the strait come from a variety of languages. Many are from Spanish and English, and several are from the Selkʼnam language, adapted to Spanish phonology and spelling. Examples include Timaukel (a hamlet on the east side of Tierra del Fuego), Carukinka (the end of the Almirantazgo Fjord), Anika (a channel located at 54° 7' S and 70° 30' W), and Arska (the north side of the Dawson Island).

Magellan named the strait Todos los Santos, as he began his voyage through the strait on November 1, 1520, the day of "All Saints" (Todos los Santos in Spanish). Charles V renamed it Estrecho de Magallanes. Magellan named the island on the south side of the strait Tierra del Fuego, which the Yaghan people called Onaisín in the Yaghan language. Magellan also gave the name Patagones to the mainland Indians, and their land was subsequently known as Patagonia.

Bahía Cordes is named after the Dutch pirate Baltazar de Cordes.

The Strait of Magellan Park, 52 km (32 mi) south of Punta Arenas, is a 250 ha (620-acre) protected area.

== Lighthouses in the strait ==
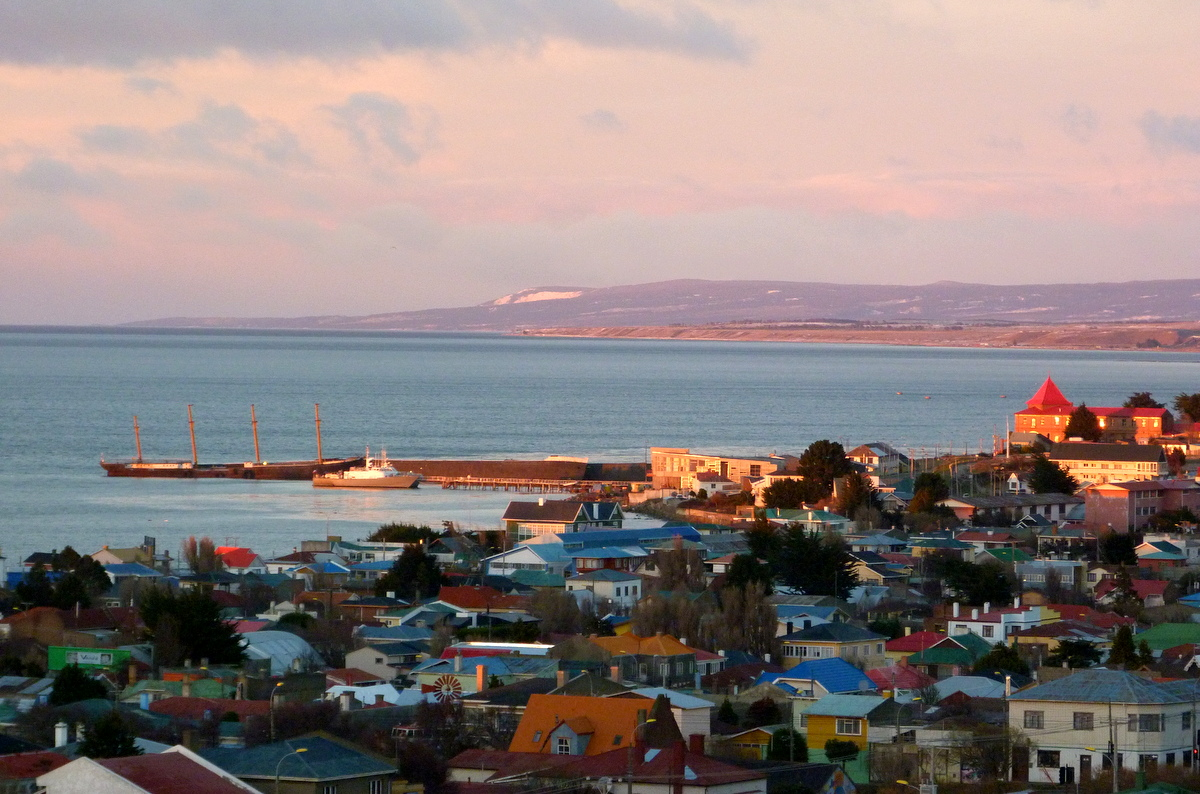
The County of Peebles and Cavenga are used as a breakwater for the harbour at Punta Arenas.

The National Geospatial-Intelligence Agency lists 41 lighthouses in the waterway. Some of them are more than a century old, and some are declared Monumento Nacional ("national monument"). Among the most notable lighthouses are: the County of Peebles hulk, the world's first four-masted, iron-hulled "full-rig ship", used now as a breakwater for the harbour at Punta Arenas; the San Isidro lighthouse, restored in 2004 and is now a museum and lodge; and the Evangelistas Lighthouse, located at the western mouth of the strait and built by George Slight, who wrote on his arrival in 1934:

I never imagined seeing something so wild and desolate as those emerging dark rocks in the middle of the raging waves. To see these stormy, craggy rocks was frightening. With a dim light on the horizon, we could see large waves crashing heavily in the western part of the islands: a vision that hardly anyone can imagine ...

This strait is one of the region's most popular tourist destinations. Several cruise companies ply its waters, and the lighthouses, including Magdalena Island Light, are popular attractions.

== Environment ==
Numerous protected systems are located around the strait (S.P.: Sistema Protegido; B.N.P: Bienes Nacionales Protegidos):

- B.N.P. Isla Carlos III
- B.N.P. Islote Rupert
- S.P. Cabo Espíritu Santo
- S.P. Cabo Froward
- S.P. Cabo Posesión
- S.P. Estepa Húmeda Kampenaiken Tres Chorrillos
- S.P. Isla Dawson
- S.P. Península Muñoz Gamero
- S.P. Reservas Biológicas de Río Cóndor
- S.P. San Gregorio
- S.P. San Juan
- S.P. Timaukel

Collisions with ships are a major threat to whales in the strait, and it has therefore been suggested that speed limits should be imposed in the area around Francisco Coloane Marine and Coastal Protected Area. Since monitoring began in 2013, most reported ship-whale collisions in the area have involved humpback whales.

== Traffic ==
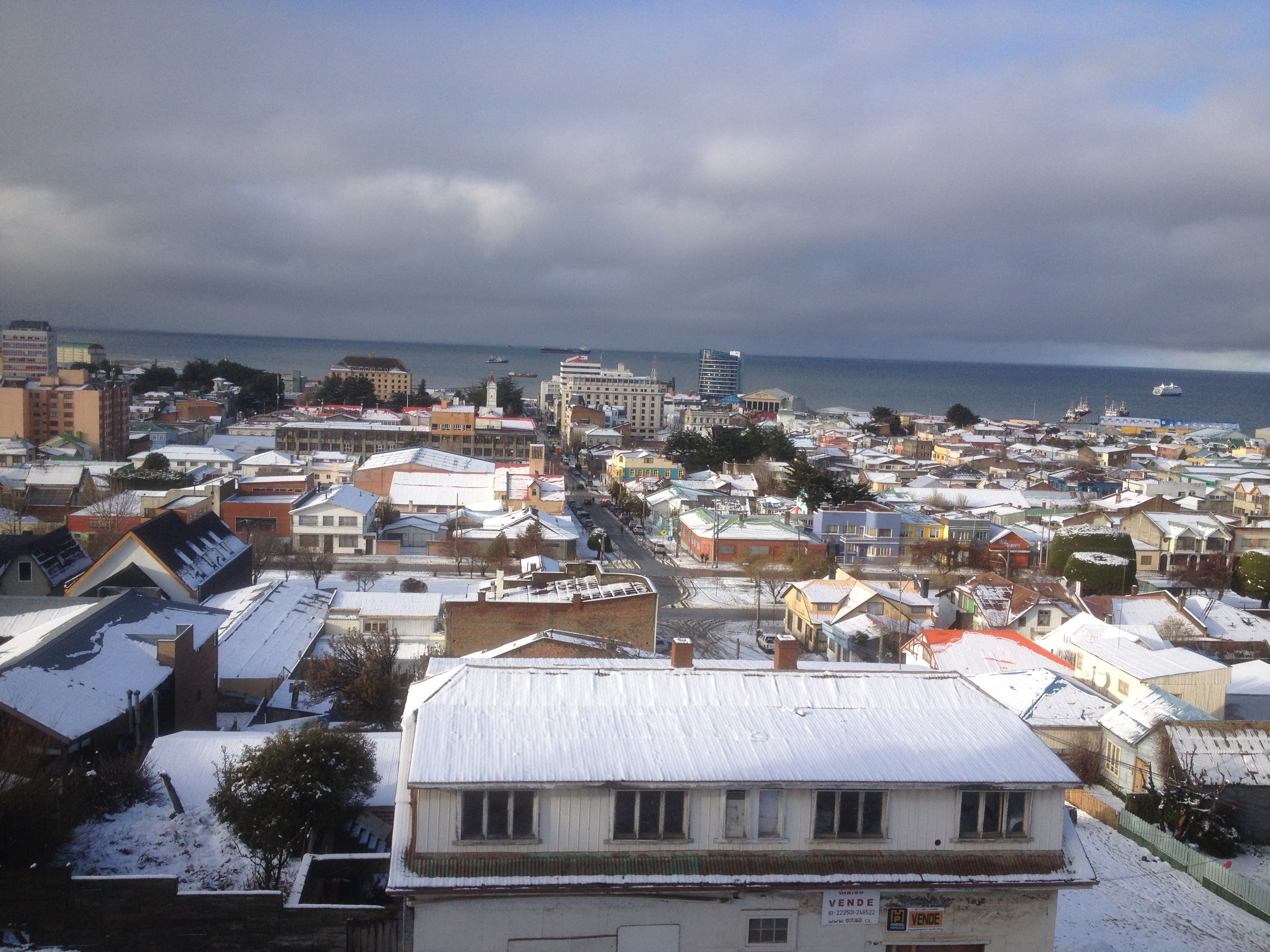
Port of Punta Arenas in winter

The strait provides a well-protected inland waterway sheltered from rough weather and high seas, allowing for safe navigation between the Atlantic and the Pacific, between other channels around Tierra del Fuego, and between various towns along these waterways.

In 2008, 571 Chilean ships and 1,681 non-Chilean ships sailed through the strait. Piloting is compulsory for sailing the strait. As one authority notes, "The Pilotage Regulations of the Chilean Hydrographic and Oceanographic Service ('the Regulations") provide that pilotage through the Magellan Strait is compulsory", with limited exceptions for local traffic. Who pays the fees for the pilot is subject to interpretation, however.

== Navigation status ==
Article 35 of the United Nations Convention on the Law of the Sea states that "Nothing in this Part affects: ... the legal regime in straits in which passage is regulated in whole or in part by long-standing international conventions in force specifically relating to such straits". Article V of the Boundary Treaty of 1881 between Chile and Argentina established a legal regime for the Strait of Magellan, and in a diplomatic letter to major shipping nations in 1873, Chile promised freedom of navigation through and neutrality within the strait.

== Gallery ==
Strait of Magellan

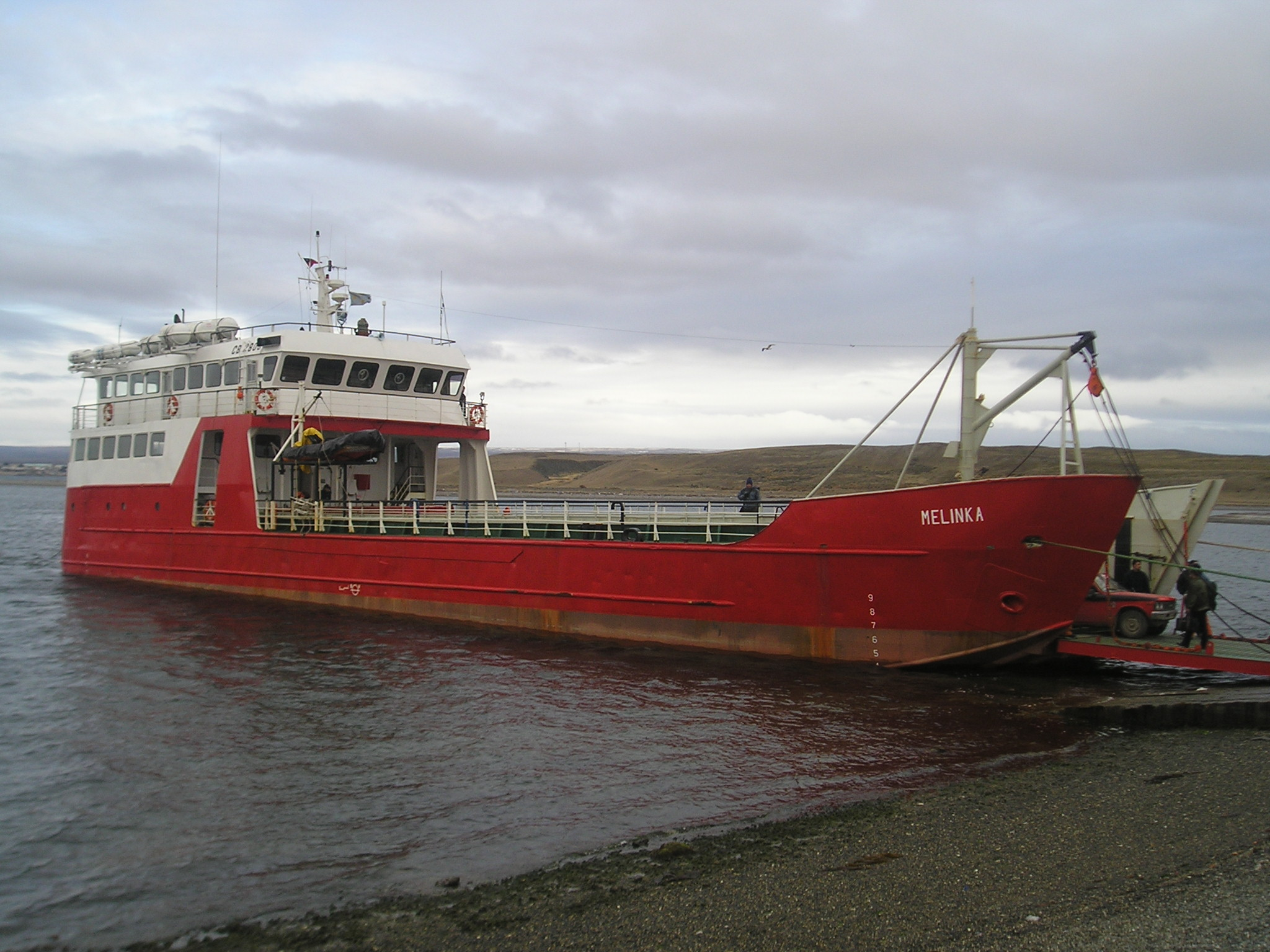
Barcaza Melinka at Porvenir port, providing a ferry service across the strait between Punta Arenas and Porvenir

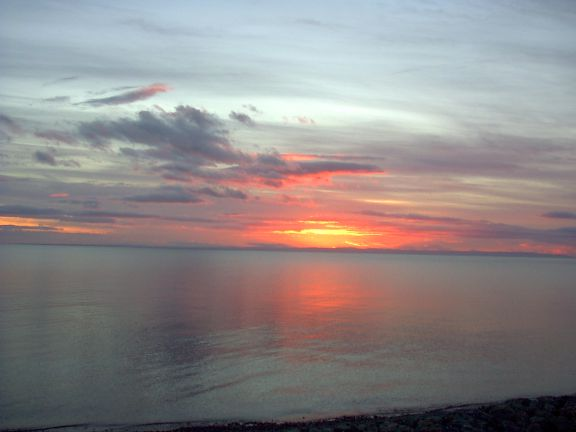
The Strait of Magellan at dawn

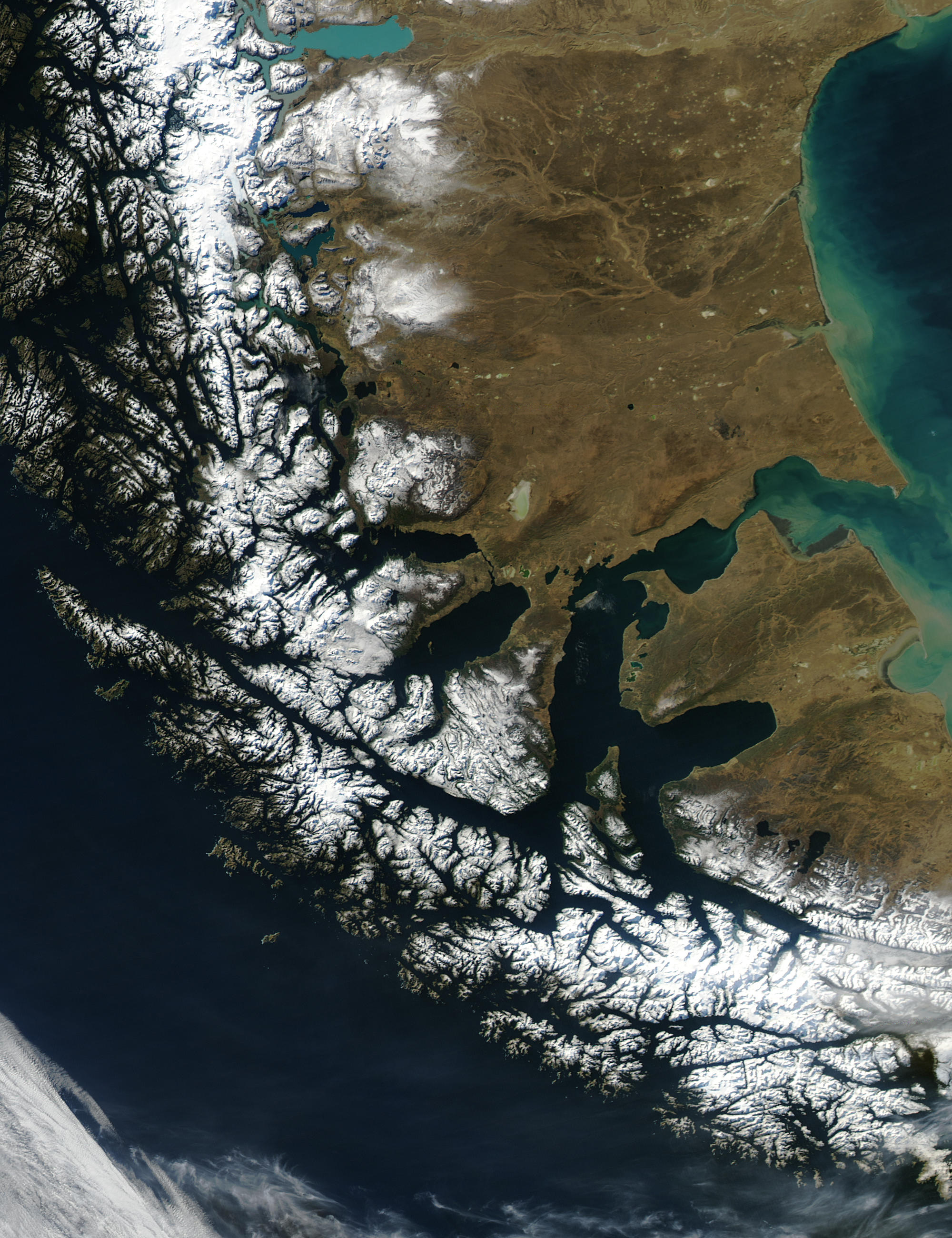
A true-color MODIS satellite image of the strait

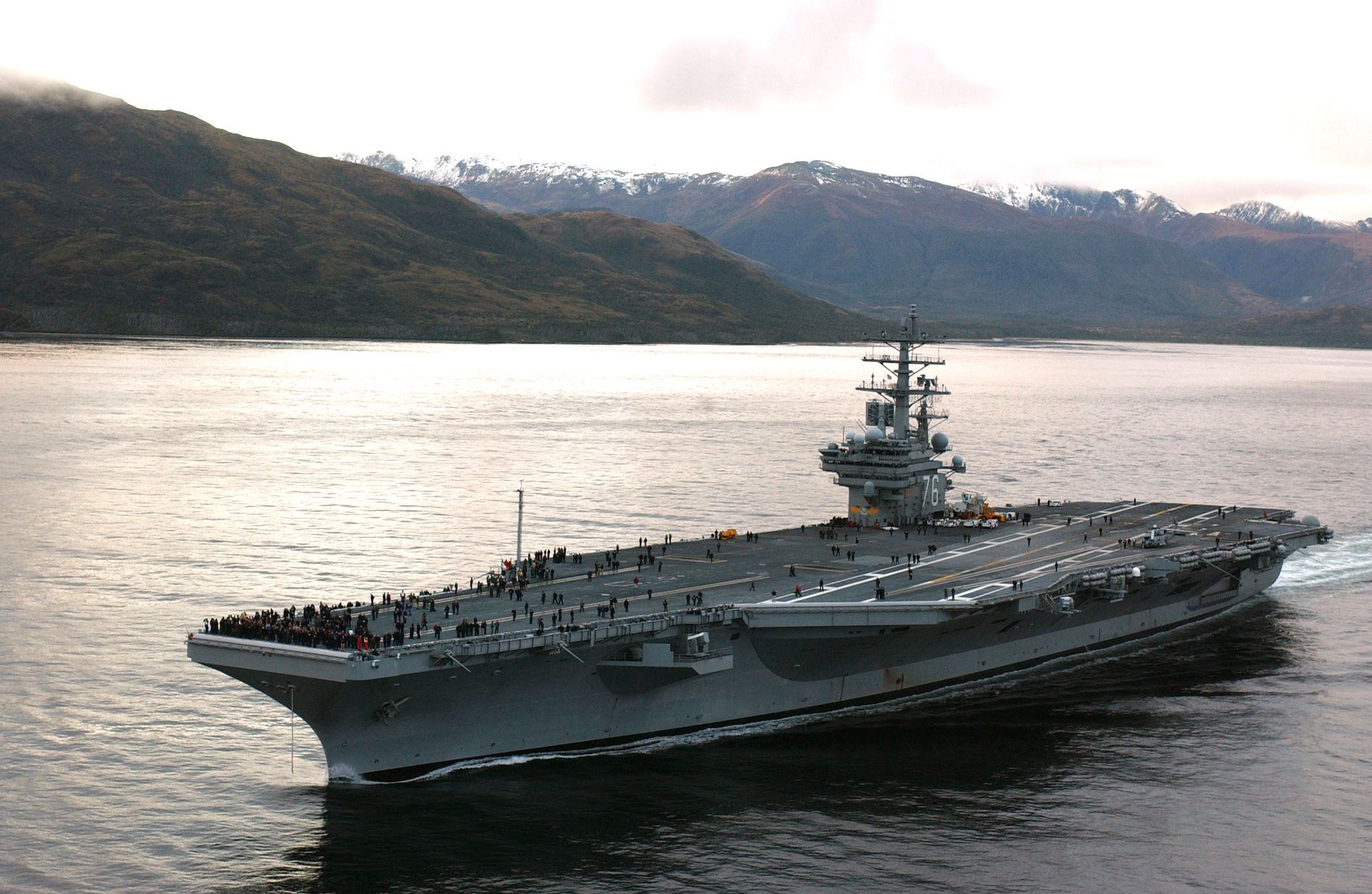
U.S. Navy carrier USS Ronald Reagan in the strait

== See also ==
- Agostini Fjord
- Archipelagoes of Patagonia
- Bahía Posesión
- Beaver eradication in Tierra del Fuego
- Cape Route
- Continental Divide of the Americas
- Exploration of the Pacific
- Fjords and channels of Chile
- Geography of Chile
- Islands of Chile
- List of Antarctic and subantarctic islands
- List of fjords, channels, sounds and straits of Chile
- List of islands of Chile
- List of things named after Ferdinand Magellan
- Magallanes Region
- Monte Sarmiento
- Punta Arenas
- Timeline of the Magellan–Elcano circumnavigation
- Transit passage
