= List of fjords, channels, sounds and straits of Chile =

The information regarding fjords, channels, sound and straits of Chile on this page is compiled from the data supplied by the National Geospatial-Intelligence Agency, Country Files (GNS).

== Content ==
This list contains only:

1. Listnr - List number (Wikipedia intern)
2. Full name - reversed generic. The full name is the complete name that identifies a named feature. The full name is output in reversed generic, "Desertores, Canal" as stored in the database, as opposed to the reading order, "Canal Desertores".
3. Latitude of the feature in ± decimal degrees
4. Longitude of the feature in ± decimal degrees
5. Unique Feature Identifier (UFI) is a number which uniquely identifies a Geoname feature. Same UFI means same feature.
6. FDC is the Feature Designation Code
7. Other names listed by NGA for the same feature

This list doesn't include Chilean claims in the Antarctica.

NGA lists 1447 names for 838 features with generics like "Fiordo", "Seno", "Canal", "Paso", "Bahía", "Brazo", "Estrecho", "Ensenada", "Estero". This compilation moved repeated UFIs to the last column of the first name given by NGA.

NGA gives following definition of the features in Feature Designation Code:

CHNM, marine channel, that part of a body of water deep enough for navigation through an area otherwise not suitable
CHNN, navigation channel, a buoyed channel of sufficient depth for the safe navigation of vessels
STRT, strait, a relatively narrow waterway, usually narrower and less extensive than a sound, connecting two larger bodies of water
FJD(S), fjord(s), a long, narrow, steep-walled, deep-water arm(s) of the sea at high latitudes, usually along mountainous coasts
SD, sound, a long arm of the sea forming a channel between the mainland and an island or islands; or connecting two larger bodies of water

Although some features are called "Bahía", the designation code "BAY" was not selected.

== More information ==
For more information about the feature search in GeoNames Search, using the Unique Feature Identifier (UFI) in the "Advanced Search" Form.

== Overview ==
Overview of Channels in South Chile: North to right and South to left side

== List of fjords, channels, sounds and straits of Chile ==
Channels and Passages of Chile
Listnr.	Name	Latitude	Longitude	UFI	FDC	other names
1	Choros, Paso	-29.259996	-71.498718	-877201	CHNM	
2	Grande, Boca	-36.6	-73.016667	128817	CHNM	
3	Chica, Boca	-36.616667	-73.066667	128784	CHNM	
4	Chica, Boca	-37.116667	-73.55	-876806	STRT	
5	Calbutué, Ensenada	-41.174337	-72.272638	-875961	FJD	Cayutué - Gallitúe
6	Tenglo, Canal	-41.513174	-72.996965	-902591	CHNM	
7	Maillén, Paso	-41.566357	-73.028421	-891288	CHNM	
8	Reloncaví, Seno	-41.65232	-72.851298	11280430	SD	
9	Reloncaví, Estero	-41.68484	-72.41185	-898982	FJD	
10	Guar, Paso	-41.71396	-73.024238	-883817	CHNM	
11	Tautil, Paso	-41.728362	-73.061122	-902503	CHNM	
12	Quigua, Canal	-41.73502	-73.222544	-898186	CHNM	Quihua, Canal
13	Huito, Estero	-41.754992	-73.14034	-884731	FJD	
14	Chacao, Canal de	-41.782928	-73.70776	-876255	CHNM	Chacao, Canal
15	San Antonio, Canal	-41.789966	-73.250383	-900140	CHNM	
16	Caicaén, Canal	-41.79161	-73.180323	-874553	CHNM	
17	Caulín, Canal	-41.800668	-73.626049	-875893	CHNM	
18	Calbuco, Canal	-41.805805	-73.134308	-874657	CHNM	
19	Quenu, Paso	-41.812826	-73.16816	-898093	CHNM	
20	Chidguapi, Canal	-41.813173	-73.113387	-876875	CHNM	Chidhuapi
21	Quihua, Paso	-41.818472	-73.179311	-898188	CHNM	Quigua
22	Abtao, Canal	-41.824065	-73.342833	-871156	CHNM	
23	Lagartija, Paso	-41.827021	-73.301808	-886324	CHNM	
24	Pilolcura, Paso	-41.843078	-73.122319	11284924	CHNM	
25	Lami, Paso	-41.85	-73.283333	-886900	CHNM	Lanu
26	Corvio, Paso	-41.867142	-73.207382	11284925	CHNM	
27	Queullín, Paso	-41.875852	-73.029032	-898156	CHNM	
28	Nao, Paso	-41.904663	-72.894345	-893306	CHNM	
29	Gualaihué, Estero	-41.970278	-72.649722	6145295	FJD	
30	Correntoso, Estero	-42.010833	-71.920833	6145404	FJD	
31	Pichicolo, Estero	-42.020485	-72.599706	-896124	FJD	Peti Codomouidamo, Estero - Pichicolu
32	Llanchid, Canal	-42.042838	-72.642186	-889286	CHNM	
33	Hornopirén, Canal	-42.050819	-72.524719	-884344	CHNM	
34	Andrade, Caleta	-42.080556	-72.548333	-872247	FJD	
35	Llancahué, Canal	-42.099626	-72.624129	-889274	CHNM	
36	Cholgo, Canal	-42.108056	-72.465	6145302	FJD	
37	Marilmó, Canal	-42.133889	-72.573333	-891827	CHNM	
38	Cholgo, Canal	-42.159683	-72.471232	-877156	CHNM	
39	Quintupeu, Estero	-42.168843	-72.401587	241987	FJD	
40	Caucahué, Canal	-42.176484	-73.40953	-875887	CHNM	Canal Caucahuel
41	Comau, Canal	-42.177208	-72.600716	-878108	CHNM	Canal Camau
42	Colú, Estero	-42.248104	-73.388595	-878079	FJD	
43	Cahuelmó, Estero	-42.248611	-72.427222	-874544	FJD	
44	Huequi, Estero	-42.252325	-72.739425	-884575	FJD	
45	Cheniao, Canal	-42.278279	-73.270472	-876767	CHNM	
46	Chauques, Canal	-42.315106	-73.168837	-876705	CHNM	
47	Quicaví, Canal	-42.315554	-73.333719	-898168	CHNM	
48	Taucolón, Paso	-42.319594	-73.224866	-902498	CHNM	
49	Añihué, Canal	-42.320034	-73.272807	-872326	CHNM	
50	Soledad, Estero	-42.330294	-72.554225	6145306	FJD	
51	Comau, Fiordo	-42.349204	-72.470555	-878109	FJD	Bordedahué, Comai, Comao, Estuario, Estero - Leptecu, Fiordo - Estero Leptepu - Leptepu, Fiordo - Leteu, Estero de
52	Tac, Canal	-42.355487	-73.133321	-902217	CHNM	
53	Tenaún, Paso	-42.359422	-73.470253	-902580	CHNM	
54	Quinchao, Canal	-42.467258	-73.433925	-898432	CHNM	
55	Dalcahue, Canal	-42.480261	-73.648047	-879353	CHNM	
56	Castro, Estero	-42.495258	-73.756322	-875800	FJD	Castro, Fiordo
57	Reñihué, Estero	-42.534223	-72.615783	6145280	FJD	
58	Lemui, Canal de	-42.581044	-73.720587	-888839	CHNM	Canal Lemuy
59	Pellín, Estero	-42.604259	-73.216575	-895652	FJD	Pellú, Estero
60	Chaulinec, Canal	-42.613233	-73.339762	-876698	CHNM	
61	Alao, Canal	-42.613343	-73.252217	-871610	CHNM	
62	Imelev, Paso	-42.629389	-73.385435	-884880	CHNM	
63	Quehui, Canal	-42.658992	-73.523731	6145472	CHNM	
64	Apiao, Canal	-42.681582	-73.172018	-872427	CHNM	
65	Yal, Canal de	-42.727676	-73.54533	-904897	CHNM	
66	Talcán, Estero	-42.767235	-72.952135	-902305	FJD	
67	Desertores, Canal	-42.813924	-72.886765	-879524	CHNM	
68	Pailad, Estero	-42.849637	-73.60415	-894624	FJD	Paildad, Estero
69	Compu, Estero	-42.869373	-73.670779	-878133	FJD	Compu, Fiordo
70	Queilén, Canal	-42.901577	-73.609858	-898012	CHNM	
71	Guailad, Estero	-43.044679	-73.573697	-884648	FJD	Guilat, Estero - Estero Huildad - Huildad, Fiordo
72	Almagrande, Ensenada	-43.049358	-72.755382	-894885	FJD	Alman Grande, Estero - Palbitad, Estero - Estero Palvitad - Palvitad, Fiordo
73	Yaldad, Estero	-43.133333	-73.733333	-904904	FJD	
74	Chiguao, Canal	-43.138357	-73.600856	-876898	CHNM	
75	Yelcho, Canal	-43.207321	-73.590288	-904963	CHNM	
76	Coldita, Canal	-43.264585	-73.670494	-877765	CHNM	
77	Laitec, Canal	-43.281843	-73.622797	-886664	CHNM	
78	Guamblad, Estero	-43.308611	-73.809444	-883677	FJD	Huamlad, Estero
79	San Pedro, Canal	-43.315906	-73.803746	-900716	CHNM	
80	Grupiquilan, Canal	-43.340398	-74.289214	-898216	CHNM	Guapiquilan, Canal de - Canal Quilán
81	Guamblad, Canal	-43.404607	-73.771365	-883676	CHNM	Guamlad, Guamlao, Huamblad, Huamlad
82	Surgidero, Canal	-43.424429	-74.249468	-902141	CHNM	
83	Grande, Canal	-43.433333	-74.216667	-883343	CHNM	
84	Boca del Guafo	-43.596111	-74.213056	-883558	SD	Guafo, Golfo de
85	Pillán, Brazo	-43.708124	-72.82038	-896425	FJD	
86	Palena Chico, Estuario	-43.778964	-72.858272	-896662	FJD	Estero Piti Palena - Piti Palena, Fiordo
87	Costa, Estero	-43.785278	-73.856389	35797	FJD	
88	Plaza, Estero	-43.794722	-73.863333	35798	FJD	
89	Corrao, Canal	-43.823829	-72.951877	-883074	CHNM	Garrao, Canal
90	Abbé, Canal	-43.853902	-72.934414	-871129	CHNM	Abé
91	Puquitín, Canal	-43.871715	-73.931164	-897834	CHNM	
92	Lagreze, Canal	-43.906736	-73.848231	-886403	CHNM	
93	Carbunco, Canal	-43.929167	-73.759444	-875249	CHNM	
94	Betecoi, Canal	-43.929687	-73.862276	-873567	CHNM	Canal Betecoy
95	Cuervo, Canal	-43.953798	-73.930173	-878961	CHNM	
96	Manzano, Canal	-43.957417	-73.644092	-891674	CHNM	
97	Tuamapu, Canal	-43.973254	-74.219309	-903625	CHNM	
98	Leucayec, Canal	-44.000035	-73.793704	-888951	CHNM	
99	Refugio, Canal	-44.039824	-73.139647	-898928	CHNM	
100	Pedregoso, Canal	-44.066278	-73.218356	-895490	CHNM	Pedrogoso, Canal
101	Melimoyu, Seno	-44.080556	-73.121111	-892194	FJD	
102	Mena, Estero	-44.1275	-73.215556	34951	FJD	
103	Chacao, Paso del	-44.13039	-73.676177	-876256	CHNM	
104	Gala, Seno	-44.189444	-73.133611	-882960	FJD	
105	Pihuel, Canal	-44.202257	-73.742646	-896383	CHNM	
106	Miller, Seno	-44.250833	-73.063889	-892444	FJD	
107	Jacaf, Canal	-44.291932	-73.225451	-885202	CHNM	
108	Perez, Canal	-44.30031	-73.753054	-895909	CHNM	Pérez Norte, Canal
109	Dirección, Seno	-44.3	-72.883333	-879729	FJD	
110	Piure, Canal	-44.320938	-73.714786	-896708	CHNM	
111	Oelckers, Canal	-44.33866	-73.138466	-894004	CHNM	Oelkers, Canal
112	Johnson, Fiordo	-44.37747	-74.373526	-885336	CHNM	
113	Frödden, Canal	-44.379184	-73.132239	-882880	CHNM	Frödden, Canal
114	Galvarino, Paso	-44.384722	-72.604722	-883017	CHNM	
115	Simpson, Canal	-44.399376	-74.354389	-901697	CHNM	
116	Skorpios, Canal	-44.405556	-73.896667	35971	CHNM	
117	Alanta, Canal	-44.407706	-74.059235	-871606	CHNM	Atlanta, Canal
118	Guesalaga, Seno	-44.413826	-72.940396	-883905	FJD	
119	Chalquemuan, Boca de	-44.416451	-73.251408	-900004	CHNM	Salquemán, Canal
120	Ventisquero, Seno	-44.440709	-72.616458	-904187	FJD	
121	Dirección, Seno	-44.446471	-72.721162	-879730	FJD	
122	Carlos, Seno	-44.459722	-73.0375	-875371	FJD	
123	J. Fernández, Fiordo	-44.46146	-74.11018	-885322	FJD	
124	Baeza, Canal	-44.469766	-73.884326	-872937	CHNM	
125	Tahuenahuec, Fiordo	-44.485363	-74.043274	-902244	FJD	
126	Soto, Seno	-44.488889	-72.924722	-901954	FJD	
127	Chipana, Canal	-44.494167	-73.627778	-877054	CHNM	
128	Simpson, Fiordo	-44.496781	-74.385434	-901700	FJD	
129	Gay, Fiordo	-44.504372	-74.364332	-883126	CHNM	
130	Queulat, Seno	-44.512222	-72.563889	-898147	FJD	
131	Ema, Laguna	-44.512501	-74.031944	-882001	FJD	
132	Sibbald, Paso	-44.51761	-72.683311	-901604	CHNM	
133	Ancho, Paso	-44.5	-72.716667	-872189	CHNM	
134	Canalad, Estero	-44.545278	-73.181389	-874962	FJD	Canalad, Seno
135	Chaffers, Canal	-44.548615	-74.095783	-876335	CHNM	
136	Lobada de Quetros, Golfillo de la	-44.549444	-73.843889	-889473	SD	
137	King, Canal	-44.588176	-74.311428	-885593	CHNM	
138	Lautaro, Paso	-44.610833	-74.341389	35895	CHNM	
139	Magdalena, Seno	-44.641591	-72.881863	-891261	FJD	
140	Cuptana, Estero	-44.7	-73.666667	-879162	FJD	
141	Cuptana, Canalcito	-44.751662	-73.737189	-902569	CHNM	Temuán, Canal
142	Pangal, Estero	-44.783226	-73.273622	-894987	FJD	Pangal, Fiordo
143	Bynoe, Canal	-44.808721	-74.206093	-874329	CHNM	Bynon, Canal
144	Adventure, Bahía	-44.815864	-74.703671	-871247	SD	Aventura, Bahía
145	Memoria, Canal	-44.816149	-74.285896	-892242	CHNM	Memory, Canal
146	Tránsito, Canal	-44.830042	-73.710429	39883	CHNM	
147	Pérez Sur, Canal	-44.835171	-73.770585	-895913	CHNM	
148	Salas, Canal	-44.889079	-74.430366	-899936	CHNM	
149	Cai, Canal	-44.932853	-73.298468	-897934	CHNM	Cay, Puyuguapi, Canal
150	Ciriaco, Canal	-44.957402	-73.86547	-877443	CHNM	
151	Cisnes, Estero	-44.971461	-74.051536	-877450	FJD	
152	Goñi, Canal	-44.975489	-74.388563	-883249	CHNM	
153	Minualaca, Canal	-45.028793	-74.370998	-893732	CHNM	Ninualac, Canal
154	Ñancul, Canal	-45.050005	-73.463468	-893290	CHNM	
155	Luchín, Canal	-45.082943	-73.441402	-891062	CHNM	
156	Caruso, Canal	-45.086635	-73.433123	-875586	CHNM	
157	Vera, Fiordo	-45.088559	-73.294776	-904194	FJD	
158	Ferronave, Canal	-45.09365	-73.479194	-882628	CHNM	
159	Melchor, Fiordo	-45.110256	-74.147825	-892187	FJD	
160	Devia, Canal	-45.140941	-73.315352	-879575	CHNM	Devia, Paso
161	Los Maceteros, Paso	-45.183333	-73.566667	-890408	CHNM	
162	Carrera del Chivato, Canal	-45.194186	-74.067769	-877097	CHNM	Carrera del Chivato, Pasaje - Chivato, Carrera del
163	Pilcomayo, Canal	-45.231695	-73.54917	-896400	CHNM	
164	Manco, Estero	-45.313537	-73.23293	-891562	FJD	Mar, Fiordo
165	Rodríguez, Canal	-45.316193	-73.586483	-899558	CHNM	
166	Bután, Estero	-45.316667	-74.266667	-874317	FJD	Bután, Fiordo
167	Victoria, Fiordo	-45.334336	-74.085374	-904335	FJD	
168	Carrera del Cuchi, Pasaje	-45.342163	-74.077537	-878928	CHNM	Cuchi, Carrera del - Carrera del Cuchi, Canal
169	Aisen, Estero de	-45.35	-73.1	-871562	FJD	Aisen, Estuario de - Aisén, Fiordo - Aisén, Seno - Aysen, Estero - Aysen, Estrecho - Aysen, Estuario de - Aysen, Seno
170	Pichirupa, Canal	-45.356851	-74.108929	-896186	CHNM	
171	Medio, Paso del	-45.364091	-73.58804	-892137	CHNM	
172	Moraleda, Canal	-45.368674	-73.657157	-892968	CHNM	
173	Agüea, Canal	-45.395067	-74.175783	-879387	CHNM	Ahuea, Canal de - Darwin, Canal. See also Darwin Sound
174	Unicornio, Canal	-45.406247	-74.257824	-903823	CHNM	
175	Casma, Paso	-45.407038	-73.607777	-875736	CHNM	
176	Winthuisen, Boca	-45.416667	-73.5	-904859	CHNM	
177	Empedrado, Estero	-45.466667	-73.95	-882024	FJD	
178	Doble Norte, Canal	-45.51429	-74.300634	-879955	FJD	Dublé Norte, Canal - Duble Norte, Estero - Dublé Norte, Fiordo
179	Doble Sur, Canal	-45.57108	-74.262062	-879956	FJD	Dublé Sur, Canal - Duble Sur, Estero - Dublé Sur, Fiordo
180	Utarupa, Canal	-45.585215	-74.176481	-903884	CHNM	
181	Vicuña, Canal	-45.595836	-74.100156	-904351	CHNM	
182	Sucio, Paso	-45.656889	-74.881558	-902069	CHNM	
183	Fernández, Estero	-45.669807	-74.208439	-882618	FJD	
184	Antonio, Canal	-45.693997	-74.691748	39777	CHNM	
185	Prorromant, Canal	-45.704159	-74.781952	-897297	CHNM	
186	Lyng, Estero	-45.709537	-74.372635	-891149	FJD	Lyng, Fiordo
187	Errázuriz, Canal	-45.713645	-73.837441	-882150	CHNM	
188	Quitralco, Fiordo	-45.716667	-73.416667	-898569	FJD	Quitralco, Estero
189	Chacabuco, Canal	-45.731382	-74.034665	-876223	CHNM	
190	Balladares, Estero	-45.746917	-74.360039	-873028	FJD	Balladares, Fiordo
191	Clemente, Estero	-45.748117	-74.609493	-877497	FJD	
192	Canquenes, Estero	-45.74915	-74.213262	-875109	CHNM	
193	Williams, Canal	-45.782129	-74.598493	-904830	CHNM	
194	Tres Cruces, Paso	-45.787621	-73.727354	-903393	CHNM	
195	Pulluche, Canal	-45.78874	-74.438572	-897585	CHNM	
196	Costa, Canal	-45.79767	-73.610426	-878710	CHNM	
197	Abandonado, Canal	-45.799828	-74.433668	-871124	CHNM	Abandonados, Canal
198	Lachemu, Paraje	-45.803688	-74.621192	-904807	CHNM	Wickham, Boca
199	Rengifo, Canal	-45.805015	-73.887551	-899046	CHNM	
200	Falso Poluch	-45.820578	-74.275366	-882546	CHNM	Falso Pulluche, Boca
201	Alejandro, Canal	-45.827984	-74.264995	-871694	CHNM	
202	Goñi, Estuario	-45.856729	-74.557825	-883251	FJD	Goñi, Fiordo - Goñi, Estero
203	Serrano, Fiordo	-45.8635	-74.663883	-901548	FJD	Serrano, Estero
204	Carrera del Diablo, Pasaje	-45.884299	-74.021581	-879587	CHNM	Diablo, Carrera del - Carrera del Diablo, Canal
205	Verdugo, Fiordo	-45.887521	-74.13984	-904251	FJD	Verdugo, Estero
206	Walker, Fiordo	-45.900137	-74.433102	-904728	FJD	Walker, Estero
207	Diego Gallego, Puerto	-45.916667	-74.883333	-882985	FJD	Diego Gallegos, Estero - Gallegos, Fiordo - Gallegos, Seno
208	Purgatorio, Seno	-45.9	-74.966667	-897856	FJD	
209	Silva, Fiordo	-45.929971	-74.101751	-901677	FJD	Silva, Estero
210	Nalcayec, Canal	-45.990147	-73.810367	-893265	CHNM	
211	Liucura, Canal	-45.997629	-73.903181	-889204	CHNM	
212	Última Esperanza, Canal	-46.005239	-74.051206	-903795	CHNM	
213	Burns, Abra de	-46.011301	-74.95263	-874277	FJD	Burns, Fiordo - Burns, Seno
214	Vidal, Fiordo	-46.026367	-74.16702	-904374	FJD	Vidal, Estero
215	Áau, Estuario	-46.061929	-73.929526	-873293	FJD	Barro, Estero - Barros, Estuario - Barros Arana, Estuario - Barros Arana, Fiordo - Barros Arana, Estero
216	Tuahuencayec, Canal	-46.131478	-73.941372	-903624	CHNM	
217	Cornish, Entrada	-46.134762	-74.887911	-878544	FJD	Cornish, Fiordo - Cornish, Seno
218	Albano, Estero	-46.143104	-74.13056	-871618	FJD	Albano, Estuario - Albano, Fiordo
219	Odger, Estero	-46.15	-73.683333	40003	FJD	
220	Cupquelán, Estero	-46.151881	-73.501993	-882817	FJD	Cupquelán, Cupquetan, Cupquetán, Cupquetan, Fiordo - Francisco, Estuario - Francisco, Fiordo
221	Auxilio, Estero	-46.165403	-74.771604	-872827	FJD	
222	Elefantes, Estero	-46.166483	-73.656653	-880692	FJD	Elefantes, Estuario - Elefantes, Fiordo
223	Thompson, Fiordo	-46.221194	-73.995724	-902683	FJD	Thompson, Estero
224	Puelma, Fiordo	-46.23318	-74.201403	-897414	FJD	Puelma, Estero
225	Alejandro, Estero	-46.26841	-74.905535	-871696	FJD	Alejandro, Fiordo - Alejandro, Seno - Alexander, Fiordo - Alexander, Seno
226	Gato, Caleta	-46.288285	-75.040514	-883097	FJD	
227	Chasco, Estero	-46.297016	-73.903204	-876672	FJD	Chasco, Estuario del - Chasco, Fiordo
228	San Esteban, Fiordo	-46.3524	-75.056479	-900263	FJD	San Esteban, Estero
229	Quesahuén, Paso	-46.395127	-73.765967	-898117	CHNM	
230	Barranco, Caleta	-46.448413	-75.329814	-877506	FJD	Cliff, Caleta
231	Neuman, Estuario	-46.532433	-74.976518	-893648	FJD	Newman, Estero - Newman, Fiordo - Newman, Seno
232	Inútil, Caleta	-46.594978	-75.425045	-885059	FJD	
233	Cono, Estero	-46.601299	-75.480205	-878331	FJD	Cono, Fiordo
234	Hoppner, Fiordo	-46.695267	-75.41302	-884290	SD	Hoppner, Seno
235	Aldunate, Fiordo	-46.738527	-74.480166	-871684	FJD	Aldunate, Seno
236	Expedición, Fiordo	-46.754799	-74.287719	-882499	FJD	Expedición, Seno
237	Expedición, Paso	-46.766284	-74.326652	-882500	CHNM	
238	South West, Brazo del	-46.783333	-73.1	39888	CHNM	
239	Hollorany, Fiordo	-46.790572	-75.258554	-884219	SD	Holloway, Fiordo - Holloway, Seno
240	Escondido, Fiordo	-46.824073	-74.657147	-882220	FJD	Escondido, Seno
241	Oeste, Brazo	-46.853564	-75.329126	-894006	FJD	
242	Este, Brazo	-46.864773	-75.272887	-882416	FJD	
243	Chacaluat, Estero de	-46.954367	-74.006089	-885568	FJD	Guapeotao, Estrecho - Kelly, Abra - Kelly, Bahía - Kelly, Estero - Kelly, Estuario
244	Benito, Estero	-47.106225	-73.99119	-873519	FJD	Benito, Fiordo
245	Jesuitas, Estuario de los	-47.180133	-74.175592	-885318	SD	Jesuitas, Fiordo - Jesuitas, Seno
246	Julián, Estero	-47.234418	-74.096394	-885472	FJD	Julián, Fiordo
247	Cheap, Canal	-47.245784	-74.415192	-876720	CHNM	
248	San Salvador, Fiordo	-47.271364	-74.18473	-900822	FJD	San Salvador, Estero
249	Canales, Boca de	-47.483731	-74.493028	-874964	CHNM	
250	Jeyanitau, Estero	-47.52517	-74.372002	-897595	FJD	Pulpo, Fiordo - Pulpo, Seno
251	Brazo del Este, Fiordo	-47.578293	-74.18293	-882419	FJD	Este, Brazo del - Este, Fiordo del
252	Steffen, Fiordo	-47.622758	-73.640858	-902005	FJD	Steffen, Estero
253	Brazo del Sudoeste, Fiordo	-47.656111	-74.373995	-902077	FJD	Sudoeste, Fiordo del
254	Brazo del Sur, Fiordo	-47.673914	-74.266134	-902112	FJD	Sur, Fiordo del
255	Rundle, Paso	-47.692579	-75.063451	-899822	CHNM	
256	Eloísa, Estero	-47.710083	-74.598393	-881250	FJD	Eloisa, Fiordo
257	Sur, Brazo del	-47.721066	-74.217497	39889	CHNM	
258	Crosbie, Estero	-47.736855	-74.329196	-878817	FJD	Crosbie, Fiordo - Grosbie, Fiordo
259	Nicolás, Estero	-47.745931	-74.476998	-893664	FJD	Nicolás, Fiordo
260	General Martínez, Canal	-47.782581	-74.14268	-883154	CHNM	Martínez, Canal
261	González, Canal	-47.808802	-74.08072	-883262	FJD	González, Estero
262	Montalva, Canal	-47.818785	-73.544734	-892839	CHNM	
263	Arancibia, Estero	-47.848096	-74.231566	-872455	FJD	Arancibia, Fiordo
264	Sierralta, Canal	-47.85	-74.433333	-901636	CHNM	
265	Suroeste, Paso del	-47.864235	-75.198447	-902155	CHNM	Sur Oeste, Paso
266	Cronge, Canal	-47.866146	-74.595239	-878815	CHNM	Cronjé, Canal
267	Joubert, Canal	-47.879989	-74.503467	-885401	CHNM	
268	Günther, Puerto	-47.883333	-73.483333	-883946	FJD	
269	Fatal, Bahía	-47.899551	-74.788308	-882596	FJD	
270	Tito, Canal	-47.901404	-74.601778	-902838	CHNM	
271	Baker, Canal	-47.905578	-74.484125	-873009	CHNM	Baker, Estrecho
272	Troya, Canal	-47.928741	-73.76107	-903597	CHNM	
273	Scout, Canal	-47.933333	-74.683333	-901392	CHNM	
274	Nassau, Entrada	-47.935858	-74.811932	-893332	FJD	
275	Morgan, Estero	-47.938262	-73.702069	-892993	FJD	Morgan, Fiordo
276	Krüger, Canal	-47.948685	-74.625668	-885628	CHNM	
277	Mitchell, Estero	-47.950136	-73.360905	-892372	FJD	Michell, Fiordo - Mitchell, Fiordo - Mitchell Inlet - Michell, Estero
278	Somerset, Canal	-47.974953	-74.599472	-901913	CHNM	
279	Casma, Estero	-47.989806	-74.098806	-875734	FJD	Casma, Fiordo
280	Montenegro, Estero	-47.990811	-73.522991	-892896	FJD	Montenegro, Fiordo
281	Plaza, Canal	-47.991287	-73.620844	-896785	CHNM	
282	Pluddemann, Paso	-47.994292	-74.753402	-896823	CHNM	
283	Bynoe, Paso	-48.005366	-75.361774	-874328	CHNM	
284	Nuestra Señora, Fiordo	-48.019533	-75.147697	-893889	FJD	Nuestra Señora, Seno
285	Amengual, Estero	-48.036862	-74.127238	-872123	FJD	Amengual, Fiordo
286	Barbarosa, Canal	-48.061378	-75.211258	-873171	CHNM	Barbarossa, Canal - Barbarrosa, Canal - Barbarrosa, Estrecho
287	Alejo, Fiordo	-48.066271	-75.314121	-871701	FJD	Alejo, Seno
288	Rowley, Fiordo	-48.071188	-74.44506	-899749	FJD	
289	Engañoso, Estero	-48.077111	-74.896178	-894447	FJD	Engañoso, Seno - Otto, Fiordo - Otto, Seno
290	Angamos, Estero	-48.078451	-73.808929	-872265	FJD	Angamos, Fiordo
291	Flinn, Fiordo	-48.082917	-75.39371	-882699	FJD	Flinn, Seno - Flynn, Seno
292	García, Fiordo	-48.088223	-75.25608	-883043	FJD	García, Seno
293	Landgren, Estero	-48.090025	-73.724077	-886994	FJD	Landgren, Fiordo
294	Nef, Estero	-48.094011	-74.22616	-893380	FJD	Nef, Fiordo - Neff, Fiordo - Net, Estero
295	Monte, Fiordo	-48.098192	-75.304081	-892846	FJD	Monte, Seno - Montes, Seno - Montiel, Seno
296	Kasper, Estero	-48.118376	-75.16141	-885558	FJD	Kasper, Fiordo - Kasper, Seno
297	Edmonds, Fiordo	-48.128425	-75.283572	-880060	FJD	Edmonds, Seno
298	Cálen, Estuario	-48.129994	-73.464087	-874686	FJD	Calén, Fiordo - Galen, Fiordo
299	Alvarado, Estero	-48.131133	-75.249942	-872040	FJD	Alvarado, Fiordo - Alvarado, Seno
300	Unión, Canal	-48.13217	-75.277755	-903828	CHNM	
301	Tomás, Paso	-48.15	-75.283333	-902936	CHNM	
302	Schlucht, Paso	-48.160531	-74.825763	-901373	CHNM	
303	Hornby, Estrecho	-48.171864	-74.768103	-884312	SD	Hornby, Seno
304	Gallardo, Fiordo	-48.178944	-75.234955	-882980	FJD	Gallardo, Seno
305	Steele, Fiordo	-48.180578	-73.314796	-902003	FJD	Steele, Estero
306	Steil, Fiordo	-48.193297	-75.130888	-902008	FJD	
307	Términus, Brazo	-48.211325	-74.208144	-902641	FJD	
308	Codo, Brazo	-48.212006	-74.096384	-877602	FJD	Codo, Estero - Codo, Fiordo
309	Ventisquero, Fiordo	-48.213073	-73.565386	-904179	FJD	
310	Miranda, Fiordo	-48.217696	-75.221625	-892615	FJD	Miranda, Seno
311	Van der Meulen, Fiordo	-48.234384	-74.493044	-904034	FJD	
312	Pacheco, Estero	-48.236963	-75.199582	-894546	FJD	Pacheco, Fiordo - Pacheco, Seno
313	Tortuoso, Fiordo	-48.256947	-75.056221	-903143	FJD	
314	Rothenburg, Fiordo	-48.289299	-75.175875	-899737	FJD	
315	Horacio, Fiordo	-48.309688	-74.096516	-884292	FJD	Horacio, Seno
316	Albatros, Bahía	-48.322138	-75.026629	-871622	FJD	Albatros, Fiordo - Albatross, Bahía
317	Eusquiza, Fiordo	-48.327885	-75.138301	-882472	FJD	Eusquiza, Seno
318	Dreising, Fiordo	-48.35884	-74.827975	-879936	FJD	Dreising, Seno
319	Vela, Fiordo	-48.36232	-75.266936	-904127	FJD	
320	Sur, Brazo	-48.396814	-75.100741	-902105	CHNM	
321	MacVicar, Fiordo	-48.409846	-75.117542	-891223	FJD	Mac-Vicar, Seno
322	Araya, Fiordo	-48.449545	-75.299634	-872469	FJD	Araya, Seno - Arayo, Seno
323	Albatros, Canal	-48.462146	-74.96712	-871621	CHNM	Albatros, Estrecho - Albatross, Canal - Cortes Ojea, Canal
324	Cruz del Sur, Fiordo	-48.467529	-75.061136	-878868	FJD	Cruz del Sur, Seno
325	Caldcleugh, Canal	-48.470126	-74.234457	-874665	CHNM	Caldcleugh, Estero - Caldcleugh, Estrecho - Caldcleugh, Seno - Caldeleugh, Estero - Caldeleugh, Fiordo
326	Rojas, Fiordo	-48.476153	-75.363601	-899578	FJD	
327	Este, Brazo del	-48.494382	-74.419733	-882417	CHNM	
328	Galland, Estero	-48.513055	-75.219001	-882975	FJD	Galland, Fiordo - Galland, Seno
329	Bernardo, Estero	-48.518428	-74.016393	-873543	FJD	Bernardo, Fiordo
330	Toro, Fiordo	-48.574517	-75.256165	-903026	FJD	
331	Oeste, Brazo del	-48.575716	-74.415738	-894007	CHNM	
332	Farquar, Canal	-48.577012	-74.365602	-882587	CHNM	Farquhar, Canal - Farquhar, Estrecho
333	Heinrichs, Estero	-48.57904	-74.893671	-884062	FJD	Heinrichs, Fiordo - Heinrichs, Seno - Heinsichs, Fiordo
334	Adalbert, Canal	-48.587465	-74.958524	-871216	CHNM	Adalberto, Canal - Adalberto, Estrecho
335	Marfán, Fiordo	-48.588162	-75.205469	-891768	FJD	Marfan, Seno
336	Valenzuela, Fiordo	-48.614784	-75.176074	-903957	FJD	
337	Farquar, Estero	-48.667142	-74.211739	-882588	FJD	Farquhar, Estero - Farquhar, Fiordo
338	Havana, Estero	-48.672155	-74.925896	-884041	FJD	Havana, Fiordo
339	Kravel, Codo	-48.688551	-74.748807	-885625	FJD	Kravel, Fiordo
340	Octubre, Canal	-48.69116	-75.198745	-894003	CHNM	Octubre, Estrecho
341	Latorre, Canal	-48.698531	-74.57197	-901411	CHNM	Search, Estrecho
342	Iceberg, Seno	-48.70868	-74.185067	-902560	FJD	Témpano, Fiordo
343	Albatross, Canal	-48.746993	-74.980054	-882136	CHNM	Erhardt, Canal - Erhardt, Estrecho
344	Cochrane, Canal	-48.761452	-75.22641	-877574	CHNM	Cochrane, Estrecho
345	Wald, Fiordo	-48.768121	-74.570146	-904721	FJD	
346	Castillo, Canal	-48.781107	-75.541247	-875778	CHNM	Castillo, Estrecho del - Castillo, Canal del
347	Veintiuno de Mayo, Estrecho	-48.782809	-75.479442	-904126	CHNM	
348	Don José, Estero	-48.785891	-74.937687	-879859	FJD	Don José, Fiordo - Don José, Seno
349	Luis, Seno	-48.80626	-75.523625	-891083	FJD	
350	Consuelo, Estero	-48.824071	-75.531684	-878359	FJD	Consuelo, Fiordo - Consuelo, Seno
351	Mutilla, Estero	-48.83	-75.42115	-893204	FJD	Mutilla, Fiordo - Mutilla, Seno
352	Artigas, Seno	-48.850398	-74.901548	-883974	FJD	Artioas, Estero - Hachman, Estero - Hachman, Fiordo - Hachman, Seno
353	Gaete, Seno	-48.85809	-75.324905	-899560	FJD	Rodríguez, Fiordo
354	Denman, Estero	-48.863311	-74.37383	-879465	FJD	Denman, Fiordo
355	Mesier, Canal	-48.882495	-74.431023	-892331	CHNM	Messier, Canal
356	Walkyren, Fiordo	-48.904159	-74.894698	-904729	FJD	
357	Seymour, Fiordo	-48.911596	-74.51743	-901567	FJD	
358	Fallos, Canal	-48.911659	-74.974888	-882532	CHNM	
359	Condell, Caleta	-48.916664	-75.267679	-878230	FJD	Condell, Fiordo - Condell, Seno
360	Valenzuela, Seno	-48.926843	-75.328487	-903964	FJD	
361	Lamire, Estero	-48.944659	-75.571077	-886926	FJD	
362	Cárcamo, Paso	-48.945724	-75.327968	-875253	CHNM	
363	Corto, Estero	-48.946912	-74.908052	-878688	FJD	
364	La Rodilla	-48.954832	-75.010881	-902677	CHNM	The Knick, Paso
365	Triple, Estero	-48.954898	-74.833198	-903545	FJD	Triple Fiordo
366	Riquelme, Canal	-48.967914	-75.600226	-899410	CHNM	
367	Sotomayor, Estrecho	-48.997025	-75.141132	-901957	CHNM	Sotomayor, Canal
368	Lynch, Fiordo	-49.00561	-75.297973	-891143	FJD	Lynch, Seno
369	Beauchamp, Estero	-49.011277	-74.480808	-873421	FJD	Beauchamp, Fiordo - Beauchamp, Seno
370	Covadonga, Canal	-49.034905	-75.431654	-878744	CHNM	Covadonga, Estrecho - Covadonga, Seno
371	Sanz, Fiordo	-49.036922	-75.389862	-901264	FJD	
372	Duke de Edimburgo, Bahía	-49.077167	-74.368017	-879996	FJD	Duque de Edimburgo, Ensenada - Duque de Edimburgo, Fiordo - Duque de Edimburgo, Seno - Duque de Edinburgo, Seno
373	Cirujano, Seno	-49.102147	-75.469942	-877449	FJD	
374	Inútil, Canal	-49.108214	-75.569148	-885060	CHNM	
375	Videla, Seno	-49.108637	-75.510174	-904388	FJD	
376	Norte, Canal	-49.116667	-74.416667	-893817	CHNM	Norte, Canalizo
377	Wilcke, Seno	-49.119983	-75.155873	-904820	FJD	
378	Araya, Fiordo	-49.120296	-75.324599	-872470	FJD	Araya, Seno
379	Bandisin, Canal	-49.133333	-75.216667	-873366	CHNM	Baudissin, Canal
380	Hernán Gallego, Canal	-49.15123	-75.187083	-884104	CHNM	Hernán Gallego, Estrecho
381	Este, Canal	-49.15	-74.416667	-882418	CHNM	
382	Kalau, Paso	-49.15281	-75.223892	-885556	CHNM	
383	Sur, Canal	-49.166667	-74.433333	-902108	CHNM	
384	Reindeer, Fiordo	-49.177676	-74.333831	-898962	FJD	
385	Orella, Canal	-49.197221	-75.646508	-894341	CHNM	
386	Manuel, Paso	-49.205727	-74.397735	-891653	CHNM	
387	Laberinto, Canal del	-49.218792	-75.24699	-885724	CHNM	
388	Chico, Estero	-49.251433	-75.27781	-876845	FJD	Chico, Fiordo - Chico, Seno
389	Ladrillero, Canal	-49.256954	-75.459822	-886138	CHNM	Ladrillero, Estrecho, Stosch Channel
390	Klippen, Estero	-49.299391	-75.371387	-885608	FJD	Klippen, Fiordo - Pedregoso, Estero
391	Doña Ana, Estero	-49.303223	-75.14727	-879823	FJD	
392	Solitario, Estero	-49.303344	-75.054768	-901871	FJD	
393	Exmouth, Fiordo	-49.312932	-73.93021	-882492	FJD	Exmouth, Seno - Eyre, Fiordo
394	Roberto, Fiordo	-49.318592	-75.241867	-899478	FJD	
395	Inútil, Estero	-49.333333	-75.15	-885062	FJD	
396	Eyre, Estero	-49.354418	-74.085129	-882514	FJD	Eyre, Fiordo - Eyre, Seno
397	Machado, Canal	-49.360156	-74.861717	-891178	CHNM	Machado, Estrecho
398	Lawinen, Estero	-49.362456	-74.658608	-904180	FJD	Lawinen, Fiord - Lawinen, Seno - Lawinnen, Fiord - Ventisquero, Fiordo - Ventisquero, Seno
399	Desengaño, Estero	-49.362791	-75.256408	-879520	FJD	Desengaño, Fiordo - Falscher, Estero
400	Indio, Fiordo del	-49.380708	-74.407525	-884959	CHNM	Indio, Paso del
401	Insel, Fiord	-49.38589	-74.750779	-885132	FJD	Isla, Fiordo - Isla, Seno
402	Maldonado, Estero	-49.396272	-75.188152	-891422	FJD	Maldonado, Fiordo
403	Picton, Paso	-49.408445	-75.440873	-896224	CHNM	
404	Adelaida, Estero	-49.414164	-75.083579	-871226	FJD	Adelaida, Fiordo
405	Parkwasser, Estero	-49.419103	-74.678863	-895236	FJD	Parkwasser, Fiord - Parque, Estero - Parque, Fiordo - Parque, Seno
406	Cohen, Estero	-49.432027	-75.366162	-877624	FJD	Cohen, Estuario - Cohen, Fiordo
407	Marzo, Estero	-49.441795	-75.310446	-891902	FJD	Marzo, Fiordo - Marzo, Seno
408	Sorpresa, Fiordo	-49.446279	-75.343718	-901941	FJD	
409	Romántico, Fiordo	-49.460534	-74.861788	-899605	FJD	Romántico, Seno
410	Eversfield, Fiordo	-49.480475	-75.243839	-882486	FJD	Eversfield, Seno
411	Cascada, Bahía	-49.481191	-74.977277	-875690	FJD	
412	Grapple, Estrecho	-49.495356	-74.269924	-883436	CHNM	Grappler, Canal
413	Salvaje, Quebrada	-49.502163	-74.719845	-900040	FJD	
414	Veto, Fiordo	-49.508661	-74.508405	-904297	FJD	Veto, Estero
415	Espejo, Fiordo	-49.525446	-74.993825	-882284	FJD	Espejo, Seno
416	Miramar, Canal	-49.53032	-75.486874	-892612	CHNM	Miramar, Estrecho
417	Norte, Brazo	-49.530437	-74.888471	-893812	CHNM	
418	Falcon, Estero	-49.548349	-73.877777	-882526	FJD	Falcón, Fiordo - Falcón, Seno
419	Enten, Fiord	-49.559642	-75.039668	-895409	FJD	Patos, Fiordo - Patos, Seno
420	Artillería, Fiordo	-49.559962	-75.247323	-872651	FJD	Artillería, Seno - Gunn, Fiord
421	Charteris, Paso	-49.564037	-74.19861	-876668	CHNM	
422	Abismo, Canal del	-49.596853	-74.444441	-871134	CHNM	Abismo, Paso del - Chasm, Canal - Chasm Reach
423	Escape, Canal	-49.599638	-74.442744	-882183	CHNM	Escape, Paso
424	Brazo Izquierdo Beresford, Estero	-49.605736	-75.182814	-874036	FJD	Brazo Izquierdo Beresford, Fiordo - Izquierdo Beresford, Brazo
425	Icy, Canal	-49.608242	-74.296967	-884818	CHNM	Icy, Paso
426	Alpen, Fiordo	-49.627324	-74.762332	-871887	FJD	Alpen, Seno
427	Cock, Fiord	-49.649291	-75.180537	-878399	FJD	Cook, Estero - Cook, Fiordo - Cook, Seno
428	Backout, Estero	-49.66863	-74.51077	-872933	FJD	Backout, Fiordo - Bakout, Fiordo
429	Dinwoodie, Bahía	-49.67694	-75.214006	-879705	FJD	
430	Paine, Estuario	-49.68109	-75.285582	-895449	FJD	Payne, Bahía - Payne, Estero
431	Bethel, Bahía	-49.685976	-75.220057	-873569	FJD	Bethell, Bahía
432	Cappinger, Bahía	-49.712962	-75.201102	-878449	FJD	Coppin, Bahía - Coppinger, Bahía
433	Ringdove, Fiordo	-49.740276	-74.177	-899330	FJD	Ringdove, Estero
434	Interior, Estero	-49.742385	-74.521421	-885047	FJD	Interior, Fiordo - Interior, Seno
435	Norte, Brazo	-49.74559	-74.902938	-893821	FJD	Norte, Fiordo del
436	Antrim, Estuario	-49.754778	-74.450083	-872388	FJD	Antrim, Fiordo - Antrim, Seno - Antrim, Estero
437	Petley, Estero	-49.756865	-75.149568	-895986	FJD	Petley, Fiordo - Petley, Seno - Pettey, Bahía
438	Cono, Brazo	-49.758396	-74.996281	-878332	FJD	Cono, Fiordo
439	Stange, Fiordo	-49.765018	-74.776294	-901991	FJD	
440	Marsh, Fiordo	-49.844792	-74.73089	-891866	FJD	Marsh, Seno
441	Neesham, Estero	-49.865824	-75.049938	-893379	FJD	Neesham, Fiordo
442	Gage, Estero	-49.870249	-74.445375	-882955	FJD	Gage, Estuario - Gage, Fiordo
443	Picton, Canal	-49.882622	-75.132328	-896222	CHNM	
444	Trinidad, Canal	-49.901977	-75.402347	-903535	CHNM	
445	Yorsin, Fiordo	-49.915458	-74.740792	-905036	FJD	Yorsin, Seno
446	Jarpa, Fiordo	-49.92026	-73.903589	-885280	FJD	Jarpa, Seno
447	White, Fiordo	-49.936203	-74.567793	-904797	FJD	White, Estero
448	Dock, Estero	-49.945205	-74.466704	-879785	FJD	Dock, Fiordo - Dock, Seno
449	Husbands, Estero	-49.966091	-74.330743	-884775	FJD	Husbands, Fiordo - Husbands, Seno
450	Penguin, Estero	-49.983333	-74.1	-895743	FJD	Penguin, Estuario - Pengüin, Fiordo - Penguin, Seno - Pengüin, Seno
451	Notre Dame, Estero	-50.007538	-74.801638	-893890	FJD	Nuestra Señora, Estuario - Nuestra Señora, Fiordo
452	Wilshere, Fiordo	-50.014388	-74.668681	-904843	FJD	
453	Wolsey, Abra	-50.0275	-75.301667	-904866	FJD	
454	Crámer, Seno	-50.034067	-75.239202	-878782	FJD	Crammer, Abra - Crammer, Estuario - Crammer, Seno - Grammer, Estuario
455	Hasting, Estero	-50.040721	-74.656713	-884037	FJD	Hastings, Fiordo
456	Craig, Bahía	-50.06644	-75.067549	-886890	FJD	Lamero, Ensenada - Lamero, Seno
457	Lecky, Estero	-50.073193	-74.512959	-888803	FJD	Lecky, Fiordo
458	Brassey, Paso	-50.078818	-74.756305	-874016	CHNM	
459	Ancho, Canal	-50.07981	-74.627069	-904814	CHNM	Ancho, Estrecho - Broad Reach - Wide, Canal
460	Caffin, Paso	-50.101047	-74.814281	-874535	CHNM	
461	East, Bahía	-50.144986	-74.815091	-880040	FJD	Este, Bahía
462	Sudoeste, Ancón del	-50.145364	-74.981792	-902075	FJD	
463	Delgado, Ensenada	-50.149651	-74.871275	-879437	FJD	Delgado, Seno
464	Day, Bahía	-50.15531	-74.776267	-879406	FJD	
465	Lastarria, Brazo	-50.167313	-75.121307	-888348	FJD	Lastarria, Fiordo - Lasterria, Brazo
466	Señoret, Fiordo	-50.197842	-74.827964	-901521	FJD	Señoret, Puerto
467	Tres Cerros, Paso	-50.208958	-74.711705	-903382	CHNM	
468	Europa, Estero	-50.218961	-74.165678	-882469	FJD	Europa, Estuario - Europa, Fiordo - Europa, Seno
469	Temple, Estero	-50.225534	-74.92084	-902567	CHNM	
470	Don Pedro, Abra	-50.230295	-74.852158	-879875	FJD	Don Pedro, Estero
471	Molynèaux, Estuario	-50.285223	-74.899047	-892780	FJD	Molyneux, Seno
472	Fuentes, Fiordo	-50.328992	-74.299124	-882913	FJD	Fuentes, Seno
473	Andres, Canal	-50.345253	-74.749288	-872253	CHNM	Andrés, Estrecho - Andrés, Seno - Andrew, Canal - Andrew, Seno
474	Contreras, Fiordo	-50.356035	-75.272254	-878384	FJD	Contreras, Seno
475	Guilardi, Fiordo	-50.3777	-74.070527	-883919	FJD	Guillardi, Seno
476	Eleuterio, Fiordo	-50.379895	-75.38107	-880769	FJD	Eleuterio, Seno
477	Grove, Canal	-50.38434	-75.141647	-883494	CHNM	Grove, Estrecho - Grove, Seno
478	Monteith, Canal	-50.407722	-75.06647	-892885	CHNM	Monteith, Estrecho - Monteith, Seno
479	Norte, Entrada	-50.4	-74.75	-893820	CHNM	
480	Sur, Entrada del	-50.4	-74.766667	-902110	CHNM	
481	Rossi, Canal	-50.45	-75.2	-899731	CHNM	
482	Andrew, Seno	-50.451947	-73.603306	-872256	FJD	
483	Oeste, Canal	-50.455496	-75.358616	-894008	CHNM	Oeste, Estrecho
484	Santa Rosa, Paso	-50.456944	-75.221389	-901151	CHNM	
485	Andres, Bahía	-50.465184	-74.152592	-872254	FJD	Andrés, Fiordo - Andrés, Estero
486	Metalero, Paso	-50.471111	-75.457222	-892335	CHNM	
487	Pasaje, Canal	-50.472755	-75.133736	-895267	CHNM	Pasaje, Estrecho - Pasaje, Seno
488	Calabrés, Canal	-50.479542	-75.248242	-874632	CHNM	
489	Artillería, Canal	-50.486479	-74.693647	-872650	CHNM	Artillería, Estrecho
490	Susana, Seno	-50.487014	-75.422468	-902160	FJD	
491	Inocentes, Canal	-50.492388	-74.848544	-885041	CHNM	Inocentes, Estrecho
492	Palo, Fiordo	-50.502632	-75.281348	-894805	FJD	Palo, Seno
493	Francis, Seno	-50.595969	-75.268485	-882826	FJD	Francisco, Fiordo - Francisco, Seno
494	Puntería, Seno	-50.652999	-75.265258	-897738	FJD	
495	Calvo, Estero	-50.656116	-73.547036	-874794	FJD	Calvo, Fiordo
496	Gómez Carreño, Estero	-50.699004	-75.367361	-883245	FJD	Gomez Garreño, Fiordo
497	Asia, Estero	-50.769274	-73.807317	-872689	FJD	Asia, Fiordo
498	Concepción, Canal	-50.775388	-75.203909	-878184	CHNM	Concepcion, Estrecho de - La Concepcion, Canal de
499	Gonzalez, Canal	-50.835843	-74.96297	-898838	CHNM	Rayo, Estrecho
500	Pitt, Canal	-50.846808	-74.058866	-896679	CHNM	
501	Peel, Estero	-50.871666	-74.181085	-895513	FJD	Peel, Fiordo
502	Farrel, Canal	-50.874984	-74.923546	-882591	CHNM	Farrel, Estrecho - Farrel, Seno
503	Anchor, Paso	-50.916639	-74.370615	-872194	CHNM	
504	Elena, Canal	-50.998508	-74.940119	-880701	CHNM	
505	Santos, Estrecho	-51.043663	-75.000146	-901233	CHNM	
506	Ignacio, Canal	-51.084362	-74.966757	-884844	CHNM	Ignacio, Estrecho
507	Guadalupe, Canal	-51.172575	-74.607449	-883556	CHNM	Guadalupe, Estrecho
508	Stewart, Paso	-51.220369	-74.091534	-902020	CHNM	
509	Esteban, Canal	-51.244453	-74.279546	-882428	CHNM	Esteban, Estrecho
510	Pascua, Estrecho	-51.244621	-74.840261	-895279	CHNM	Pascua, Paso
511	Sharpes, Paso	-51.287407	-74.259776	-901577	CHNM	
512	Benjamín, Brazo	-51.319325	-75.028799	-873521	CHNM	Benjamín, Estrecho - Bonjamín, Brazo
513	Blanche, Paso	-51.326062	-73.896313	-873680	CHNM	
514	Huemul, Fiordo	-51.327877	-75.111504	-884518	FJD	Huemul, Seno
515	Themis, Abra	-51.377793	-74.106544	-902678	FJD	
516	Los Torrentes, Seno de	-51.37848	-74.892165	-903092	FJD	Torrentes, Fiordo de los
517	Abraham, Fiordo	-51.382965	-75.046073	-871144	FJD	Abraham, Seno
518	Childers, Paso	-51.387842	-73.979607	-876919	CHNM	
519	Escape, Bahía	-51.388669	-74.198118	-882184	FJD	Escape, Fiordo
520	Elena, Canal	-51.426823	-74.525354	-880702	CHNM	Elena, Paso
521	San Blas, Estrecho	-51.43221	-75.069126	-900183	CHNM	
522	Arcabuz, Estero	-51.445168	-75.140608	-872497	FJD	Arcabuz, Fiordo
523	Tarleton, Paso	-51.469472	-74.128181	-902472	CHNM	
524	Diego de Almagro, Paso	-51.491083	-75.109358	-879671	CHNM	
525	Elías, Canal	-51.492072	-74.99246	-880890	CHNM	Elías, Estrecho
526	Última Esperanza, Seno	-51.521434	-72.963374	-903797	FJD	
527	Castro, Canal	-51.534063	-74.79304	-875802	CHNM	Castro, Paso
528	Errázuriz, Paso	-51.550325	-75.118056	-882152	CHNM	
529	Erezcano, Fiordo	-51.568032	-73.0578	-882134	FJD	Erezcano, Seno
530	Eberhardt, Estero	-51.589606	-72.674706	-880042	FJD	
531	Heywood, Paso	-51.676206	-74.313419	-884136	CHNM	
532	Señoret, Canal	-51.688946	-72.586389	-901519	CHNM	
533	El Túnel, Pasaje	-51.693347	-74.523031	-881938	CHNM	El Túnel, Paso
534	Worsley, Fiordo	-51.69539	-73.170991	-904874	FJD	
535	Sarmiento, Estrecho	-51.702653	-73.939566	-901309	CHNM	
536	Borcosky, Fiordo	-51.753513	-73.093488	-873931	FJD	Borcosky, Seno
537	Nelson, Estrecho	-51.754554	-75.266114	-893601	CHNM	
538	Farquhar, Paso	-51.815394	-73.829393	-882590	CHNM	
539	Nantuel, Canal	-51.824511	-74.727159	-893303	CHNM	Nantuel, Seno
540	Vargas, Fiordo	-51.828899	-74.885167	-904063	FJD	
541	Montañas, Canal de las	-51.857065	-73.303649	-892840	FJD	Montañas, Estero de las - Montañas, Fiordo de las
542	Medio, Paso	-51.866667	-72.9	-892136	CHNM	
543	Norte, Paso	-51.866667	-72.916667	-893829	CHNM	
544	Almirante Montt, Golfo	-51.874146	-72.707355	-871868	SD	
545	Resi, Fiordo	-51.87791	-73.120691	-899100	FJD	
546	Sur, Paso	-51.883333	-72.9	-902118	CHNM	
547	Vidal Gormaz, Canal	-51.905714	-74.994591	-904377	CHNM	
548	Cutler, Paso	-51.905799	-74.343097	-879304	CHNM	Cutter, Paso
549	Taraba, Fiordo	-51.910879	-73.489378	-902454	FJD	Taraba, Seno
550	Serrano, Paso	-51.92525	-74.35029	-901554	CHNM	
551	White, Canal	-51.930438	-73.061896	-904796	CHNM	
552	Collingwood, Estrecho	-51.948502	-73.644375	-877883	CHNM	
553	Riquelme, Paso	-51.951709	-74.37884	-899419	CHNM	
554	Desencanto, Estero	-52.004932	-74.888443	-879517	FJD	Desencanto, Fiordo
555	Uribe, Canal	-52.012776	-74.409956	-903857	CHNM	
556	Cutler, Canal	-52.029212	-74.125959	-879302	CHNM	
557	Victoria, Paso	-52.032697	-73.738877	-904340	CHNM	
558	Diana, Paso	-52.042852	-74.26882	-879634	CHNM	
559	Molinas, Canal	-52.044192	-74.240067	-892704	CHNM	
560	Meteoro, Seno	-52.061975	-74.279341	-892347	SD	
561	Mal Paso	-52.066667	-73	-891475	CHNM	
562	Tornamesa, Paso	-52.066667	-74.233333	-903000	CHNM	
563	Golondrina, Paso	-52.071681	-74.389458	-883231	CHNM	Golondrinas, Paso
564	Unión, Seno	-52.072124	-73.577562	-903834	SD	
565	Santa María, Canal	-52.082112	-73.122179	-901065	CHNM	
566	Bauprés, Paso	-52.083333	-74.25	-873368	CHNM	
567	Meteoro, Paso	-52.083333	-74.3	-892346	CHNM	
568	Kirke, Canal	-52.090828	-73.109181	-885603	CHNM	Kirke, Paso
569	Ballena, Seno	-52.104629	-74.517227	-873049	SD	
570	Morla Vicuña, Canal	-52.104692	-73.228604	-893000	CHNM	
571	Nuevo, Canal	-52.10635	-74.710494	-893909	CHNM	
572	Castillo, Canal	-52.109518	-74.387689	-875760	CHNM	
573	Toro, Paso	-52.138754	-73.946624	-903042	CHNM	
574	Valdés, Canal	-52.144432	-72.990504	-903913	CHNM	
575	Nogueira, Canal	-52.146501	-74.907914	-893780	CHNM	Nogueira, Estrecho
576	Juan Grove, Canal	-52.146792	-74.414215	-885432	CHNM	
577	Enjambre, Seno del	-52.15	-74	-882071	SD	Enjambres, Seno
578	Juan Bravo, Paso	-52.15	-74.083333	-885419	CHNM	
579	Montt, Canal	-52.168759	-74.806297	-892924	CHNM	
580	Viel, Canal	-52.169571	-73.93798	-904404	CHNM	
581	Ballena, Canal	-52.172734	-74.565753	-873030	CHNM	Ballena, Seno de la
582	Huemul, Canal	-52.182786	-74.796406	-884512	CHNM	
583	Poca Esperanza, Estero	-52.188883	-72.957149	-896844	FJD	
584	Smyth, Canal	-52.215635	-73.615905	-901775	CHNM	
585	Marazzi, Canal	-52.2	-73.8	-891747	CHNM	Marazzi, Paso
586	Obstrucción, Estero	-52.238452	-72.53563	-893966	FJD	Obstrucción, Fiordo - Obstrucción, Seno
587	Anila, Canal	-52.292564	-74.618614	-872346	CHNM	Anita, Canal
588	Silva Varela, Canal	-52.295367	-74.831794	-901683	CHNM	
589	Jantias, Seno	-52.316667	-73.983333	-885242	FJD	
590	Bannen, Canal	-52.322107	-73.601712	-873132	CHNM	
591	Bello, Seno	-52.329705	-73.770639	-885317	FJD	Jessen, Seno
592	Hernández, Canal	-52.33104	-73.726458	-884100	CHNM	
593	Summer, Paso	-52.333333	-73.666667	-902094	CHNM	
594	Pacheco, Canal	-52.334193	-73.901922	-894544	CHNM	
595	Indio, Paso	-52.335201	-74.631316	-884957	CHNM	
596	Riveros, Seno	-52.352255	-73.804245	-899466	FJD	
597	Britania, Fiordo	-52.366667	-73.966667	-874085	FJD	
598	Canales, Boca de	-52.366667	-74.75	-874965	CHNM	
599	Chica, Boca	-52.366667	-74.766667	-876807	STRT	
600	Grande, Boca	-52.366667	-74.733333	-883339	STRT	
601	Laguera, Paso	-52.366667	-74.616667	-886426	CHNM	
602	Medio, Boca del	-52.366667	-74.75	-892091	STRT	
603	Gray, Canal	-52.375226	-73.69641	-883444	CHNM	
604	Membrillar, Seno	-52.38147	-73.927549	-892234	SD	
605	Mayne, Canal	-52.38231	-73.599227	-892024	CHNM	
606	Gato, Paso	-52.397647	-74.55137	-883102	CHNM	
607	Bertrán, Canal	-52.405879	-74.572731	-873555	CHNM	Bertrand, Canal
608	Lamire, Paso	-52.4	-74.6	-886927	CHNM	
609	Bambach, Canal	-52.42195	-73.835835	-873080	CHNM	Bombach, Canal
610	Esmeralda, Canal	-52.427958	-74.5679	-882250	CHNM	
611	Wilson, Canal	-52.430879	-74.440395	-904846	CHNM	
612	Clapperton, Estero	-52.444023	-73.512726	-877465	FJD	Clapperton, Fiordo
613	O’Higgins, Canal	-52.444869	-74.135079	-894196	CHNM	
614	Águila, Fiordo	-52.491984	-73.501024	-871508	FJD	Águila, Seno
615	Simpson, Canal	-52.533333	-72.583333	-901698	CHNM	
616	Excelsior, Estuario	-52.53838	-72.986609	-882490	FJD	Excelsior, Fiordo - Exelsior - Inaccessible, Bahía
617	Las Rocas, Estero	-52.543915	-72.642502	-888329	FJD	Las Rucas, Estero - Las Rucas, Fiordo
618	La Pera, Estuario	-52.568947	-72.529511	-887205	FJD	La Pera, Fiordo
619	Islas, Ensenada de las	-52.590449	-72.857336	-885150	FJD	Islas, Estero - Islas, Fiordo
620	Guzmán, Estero	-52.600889	-72.89563	-883964	FJD	Guzmán, Fiordo
621	Shoal, Paso	-52.606379	-73.668808	-901595	CHNM	
622	Sargazos, Canal	-52.609546	-74.20441	-901292	CHNM	
623	Skyring, Seno	-52.613241	-71.907408	-901764	SD	
624	Britania, Fiordo	-52.616843	-73.941363	-874086	FJD	Britania, Seno
625	Huemul, Bahía	-52.633227	-72.79689	-884509	FJD	Huemul, Estero - Huemul, Fiordo
626	Muñoz Gamero, Lago	-52.644444	-73.173256	-893166	FJD	
627	Euston, Canal	-52.649551	-72.611821	-882474	CHNM	
628	Valencia, Fiordo	-52.660236	-73.890209	-903943	FJD	
629	Los Ventisqueros, Fiordo de	-52.680169	-72.912666	-890986	FJD	
630	Cascada, Canal	-52.704716	-73.431208	-875695	CHNM	
631	Irene, Canal	-52.716667	-73.366667	-885088	CHNM	
632	Swett, Canal	-52.741418	-73.308491	-902166	CHNM	
633	Crooked, Brazo	-52.754166	-70.837923	-903141	CHNM	Tortuoso, Canal
634	Contreras, Canal	-52.771767	-72.584567	-878381	CHNM	
635	Muñoz, Canal	-52.78817	-73.514149	-893161	CHNM	
636	Glacier, Seno	-52.795907	-73.35437	-883192	SD	
637	Fitzroy, Canal	-52.798921	-71.382149	-882673	CHNM	
638	Beltrand, Canal	-52.807171	-72.450872	-873556	CHNM	Bertrand, Canal
639	Engaño, Estero	-52.810024	-72.797859	-882058	FJD	Engaño, Fiordo
640	Culebra, Paso	-52.816667	-73.433333	-879033	CHNM	
641	Zenteno, Canal	-52.816667	-73.683333	-905169	CHNM	
642	Leucotón, Paso	-52.8	-73.65	-888955	CHNM	
643	Norte, Canalizo	-52.8	-73.416667	-893818	CHNM	
644	Almirante Martínez, Canal	-52.821994	-73.577398	-871867	CHNM	Contra Almirante Martinez, Canal - Martínez, Canal
645	Labbe, Paso	-52.822611	-73.727911	-885720	CHNM	
646	Gajardo, Canal	-52.82705	-72.881143	-882956	CHNM	
647	Sur, Fiordo	-52.829725	-73.44187	-902111	FJD	
648	Caiquén, Seno	-52.83121	-73.373771	-874585	FJD	
649	Vogel, Fiordo	-52.844957	-72.592201	-904674	FJD	
650	Oberreuter, Estero	-52.845906	-72.551237	-893939	FJD	Oberreuter, Fiordo - Overreuter, Estero
651	Navarro, Estero	-52.854913	-72.676836	-893355	FJD	Navarro, Estuario - Navarro, Fiordo
652	Riquelme, Fiordo	-52.855293	-72.448432	-899414	FJD	
653	Real, Paso	-52.907142	-70.812552	-898841	CHNM	
654	Mar, Paso del	-52.916667	-74	-891735	CHNM	
655	Pelícano, Paso	-52.917856	-70.796114	-895632	CHNM	
656	Roda, Paso	-52.933333	-73.783333	-899535	CHNM	
657	Reina, Canal	-52.936726	-70.686007	-898957	CHNM	Reina, Paso
658	Northbrook, Fiordo	-52.939766	-73.247027	-893858	FJD	Northbrook, Seno
659	Sylvia, Canal	-52.963752	-73.462384	-902172	CHNM	
660	Nuevo, Canal	-52.978714	-70.517468	-893910	CHNM	Nuevo, Paso
661	Interior, Paso	-52.983333	-73.466667	-885049	CHNM	
662	Damián, Brazo	-53.012282	-73.963139	-879366	FJD	Damian, Fiordo - Dumian, Brazo
663	Cosme, Brazo	-53.030529	-73.973112	-878705	FJD	Cosme, Fiordo
664	Cripples, Canal	-53.043143	-73.42558	-878798	CHNM	Cripples, Paso
665	Portaluppi, Fiordo	-53.048782	-73.181629	-897018	FJD	Portaluppi, Estuario
666	Puchachailgua, Fiordo	-53.059948	-73.821664	-897354	FJD	Puchachailgua, Estero
667	Lobo, Brazo	-53.060026	-73.911294	-889488	FJD	Lobo, Fiordo
668	Tomás, Bahía	-53.060253	-73.373317	-902934	FJD	Thomas, Bahía
669	Barrister, Bahía	-53.063025	-74.328272	-873284	FJD	Barrister, Fiordo
670	Aguilera, Fiordo	-53.09416	-74.207745	-871521	FJD	
671	Wallis, Seno	-53.097818	-73.672536	-904739	FJD	
672	Fanny, Estuario	-53.100195	-72.315463	-882550	FJD	Fanny, Fiordo
673	Murray, Paso	-53.118489	-74.346899	-893191	CHNM	
674	Galvarino, Ensenada	-53.126306	-72.732921	-883015	FJD	Galvarino, Fiordo - Galvarino, Seno
675	Jaultegua, Golfo de	-53.143529	-73.082203	-904881	SD	Xaultegua, Golfo
676	Gómez Carreño, Estuario	-53.14396	-72.788356	-883246	FJD	Gómez Carreño, Fiordo
677	Vidal, Canal	-53.147564	-74.07403	-904372	CHNM	
678	Córdoba, Estuario	-53.148933	-73.527384	-878516	FJD	Córdova, Estero - Córdova, Fiordo - Córdova, Seno
679	Córdoba, Paso	-53.151935	-73.513121	-878519	CHNM	Córdova, Paso
680	Mana, Canal	-53.152281	-73.821361	-891520	FJD	Mana, Estero - Mana, Estuario - Mana, Fiordo
681	Colcolo, Bahía	-53.176924	-72.978752	-877910	FJD	Colocolo, Ensenada
682	Bending, Estero	-53.198436	-72.354906	-873513	FJD	Bending, Estuario - Bending, Fiordo
683	Canoa, Estero	-53.207218	-73.398565	-875101	FJD	Canoa, Fiordo
684	Tapia, Canal	-53.217064	-73.884136	-902438	CHNM	
685	Bell, Bahía	-53.224837	-73.2167	-874887	FJD	Campana, Bahía
686	Sullivan, Fiordo	-53.235593	-72.50917	-902088	FJD	Sullivan, Estuario
687	Pérez de Arce, Estuario	-53.244227	-72.739243	-895906	FJD	Pérez de Arce, Fiordo
688	Pollard, Caleta	-53.248351	-73.171232	-896916	FJD	
689	Ancho, Canal	-53.254805	-70.74644	-872190	CHNM	Ancho, Paso - Broad, Paso
690	Dynevor, Ensenada	-53.268393	-73.981494	-880036	SD	Dynevor, Seno
691	Cormorant, Estuario	-53.27507	-73.331336	-878533	FJD	Cormorant, Fiordo - Cormorat, Fiordo - Cormorat, Seno
692	Núñez, Brazo	-53.310508	-72.523109	-893923	FJD	
693	Díaz, Paso	-53.316667	-70.433333	-879644	CHNM	
694	Playa Parda, Fiordo	-53.3	-73.05	-896780	FJD	
695	Solar, Paso	-53.3	-70.416667	-901838	CHNM	
696	Rocalloso, Fiordo	-53.325813	-73.210309	-899517	FJD	
697	Abra, Canal	-53.338512	-73.667923	-871137	CHNM	
698	Otway, Bahía	-53.349103	-74.012374	-894448	SD	
699	Wickham, Fiordo	-53.355974	-72.068384	-904809	FJD	Wickham, Estuario
700	Larga, Calle	-53.366667	-73	-887517	CHNM	Largo, Paso - Long Reach
701	Condor, Canal	-53.377329	-72.626955	-878250	FJD	Cóndor, Estero - Cóndor, Fiordo
702	Guirior, Bahía	-53.414813	-72.774711	-883934	FJD	
703	Evans, Canal	-53.416667	-73.833333	-882480	CHNM	Evans, Paso
704	Arathoon, Bahía	-53.418583	-73.024574	-872458	FJD	
705	Boquerón, Paso	-53.437772	-70.525979	-889938	CHNM	Los Boquerones, Canal - Los Boquerones, Paso de
706	Maule, Canal	-53.441752	-73.886468	-891990	CHNM	
707	Silva Palma, Fiordo	-53.45	-71.766667	-901681	FJD	Silva Palma, Estuario
708	León, Fiordo del	-53.471874	-72.62922	-888877	FJD	León, Seno
709	Crooked Reach	-53.494307	-72.676976	-903144	CHNM	Tortuoso, Paso
710	Mucha Nieve, Ensenada de	-53.516094	-72.841413	-893636	FJD	Nevado, Estero - Nevado, Fiordo - Nevado, Seno
711	Geronimo, Canal	-53.531249	-72.373537	-885314	CHNM	Ierónimo, Rio de - Jerome - Jerónimo, Canal - Norues, Canal del
712	Acevedo, Canal	-53.532491	-72.929652	-871180	CHNM	Acevedo, Canalizo de
713	English Reach	-53.553056	-72.372607	-885026	CHNM	Inglés, Paso - English Narrows
714	Nieve, Estuario	-53.569986	-72.681042	-893683	FJD	Nieve, Fiordo - Nieve, Seno - Nieves, Seno - Nieves, Seno de las
715	David, Canal	-53.645823	-72.380093	-879398	CHNM	
716	Carreño, Canal	-53.67222	-73.573415	-875471	CHNM	
717	Ballena, Fiordo	-53.673621	-72.530213	-873036	FJD	Ballena, Seno
718	Choiseul, Bahía	-53.754834	-72.289754	-877147	FJD	Choisoul, Bahía
719	Smyth, Fiordo	-53.812409	-72.255193	-901776	FJD	Smyth, Seno
720	Dean, Bahía	-53.818067	-72.354644	-879407	FJD	Dean, Ensenada - Dean, Puerto
721	Helado, Fiordo	-53.835701	-72.405268	-884067	FJD	Helado, Seno - Icy, Seno
722	Famine, Paso	-53.839684	-70.945509	-883993	CHNM	Hambre, Paso del
723	San Miguel, Canal de	-53.885502	-72.222358	-900636	CHNM	San Miguel, Canal
724	Mellersh, Caleta	-53.896084	-71.953036	-892208	FJD	
725	Porvenir, Canal	-53.903167	-72.276876	-897075	CHNM	
726	Froward, Paso	-53.904742	-71.435979	-882890	CHNM	Froward Reach
727	Bell, Bahía	-53.933333	-71.8	-873447	FJD	Campana, Bahía
728	Wakefield, Paso	-53.952596	-73.38353	-904720	CHNM	Wakefield, Canal
729	Becerra, Estuario	-53.956736	-72.053823	-873427	FJD	Becerra, Fiordo - Becerra, Seno - Becerra, Estero
730	Spearing, Fiordo	-53.965248	-72.414144	-901969	FJD	Rojas Cellier, Seno
731	Colgrave, Estuario	-53.970805	-72.092862	-878731	FJD	Cotgrave, Estuario - Cotgrave, Fiordo - Cotgrave, Seno - Cotgrave, Estero
732	Mazareda, Bahía	-53.984831	-71.492376	-892043	FJD	Mazaredo, Bahía - Mazarredo, Bahía
733	Owen, Estero	-53.99218	-70.593376	-894480	FJD	Owen, Fiordo - Owen, Seno
734	Magdalena, Ensenada	-53.994446	-71.024478	-891262	SD	Magdalena, Seno
735	Wilson, Ensenada	-53.99968	-71.75358	-904847	FJD	
736	Lyell, Seno	-54.015635	-71.386687	-891140	SD	
737	Pedro, Canal	-54.027422	-71.669557	-895505	CHNM	Pedro, Seno - Acwalisnan, Seno
738	Sepúlveda, Seno	-54.039772	-72.520272	-901535	FJD	
739	Meskem, Canal	-54.051247	-70.483285	-892328	CHNM	
740	Elsa, Ensenada	-54.052928	-71.727406	-881679	FJD	
741	Lagreze, Paso	-54.060508	-72.361384	-886404	CHNM	
742	Silvester, Fiordo	-54.0641	-72.622245	-901686	FJD	
743	Dresden, Canal	-54.065978	-72.894068	-879937	FJD	Dresden, Fiordo - Dresden, Seno
744	George, Caleta	-54.078581	-71.705789	-883164	FJD	George, Ensenada - Jorge, Ensenada
745	González, Canal	-54.113345	-72.51115	-883261	CHNM	
746	Inman, Bahía	-54.116667	-71.133333	-885036	FJD	Inman, Seno
747	Gabriel, Canal	-54.128871	-70.843027	-882946	CHNM	
748	Staples, Seno	-54.139666	-71.197479	-901997	FJD	Staples, Ensenada
749	Arturo, Canal	-54.154758	-72.755548	-872655	CHNM	
750	Costabal, Seno	-54.158842	-72.395527	-878713	FJD	
751	Anicá, Canal	-54.166358	-70.376308	-872324	CHNM	
752	Brenton, Fiordo	-54.167682	-70.326945	-874060	SD	Brenton, Seno
753	Peje, Seno	-54.183333	-70.85	-895545	FJD	
754	Magallanes, Estrecho de	-54	-71	-891263	STRT	Magallanes, Magalhaen, Estrecho de - Magellan, Strait of - Magellan's Straits
755	Mónica, Seno	-54.205988	-71.592796	-892810	FJD	
756	Whiteside, Canal	-54.215818	-69.948619	-904805	CHNM	
757	Prat, Seno	-54.2	-71.45	-897245	FJD	
758	Vaccaro, Seno	-54.258915	-72.369542	-903906	CHNM	
759	Cascada, Canal	-54.260485	-70.492803	-875696	CHNM	
760	Leucotón, Canal	-54.266667	-72.466667	-888953	CHNM	
761	Mercurio, Seno	-54.270571	-71.275253	-892290	FJD	
762	Dyneley, Seno	-54.277692	-71.582381	-880035	SD	
763	Engaño, Canal	-54.285194	-71.515474	-882057	CHNM	
764	Andrade Taraba, Paso	-54.290813	-71.76841	-872251	CHNM	
765	Bárbara, Canal	-54.303987	-72.121447	-873170	CHNM	Bárbara, Estrecho - Jelouzell, Estrecho de
766	Keats, Fiordo	-54.304437	-70.681017	-885565	FJD	Keats, Seno
767	Aviador Ibáñez, Paso	-54.313205	-72.56832	-872845	CHNM	
768	Acwalisman, Canal	-54.316776	-71.59432	-871215	CHNM	Acwalisnan, Canal
769	Mortimer, Paso	-54.321884	-72.341196	-893056	CHNM	
770	Duntze, Seno	-54.322068	-71.765824	-879987	SD	
771	Transición, Bahía	-54.334569	-71.104618	-903302	FJD	
772	Milky, Paso	-54.345944	-72.700006	-904301	CHNM	Milky Way - Vía Láctea, Paso
773	Adelaida, Paso	-54.346412	-71.973485	-871233	CHNM	
774	Cockburn, Canal	-54.351782	-71.464855	-877584	CHNM	
775	Admiralty Sound	-54.361212	-69.352105	-871865	FJD	Almirantazgo, Fiordo - Almirantazgo, Seno
776	Sucio, Seno	-54.366667	-70.083333	-902071	FJD	
777	Melville, Seno	-54.377024	-72.328546	-892232	SD	
778	Ainsworth, Bahía	-54.390963	-69.575353	-871554	FJD	
779	Magdalena, Canal	-54.408163	-71.014372	-891252	CHNM	
780	Sargazos, Seno	-54.416473	-71.553574	-901293	FJD	
781	Broken, Bahia	-54.416667	-69.833333	-874098	FJD	Brookes, Bahía - Brooks, Bahía
782	Sur, Paso	-54.416667	-72.05	-902119	CHNM	
783	Águila, Paso	-54.4	-71.983333	-871512	CHNM	
784	Profundo, Seno	-54.4	-70.166667	-897288	FJD	
785	Bluff, Seno	-54.425433	-71.420915	-873794	FJD	
786	Skyring, Paso	-54.450391	-72.189847	-901761	CHNM	
787	Almirante Martinez, Seno	-54.45	-70.666667	-878372	FJD	Contra Almirante Martínez, Fiordo - Contraalmirante Martínez, Seno - Martínez, Seno
788	Furia, Paso	-54.459418	-72.358483	-882927	CHNM	
789	Agostini, Fiordo	-54.461042	-70.416488	-871263	FJD	Agostini, Seno
790	Brujo, Seno	-54.465587	-71.591214	-874115	FJD	
791	Magallanes, Seno	-54.483333	-70.933333	-891248	FJD	
792	Chico, Seno	-54.483914	-71.096679	-876866	FJD	
793	Chasco, Fiordo	-54.490893	-71.706331	-876673	FJD	Chasco, Seno
794	Ocasión, Canal	-54.515133	-72.060035	-893978	CHNM	
795	Hyatt, Fiordo	-54.527769	-70.201542	-884788	FJD	Hyatt, Seno
796	Parry, Bahía	-54.541918	-69.273765	-895257	FJD	
797	Sureste, Brazo	-54.55	-70.65	35252	FJD	
798	Serrano, Seno	-54.552471	-70.28491	-901558	FJD	
799	Brecknock, Canal	-54.566905	-72.070731	-874055	CHNM	Brecknock, Paso
800	Quo Vadis, Seno	-54.580676	-72.003872	-898589	FJD	
801	Mamá, Seno	-54.604229	-71.607223	-891509	FJD	
802	Aragay, Seno	-54.6	-71.666667	35198	FJD	
803	Puga, Seno	-54.695252	-70.821641	-897547	FJD	
804	Aguirre, Paso	-54.7	-71.55	35245	CHNM	
805	Alfredo, Seno	-54.725119	-70.917937	-871732	FJD	
806	Searle, Seno	-54.742158	-70.675397	-901415	FJD	
807	Unión, Canal	-54.75	-71.733333	35227	CHNM	
808	Occidental, Paso	-54.75	-71.5	-893982	CHNM	
809	Ventisquero, Seno	-54.754357	-70.278957	-904188	FJD	
810	Ballenero, Canal	-54.768049	-71.240152	-873057	CHNM	
811	Pratt, Paso	-54.76933	-71.895892	-897246	CHNM	
812	Garibaldi, Seno	-54.776127	-69.970191	-883065	FJD	
813	Oriental, Paso	-54.803817	-71.375337	-894353	CHNM	
814	Pía, Bahía	-54.80607	-69.662419	-896052	FJD	
815	Chair, Seno	-54.835129	-70.092587	-876384	FJD	
816	Pomar, Canal	-54.836138	-70.668915	-896954	CHNM	
817	Medio, Paso del	-54.866667	-70.266667	-892138	CHNM	
818	Occidental, Paso	-54.866667	-70.333333	-893983	CHNM	
819	Chico, Paso	-54.870907	-68.333951	-876856	CHNM	
820	Eclaireurs, Paso	-54.883333	-68.1	169657	CHNM	
821	Beagle, Canal	-54.883757	-69.96378	-893808	CHNM	Noroeste, Brazo - Norweste, Brazo
822	Este, Paso	-54.912351	-68.305976	-882421	CHNM	
823	Mackinlay, Paso	-54.916667	-67.483333	-1002728	CHNM	
824	O’Brien, Canal	-54.933703	-70.627927	-893948	CHNM	
825	Romanche, Bahía	-54.945637	-69.482782	-899600	FJD	
826	Adventure, Paso	-54.955892	-71.292001	-871249	CHNM	Aventura, Paso
827	Beagle, Canal	-54.975186	-69.116509	-873416	CHNM	Beagle Channel
828	Murray, Canal	-54.984653	-68.351198	-893190	CHNM	Murray, Estrecho
829	Tres Amigos, Canal	-55.029012	-70.173663	-903374	CHNM	
830	Picton, Paso	-55.030549	-67.068924	-896225	CHNM	
831	Occidental, Paso	-55.033333	-70	-893984	CHNM	
832	Penhoat, Bahía	-55.054566	-69.361392	-895747	FJD	Penhoat, Estero - Penhoat, Seno
833	Louisa, Seno	-55.055396	-70.580761	-891090	FJD	Luisa, Estrecho - Luisa, Seno
834	Escondido, Seno	-55.066667	-70.6	-882225	FJD	
835	Barros Merino, Canal	-55.071898	-70.01676	-873299	CHNM	
836	Sudoeste, Brazo	-55.099721	-70.004547	-902076	CHNM	
837	Fouque, Bahia	-55.118945	-69.533429	-882783	FJD	Fouqué, Estero - Fouque, Fiordo
838	Ponsonby, Seno	-55.133161	-68.385023	-896978	FJD	
839	Oglander, Bahía	-55.150779	-66.957863	-894193	SD	
840	Canacus, Canal	-55.185075	-68.329499	-874950	CHNM	
841	Isaza, Paso	-55.223147	-67.957282	-885122	CHNM	
842	La Monneraye, Estero	-55.224873	-69.225865	-886939	FJD	Monneraye, Estero - Monneraye, Fiordo
843	Webb, Seno	-55.244532	-69.607001	-904759	FJD	Webb, Estero
844	Carfort, Canal	-55.250347	-68.916094	-875337	FJD	
845	Micalvi, Paso	-55.260791	-67.959205	-892369	CHNM	
846	Lajarte, Canal	-55.281242	-69.390568	-886677	CHNM	Lajarte, Estero
847	Richmond, Paso	-55.302474	-66.711287	-899169	CHNM	
848	Goree, Canal	-55.322897	-67.123169	-883299	CHNM	Goree, Paso - Goree, Rada de
849	Talbot, Canal	-55.327865	-69.851565	-902282	CHNM	
850	Hahn, Canal	-55.330447	-68.872644	-883979	FJD	
851	Christmas, Seno	-55.336597	-69.891738	-895283	CHNM	Navidad, Seno - Pascua, Estrecho - Pascua, Seno
852	Año Nuevo, Seno	-55.344896	-69.05454	-872355	SD	
853	Doze, Bahía	-55.379473	-68.823318	-879931	FJD	Doze, Estero - Doze, Estuario
854	Luisa, Bahía	-55.466667	-68.783333	-891085	FJD	
855	Rous, Seno	-55.473089	-69.317603	-899744	FJD	
856	Romanche, Canal	-55.476705	-68.687442	-899601	CHNM	
857	Norte, Paso	-55.482814	-67.648497	-893830	CHNM	
858	Coralie, Caleta	-55.49603	-68.640444	-878473	FJD	
859	Victoria, Canal	-55.616083	-67.643288	-904333	CHNM	
860	Washington, Canal	-55.684289	-67.576801	-904755	CHNM	
861	Franklin, Canal	-55.744991	-67.745997	-882830	CHNM	
862	Bravo, Canal	-55.787616	-67.261483	-874028	CHNM	
863	Franklin, Seno	-55.794113	-67.683952	-882831	SD	
864	Oriental, Paso	-55.808079	-67.489881	-894354	CHNM	
865	Arquista, Bahia	-55.80866	-67.177924	-872616	SD	Arquistade, Bahía
866	Norte, Paso	-55.811874	-67.507342	-893831	CHNM	
867	San Francisco, Bahía	-55.870769	-67.373904	-900298	SD	
868	Al Mar del Sur, Paso	-55.886065	-67.172252	-891763	CHNM	Mar del Sur, Paso al

== See also ==
- List of islands of Chile
- Drake Passage
- Guía Narrows
- Primera Angostura
- Segunda Angostura
