= Brunswick Peninsula =

Geographic area in Chile

Coordinates: 53°30′S 71°25′W

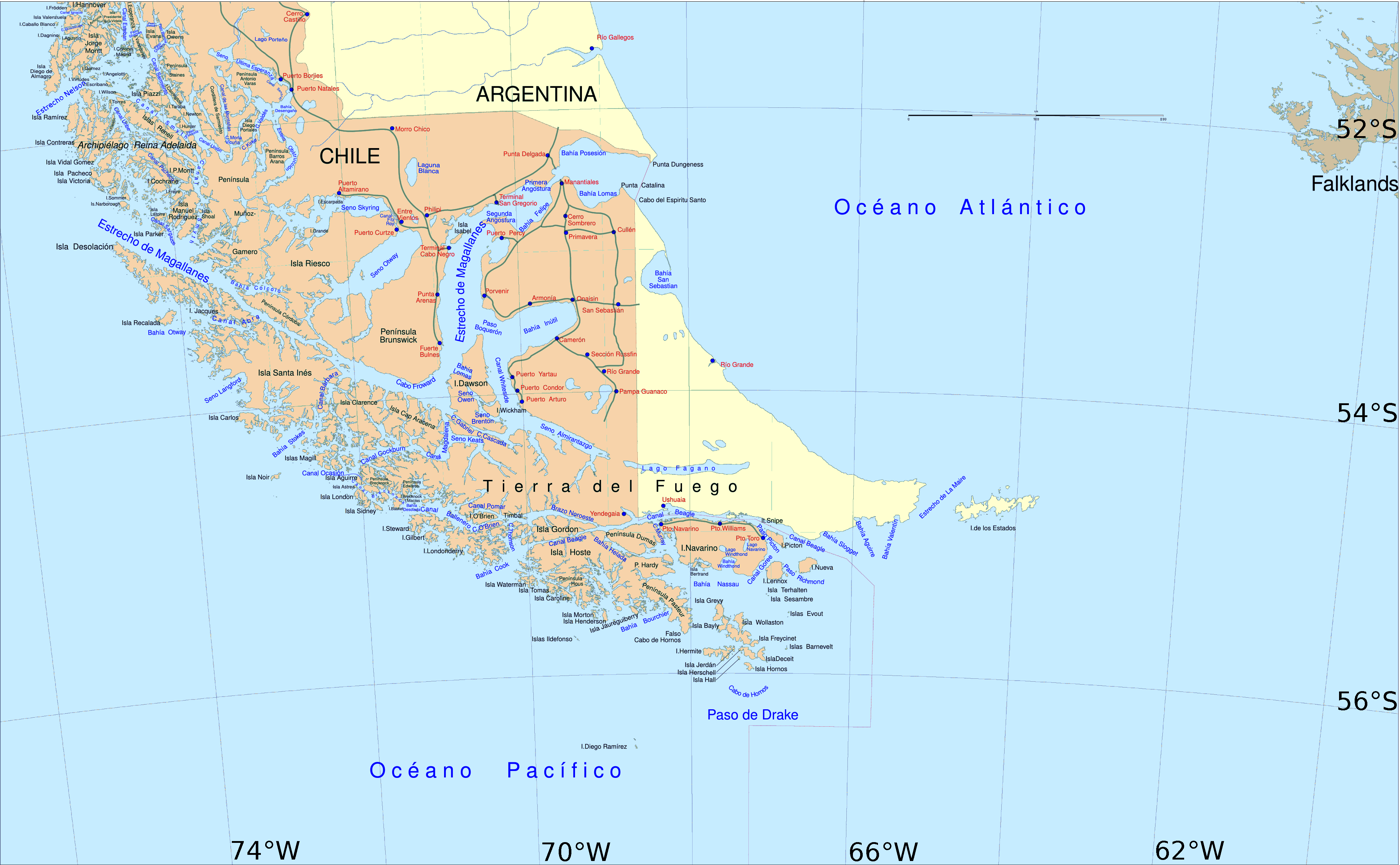
Brunswick peninsula, the southernmost part of the American mainland

Brunswick Peninsula (Spanish: Península de Brunswick) is a large peninsula in Magallanes y la Antártica Region, Patagonia, Chile.

== Geography ==
The Brunswick Peninsula is triangular in shape, joined to the mainland in the north by a 16-kilometre-wide (9.9 mi) isthmus. It widens to almost 80 kilometres (50 mi) in the south. The Strait of Magellan defines the eastern and southern limits while the Otway Sound (Seno Otway) delimits its western shores. It measures 115 kilometres (71 mi) in length from the base to Cape Froward, the southernmost point of the American mainland. This yields an area of more than 6,300 square kilometres (2,400 sq mi).

== Origin of name ==
Brunswick is a city, and former duchy in Germany. It was the seat of the Principality of Brunswick-Wolfenbüttel. In 1815 Frederick William, Duke of Brunswick-Wolfenbüttel, nephew of Britain's George III, joined the Duke of Wellington in the Quatre Bras Battle against Napoleon Bonaparte and was killed in battle. In his honor, English explorers gave the name Brunswick to the newly charted land of South America.

== Settlement ==
The only city in the Peninsula is Punta Arenas, the regional capital. It is located on the northeast coast and near the Straits of Magellan. The area is thinly populated with all settlements clustered on the east coast but the entire peninsula is treated as a single administrative unit, the commune (municipality) of Punta Arenas.

The commune also includes all islands west of the Isla Grande de Tierra del Fuego and north of Cockburn and Magdalena channels. These are mostly uninhabited and among them are: Isla Capitán Aracena, Clarence Island (south), Desolación Island, and Dawson Island (southeast). To the northwest, the peninsula borders the commune of Laguna Blanca, and in the northeast, San Gregorio.
