= Riesco Island =

Island of Chile

Native name: Isla Riesco
- Location within Southern Patagonia

Geography
- Location: Zona Austral
- Coordinates: 52°54′S 72°10′W
- Area: 5,110 km^{2} (1,970 sq mi)
- Highest elevation: 1,830 m (6000 ft)
- Highest point: Mount Atalaya

Administration
- Chile
- Region: Magallanes
- Province: Magallanes
- Commune: Río Verde

Demographics
- Population: 156

Additional information
- NGA UFI=-899178

Riesco Island (Spanish: Isla Riesco) lies at west of the Brunswick Peninsula, Chile. It is one of the largest islands in Chile, with an area of 5,110 square kilometres (1,970 sq mi). Its highest point is Mount Atalaya at 1,830 metres (6,000 ft). The island is bordered by two large piedmont embayments: Otway Sound and Skyring Sound. The narrow Fitzroy Channel connects both bodies of water and separates the island from mainland Patagonia. The island is separated from the southern part of the Muñoz Gamero Peninsula by another narrow channel, the Geronimo Channel.

Riesco Island hosts Chile's largest known coal reserves, with mining activities dating back to 1880. There were the mines Magdalena, Elena and Josefina. In 1940 Magdalena and Josefina produced 100,000 tons. It is thought to contain more than 300 million tonnes of low-quality coal in three deposits located in the colonized portion of the island: Río Eduardo, Elena and Estancia Invierno.

Numerous glaciers can be found on other parts of the island. In the northwest, an icefield is the source of 7 glaciers and Cerro Ladrillero has 12 glaciers on its slopes. In the southwestern portion of the island, Córdova Peninsula marks the eastern limit of the Strait of Magellan and is home to several mountain glaciers.
