= Seno Otway =

Coordinates: 52°53′S 71°07′W

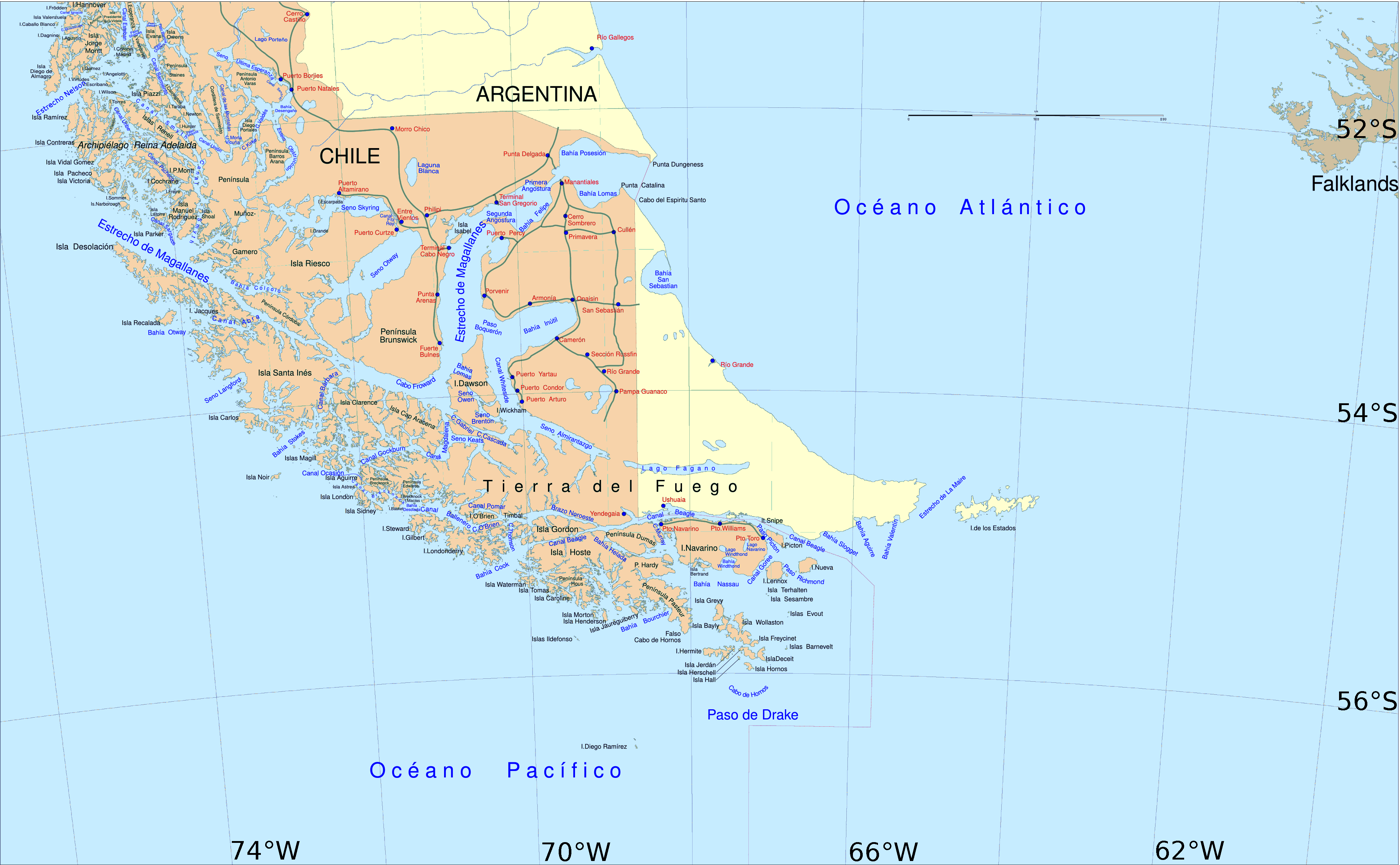

Click on the image to obtain the big map

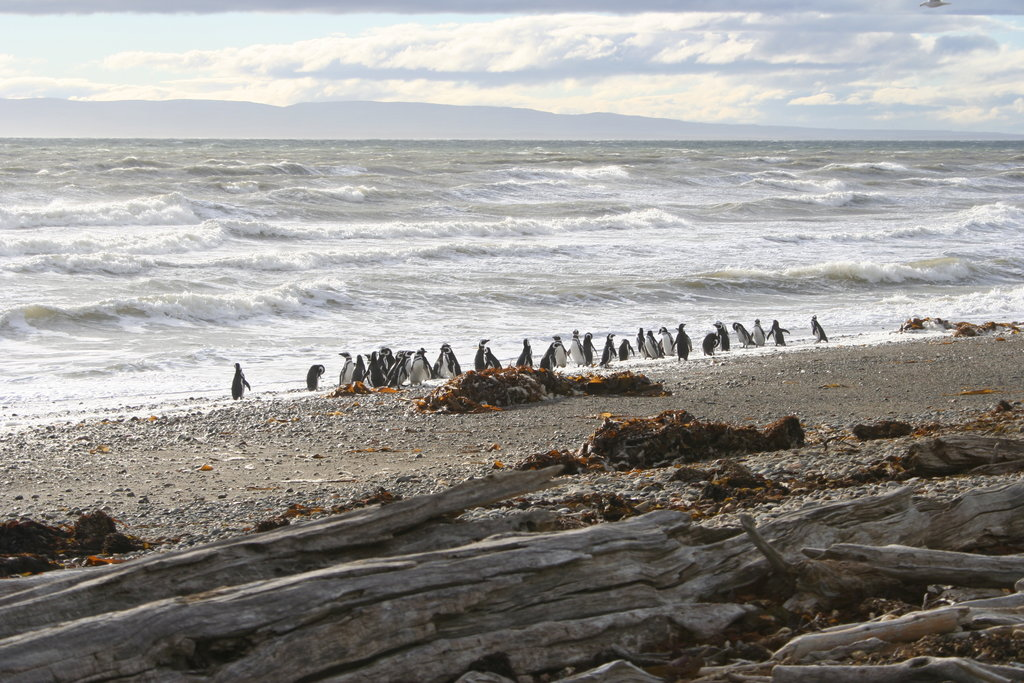
Seno Otway Magellanic penguin colony

Seno Otway is a large inland sound lying between Brunswick Peninsula and Riesco Island in southern Chile. Alternatively called Otway Sound, this natural waterway occupies a valley blocked by a large terminal moraine left by the retreat of a glacier during the last glacial period. In spite of being located east of the Andes, it is connected to the open Pacific Ocean through the Strait of Magellan via a narrow passage, which cuts into the Andean Massif. Seno Otway also is hydrologically connected with Seno Skyring by the Fitzroy Channel.

== Ecology ==
There are a variety of marine species within the Otway Sound, as well as along the coastal terrestrial and intertidal zones. Notably there is a moderately large colony of the Magellanic penguin along the coast of the Seno Otway.

Not to be confused with Otway Bay at the west entrance of the Abra Channel.

== See also ==
- Fjords and channels of Chile
