= Cockburn Channel =

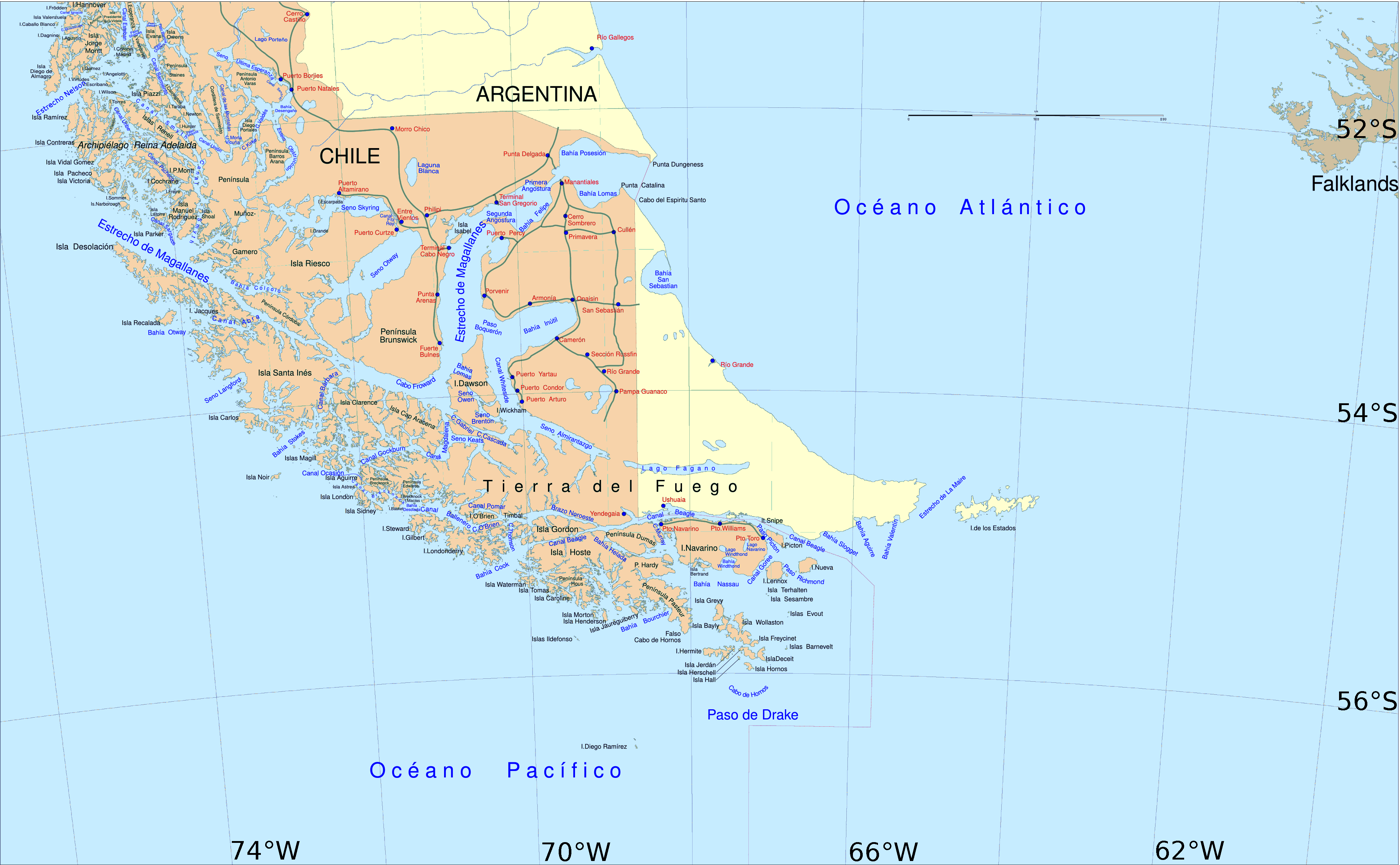
- The islands and channels at the west entrance of the Strait of Magellan: Cockburn, Magdalena, and Barbara Channels

- Location within Chile
- Location: South America
- Coordinates: 54°20′S 71°30′W
- Basin countries: Chile
- Max. length: 40 km (25 mi)

The Cockburn Channel (Spanish: Canal Cockburn) is a channel that separates the Brecknock Peninsula, which is the westernmost projection of the Isla Grande de Tierra del Fuego, from Clarence Island, Capitán Aracena Island and other minor islands in Chile. It is located at 54°20′S 71°30′W and extends 40 miles (64 km) east from the open Pacific Ocean to Magdalena Channel. The channel is part of a major waterway connecting the Strait of Magellan to the Beagle Channel: Magdalena Channel, Cockburn Channel, Brednock Pass, Ballenero Channel, Beagle Channel.

Cockburn Channel and the Bárbara Channel have the same entrance into the Pacific, but it runs in an easterly direction along the south side of Clarence Island for 40 miles and into Magdalen Sound in Magellan Strait. In working through this passage the south shore ought to be preferred, as it is usually a weather shore, and it seems to be better provided with coves and inlets in which a vessel may find it convenient to anchor. Two rocks are plainly visible above water in the entrance to Cockburn Channel. One rock lies about 10.5 miles 168° from Mount Skyring and appears to be identical with Leon Rock, which is shown on the charts. The other lies northeastward of Tussac Rocks, about 7.5 miles 171° from Mount Skyring.
