= Clarence Island, Chile =

Island in the Magallanes Region, Chile

Clarence Island
Native name: Isla Clarence
- Location within Southern Patagonia

Geography
- Coordinates: 54°10′S 71°50′W
- Archipelago: Tierra del Fuego
- Adjacent to: Pacific Ocean
- Area: 1,111 km^{2} (429 sq mi)

Administration
- Chile
- Region: Magallanes Region
- Province: Magallanes Province
- Communes of Chile: Punta Arenas

Demographics
- Population: 5 ()

Additional information
- NGA UFI -877469

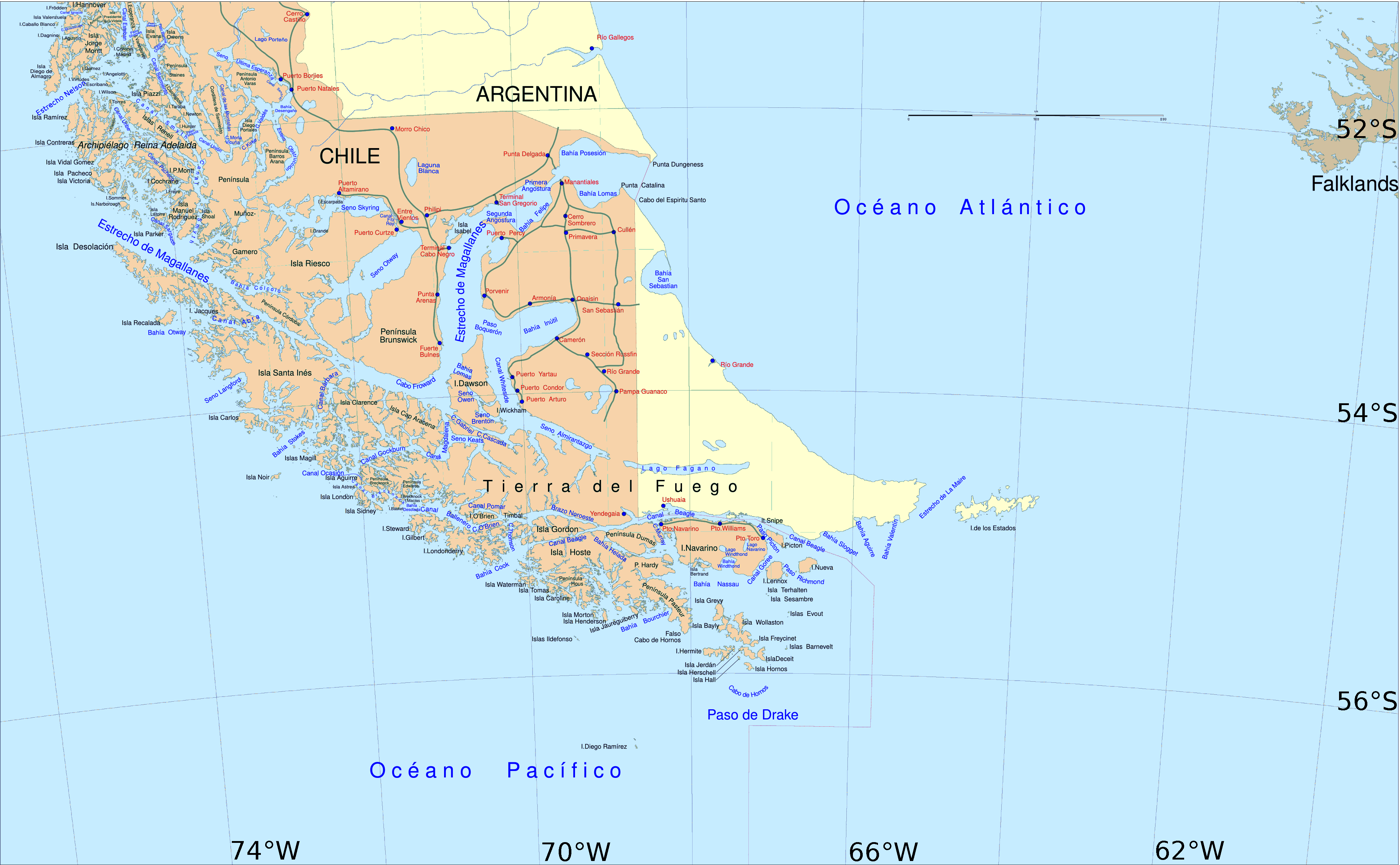

Clarence Island (Spanish: Isla Clarence) is a Chilean island in the Magallanes Region. It belongs to the Tierra del Fuego archipelago and to the municipality of Punta Arenas. It is located just south of Brunswick Peninsula (on the south side of Froward Reach).

Clarence Island extends from Magdalena Channel and Cockburn Channel to Bárbara Channel; and the whole length of its northern coast is indented by sounds stretching deeply into the island.

== Literature ==
- United States Hydrographic Office, South America Pilot (1916)
