= Canal Whiteside =

Channel in southern Chile

Coordinates: 53°55′S 70°15′W

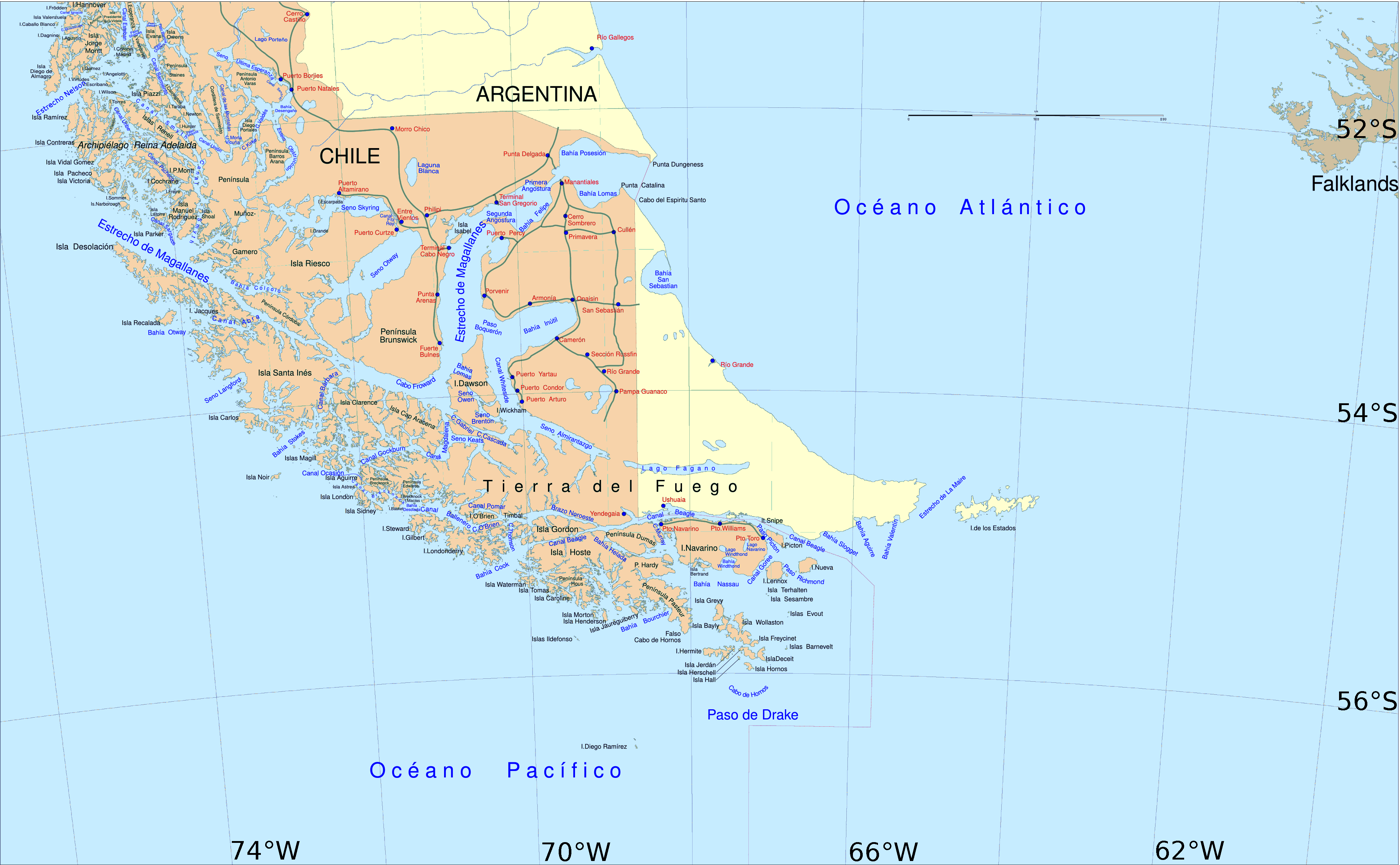

Canal Whiteside between Dawson Island and Tierra del Fuego.

Canal Whiteside or Whiteside Channel is a channel in southern Chile, between Dawson Island (to the west) and Isla Grande de Tierra del Fuego (to the east). It runs from the southern tip of Inútil Bay to Almirantazgo Fjord. It is clear of dangers and deep; the eastern shore, which is low and fronted with shallow water, should not be approached within one mile; the western shore has no known dangers off-lying, and may be approached to a distance of about 1/4 mile.

The channel is named after Arturo Whiteside, a Chilean cartographer who, in 1904, explored the zone.

== See also ==
- Fjords and channels of Chile
- List of fjords, channels, sounds and straits of Chile
