= Seno Skyring =

Coordinates: 52°37′12″S 71°54′00″W

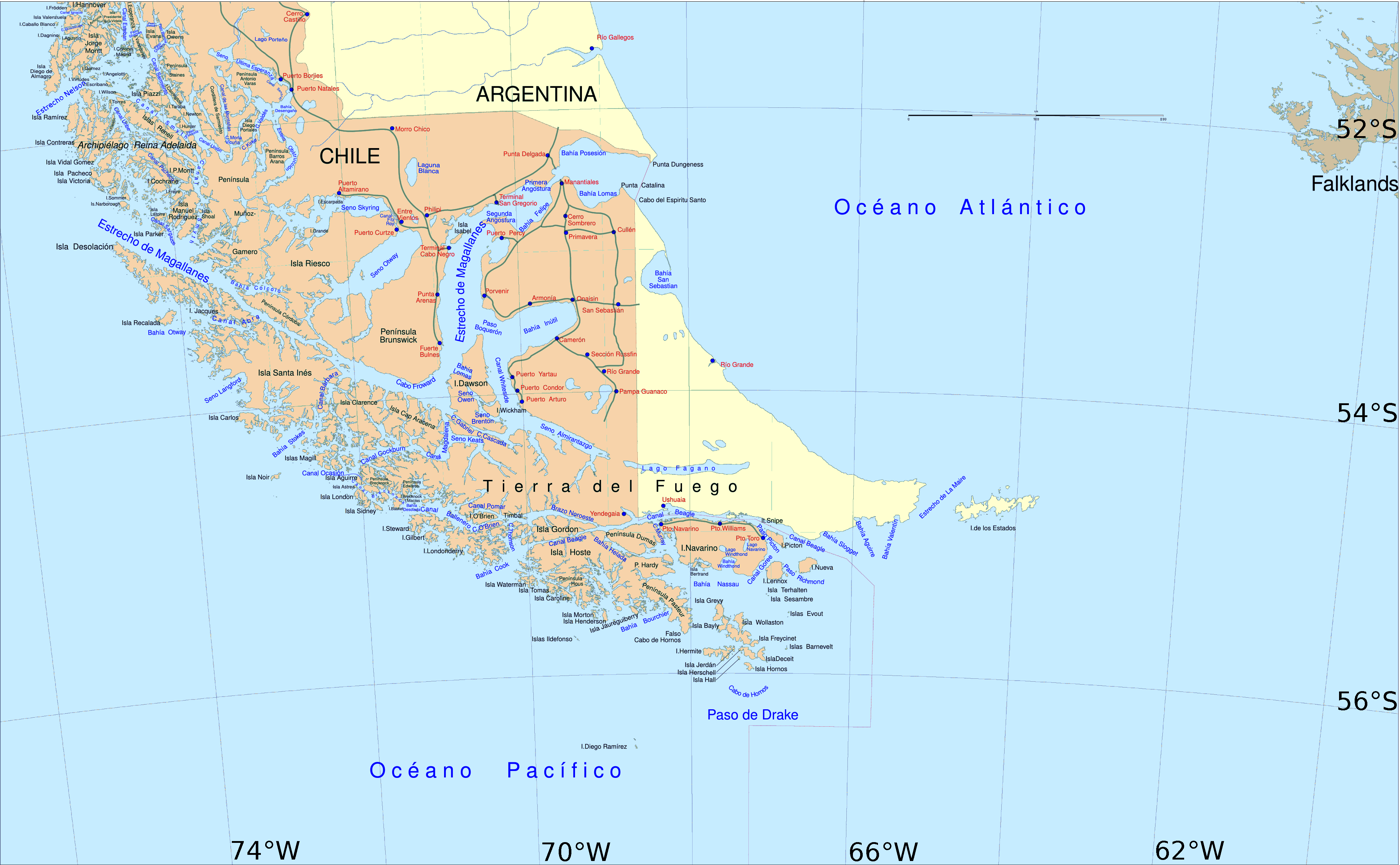

Click on the image to obtain the big map

Seno Skyring is a large inland sound lying north of Riesco Island and south of mainland South America in southern Chile. Alternatively called Skyring Sound, this natural waterway occupies a valley blocked by a large terminal moraine left by the retreat of a glacier during the last glacial period. In spite of being located east of the Andes, it is connected to the western, Pacific end of the Strait of Magellan through fjords that cut into the Andean Massif. Seno Skyring is also hydrologically connected with Seno Otway via the Fitzroy Channel. It measures approximately 50 mi (80 km) at its longest axis, which is oriented in an east–west direction, and averages between 8 mi (13 km) and 10 mi (16 km) wide.

The eastern portion of the sound is surrounded by low, undulating countryside with scarce trees, while its western portion is characterized by a rugged coastline deeply indented by fjords and bays, and dotted with a number of islands.
