= Bárbara Channel =

Channel connecting the Magellan Strait to the Pacific Ocean

Coordinates: 54.20°S 72.121447°W

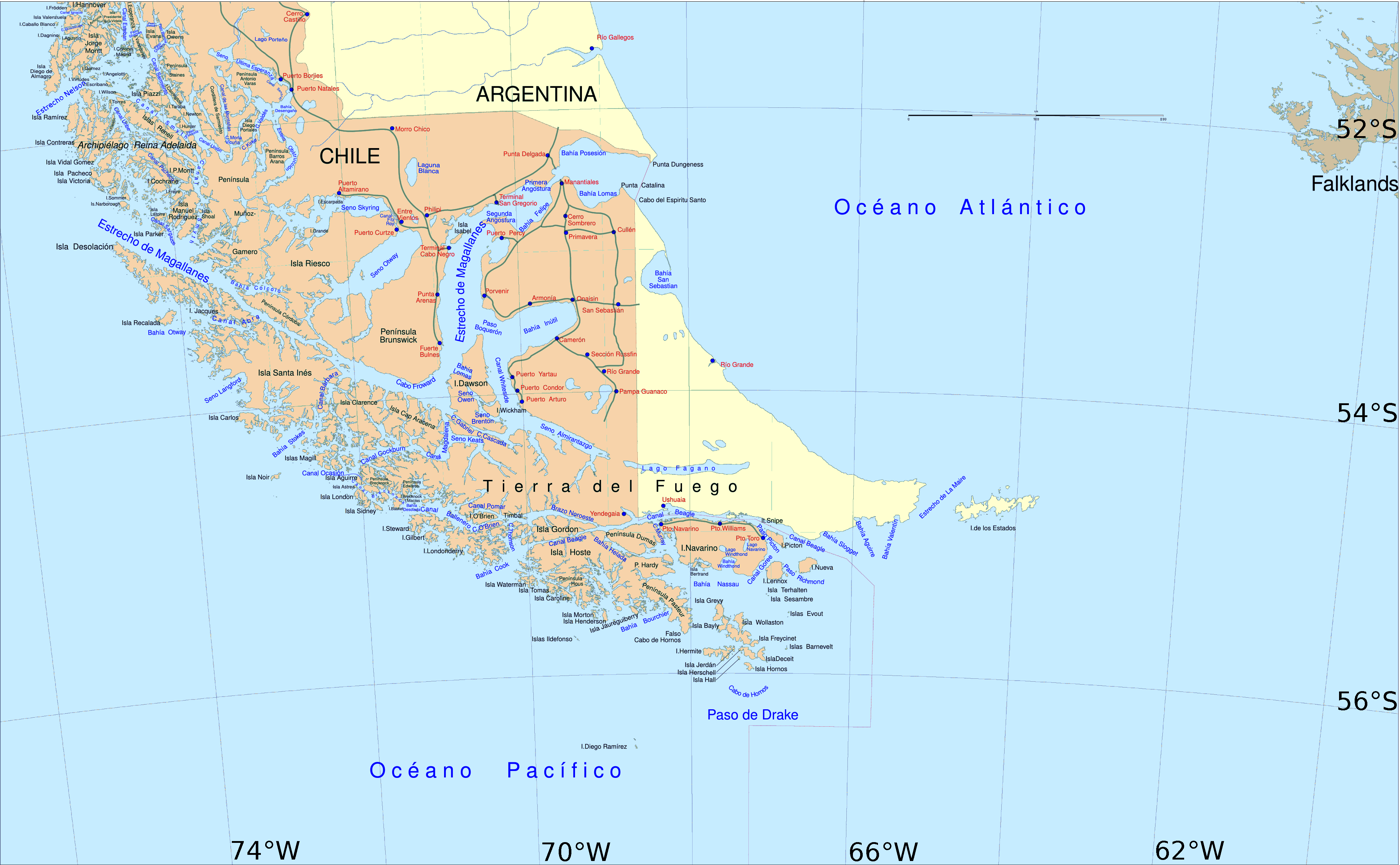
The islands and channels at the west entrance of the Strait of Magellan: Cockburn and Magdalena, centre right, and the Bárbara Channel to the NW

Bárbara Channel (Spanish Canal Bárbara) is one of the three channels which connects Magellan Strait with the Pacific Ocean (Others are Abra Channel and Magdalena Channel). It is located between the Santa Inés Island and the Clarence Island and ends at the Otway Bay, having the same entrance into the Pacific as Cockburn Channel, runs in a north direction along the west side of Clarence Island.

The United States Hydrographic Office, South America Pilot (1916) states:

Barbara Channel, leading into Magellan Strait at English Reach, has its southern entrance so encumbered with islands and rocks that no one direct channel can be specially recommended, and the chart must be referred to as the best guide for its navigation. For small vessels there is neither danger nor difficulty; and there are numerous anchorages that they may reach without trouble. The rocks off the entrance of this channel should be passed only during daylight and in clear weather, so that a vessel may be steered more by a good eye at the masthead than by any chart. Four remarkable mountains point out the entrance distinctly. The peaks on Kempe Island are high and show three points. The peaks on Fury Island are high and divided. Mount Skyring is high and has a single peak. Mount St. Paul, from near Fury Island, appears like the dome of the cathedral, the name of which it bears. The Channel separates Clarence Island from Santa Ines, the next large island west of it, and is about 38 miles long from Magill Islands in the Pacific to Charles Islands in Magellan Strait. Hewett Bay is the first anchorage on the western shore of the southern entrance of Barbara Channel; there is anchorage in 9 fathoms in its north part. The anchorage is smaller than shown on the chart Between Hewett and Nort Bay the channel is so strewed with rocks and shoals, some only showing at half tide, that much caution is necessary in its navigation; all patches of kelp should be avoided. A submerged rock lies about ) mile 158 from the islet located between Mortimer Island and the island eastward of Hewett Bay. The tidal currents are much stronger to the northward of Nort Bay than to the southward. The country hereabouts has a more agreeable appearance, being better wooded with beech and cypress trees.

== See also ==
- List of islands of Chile
- List of fjords, channels, sounds and straits of Chile
