= Magdalena Channel =

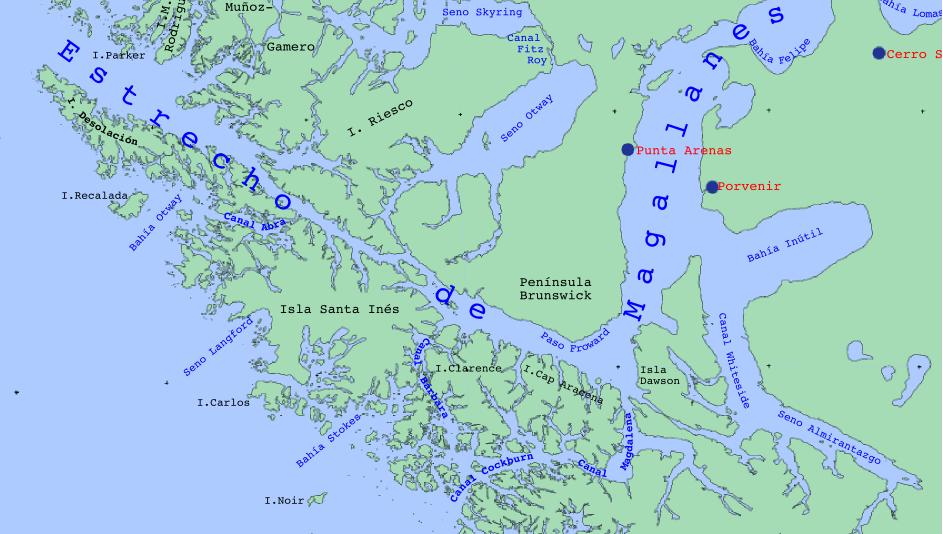
The islands and channels at the west entrance of the Strait of Magellan: Cockburn, Magdalena, Whiteside and Barbara Channels

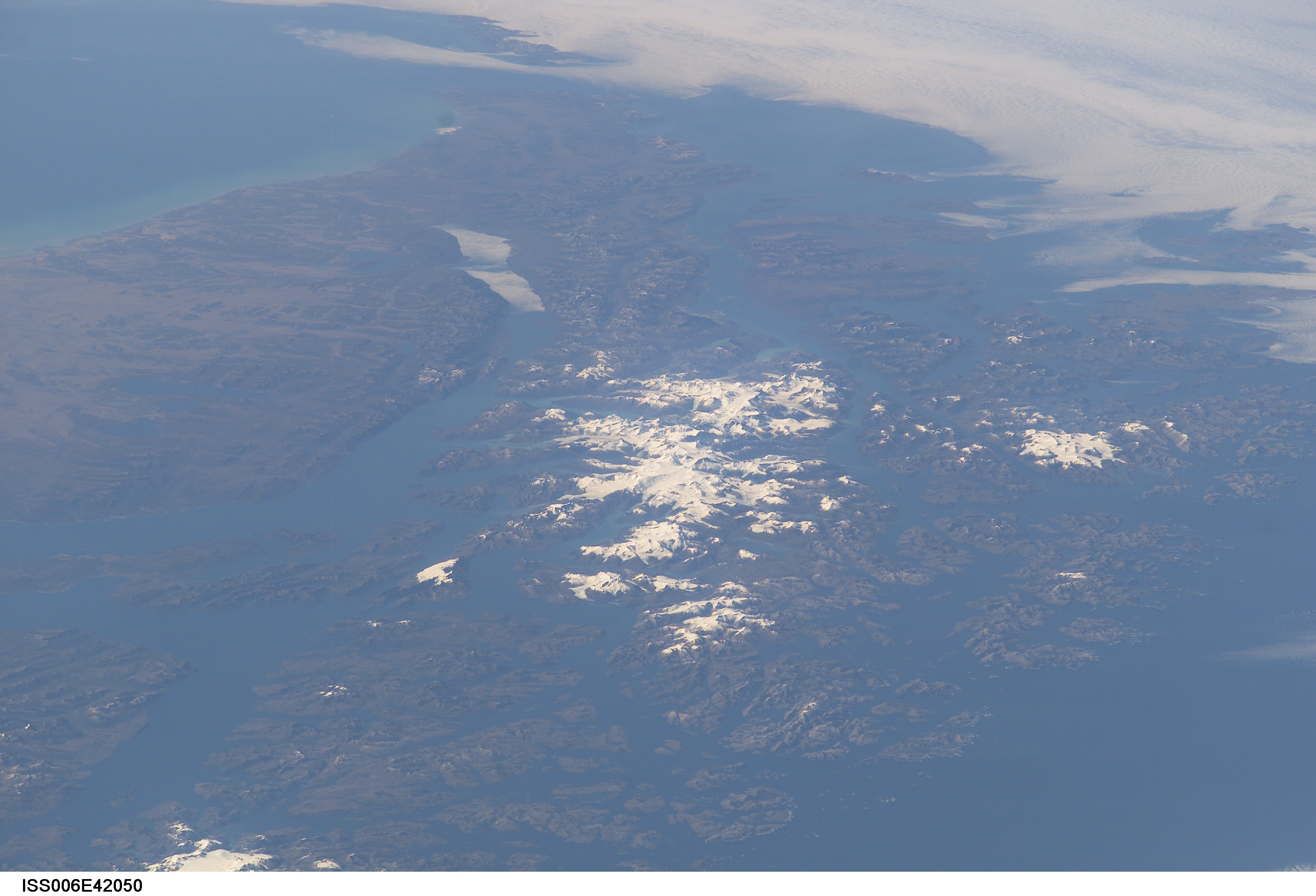
The channel is visible in the lower left corner.

Magdalena Channel (Spanish: Canal Magdalena) is a Chilean channel joining the Strait of Magellan with the Cockburn Channel and is part of a major navigation route which ultimately connects with the Beagle Channel. It separates Capitán Aracena Island from the westernmost portion of Isla Grande de Tierra del Fuego, and crosses Alberto de Agostini National Park. It is flanked by mountains, the chief of which is Monte Sarmiento. Like the Abra Channel and the Bárbara Channel farther west, it joins the western part of the Strait of Magellan directly to the Pacific Ocean.

It is located at 54°15′S 70°55′W.

== See also ==
- Fjords and channels of Chile
- List of fjords, channels, sounds and straits of Chile
- List of islands of Chile
