= Abra Channel =

Channel

Coordinates: 53.383333°S 73.416667°W

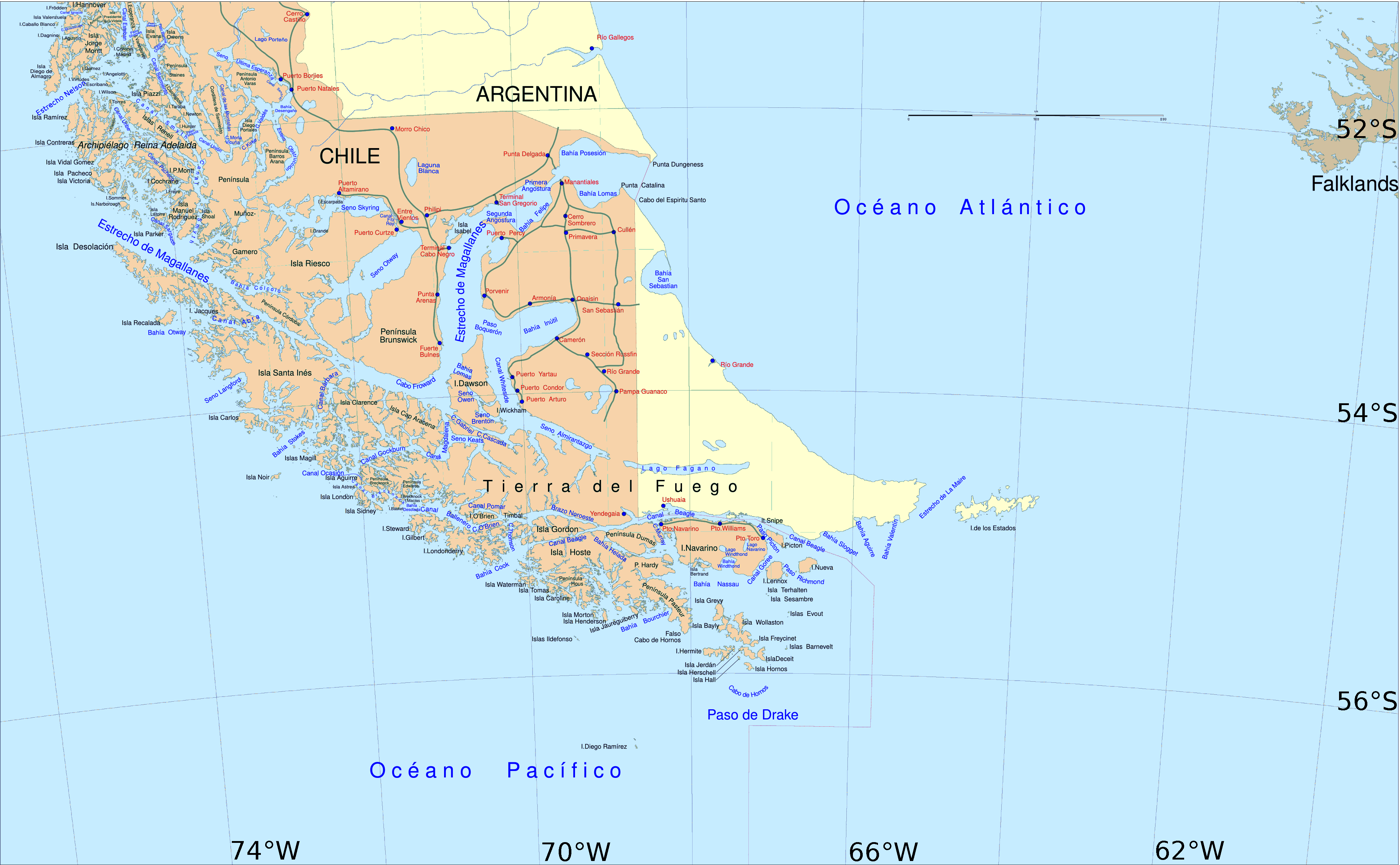

Abra Channel at the west entrance of the Strait of Magellan. Click on the image to obtain the big map

Abra Channel (Spanish Canal Abra, formerly Sea Shell Channel) is one of the three channels which connect Magellan Strait with the Pacific Ocean (Others are Bárbara Channel and Magdalena Channel). It is located between the Santa Inés Island and the Jacques Island and ends at the Otway Bay. An incomplete examination by the Sylvia showed it to be a fine navigable passage, but no anchorages were found. It may possibly be of service to a vessel embayed in Otway Bay, enabling her to run into the strait. Abra Island, which stands in the center of the eastern entrance, is 300 feet high and covered with vegetation. The entrance is 2 miles wide, but it soon narrows to 1 mile.

A rock with a depth of 1.5 fathoms on it, and well marked with kelp, lies in the fairway of Abra Channel, with center of Maycock Island bearing 305°, distant 0,75 mile, and summit of Francis Island 32°.

Pedro Sarmiento de Gamboa wrote:

We called it the opening (Abra) because we can't see its termination.
