= Aracena Island =

Island in Chile

Native name: Isla Aracena
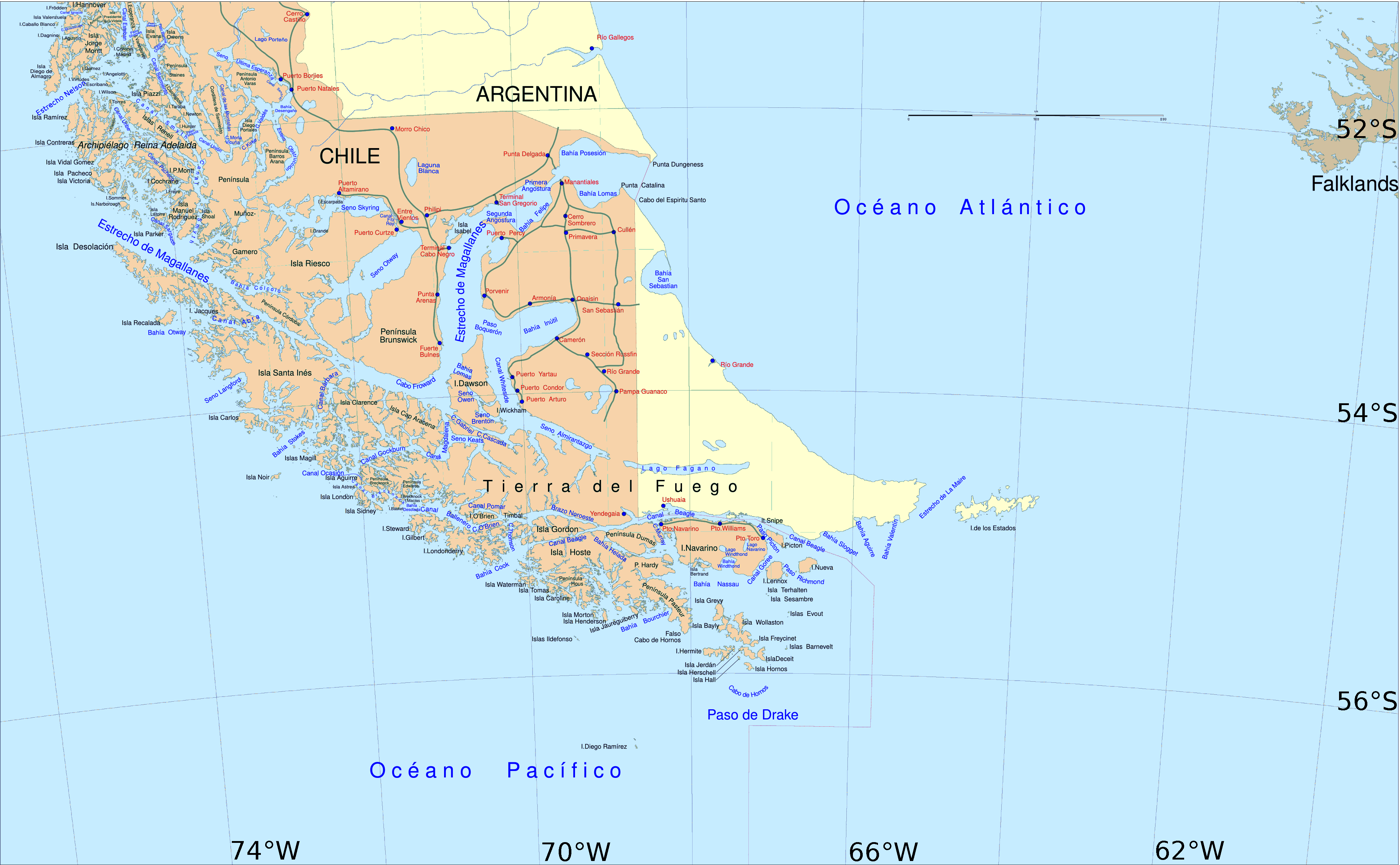
- Aracena Island, at the Strait of Magellan

Geography
- Coordinates: 54°10′S 71°20′W
- Area: 1,164 km^{2} (449 sq mi)
- Coastline: 457 km (284 mi)
- Highest elevation: 1,158 m (3799 ft)
- Highest point: Monte Vernal

Administration
- Chile
- Region: Magallanes Region
- Province: Magallanes Province
- Communes of Chile: Punta Arenas

Additional information
- NGA UFI -875166

Aracena Island (Spanish: Isla Capitán Aracena or Isla Aracena) is an island in the Magallanes Region of Chile. It belongs to the Tierra del Fuego archipelago, and forms part of the Alberto de Agostini National Park.

For some 6000 years the coastal areas of Aracena Island have been inhabited by the Alacalufe (or Kawésqar) people. By the early years of the 21st century, the continued presence of the Alacalufe has been put seriously at risk by the actions of non-indigenous people.

The highest point on Aracena Island is Mount Vernal. (The United States Hydrographic Office in South America Pilot (Year 1916, page 316) erroneously located Mount Vernal on the Clarence Island.)
