= Fitzroy Channel =

Strait in southern Chile

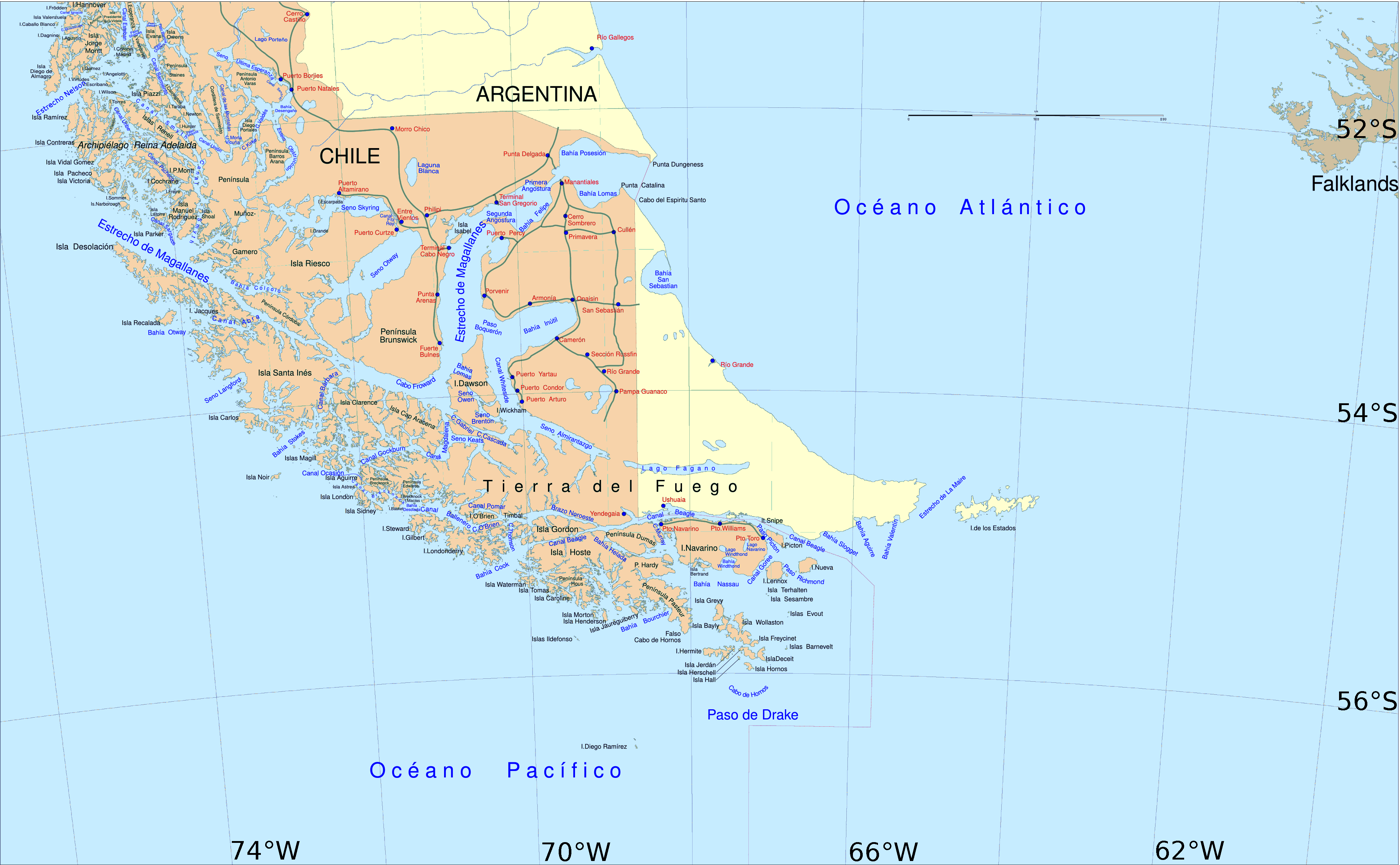

Click on the image to obtain the big map

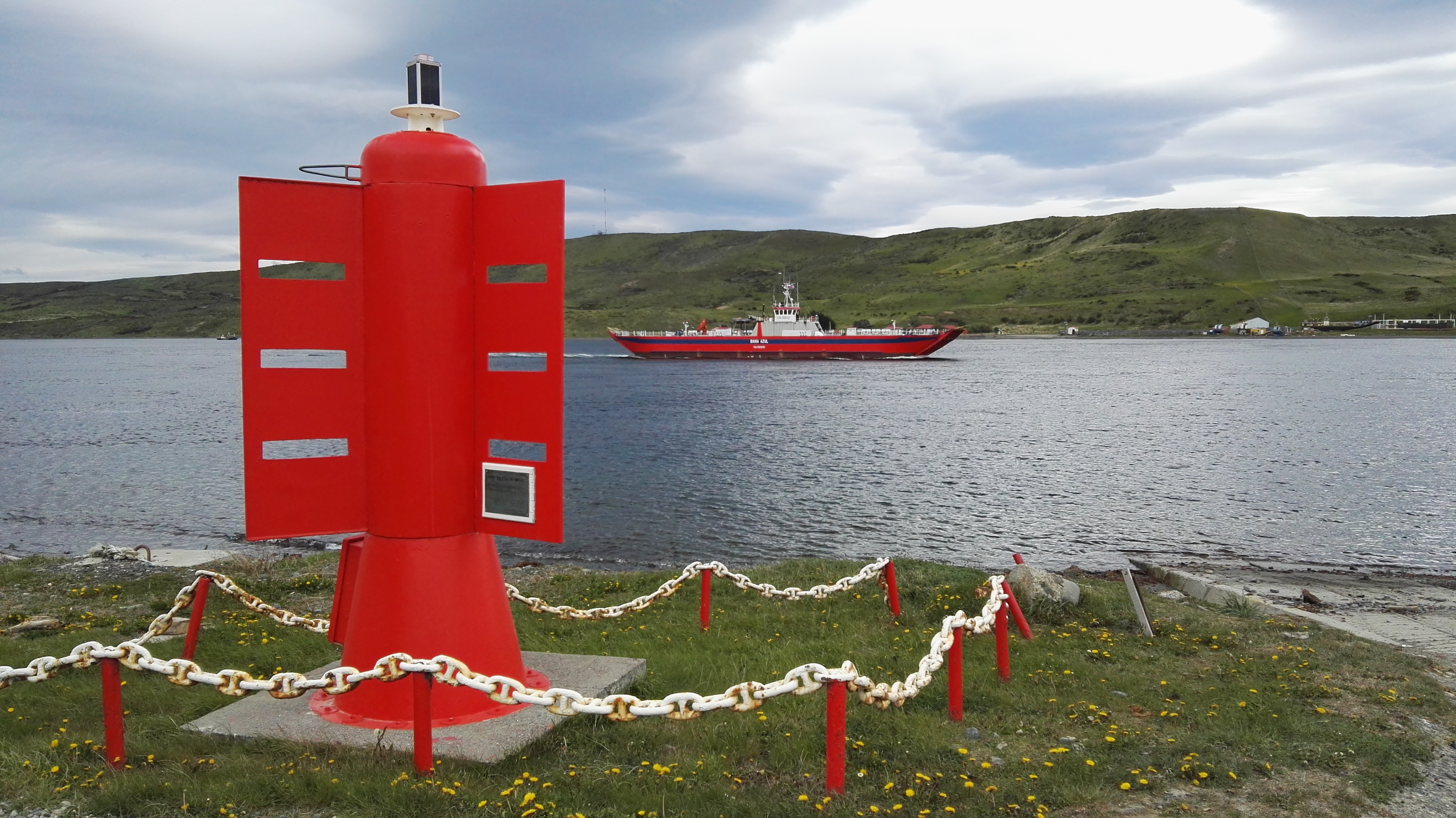
Ferry at Fitzroy Channel

The Fitzroy Channel is a river in the Magallanes y la Antártica Chilena Region in southern Chile.
