= List of lighthouses in Chile =

In order to mark dangerous coastlines, hazardous shoals, reefs, safe entries to harbors the Chilean authorities maintain 650 lighthouses from the boundary to Peru until the Atlantic Ocean. Information on these lighthouses is presented in the following separate lists that follow the shoreline from North to South as provided by the United States' National Geospatial-Intelligence Agency (NGA). The NGA lists also 26 Argentine lighthouses in the Beagle Channel zone as part of the Chilean list of lights. This NGA list does, however, not include the lighthouses in the lakes of Chile nor any Chilean lighthouses in Antarctica (see List of Antarctic and subantarctic islands).

- From Arica to Caldera (including Easter Island): 87 lighthouses
- From Huasco to San Antonio: 97 lighthouses
- From Punta Tocopalma to Bahía Corral (including Juan Fernández Islands): 87 lighthouses
- From Chacao Channel to Dalcahue Channel: 87 lighthouses
- From Gulf of Corcovado to Darwin Channel: 76 lighthouses
- From Messier Channel to Smyth Channel: 90 lighthouses
- From Strait of Magellan to Paso Picton: 105 lighthouses

== Content ==
Information is tabulated in seven columns as follows:

- Numbers assigned to each light, RACON or RAMARK by NGA and Admiralty. RACONs and RAMARKs located at a light are listed with the light. Those not located at a light are assigned separate numbers.
- Name and descriptive location of the light or buoy, RACON or RAMARK. This column is intended to describe the location of the navigational aid and to distinguish it from others in proximity. They can indicate the following: lights intended for landfall or having a visibility (range) of 15 miles or more; floating aids; lightships and LANBYs; all other lights not mentioned above.
- Latitude and longitude (approx.) of a navigational aid to the nearest tenth of a minute, intended to facilitate chart orientation (use column 2 and the appropriate chart for precise positioning).
- Characteristics of light, buoy, RACON or RAMARK characteristic (see Characteristics of Lights chart for explanation of lights).
- Height of light in feet and in meter, and range, the distance, expressed in nautical miles, that a light can be seen in clear weather or that a RACON or RAMARK can be received.
- Description of the structure
- Height of the structure in feet
- Remarks – sectors, fog signals, radar reflectors, minor lights close by, radiobeacons, storm signals, signal stations, radio direction finders, and other pertinent information.

== See also ==
- Lists of lighthouses
- Lighthouses in Chile
