= Greater La Serena =

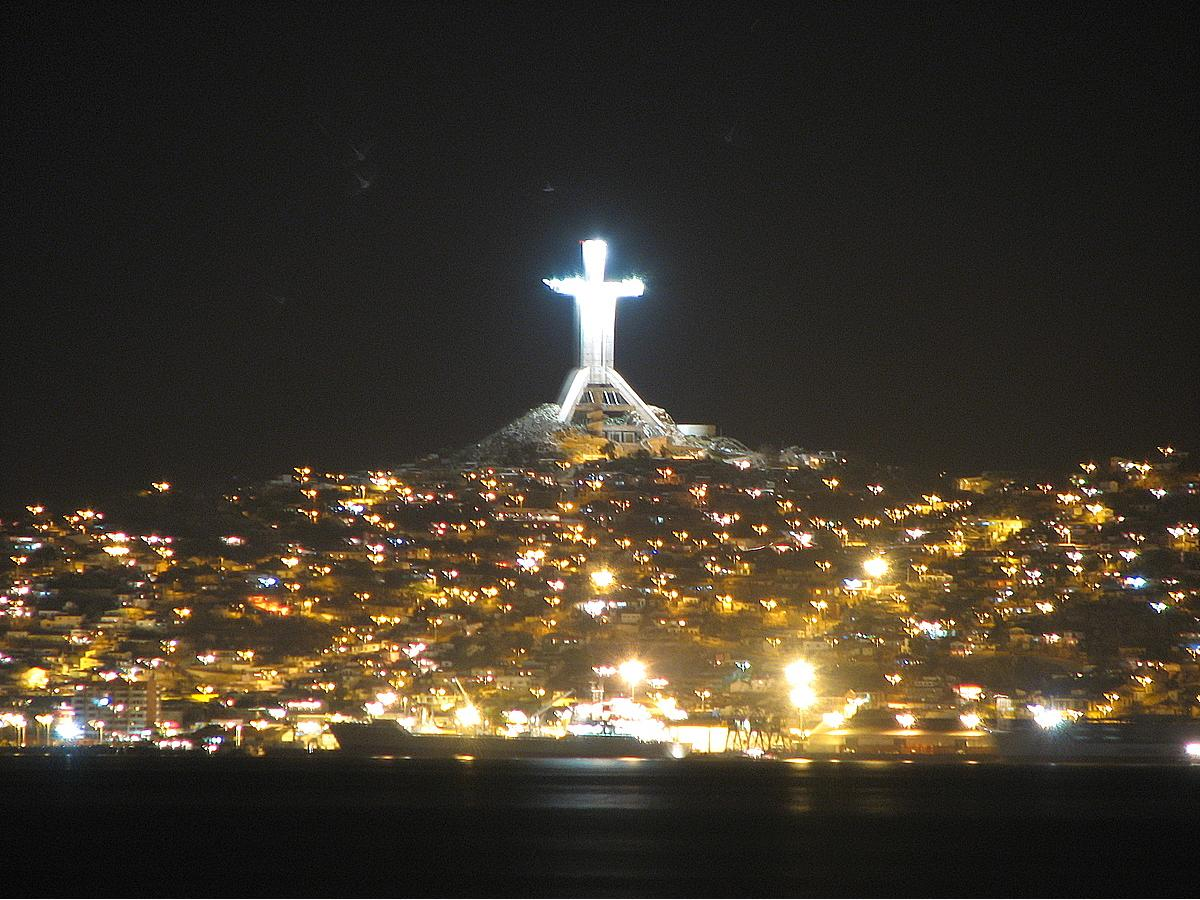
Coquimbo's El Vigía hill with the Cruz Monumental del Tercer Milenio on the top.

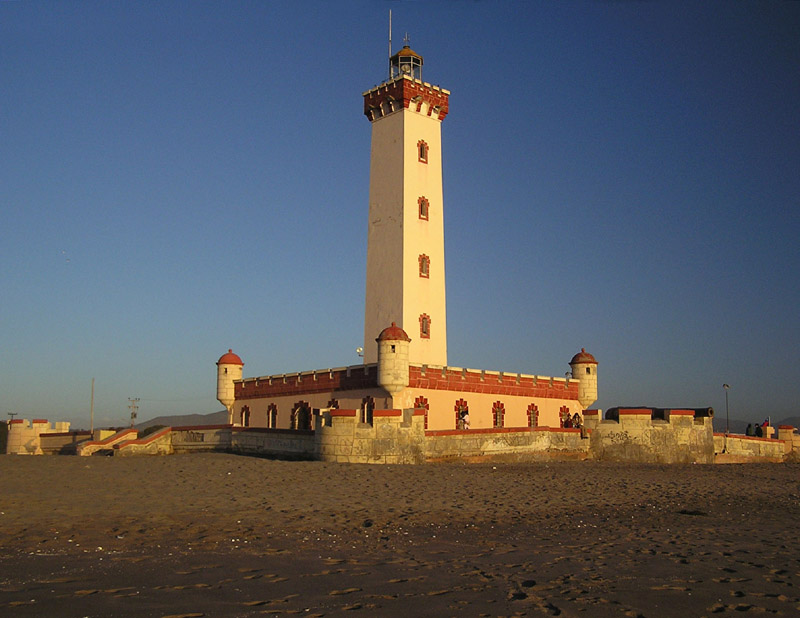
View of El Faro de La Serena at the La Serena Beach

Coquimbo–La Serena Conurbation, the Coquimbo–La Serena Metropolitan Area or Greater La Serena (the latter, rarely used as its name) is a Chilean conurbation that includes Coquimbo and La Serena communes in the Coquimbo Region. It has a population of 412,845, according to the 2012 census, and thus is the fourth largest metropolitan area in Chile, after Santiago, Greater Valparaiso and Greater Concepcion. Its population has doubled over the last 20 years, mainly because of economic growth and the development of tourism in its largest city, La Serena. As with many Chilean conurbations, it has an industrial and port sector, as well as a residential and tourist sector in which the beaches are the main attraction.
