= List of lighthouses in Chile: NGA1155.8–NGA1312 =

This is a list of lighthouses in Chile from Huasco to San Antonio.

== Huasco ==
It.	NGA/Int number	Location	Coordinates	Light characteristic	Height (ft/m) Range (nmi)	Structure description	Height (ft)	Remarks
89	1155.8	Punta Lobos.	28°18.0′S 71°11.6′W	Fl.W. period 5s fl. 1s, ec. 4s	39 12 8	White fiberglass tower, red band, rectangular daymark	11.	Visible 023°-180°.
90	1156; G 1921	Islote Cayo.	28°27.4′S 71°13.7′W	Fl.(4)G. period 12s fl. 0.3s, ec. 1.7s fl. 0.3s, ec. 1.7s fl. 0.3s, ec. 1.7s fl. 0.3s, ec. 5.7s	30 9 5	Green fiberglass tower	11.	
91	1161; G 1918.2	Marine Terminal No. 1, Range, front.	28°27.8′S 71°15.3′W	F.R.		Mast, white square daymark, black ball	16.	Occasional.
92	1161.25; G 1918.21	Middle, 35 meters 275° from front.	28°27.8′S 71°15.3′W	F.G.		Mast, white square daymark, black ball	16.	Occasional.
93	1161.5; G 1918.22	Rear, 50 meters 275° from front.	28°27.8′S 71°15.3′W	F.G.		Mast, white square daymark, black ball	16.	
94	1162; G 1918.4	No. 1 Range, front.	28°28.2′S 71°15.8′W	3 F.R.		Metal tower, white rectangular daymark, black ball	33.	
95	1162.5; G 1918.39	Rear, Anchorage No. 2, 98 meters 203° 54′ from front.	28°28.2′S 71°15.1′W	F.G.		Mast, white rectangular daymark, green ball	16.	
96	1162.8; G 1918.5	Rear, 100 meters, 223° 53′ from front.	28°28.2′S 71°15.1′W	F.G.		Metal tower, white rectangular daymark, black ball	33.	
97	1162.81; G 1918.6	A-1, range, common front.	28°28.3′S 71°14.8′W	F.G.				
98	1162.82; G 1918.59	A-2, rear, 150 meters 225° from common front.	28°28.3′S 71°14.9′W	F.G.				
99	1162.83; G 1918.61	A-3, rear, 139 meters 208° from common front.	28°28.3′S 71°14.9′W	F.G.				
100	1162.9; G 1918.8	Pt. Loros Range, front.	28°28.3′S 71°14.6′W	F.R.		Metal tower, white rectangular daymark, black ball	33.	
101	1162.95; G 1918.81	Rear, 60 meters 143° 46′ from front.	28°28.3′S 71°14.6′W	F.G.		Metal tower, white rectangular daymark, black ball	26.	
102	1163; G 1919.1	Santa Bárbara Terminal Range, common front.	28°28.4′S 71°14.1′W	F.G.		Mast, white rectangular daymark, black ball	33.	
103	1163.5; G 1919.11	Rear, 340 meters 131° 04′ from common front.	28°28.5′S 71°13.9′W	F.G.		Mast, white rectangular daymark, black ball	26.	
104	1163.6; G 1919	Rear, 95 meters 143° from common front.	28°28.4′S 71°14.1′W	F.G.				
105	1163.7	Cordón del Espinazo AVIATION LIGHT.	28°28.7′S 71°15.6′W	F.R.			15	Radio mast.
106	1163.8; G 1916.5	Punta Huasco Sur.	28°30.0′S 71°16.4′W	Fl.W. period 5s fl. 0.4s, ec. 4.6s	115 35 8	White fiberglass tower, red band	11.	Visible 000°-216°.
107	1164; G 1916	Isla Chañaral, W. side.	29°01.9′S 71°35.0′W	Fl.W. period 10s fl. 0.2s, ec. 9.8s	190 58 14	White round tower, red bands	30.	Visible 010°-214°.
108	1165; G 1915	Punta Rancagua.	29°04.7′S 71°30.0′W	Fl.W. period 5s fl. 1s, ec. 4s	66 20 8	White fiberglass tower, red band	11.	Visible 022°-290°.
109	1166; G 1906	Damas Island.	29°13.6′S 71°31.9′W	Fl.(3)W. period 9s fl. 0.3s, ec. 1.7s fl. 0.3s, ec. 1.7s fl. 0.3s, ec. 4.7s	161 49 7	White fiberglass tower, red band	11.	
110	1168; G 1908	Punta Mostacilla.	29°27.0′S 71°18.4′W	Fl.W. period 5s	125 38 6	White fiberglass tower, red band	26.	
111	1172; G 1904	Islotes Pájaros, southernmost islet.	29°35.2′S 71°31.7′W	Fl.(2)W. period 10s fl. 0.5s, ec. 2.4s fl. 0.5s, ec. 6.6s	131 40 10	ISOLATED DANGER BRB, tower	13.	Obscured by N. islet 158°- 162°.

== Coquimbo ==
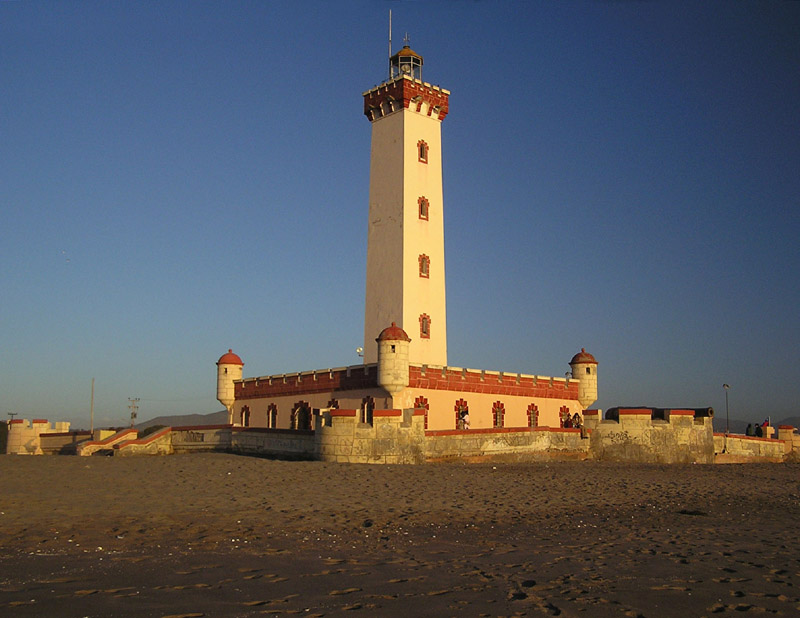
Lighthouse of la Serena

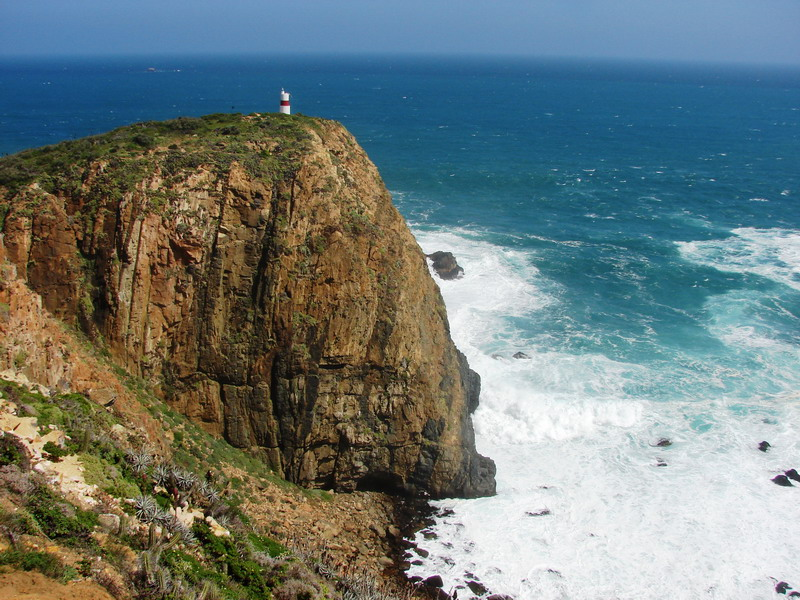
Punta Tablas lighthouse

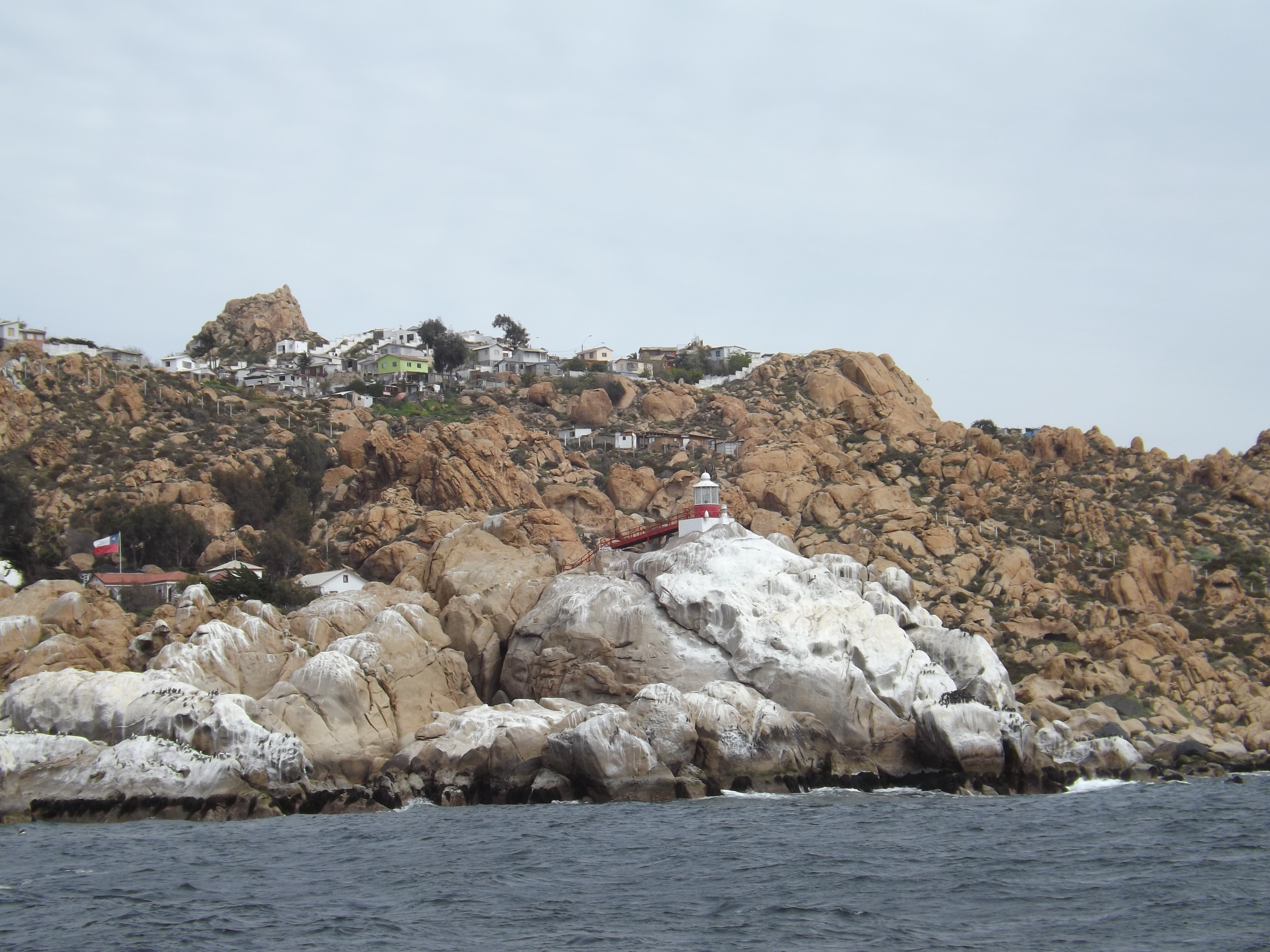
Coquimbo lighthouse

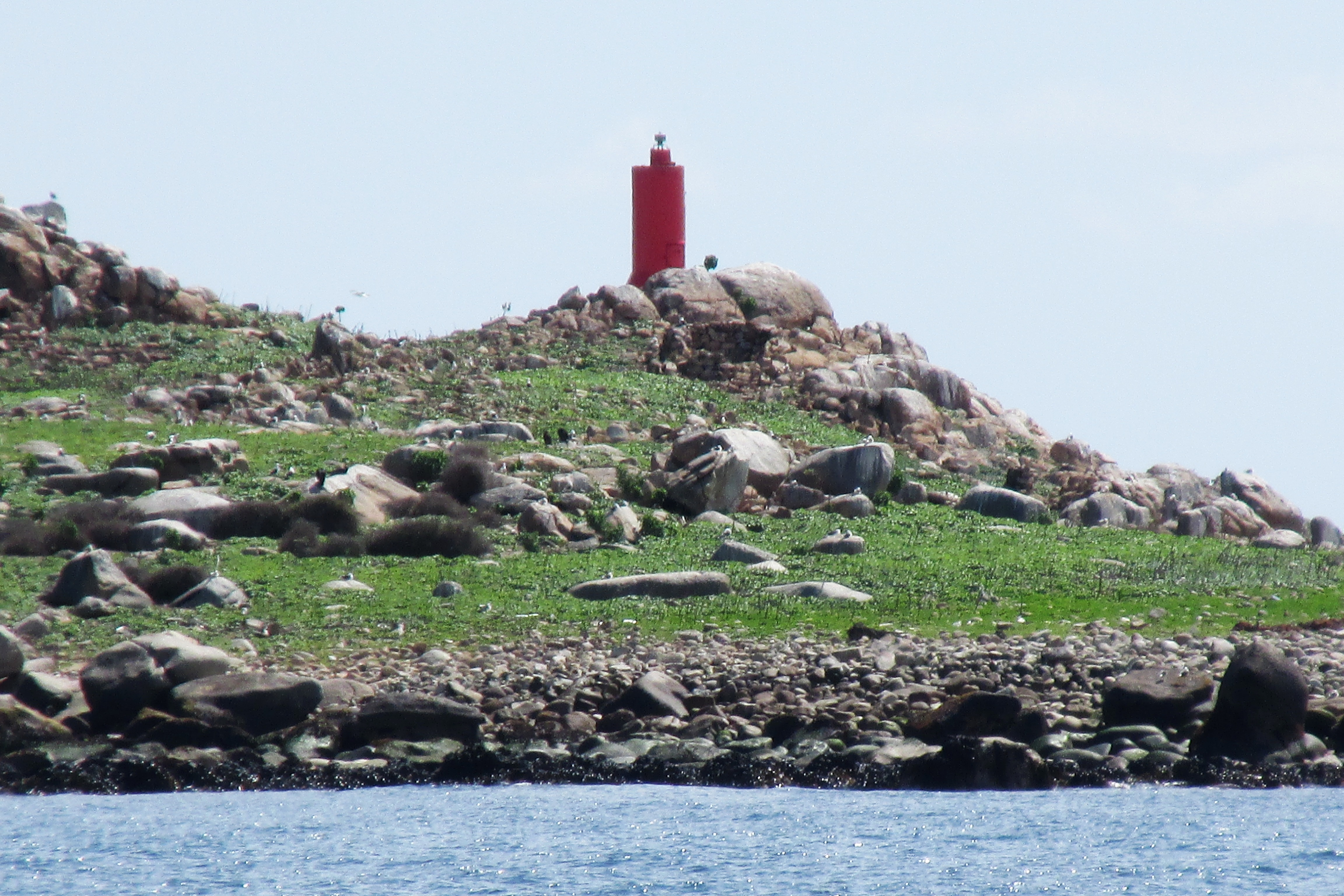
Lighthouse in Islote de los Huevos, off Los Vilos, Coquimbo Region

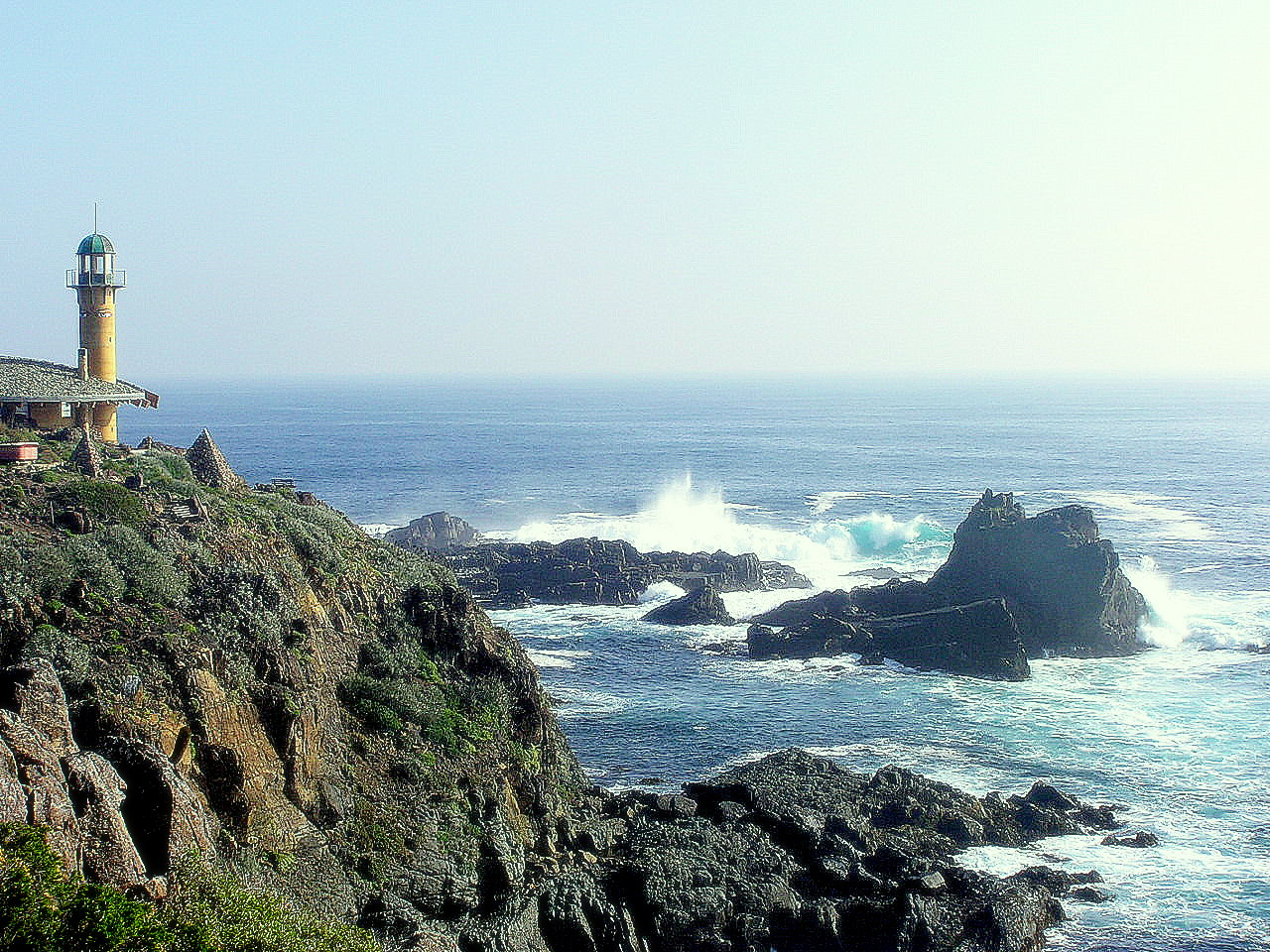
Lighthouse in Ensenada, Coquimbo Region. It seems not to be in use.

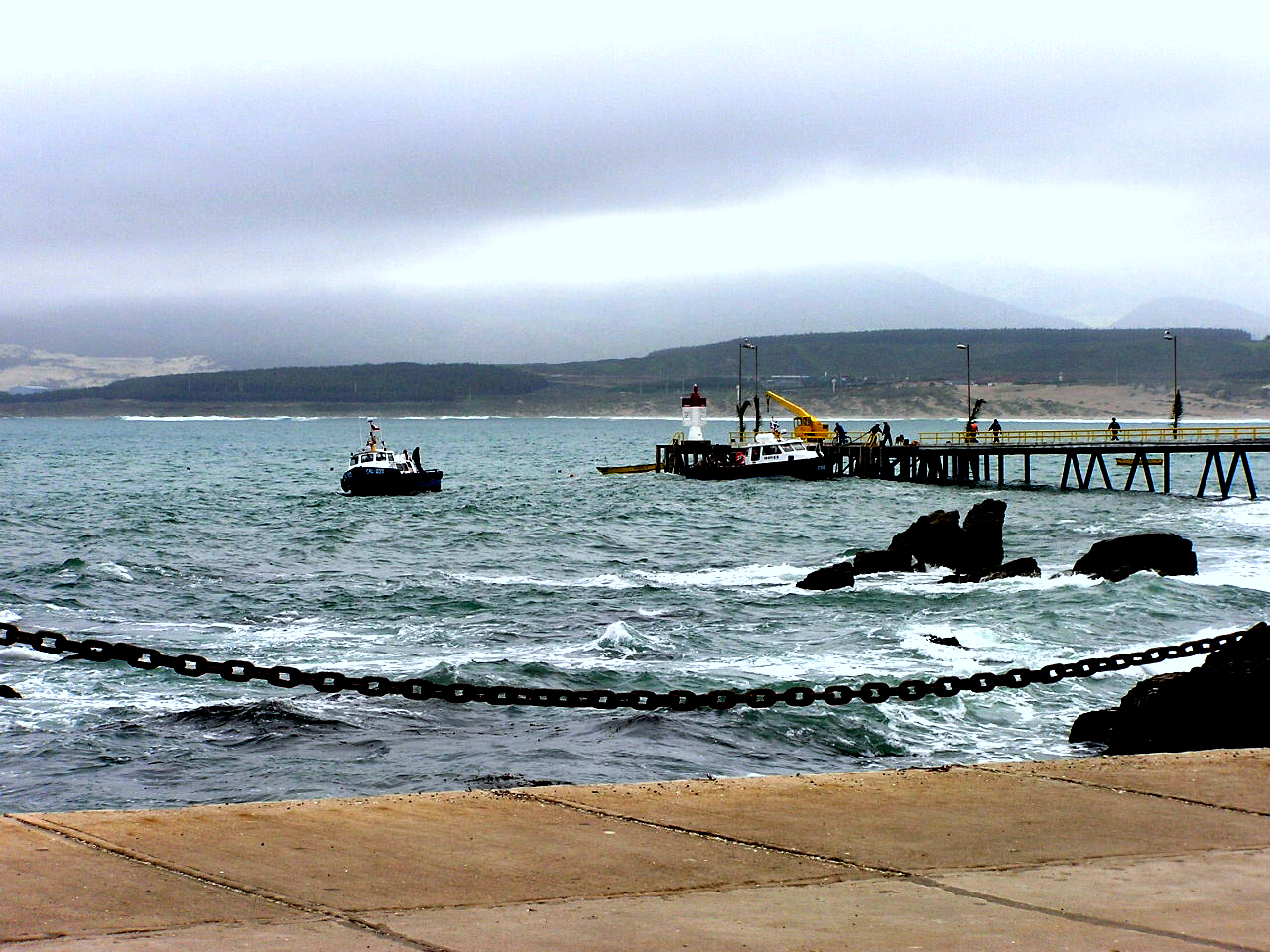
Lighthouse in Los Vilos

It.	NGA/Int number	Location	Coordinates	Light characteristic	Height (ft/m) Range (nmi)	Structure description	Height (ft)	Remarks
112	1176; G 1900.5	Lighthouse of la Serena	29°54.3′S 71°16.5′W	Fl.W. period 5s fl. 0.7s, ec. 4.3s	92 28 20	Cream-colored concrete square tower, red dome	82.	
113	1177; G 1901.5	Caleta Coquimbo.	29°57.3′S 71°20.1′W	Fl.W. period 10s fl. 1s, ec. 9s	23 7 9	White fiberglass tower, red band	11.	Visible 350°-182°.
114	1180; G 1901	Landing pier, head.	29°57.0′S 71°20.1′W	Fl.W. period 5s fl. 0.4s, ec. 4.6s	30 9 8	White metal post, red band	23.	Second light Fl.W.5s2M, visible 180°-270°. F.R. and F.G. in line 194° about 0.25 mile S.
115	1184; G 1900	Punta Tortuga. -RACON	29°55.9′S 71°21.6′W	Fl.W. period 13s fl. 0.2s, ec. 12.8s T(-)	79 24 27	White round metal tower, red band	13.	Visible 042°-255°. 3 F.R. on radio mast 1.97 miles SSE. F.R. on radio mast 0.73 mile S. Siren: 1 bl. ev. 30s (bl. 3s, si. 27s).
116	1188; G 1896.7	Islote Mewes.	29°57.8′S 71°22.9′W	Fl.(3)G. period 9s fl. 0.3s, ec. 1.7s fl. 0.3s, ec. 1.7s fl. 0.3s, ec. 4.7s	29 9 5	Green fiberglass tower	10.	Visible 309°-175°.
117	1192; G 1897	Herradura Approach Range A, front.	29°58.9′S 71°21.1′W	F.R.	69 21 3	Red and white diagonally striped diamond on white square daymark	66.	
118	1192.5; G 1897.1	Rear, 165 meters 140° 30′ from front.	29°59.0′S 71°21.0′W	F.R.	98 30 3	Red and white diagonally striped diamond on white square daymark	74.	
119	1193; G 1898	Mining Pier Range B, front, No. 1.	29°58.5′S 71°21.9′W	F.R.	39 12 3	Red and white diagonally striped diamond on white square daymark	30.	
120	1193.5; G 1898.1	Rear, No. 2, about 48 meters 112.5° from front.	29°58.5′S 71°20.8′W	F.G.	49 15 3	Red and white diagonally striped diamond on white square daymark	30.	
121	1194; G 1898.3	Anchorage Range C, front.	29°58.2′S 71°21.2′W	F.G.	46 14 3	Post, red and white striped rectangular daymark	33.	
122	1194.5; G 1898.31	Rear, about 672 meters 112° from front.	29°58.4′S 71°20.8′W	F.G.	56 17 3	Post, red and white striped rectangular daymark	43.	
123	1195; G 1898.5	Anchorage Range D, front, No. 1.	29°57.9′S 71°22.3′W	F.R.	43 13 3	Red and white diagonally striped diamond on white square daymark	30.	
124	1195.5; G 1898.49	Rear, No. 2, about 120 meters 036° from front.	29°57.9′S 71°21.2′W	F.G.	66 20 3	Red and white diagonally striped diamond on white square daymark	30.	
125	1195.7; G 1898.51	Rear, No. 3, about 120 meters 029° from front.	29°57.9′S 71°21.2′W	F.G.	66 20 3	Red and white diagonally striped diamond on white square daymark	30.	
126	1196; G 1898.7	Oil Berth Range E, front, No. 1.	29°57.9′S 71°22.6′W	F.R.	108 33 3	Post, red and white diagonally striped diamond daymark	16.	
127	1196.5; G 1898.71	Rear, No. 2, about 158 meters 031° from front.	29°57.9′S 71°21.5′W	F.G.	246 75 3	Post, red and white diagonally striped diamond daymark	16.	
128	1204; G 1896.6	Punta Herradura.	29°58.2′S 71°23.3′W	Fl.W. period 5s fl. 0.4s, ec. 4.6s	65 20 10	White fiberglass tower, red bands	11.	Visible 101°-103° and 111°- 298°.
129	1205; G 1896.5	Puerto Velero.	30°13.8′S 71°28.7′W	W Fl.R. period 3s fl. 1s, ec. 2s	7 2 7	STARBOARD (B) R, pillar	7.	Visible 325°-184°.
130	1208; G 1896	Punta Lengua de Vaca.	30°14.8′S 71°37.9′W	Fl.W. period 15s fl. 0.5s, ec. 14.5s	133 41 16	White fiberglass tower red bands	13.	Visible 039°-265°. F.R. lights mark masts SSE. Aero Radiobeacon 8 miles E.
131	1208.5; G 1896.2	Puerto Aldea, Caleta Hornilla.	30°17.6′S 71°36.5′W	Fl.R. period 5s fl. 0.4s, ec. 4.6s	56 17 5	Red fiberglass tower	16.	Visible 175°-340°.
132	1209; G 1896.3	Puerto Aldea.	30°18.0′S 71°36.0′W	Fl.(3)W. period 9s fl. 0.3s, ec. 1.7s fl. 0.3s, ec. 1.7s fl. 0.3s, ec. 4.7s	23 7 7	White fiberglass tower, red band	15.	Visible 106°-261°.
133	1209.5	Río Limarí.	30°44.1′S 71°42.0′W	Fl.(3)W. period 9s fl. 0.5s, ec. 1.5s fl. 0.5s, ec. 1.5s fl. 0.5s, ec. 4.5s	26 8 7	White fiberglass tower, red band, rectangular daymarks	11.	Visible 010°-170°.
134	1210; G 1894	Punta Sierra.	31°08.7′S 71°40.5′W	Fl.W. period 5s fl. 1s, ec. 4s	154 47 6	White fiberglass tower, red band	11.	Visible 013°-174°.
135	1211; G 1893.5	Caleta Chigualoco.	31°45.3′S 71°31.1′W	Fl.W. period 10s fl. 1s, ec. 9s	33 10 2	White fiberglass pillar, red band	20.	Visible 316°-104°.
136	1212; G 1892	Cabo Tablas.	31°51.0′S 71°34.0′W	Fl.W. period 10s fl. 0.4s, ec. 9.6s	236 72 10	White fiberglass tower, red band	16.	Visible 284°-170°.
137	1213; G 1891.3	Islas Blancas.	31°52.7′S 71°31.7′W	Q.(6)+L.Fl.W. period 15s	82 25 7	S. CARDINAL YB, tower	30.	
138	1214; G 1891	Muelle de Pasajeros.	31°54.7′S 71°31.4′W	Fl.R. period 5s fl. 1s, ec. 4s	29 9 8	White fiberglass tower, red band	11.	Visible 059°-271°.
139	1215; G 1891.5	Islote Penitente.	31°52.4′S 71°34.5′W	Fl.(2)W. period 10s fl. 1s, ec. 1.5s fl. 1s, ec. 6.5s	44 14 2	ISOLATED DANGER BRB, tower	11.	
140	1216; G 1890	Isla Huevos, N. side of island.	31°54.3′S 71°31.6′W	Fl.R. period 10s fl. 0.5s, ec. 9.5s	62 19 9	Red round fiberglass tower	13.	Visible 053°-071°, obsc.- 076°, vis.-297°.

== Bahía de Quintero ==
It.	NGA/Int number	Location	Coordinates	Light characteristic	Height (ft/m) Range (nmi)	Structure description	Height (ft)	Remarks
141	1219; G 1882.3	Ventana, No. 1.	32°45.0′S 71°29.3′W	Fl.(3+1)Y. period 20s fl. 0.5s, ec. 1.5s fl. 0.5s, ec. 1.5s fl. 0.5s, ec. 4.5s fl. 0.5s, ec. 10.5s	27 8 3	Yellow metal post, X topmark	12.	
142	1219.5; G 1882.4	No. 2.	32°45.0′S 71°29.2′W	Fl.(3+1)Y. period 20s fl. 0.5s, ec. 1.5s fl. 0.5s, ec. 1.5s fl. 0.5s, ec. 4.5s fl. 0.5s, ec. 10.5s	27 8 3	Yellow metal post, X topmark	12.	
143	1219.6; G 1882.5	No. 3.	32°45.0′S 71°29.2′W	Fl.(3+1)Y. period 20s fl. 0.5s, ec. 1.5s fl. 0.5s, ec. 1.5s fl. 0.5s, ec. 4.5s fl. 0.5s, ec. 10.5s	12 4 3	Yellow metal post, X topmark	12.	
144	1222; G 1883	Ventanilla Range, front.	32°44.8′S 71°28.9′W	Fl.W.R. period 3s fl. 0.5s, ec. 2.5s	46 14 W. 9 R. 6	White concrete post, red bands	36.	W. 039°-105°, R.-122°.
145	1223; G 1883.1	Rear, about 70 meters 090° from front.	32°44.8′S 71°28.9′W	Iso.W. period 6s	59 18 9	On wall.		Visible 055°-120°.
146	1228; G 1888.6	Mono (terminal) Lighted Buoy ENAP.	32°45.7′S 71°31.1′W	Iso.W. period 2.4s	5	White conical buoy.		Horn: 1 bl. ev. 15s. Radar reflector. Aero Radiobeacon 3 miles NNE.
147	1230; G 1889	Oxiquim breakwater.	32°45.7′S 71°29.8′W	Fl.(3+1)Y. period 20s fl. 1s, ec. 2s fl. 1s, ec. 2s fl. 1s, ec. 6s fl. 1s, ec. 6s	26 8 8	Yellow framework tower on dolphin	13.	
148	1232; G 1886	Muelle ENAP.	32°46.2′S 71°29.5′W	F.R.	52 16 4	Iron post, white disc daymark with two black discs superimposed	34.	
149	1233; G 1887.201	Range, front.	32°46.4′S 71°29.5′W	Iso.R. period 2s	44 14 10	White iron post, red stripe, diamond daymark	20.	Visible 139°-165°.
150	1234; G 1887.202	Rear, 81 meters 152° from front.	32°46.5′S 71°29.5′W	Iso.R. period 2s	58 18 10	White iron post, red stripe, diamond daymark	23.	Visible 139°-165°.
151	1235; G 1887.2443	S. El Bato Marine Terminal Range, front.	32°46.6′S 71°29.8′W	Iso.R. period 2s	31 10 3	White metal post, red circular daymark, white stripe	20.	
152	1236; G 1887.2444	Rear, 150 meters 116° from front.	32°46.7′S 71°29.7′W	Iso.R. period 2s	56 17 3	White metal post, red circular daymark, white stripe	20.	
153	1237; G 1887.2441	N. El Bato Marine Terminal Range, front.	32°46.5′S 71°29.7′W	Iso.R. period 2s	39 12 3	White metal post, red rectangular daymark, white stripe	30.	
154	1238; G 1887.2442	Rear, 143 meters 114° from front.	32°46.6′S 71°29.6′W	Iso.R. period 2s	89 27 3	White metal post, red rectangular daymark, white stripe	46.	
155	1244	AVIATION LIGHT.	32°47.0′S 71°32.0′W	Fl.G.	66 20 13	Iron skeleton tower.		Visible 175°-265°. Occasional.
156	1246; G 1887.8	Roca Tortuga.	32°46.8′S 71°31.5′W	Fl.(2)W. period 10s fl. 0.5s, ec. 2.4s fl. 0.5s, ec. 6.6s	20 6 7	Black iron structure, red band	17.	
157	1248; G 1887.6	Muelle Fiscal.	32°46.0′S 71°32.0′W	F.G.	16 5 1	Metal post	10.	Occasional.
158	1252; G 1882	Península Los Molles.	32°46.3′S 71°32.2′W	Fl.W. period 15s fl. 0.3s, ec. 14.7s	308 94 22	White truncated conical concrete tower, red bands	59.	Visible 020°-236° 30′.

== Bahía Concón ==
It.	NGA/Int number	Location	Coordinates	Light characteristic	Height (ft/m) Range (nmi)	Structure description	Height (ft)	Remarks
159	1254; G 1880.5	Club de Yates Higuerilla.	32°55.8′S 71°32.4′W	Fl.W. period 5s fl. 1s, ec. 4s	36 11 10	White fiberglass tower, red band	23.	Visible 145°-231°.
160	1255; G 1880	Punta Concón.	32°55.7′S 71°33.2′W	Fl.W. period 12s fl. 0.4s, ec. 11.6s Fl.(2)R. period 6s fl. 0.5s, ec. 1.5s fl. 0.5s, ec. 3.5s	49 15 18; 49 15 11	White fiberglass tower, red band	10.	Visible 352°-234°. Visible 172°-180° on the rocks of Concon.
161	1255.5; G 1877	Muelle Barón.	33°02.4′S 71°36.5′W	Oc.G. period 3s lt. 2s, ec. 1s	46 14 4	Orange metal post	13.	Visible 070°-290°.

== Bahía de Valparaíso ==
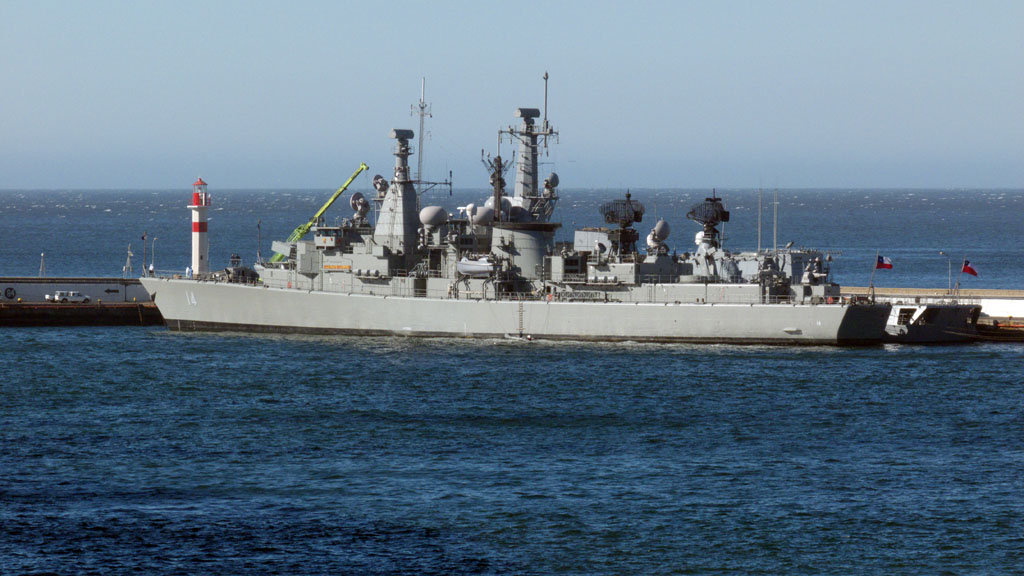
Duprat lighthouse in Valparaíso

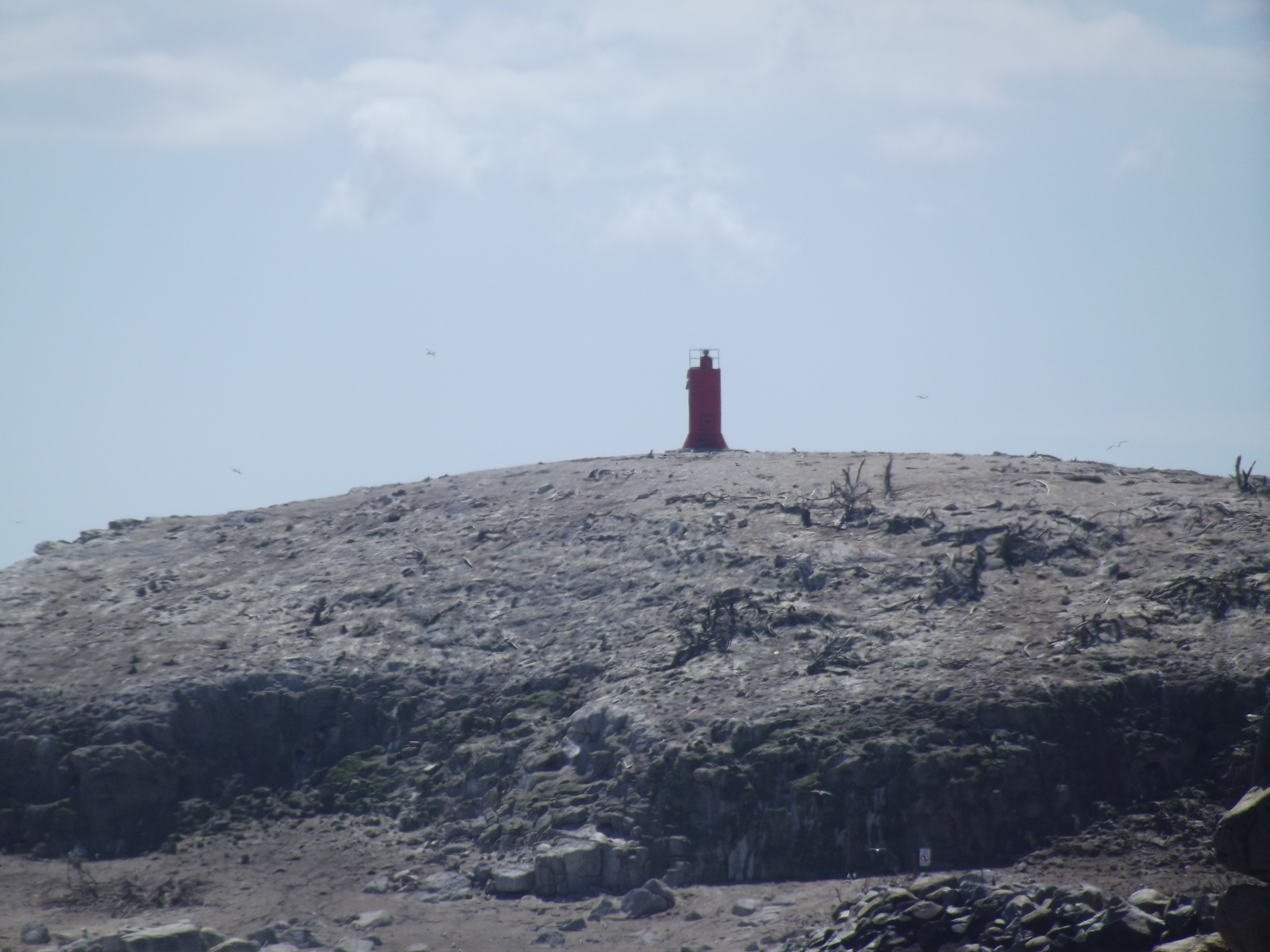
Lighthouse in Pájaro Niño Islet, Algarrobo

It.	NGA/Int number	Location	Coordinates	Light characteristic	Height (ft/m) Range (nmi)	Structure description	Height (ft)	Remarks
162	1256; G 1876	Breakwater.	33°01.9′S 71°37.3′W	Fl.W. period 5s fl. 0.2s, ec. 4.8s	39 12 20	White skeleton iron tower, red band	23.	Visible 138°-125°.
163	1260; G 1875	Punta Duprat.	33°01.6′S 71°37.6′W	Fl.W. period 10s fl. 0.7s, ec. 9.3s	69 21 20	White octagonal concrete tower, red band	51.	Visible 335°-318°.
164	1261; G 1879.1	Club de Yates Recreo.	33°01.6′S 71°34.8′W	Fl.R. period 3s fl. 1s, ec. 2s	18 6 7	Red fiberglass tower, triangular daymark	7.	Visible 126°-239°.
165	1263; G 1878	Punta Gruesa, Condell.	33°01.3′S 71°35.0′W	Fl.W. period 12s fl. 1s, ec. 11s	56 17 20	White metal tower, red bands	22.	Visible 026°-244°.
166	1268; G 1874	Punta Ángeles.	33°01.4′S 71°38.8′W	Fl.W. period 10s fl. 0.2s, ec. 9.8s	197 60 32	White round metal tower, red bands	59.	Visible 048° 30′ -250°.
167	1272; G 1870	Punta Curaumilla.	33°06.0′S 71°44.4′W	Fl.W. period 15s fl. 0.5s, ec. 14.5s	276 84 10	White metal tower, red band, dwelling	11.	Visible 344°-244°.
168	1276; G 1871	Muelle Laguna Verde.	33°06.0′S 71°41.0′W	F.R.	2			
169	1278; G 1869	Rada Quintay.	33°11.5′S 71°43.2′W	Fl.R. period 10s fl. 0.3s, ec. 9.7s Fl.W. period 5s fl. 0.4s, ec. 4.6s	85 26 4; 82 25 10	Truncated red conical tower	20.	Visible 025°-355°. Visible 126°-128° over Fraile rock.
170	1280; G 1866	Península Pájaros Niños.	33°21.4′S 71°41.8′W	Fl.R. period 10s fl. 0.5s, ec. 9.5s Fl.W. period 5s fl. 0.5s, ec. 4.5s	115 35 11; 111 34 8	Red fiberglass tower	13.	Visible 163°-150°. Visible 150°-163°.
171	1282; G 1864	Poza Cofradía.	33°21.4′S 71°41.7′W	Fl.(3) R. period 9s fl. 0.3s, ec. 1.5s fl. 0.3s, ec. 1.5s fl. 0.3s, ec. 5.1s	19 6 5	Red round concrete tower	7.	Visible 129°-309°.
172	1283; G 1863	Cofradía Náutica.	33°21.5′S 71°41.7′W	Fl.W. period 8s	66 20 14	Black round iron tower	60.	Visible 186°-206°.

== San Antonio ==
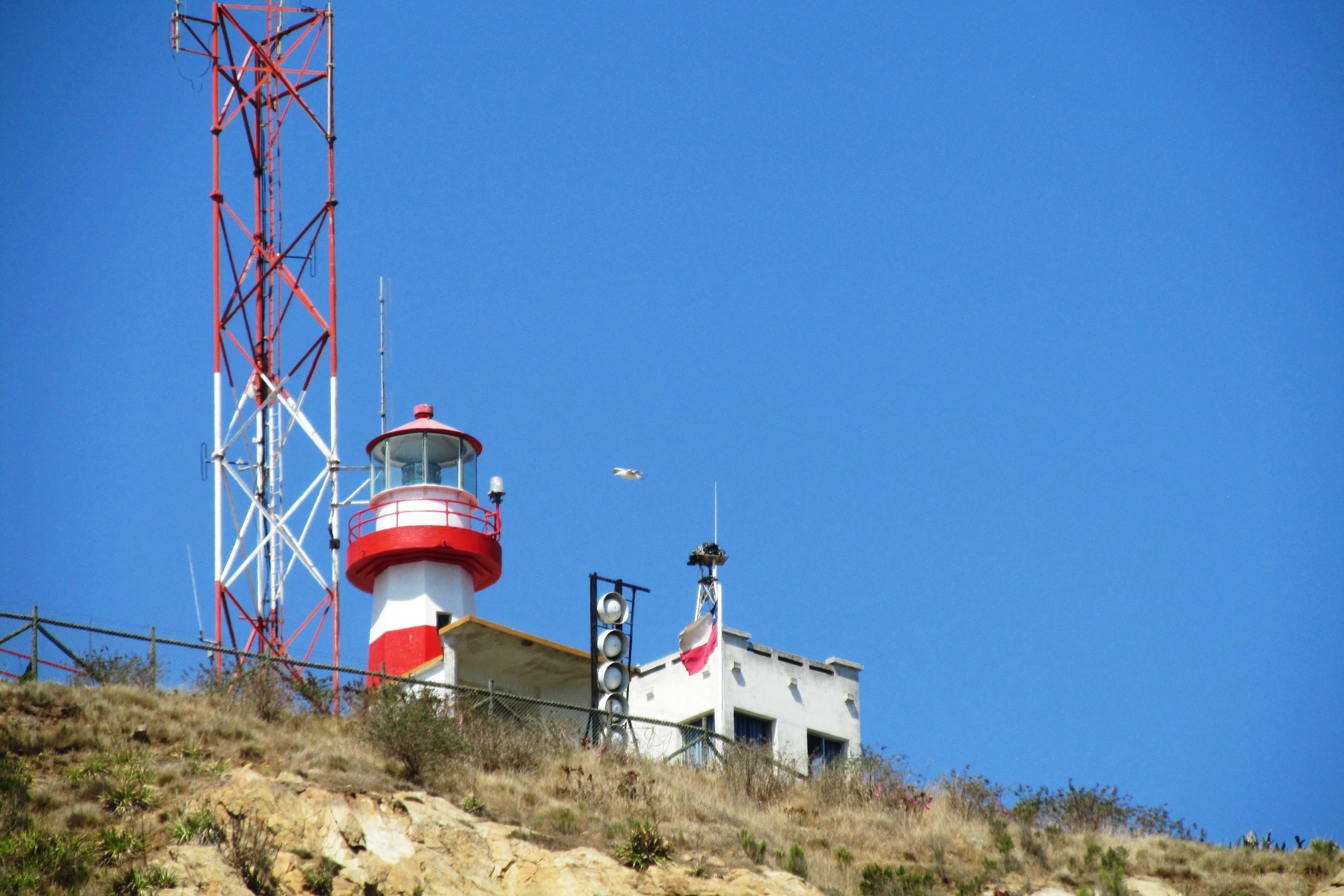
Panul lighthouse in San Antonio

It.	NGA/Int number	Location	Coordinates	Light characteristic	Height (ft/m) Range (nmi)	Structure description	Height (ft)	Remarks
173	1284; G 1857	Punta Panul.	33°34.5′S 71°37.5′W	Fl.W. period 10s fl. 0.2s, ec. 9.8s	292 89 32	White hexagonal concrete tower, red bands	31.	Siren: 2 bl. ev. 30s. Radio telephone.
174	1292; G 1859	Muelle Policarpo Toro.	33°35.0′S 71°37.3′W	Fl.G. period 5s fl. 1s, ec. 4s	52 16 10	Green metal tower	34.	
175	1296; G 1859.3	North Harbor Range, front.	33°35.0′S 71°36.8′W	Fl.R. period 3s fl. 1s, ec. 2s	82 25 8	Metal pillar, white triangular daymark, orange stripe	43.	Private light.
176	1300; G 1859.31	Rear, 78 meters 092° 36′ from front.	33°35.0′S 71°36.7′W	Fl.R. period 3s fl. 1s, ec. 2s	118 36 8	Metal pillar, white triangular daymark, orange stripe	46.	Private light.
177	1303; G 1858.5	Molo Sur.	33°35.2′S 71°37.4′W	Fl.W. period 5s fl. 1s, ec. 4s	39 12 16	Red round metal structure on concrete base	10.	Visible 030°-151°.
178	1304; G 1858	S. mole, head.	33°35.2′S 71°37.4′W	Fl.R. period 5s fl. 1s, ec. 4s	34 11 8	Red conical fiberglass tower	5.	Aero Radiobeacon 3 miles S. on Santo Domingo Point.
179	1308; G 1860	Espigón de Atraque, NE. corner.	33°35.0′S 71°37.0′W	F.R.	26 8 2	Metal post	16.	Private light.
180	1309; G 1859.2	Range, front.	33°35.5′S 71°37.0′W	F.R.	26 8 2	Metal pillar, white triangular daymark, red stripe	20.	Private light.
181	1309.5; G 1859.21	Rear, about 100 meters 141° from front.	33°35.5′S 71°36.9′W	F.R.	56 17 2	Metal pillar, white triangular daymark, red stripe	46.	Private light.
182	1309.6; G 1859.15	Range, front.	33°35.7′S 71°37.0′W	Fl.G. period 3s fl. 1s, ec. 2s	30 9 3	Metal framework tower, white rectangular daymark, red stripe	24.	
183	1309.7; G 1859.16	Rear, 153 meters 156° from front.	33°35.8′S 71°37.0′W	Fl.G. period 3s fl. 1s, ec. 2s	33 10 3	Metal framework tower, white rectangular daymark, red stripe	37.	
184	1310; G 1859.1	Range, front.	33°35.6′S 71°37.1′W	F.G.	33 10 2	Metal pillar, red rectangular daymark, white band	26.	Private light.
185	1310.5; G 1859.11	Rear, about 125 meters 164° 24′ from front.	33°35.7′S 71°37.1′W	F.G.	46 14 2	Metal pillar, red rectangular daymark, white band	33.	Private light.
186	1312; G 1860.2	SW corner.	33°35.0′S 71°37.0′W	F.R.	20 6 2	Metal post	16.	Private light.

== See also ==
- List of fjords, channels, sounds and straits of Chile
- List of islands of Chile
