= Lighthouse of La Serena =

La Serena Monumental Lighthouse Faro Monumental de La Serena
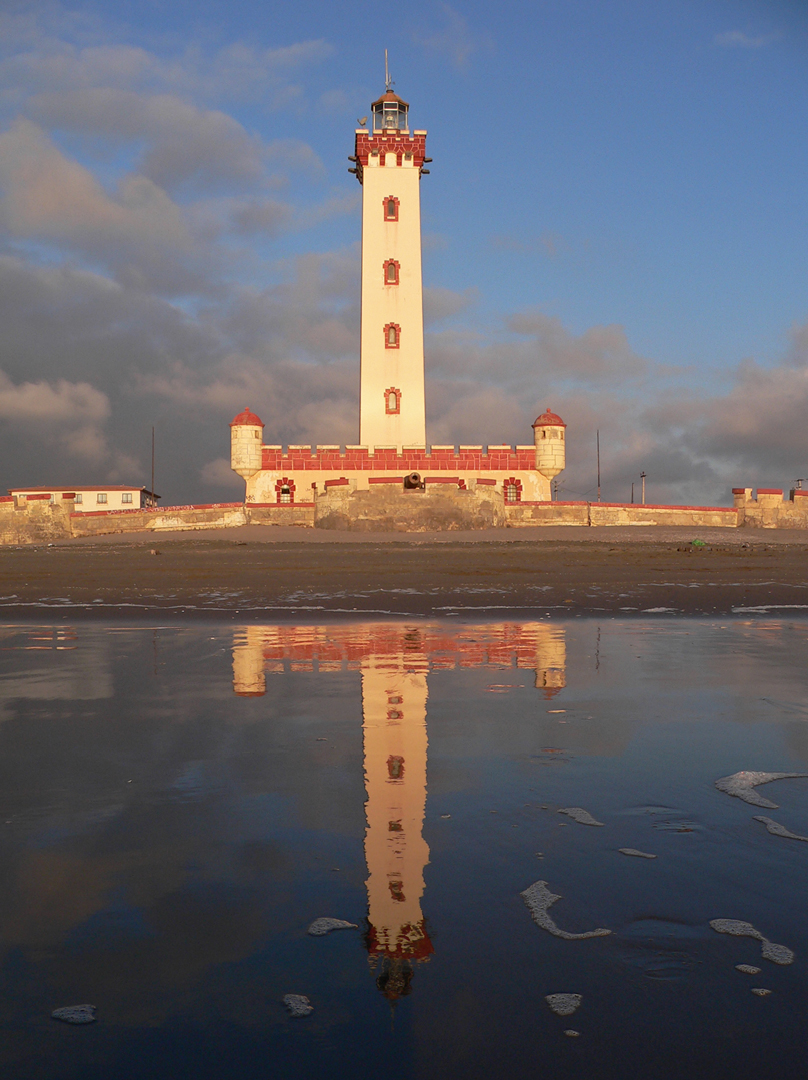
- Faro de La Serena
- Location: La Serena, Chile
- Coordinates: 29°54′20.4″S 71°16′27.38″W

Tower
- Constructed: 1950
- Foundation: Concrete
- Construction: Concrete
- Height: 25 metres (82 ft)
- Shape: Square tower with balcony and lantern rising from the centre of one-story building
- Markings: Cream color tower with red trim, red lantern
- Operator: Municipalidad de La Serena
- Heritage: Chilean National Monument

Light
- First lit: 1951
- Focal height: 28 metres (92 ft)
- Light source: Mains power
- Range: 20 nmi (37 km; 23 mi)
- Characteristic: Fl W 5s.

The Monumental Lighthouse of La Serena (Faro Monumental de La Serena) is a Chilean lighthouse located at the Avenida del Mar of La Serena. The structure is one of the most representative of the city and one of the most popular tourist attractions in the area.

== Construction ==
It was built between 1950 and 1951 at the request of President Gabriel González Videla during the development of his Plan Serena. The construction was designed by Ramiro Pérez Arce and directed by University of Chile civil engineer Jorge Tanks Larenas. In April 1953 it was officially handed over to the authorities, led by mayor Ernesto Aguirre Valín, the provincial mayor Roberto Flores Alvarez and president González Videla. On October 24, 1953, the structure was inaugurated by mayor Juan Cortés Alcayaga of the Municipality of La Serena, the lighting system was removed afterwards, leaving it as notable point of reference in later charts and publications. On November 7, 1985, the then Commander in Chief of the Navy, Admiral José Toribio Merino presented the lighthouse as a tourist attraction for the city to the then mayor Eugenio Rodríguez Munizaga. The May 12, 1986, the Chilean Navy officially handed the Lighthouse to the Municipality, taking charge of its maintenance. On June 9, 2010, the building was registered on the National Heritage List.

== See also ==
- List of lighthouses and lightvessels in Chile
- List of National Monuments of Chile
