= List of lighthouses in Chile: NGA1544–NGA1816 =

This is a list of lighthouses in Chile from Chacao Channel to Dalcahue Channel.

== Chacao Channel ==
It.	NGA/Int number	Location	Coordinates	Light characteristic	Height (ft/m) Range (nmi)	Structure description	Height (ft)	Remarks
275	1544; G 1672	Isla Doña Sebastiana, SE. point, front.	41°44.7′S 73°48.3′W	Fl.Y. period 5s fl. 1s, ec. 4s	72 22 14	Yellow fiberglass tower, black bands	13.	Visible 275°-295°.
276	1548; G 1672.1	SW. point, about 1.3 km. 285° 30′ from front.	41°44.5′S 73°49.3′W	Fl.W. period 5s fl. 1s, ec. 4s	98 30 10	White fiberglass tower, red bands	46.	Visible 225°-167°.
277	1552; G 1676	Punta Corona. -RACON	41°47.0′S 73°52.8′W	Fl.W. period 10s fl. 0.2s, ec. 9.8s O (– – –)	216 66 32	White concrete tower, red bands, white house	31.	Visible 135°-342°. Siren: 2 bl. ev. 30s. Signal station. Radiobeacon.
278	1556; G 1678	Punta Ahui, W. side of entrance to Bahía de Ancud.	41°49.7′S 73°51.3′W	Fl.R. period 5s fl. 0.4s, ec. 4.6s	157 48 5	Red fiberglass tower	13.	Visible 132°-036°.
279	1557	Muelle Rompeolas Ancud.	41°52.0′S 73°50.0′W	Fl.G. period 5s fl. 0.5s, ec. 4.5s	23 7 4	Green metal tower	13.	Visible 087°-190°.
280	1558; G 1678.5	Río Pudeto.	41°51.7′S 73°48.3′W	Fl.W. period 5s fl. 0.4s, ec. 4.6s	66 20 6	White fiberglass tower, red band	11.	Visible 144°-349°.
281	1560; G 1675	Bajo Colo-Colo.	41°45.2′S 73°43.5′W	Fl.G. period 5s fl. 0.4s, ec. 4.6s	33 10 6	Green triangular metal framework tower	54.	Visible 273°-099°.
282	1562	Caleta Carelmapu.	41°44.8′S 73°42.4′W	Fl.R. period 5s fl. 0.5s, ec. 4.5s	10 3 3	Red metal pillar	10.	Visible 284°-000°.
283	1564; G 1674	Punta Lenqui.	41°45.3′S 73°39.8′W	Fl.W. period 12s fl. 0.5s, ec. 11.5s	95 29 7	White concrete tower, red band	15.	Visible 282°-116°.
284	1572; G 1671	Punta San Gallán.	41°47.8′S 73°32.4′W	Fl.W. period 10s fl. 0.5s, ec. 9.5s	197 60 11	Two white concrete posts, two red bands at top	33.	Visible 083°-305°.
285	1574; G 1670.5	Roca Remolinos.	41°47.7′S 73°31.4′W	Fl.(2+1)R. period 14s	26 8 4	PREFERRED CHANNEL (B) RGR, pillar	33.	Radar reflector.
286	1576; G 1670	Punta Barranco.	41°47.6′S 73°30.6′W	Fl.W. period 12s fl. 0.7s, ec. 11.3s	89 27 10	White fiberglass tower, red band	26.	Visible 300°-122°.
287	1578; G 1668.6	Punta Coronel.	41°48.0′S 73°28.8′W	Fl.G. period 3s fl. 0.3s, ec. 2.7s	30 9 7	PORT (B) G, fiberglass tower	18.	Visible 005°-056°. Radar reflector.
288	1580; G 1668	Puerto Chacao Nuevo, ferry pier, head.	41°49.7′S 73°30.9′W	Fl.G. period 3s fl. 1s, ec. 2s	26 8 7	Green fiberglass tower	13.	Visible 162°-273°.
289	1584; G 1669	Bahía Pargua, ferry pier, head.	41°47.6′S 73°27.6′W	Fl.(2)G. period 6s fl. 0.5s, ec. 1.5s fl. 0.5s, ec. 3.5s	33 10 8	Green iron post	8.	
290	1585; G 1669.8	Muelle Skretting.	41°47.3′S 73°26.7′W	Fl.W. period 5s fl. 0.1s, ec. 4.9s	42 13 10	White iron pillar, red band	20.	Visible 294°-062°.
291	1588; G 1666	Punta Tres Cruces.	41°50.1′S 73°29.2′W	Fl.W. period 15s fl. 0.2s, ec. 14.8s	128 39 16	White fiberglass tower, red band	26.	Visible 095°-004°.
292	1592; G 1682	Bajo Corvío, Paso Quigua.	41°49.8′S 73°12.6′W	Fl.(4)W. period 12s fl. 0.5s, ec. 1.5s fl. 0.5s, ec. 1.5s fl. 0.5s, ec. 1.5s fl. 0.5s, ec. 5.5s	36 11 5	White fiberglass tower, red band	39.	
293	1593; G 1683	Bajo Chalín, Quihua Shoal.	41°49.3′S 73°12.3′W	Fl.G. period 5s fl. 0.4s, ec. 4.6s	26 8 4	Green fiberglass tower on pile	26.	

== Reloncaví Sound ==
It.	NGA/Int number	Location	Coordinates	Light characteristic	Height (ft/m) Range (nmi)	Structure description	Height (ft)	Remarks
294	1596; G 1714	Muelle Calbuco.	41°46.2′S 73°07.5′W	Fl.G. period 5s fl. 1s, ec. 4s	23 7 7	Green fiberglass tower, green square daymark	11.	Visible 177°-339°.
295	1600; G 1712	Punta Metrencue, Canal Calbuco.	41°43.8′S 73°05.7′W	Fl.(3)W. period 9s fl. 0.3s, ec. 1.7s fl. 0.3s, ec. 1.7s fl. 0.3s, ec. 4.7s	16 5 6	White fiberglass tower, red band	13.	Visible 240°-030°.
296	1604; G 1710	Paso Tautil.	41°43.6′S 73°03.3′W	Fl.G. period 5s fl. 0.4s, ec. 4.6s	39 12 4	Green triangular metal framework tower, green square daymark	39.	
297	1608; G 1704	Isla Mallina.	41°39.5′S 72°59.3′W	Fl.(4)W. period 12s fl. 0.5s, ec. 1.5s fl. 0.5s, ec. 1.5s fl. 0.5s, ec. 1.5s fl. 0.5s, ec. 5.5s	108 33 7	White fiberglass tower, red band	20.	Visible 012°-270°.
298	1612; G 1696	Punta Redonda.	41°41.8′S 72°53.3′W	Fl.W. period 5s fl. 0.4s, ec. 4.6s	33 10 7	White fiberglass tower, red band	20.	Visible 168°-036°.
299	1613; G 1703.33	Punta Anselmo.	41°30.8′S 72°59.8′W	Fl.(2)G. period 6s fl. 0.5s, ec. 1s fl. 0.5s, ec. 4s	13 4 2	Green iron post	13.	
300	1615; G 1703.31	Kochifas.	41°30.1′S 72°59.4′W	Fl.W. period 10s fl. 1s, ec. 9s	20 6 6	White fiberglass tower, red stripe	11.	Visible 223°-034°.
301	1620; G 1702	Costanera, E.	41°28.8′S 72°57.0′W	Fl.R. period 3s fl. 0.3s, ec. 2.7s	23 7 2	Red iron post	23.	
302	1624; G 1702.2	Tenglo, E.	41°28.9′S 72°57.1′W	Fl.G. period 3s fl. 0.3s, ec. 2.7s	16 5 2	Green iron post	16.	
303	1628; G 1702.3	Costanera, W.	41°28.9′S 72°57.6′W	Fl.R. period 3s fl. 0.3s, ec. 2.7s	19 6 4	Red iron post	20.	
304	1632; G 1702.4	Tenglo, W.	41°28.9′S 72°57.1′W	Fl.G. period 3s fl. 0.3s, ec. 2.7s	19 6 4	Green iron post	20.	
305	1633; G 1703	Canal Tenglo Range, front.	41°29.5′S 72°58.2′W	Fl.W. period 5s fl. 0.4s, ec. 4.6s	23 7 14	White fiberglass tower, red band	11.	Visible 228°-236°.
306	1634; G 1703.1	-Rear, 20 meters 232° from front.	41°29.6′S 72°58.2′W	Fl.W. period 5s fl. 0.4s, ec. 4.6s	43 13 14	White fiberglass tower, red band	11.	Visible 228°-236°.
307	1636; G 1700	Malecón de atraque.	41°29.0′S 72°57.3′W	Fl.R. period 3s fl. 0.3s, ec. 2.7s	31 9 4	Red fiberglass tower	13.	Visible 217°-272°.
308	1638; G 1696.7	Caleta Puelche.	41°44.3′S 72°38.8′W	Fl.(3)W. period 9s fl. 0.5s, ec. 1.5s fl. 0.5s, ec. 1.5s fl. 0.5s, ec. 4.5s	26 8 6	White fiberglass tower, red band	11.	Visible 055°-180°.
309	1638.2; G 1696.5	Caleta La Arena.	41°41.5′S 72°38.5′W	Fl.W. period 5s fl. 0.4s, ec. 4.6s	33 10 6	White fiberglass tower, red band	11.	Visible 042°-112°.

== Reloncaví Estuary ==
It.	NGA/Int number	Location	Coordinates	Light characteristic	Height (ft/m) Range (nmi)	Structure description	Height (ft)	Remarks
310	1640; G 1697	Río Puelo.	41°39.0′S 72°20.0′W	Fl.W. period 6s fl. 0.5s, ec. 5.5s	23 7 5	Framework tower on cement base	10.	Visible 062°-104° and 107°- 203°.
311	1644; G 1698	Bahía Cochamó.	41°29.0′S 72°19.0′W	Fl.(3)W. period 9s fl. 0.5s, ec. 1.5s fl. 0.5s, ec. 1.5s fl. 0.5s, ec. 4.5s	25 8 5	White fiberglass tower, red band	11.	Visible 330°-115°.

== Gulf of Ancud ==
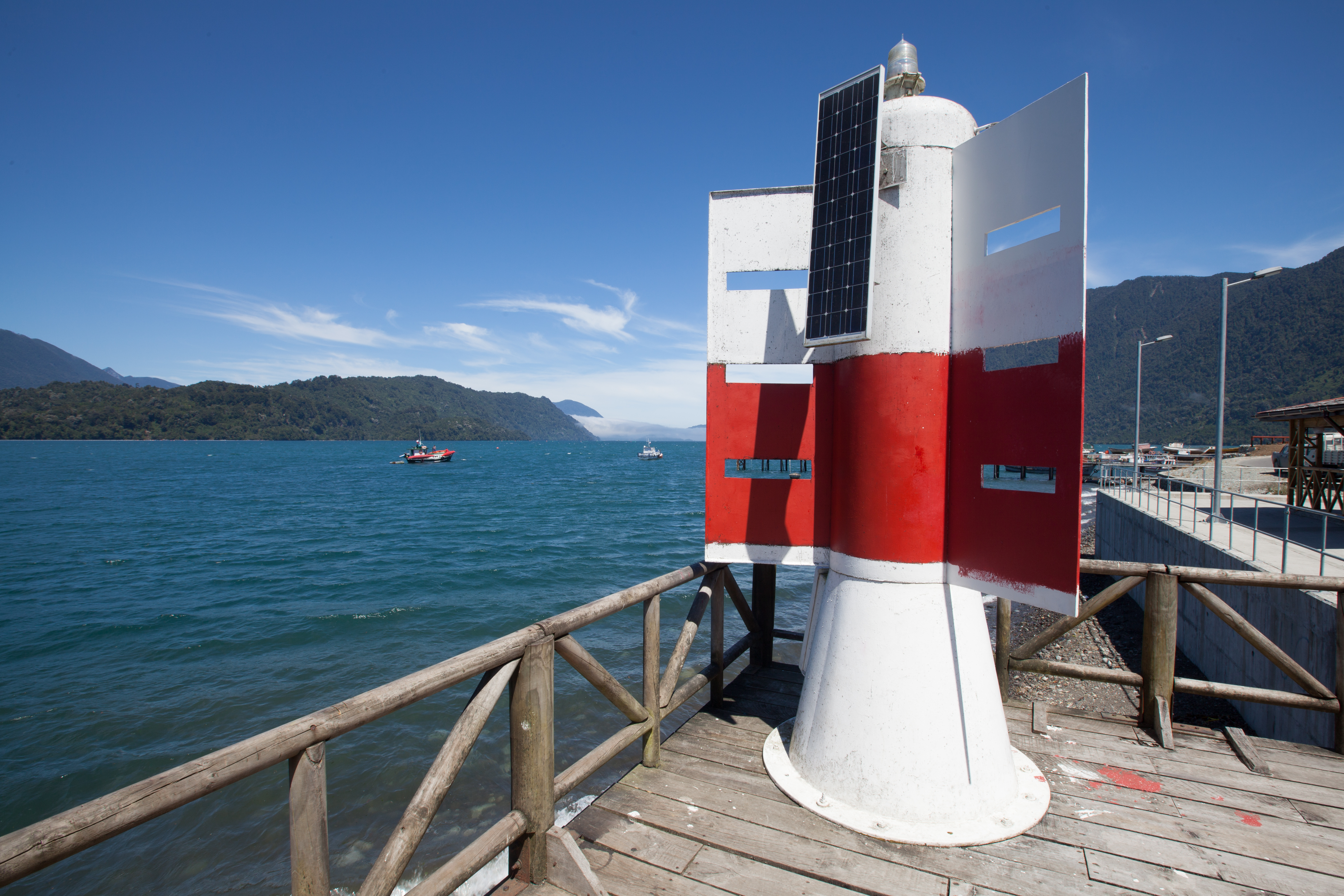
Río Regro lighthouse, also known as "Hornopirén"

It.	NGA/Int number	Location	Coordinates	Light characteristic	Height (ft/m) Range (nmi)	Structure description	Height (ft)	Remarks
312	1652; G 1694	Estero Quildaco, N. side of entrance.	41°51.4′S 72°47.8′W	Fl.(4)W. period 12s fl. 0.5s, ec. 1.5s fl. 0.5s, ec. 1.5s fl. 0.5s, ec. 1.5s fl. 0.5s, ec. 5.5s	79 24 6	White fiberglass tower, red band	13.	Visible 053°-178°.
313	1653	Caleta Curamín.	41°52.8′S 72°49.3′W	Fl.W. period 5s fl. 0.5s, ec. 4.5s	16 5 2	White metal piling, red band	11.	Visible 045°-154°.
314	1654; G 1706	Bajo Huelmo.	41°39.4′S 73°02.5′W	Fl.(2)G. period 6s fl. 0.5s, ec. 1.5s fl. 0.5s, ec. 3.5s	26 8 5	White fiberglass tower, upper part green, can topmark on column	26.	Visible 177°-060°.
315	1656; G 1684	Isla Tabón, near W. end.	41°54.6′S 73°08.6′W	Fl.W. period 10s fl. 0.7s, ec. 9.3s	240 73 10	White concrete tower, red band	44.	Obscured 175° 30′ -183° 30′ and 190°-193° 30′.
316	1658; G 1686	Banco Amnistía.	41°57.6′S 73°06.8′W	Fl.(2)W. period 10s fl. 0.5s, ec. 2.4s fl. 0.5s, ec. 6.6s	20 6 7	Black metal piling, red band	20.	Radar reflector.
317	1660; G 1692	Isla Queullín, Paso Queullín, on sandy spit extending from Punta Huin.	41°52.5′S 72°56.2′W	Fl.W. period 15s fl. 0.5s, ec. 14.5s	46 14 10	White round concrete tower with red band	28.	Visible 326°-232°.
318	1662; G 1693.5	Punta Trentelhue.	41°53.8′S 72°50.9′W	Fl.W. period 5s fl. 0.4s, ec. 4.6s	13 4 5	White fiberglass pillar, red band	10.	Visible 032°-210°.
319	1664; G 1693	Banco San José.	41°50.5′S 72°55.1′W	Fl.(2+1)R. period 14s fl. 0.3s, ec. 1.7s fl. 0.3s, ec. 3.7s fl. 0.3s, ec. 7.7s	43 13 6	Red triangular metal framework tower, green band	43.	
320	1666; G 1691.5	Punta Hurón.	41°55.7′S 72°51.0′W	Fl.W. period 5s fl. 1s, ec. 4s	171 52 6	White fiberglass tower, red band	11.	Visible 240° -090°.
321	1667.5; G 1691	Bajo Chauchil.	41°58.6′S 72°49.1′W	Fl.(3)W. period 9s fl. 0.5s, ec. 1.5s fl. 0.5s, ec. 1.5s fl. 0.5s, ec. 4.5s	10 3 6	White round metal pillar, red band with balcony	10.	Visible 314°-131°.
322	1668; G 1688	Punta Gualaihue.	42°01.7′S 72°41.3′W	Fl.W. period 12s fl. 1s, ec. 11s	39 12 8	White fiberglass tower, red band	13.	Visible 210°-140°.
323	1669; G 1689	Punta Quebraolas.	42°02.2′S 72°38.6′W	Fl.W. period 5s fl. 1s, ec. 4s	66 20 6	White fiberglass tower, red band	13.	Visible 305°-163°.
324	1672; G 1690	Río Negro.	41°58.2′S 72°28.5′W	Fl.W. period 10s fl. 0.5s, ec. 9.5s	23 7 9	White fiberglass tower, red bands	13.	Visible 280°-090°.
325	1675; G 1657	Estero Huequi.	42°14.6′S 72°46.0′W	Fl.W. period 5s fl. 0.4s, ec. 4.6s	33 10 3	White tower, red band	11.	Visible 060°-340°.
326	1676; G 1656	Punta Chulao.	42°17.9′S 72°50.0′W	Fl.W. period 10s fl. 0.5s, ec. 9.5s	98 30 9	White concrete tower, red band	33.	Visible 357°-220°.
327	1680; G 1652.2	Caleta Ayacara.	42°19.2′S 72°47.3′W	Fl.(3)R. period 9s fl. 0.3s, ec. 1.7s fl. 0.3s, ec. 1.7s fl. 0.3s, ec. 4.7s	26 8 5	Red fiberglass tower	11.	Visible 010°-202°.
328	1684; G 1652	Caleta Buill.	42°25.3′S 72°42.3′W	Fl.R. period 5s fl. 0.4s, ec. 4.6s	20 6 4	Red fiberglass tower	11.	Visible 045°-119°.
329	1688; G 1651	Poza de Chumildén.	42°30.7′S 72°49.2′W	Fl.W. period 5s fl. 0.4s, ec. 4.6s	121 37 7	White fiberglass tower, red band	13.	Visible 020°-222°.
330	1692; G 1664	Península Guapilinao.	41°57.4′S 73°31.7′W	Fl.G. period 5s fl. 0.4s, ec. 4.6s	170 52 5	Green fiberglass tower	11.	Visible 012°-343°.
331	1696; G 1662.5	Morro Lobos, Isla Caucahue.	42°06.4′S 73°23.5′W	Fl.W. period 12s fl. 1s, ec. 11s	249 76 11	White fiberglass tower, red band	13.	Visible 080°-087° and 090°- 345°.
332	1704; G 1662	Quemchi, mole, head.	42°08.7′S 73°28.8′W	Fl.(4)G. period 12s fl. 0.5s, ec. 1.5s fl. 0.5s, ec. 1.5s fl. 0.5s, ec. 1.5s fl. 0.5s, ec. 5.5s	13 4 8	Green fiberglass tower	11.	
333	1705; G 1661.4	Rocas Peligro.	42°15.4′S 73°18.0′W	Fl.R. period 5s fl. 0.4s, ec. 4.6s	23 7 4	Red conical steel piling, red round daymark	21.	
334	1706; G 1661	Piedra Lilecura.	42°15.5′S 73°19.8′W	Fl.G. period 5s fl. 0.4s, ec. 4.6s	20 6 4	Green round steel piling, green can daymark	18.	
335	1708; G 1655	Punta Tugnao.	42°17.0′S 73°03.8′W	Fl.W. period 15s fl. 1s, ec. 14s	40 12 11	White fiberglass tower, red band	13.	Visible 160°-334°.
336	1712; G 1654	Canal Anihue, Isla Mechuque.	42°18.8′S 73°16.3′W	Fl.G. period 3s fl. 0.3s, ec. 2.7s	29 9 5	Green fiberglass tower	13.	Visible 004°-073°.
337	1716; G 1653	Punta Tenaún.	42°21.0′S 73°22.0′W	Fl.W. period 5s fl. 0.4s, ec. 4.6s	19 6 8	White fiberglass tower, red band	13.	Visible 195°-071°.
338	1720; G 1647.5	Rada Quetalco.	42°20.0′S 73°33.0′W	Fl.G. period 10s fl. 0.5s, ec. 9.5s	20 6 5	PORT (B) G, fiberglass tower.		Visible 294°-030°.

== Dalcahue Channel ==
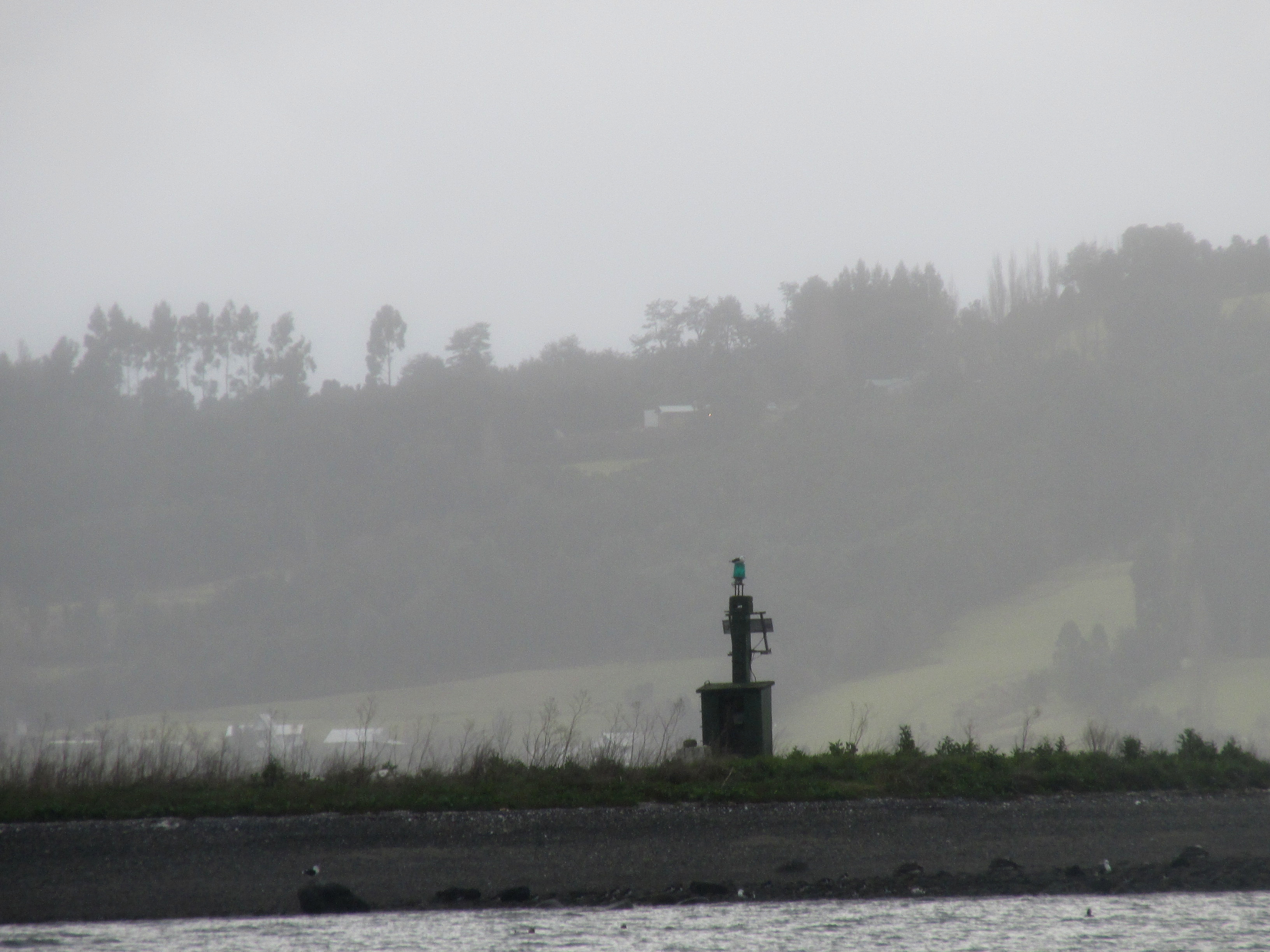
Yal Islet Lighthouse

It.	NGA/Int number	Location	Coordinates	Light characteristic	Height (ft/m) Range (nmi)	Structure description	Height (ft)	Remarks
339	1724; G 1647	Dalcahue, pier, root.	42°23.0′S 73°39.0′W	Fl.G. period 3s fl. 0.3s, ec. 2.7s	26 8 7	Green fiberglass tower	13.	
340	1728; G 1646	Bunocoihue Point Range, front.	42°23.0′S 73°40.0′W	Fl.W. period 5s fl. 1s, ec. 4s	42 13 8	White fiberglass tower, red band	13.	Visible 220°-045°.
341	1732; G 1646.1	Rear, about 328 meters 339° from front.	42°23.4′S 73°40.4′W	Fl.W. period 5s fl. 1s, ec. 4s	72 22 10	White fiberglass tower, red band	26.	Visible 329°-349°.
342	1736; G 1644	Punta Chulequehue Range, front.	42°26.0′S 73°39.0′W	Fl.W. period 5s fl. 1s, ec. 4s	35 11 8	White fiberglass tower, red band	13.	Visible 138°-226° and 262°- 320°.
343	1740; G 1644.1	-Rear, about 200 meters 159° from front.	42°25.9′S 72°38.9′W	Fl.W. period 5s fl. 1s, ec. 4s	105 32 10	White fiberglass tower, red band	13.	Visible 149°-169°.
344	1744; G 1642	Curaco de Vélez.	42°26.0′S 73°37.0′W	Q.(9)W. period 15s	30 9 5	Yellow fiberglass column, black stripe on concrete base	28.	
345	1748; G 1647.7	Punta Palqui, NE. end of Isla Quinchao.	42°24.3′S 73°30.7′W	Fl.W. period 10s fl. 0.5s, ec. 9.5s	85 26 7	White fiberglass tower, red band	13.	Visible 128°-048°.
346	1752; G 1648	Achao, root of pier.	42°28.0′S 73°30.0′W	Fl.G. period 5s fl. 1s, ec. 4s	20 6 9	Green metal pillar	11.	
347	1756; G 1649	Isla Tuequelín, E. end.	42°27.8′S 73°14.2′W	Fl.(3)W. period 9s fl. 0.5s, ec. 1.5s fl. 0.5s, ec. 1.5s fl. 0.5s, ec. 4.5s	141 43 7	White fiberglass tower, red band	13.	Visible 129°-358°.
348	1760; G 1640	Punta Aguantao.	42°32.0′S 73°35.0′W	Fl.(4)W. period 12s fl. 0.5s, ec. 1.5s fl. 0.5s, ec. 1.5s fl. 0.5s, ec. 1.5s fl. 0.5s, ec. 5.5s	23 7 7	White fiberglass tower, red band	13.	Visible 179°-050°.
349	1764; G 1636.5	Punta Ánimo.	42°32.2′S 73°47.3′W	Fl.W. period 5s fl. 0.4s, ec. 4.6s	33 10 5	White fiberglass tower, red band	33.	Visible 247°-097°.
350	1768; G 1637	Punta Peuque, Isla de Chiloé.	42°31.4′S 73°47.1′W	Fl.R. period 5s fl. 0.4s, ec. 4.6s	23 7 3	Red fiberglass tower	11.	Visible 018°-255°.
351	1776; G 1638	Puerto Castro.	42°28.7′S 73°45.5′W	Fl.R. period 5s fl. 0.4s, ec. 4.6s	33 10 7	Red fiberglass tower	20.	Aero Radiobeacon 0.8 mile N.
352	1780; G 1636	Isla Linlinao.	42°34.4′S 73°44.8′W	Fl.W. period 5s fl. 1s, ec. 4s	125 38 8	White fiberglass tower, red band	18.	Visible 172°-057°.
353	1784; G 1634	Isla de Chiloé, Chonchi, mole, head.	42°37.1′S 73°46.2′W	Fl.R. period 5s fl. 1s, ec. 4s	20 6 8	Red fiberglass tower	11.	
354	1788; G 1632	Islote Yal.	42°39.6′S 73°39.4′W	Fl.G. period 10s fl. 0.5s, ec. 9.5s	30 9 6	Green square concrete tower	14.	
355	1792; G 1630	Isla Quehui, SW. point.	42°38.8′S 73°31.6′W	Fl.W. period 5s fl. 0.4s, ec. 4.6s	194 59 7	White concrete tower, red band	18.	Visible 278°-174°.
356	1796; G 1631	Huillo, E. side of entrance to Estero Pindo.	42°37.1′S 73°30.0′W	Fl.G. period 5s fl. 0.4s, ec. 4.6s	28 8 4	Green fiberglass tower	18.	Visible 095°-125°.
357	1798; G 1649.5	Caleta Cheguian.	42°34.8′S 73°24.1′W	Fl.W. period 5s fl. 1s, ec. 4s	16 5 9	White fiberglass tower, red band	11.	Visible 356°-098°.
358	1800; G 1628	Isla Imelev.	42°37.0′S 73°24.2′W	Fl.(2)W.R. period 6s fl. 0.3s, ec. 1.7s fl. 0.3s, ec. 3.7s	170 52 W. 6 R. 4	White fiberglass tower, red band	26.	W. 087°-198°, R.-232°, W.- 058°, R.-087°.
359	1804; G 1624	Isla Chaulinec, near SE. point.	42°39.5′S 73°14.5′W	Fl.W. period 5s fl. 0.1s, ec. 4.9s	82 25 13	White round concrete tower, red bands	25.	Visible 218°-087°.
360	1808; G 1625	Tres Redes.	42°37.6′S 73°17.9′W	Fl.(3)W. period 9s fl. 0.5s, ec. 1.5s fl. 0.5s, ec. 1.5s fl. 0.5s, ec. 4.5s	23 7 6	White fiberglass tower, red band	11.	Visible 093°-277°.
361	1812; G 1623.5	Isla Chulín.	42°37.0′S 73°03.9′W	Fl.W. period 10s fl. 0.5s, ec. 9.5s	33 10 7	White fiberglass tower, red band	13.	Visible 315°-176°.
362	1816; G 1650	Punta Tengo.	42°37.2′S 72°51.1′W	Fl.W. period 12s fl. 1s, ec. 11s	23 7 8	White fiberglass tower, red band	13.	Visible 005°-196°.

== See also ==
- List of fjords, channels, sounds and straits of Chile
- List of islands of Chile
