= List of lighthouses in Chile: NGA1080–NGA1155.5 =

This is a list of lighthouses in Chile from Arica to Easter Island.

== Arica ==
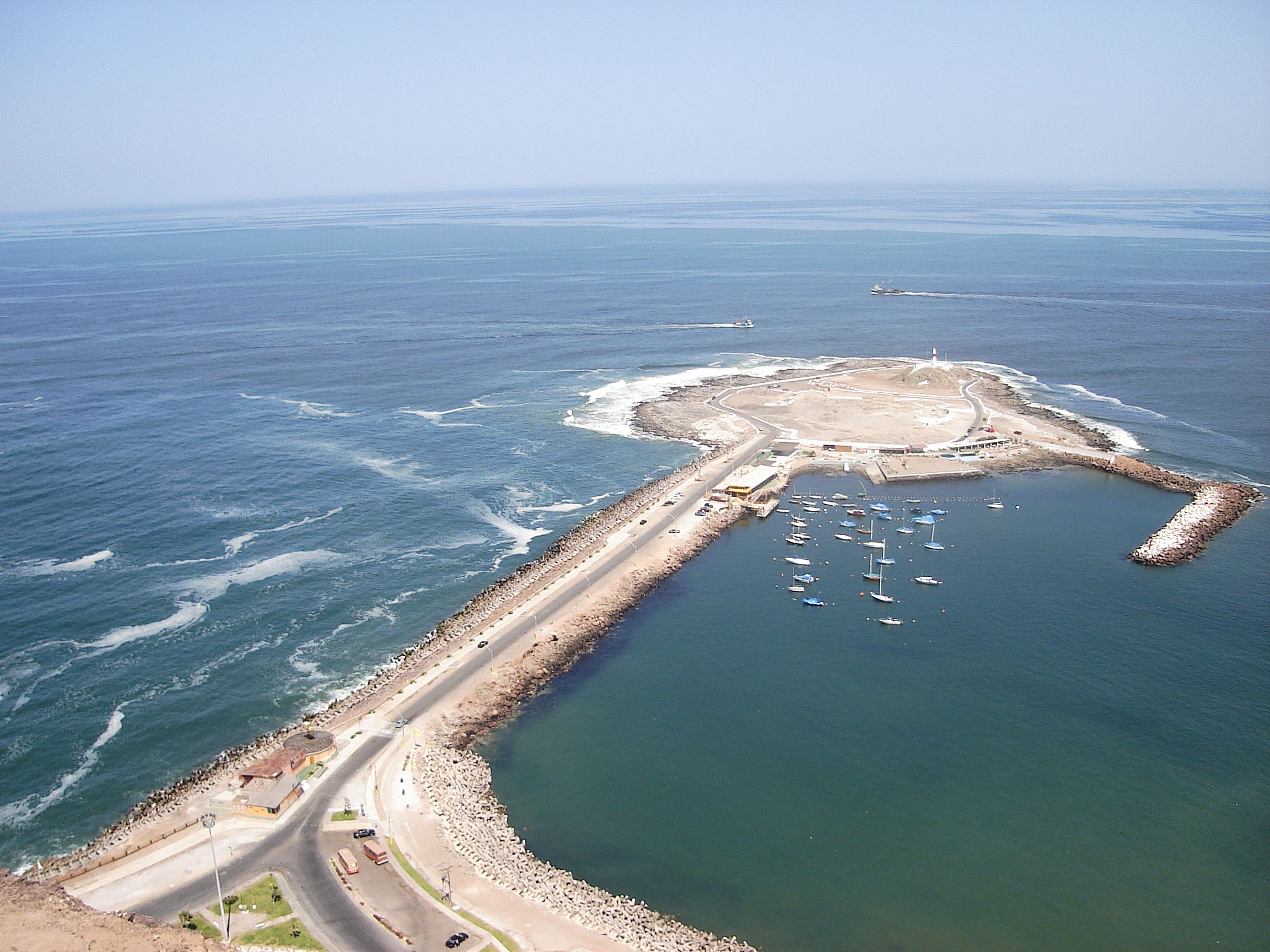
Lighthouse in (former) Alacrán Island, now a breakwater

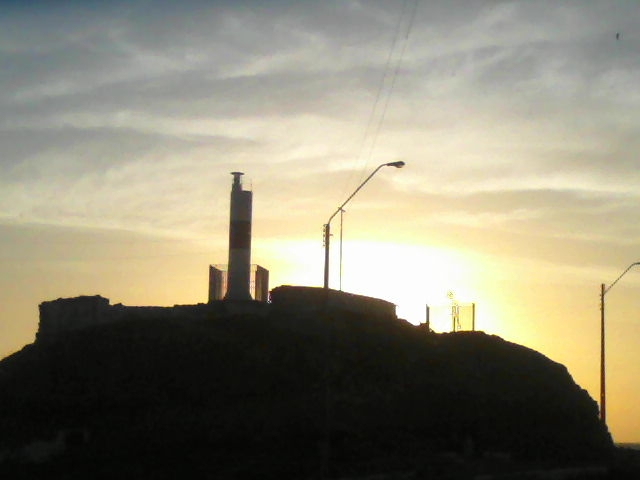
Lighthouse in (former) Alacrán Island, now a breakwater

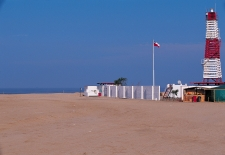
Concordia lighthouse at the border to Perú

It.	NGA/Int number	Location	Coordinates	Light characteristic	Height (ft/m) Range (nmi)	Structure description	Height (ft)	Remarks
1	1080; G 1987	Concordia.	18°20.6′S 70°22′W	Dir.Fl.G. period 5s fl. 0.3s, ec. 4.7s	138 42 14	White truncated pyramidal iron tower, square base, red bands	64.	Visible 350°-240°. Fl.R. obstruction light on top of tower. Radar reflector. Aero Radiobeacon 2.2 miles ESE.
2	1010; G 1986.4	Breakwater.	18°28.6′S 70°19.6′W	Fl.(3)R. period 9s fl. 0.5s, ec. 1.5s fl. 0.5s, ec. 1.5s fl. 0.5s, ec. 4.5s	23 7 4	Red fiberglass pillar	8.	Visible 097°-179°.
3	1012; G 1984	Isla Alacrán.	18°28.6′S 70°19.9′W	Fl.W. period 15s fl. 0.5s, ec. 14.5s	75 23 19	White fiberglass tower, red band	26.	F.R. lights on radio masts 1.1 miles NE., 2.1 miles ENE., 0.9 mile E. and 0.9 mile SE.
4	1016; G 1985	N. breakwater, head.	18°28.2′S 70°19.4′W	Fl.G. period 5s fl. 0.4s, ec. 4.6s	23 7 7	Green fiberglass tower	13.	
5	1020; G 1986	Breakwater, head.	18°27.9′S 70°19.5′W	Fl.R. period 5s fl. 0.3s, ec. 4.7s	66 20 14	Red round concrete tower	39.	
6	1028; G 1978	Punta Pichalo.	19°35.9′S 70°14.0′W	Fl.W. period 12s fl. 0.3s, ec. 11.7s	180 55 13	White fiberglass tower, red band	13.	Visible 309°-221°.

== Iquique ==
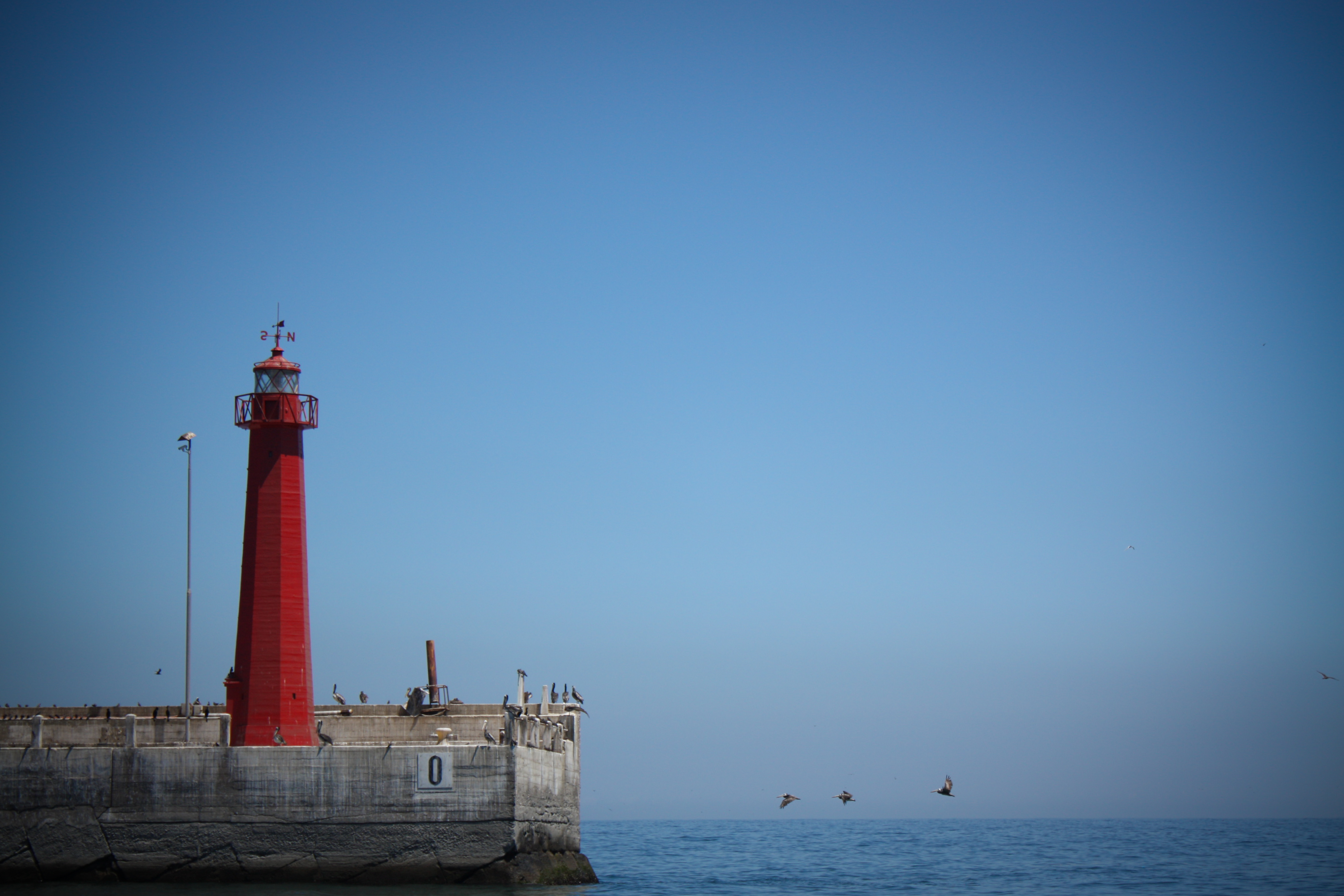
Lighthouse on the breakwater of Iquique

It.	NGA/Int number	Location	Coordinates	Light characteristic	Height (ft/m) Range (nmi)	Structure description	Height (ft)	Remarks
7	1036; G 1968	Breakwater head.	20°12.0′S 70°09.5′W	Fl.R. period 10s fl. 0.3s, ec. 9.7s	62 19 14	Red conical concrete tower, red triangular daymark	44.	
8	1040; G 1969	Espigón de Atraque, NE. corner.	20°12.2′S 70°09.4′W	F.R.	34 10 1	White post, white triangular daymark, red border	18.	
9	1042; G 1969.2	NW. corner.	20°12.2′S 70°09.4′W	F.G.	30 9 1	White post, white triangular daymark, red border	13.	
10	1048; G 1972	Patilliguaje Rock.	20°12.4′S 70°09.3′W	Fl.(2+1)G. period 14s fl. 0.3s, ec. 1.7s fl. 0.3s, ec. 3.7s fl. 0.3s, ec. 7.7s	16 5 5			PREFERRED CHANNEL (B) GRG, tower; 11.
11	1050; G 1974.3	Serrano Peninsula.	20°12.4′S 70°09.6′W	Fl.W. period 12s fl. 0.3s, ec. 11.7s	128 39 19	White round metal tower, red bands	72.	
12	1060; G 1974	Range, front, passenger mole, head.	20°12.6′S 70°09.3′W	F.R.	3	Red post, white bands, white triangular topmark	20.	
13	1064; G 1974.1	Rear, 43 meters 197° from front.	20°12.7′S 70°09.3′W	F.R.	3	Red post, white bands, white triangular topmark	13.	
14	1072; G 1964	Punta Gruesa.	20°21.7′S 70°10.8′W	Fl.W. period 10s fl. 0.3s, ec. 9.7s	89 27 14	White pyramidal concrete tower, blue base	33.	Visible 004°-205°.
15	1076; G 1963	Punta Patillos.	20°45.2′S 70°11.9′W	Fl.W. period 5s fl. 0.3s, ec. 4.7s	135 41 13	White fiberglass tower, red bands	13.	Visible 348°-063° and 073°- 186°.21
16	1078; G 1961	Punta Chomache.	21°07.5′S 70°08.0′W	Fl.W. period 10s fl. 0.5s, ec. 9.5s	49 15 5	White fiberglass pillar, red band	11.	Visible 330°-208°.
17	1080; G 1960	Punta Falsa Chipana.	21°20.5′S 70°05.3′W	Fl.W. period 15s fl. 0.7s, ec. 14.3s	20 6 8	White fiberglass pillar, red bands	8.	Visible 347°-246°.
18	1084; G 1958	Muelle S.I.T., head.	22°05.6′S 70°13.8′W	2 F.W.	39 12 3	Metal post	22.	One on each side of head. Private light.
19	1096; G 1956	Punta Algodonales.	22°05.7′S 70°13.1′W	Fl.W. period 12s fl. 0.4s, ec. 11.6s	79 24 16	White fiberglass tower, red band	26.	Visible 048°-041°.

== Mejillones ==
It.	NGA/Int number	Location	Coordinates	Light characteristic	Height (ft/m) Range (nmi)	Structure description	Height (ft)	Remarks
20	1097; G 1952.1	Vopack Oxiquim Terminal Range No. 1, front.	23°06.0′S 70°28.6′W	Fl.W. period 3s fl. 1s, ec. 2s	55 17 6	Metal post, white rectangular daymark, orange stripe	18.	Visible 162°-270°.
21	1097.1; G 1952.2	Rear No. 2, 411 meters 245° from front.	23°06.1′S 70°28.8′W	Fl.W. period 3s fl. 1s, ec. 2s	80 24 6	Metal post, white rectangular daymark, orange stripe	39.	Visible 165°-265°.
22	1098; G 1953	Puerto Mejillones del Sur.	23°05.9′S 70°27.2′W	Fl.G. period 3s fl. 1s, ec. 2s	66 20 6	Balcony of Harbor Master's office	59.	Visible 038°-326°.
23	1099; G 1954.3	No. 3, Range, common front.	23°05.6′S 70°25.6′W	Fl.G. period 3s fl. 1s, ec. 2s	55 17 5	Metal post, white rectangular daymark, orange stripe	18.	Visible 088°-245°.
24	1099.1; G 1954.2	Rear, No. 4, 391 meters 168° from front.	23°05.8′S 70°25.6′W	Fl.G. period 3s fl. 1s, ec. 2s	96 29 5	Metal post, white rectangular daymark, orange stripe	28.	Visible 086°-234°.
25	1099.2; G 1954.4	Rear, No. 5, 391 meters 163° from front.	23°05.8′S 70°25.6′W	Fl.G. period 3s fl. 1s, ec. 2s	96 29 5	Metal post, white rectangular daymark, orange stripe	26.	Visible 086°-234°.
26	1100; G 1954	On tower.	23°06.5′S 70°26.5′W			Q.R. 6 Red iron framework tower, white bands	100.	Obstruction. Aero Radiobeacon.
27	1101; G 1955.1	ENAEX Terminal Range, front.	23°05.6′S 70°25.5′W	F.G.	72 22 4			Occasional.
28	1101.5; G 1955.11	Rear, 150 meters 199° from front.	23°05.7′S 70°25.5′W	F.R.	72 22 4			Occasional.
29	1102; G 1955.2	Puerto Mejilliones SA Terminal Range, front.	23°05.2′S 70°25.0′W	F.G.	33 10 4			Occasional.
30	1102.5; G 1955.21	Rear, 200 meters 146° from front.	23°05.3′S 70°24.9′W	F.R.	66 20 4			Occasional.
31	1102.6; G 1955.25	On chimney.	23°05.3′S 70°24.7′W	Fl.R. period 2s	148 45 8			
32	1103; G 1955.3	Interacid Terminal Range, front.	23°04.8′S 70°23.9′W	Q.R.	62 19 4			Occasional.
33	1103.5; G 1955.31	Rear, 120 meters 181° from front.	23°04.9′S 70°23.9′W	Fl.R. period 2s	79 24 4			Occasional.
34	1103.6; G 1955.35	E.	23°04.9′S 70°23.1′W	F.R.	282 86 5			
35	1104; G 1955.4	Puerto Angamos Terminal Range, front.	23°04.2′S 70°23.1′W	Q.R.	98 30 4			
36	1104.5; G 1955.41	Rear, 180 meters 130° from front.	23°04.3′S 70°23.0′W	F.R.	115 35 4			
37	1105; G 1955.54	Range, front.	23°04.2′S 70°23.0′W	Q.R.	85 26 4	White metal framework tower, triangular daymark, point up, orange band	16.	Visible 061°-210°. Private light.
38	1105.5; G 1955.535	Common Rear.	23°04.2′S 70°22.9′W	F.R.	121 37 4	White metal framework tower, triangular daymark, point down, orange band	20.	Visible 068°-203°. Private light.
39	1105.6; G 1955.53	Range, front.	23°04.1′S 70°22.9′W	Q.R.	85 26 4	White metal framework tower, triangular daymark, point up, orange band	16.	Visible 060°-221°. Private light.
40	1106; G 1955.52	N. Mole.	23°03.9′S 70°23.3′W	Fl.R. period 3s fl. 1s, ec. 2s	26 8 5	Red metal framework tower, red triangular daymark, point up	13.	Visible 052°-231°. Private light.
41	1107; G 1955.51	S. Mole.	23°04.0′S 70°23.3′W	Fl.G. period 3s fl. 1s, ec. 2s	26 8 5	Green metal framework tower, square daymark	13.	Visible 052°-231°. Private light.
42	1108; G 1952	Punta Angamos.	23°01.6′S 70°31.0′W	Fl.W. period 10s fl. 0.3s, ec. 9.7s	358 109 14	White fiberglass tower, red band	26.	Visible 036°-267°.
43	1109	LNG Terminal.	23°03.0′S 70°22.5′W	L.Fl.W. period 8s fl. 3s, ec. 5s	33 10 10	Iron post, white rectangular daymark, red band	16.	
44	1110	LNG North Range No. 1, front.	23°03.3′S 70°22.0′W	Fl.G. period 3s fl. 1s, ec. 2s	110 34 5	Gray iron post, white rectangular daymark, orange stripe	21.	Visible 280°-033°.
45	1110.5	Rear No. 2, 180 meters 130° from front.	23°03.3′S 70°21.9′W	Fl.G. period 3s fl. 1s, ec. 2s	140 43 5	Gray iron post, white rectangular daymark, orange stripe	25.	Visible 234°-030°.
46	1111	LNG South Range No. 3, front.	23°03.5′S 70°22.2′W	Fl.R. period 3s fl. 1s, ec. 2s	107 33 5	Gray iron post, white rectangular daymark, orange stripe	22.	Visible 233°-035°.
47	1111.5	Rear No. 4, 180 meters 130° from front.	23°03.5′S 70°22.1′W	Fl.R. period 3s fl. 1s, ec. 2s	138 42 5	Gray iron post, white rectangular daymark, orange stripe	36.	Visible 236°-031°.
48	1112; G 1948	Punta Tetas.	23°31.2′S 70°37.3′W	Fl.W. period 18s fl. 0.6s, ec. 17.4s	108 33 15	White fiberglass tower, red bands	26.	Visible 287°-166°.
49	1116; G 1947.7	Cerro Moreno AVIATION LIGHT.	23°27.0′S 70°26.0′W	Al.Fl.W.G. period 11s	13			Occasional.
50	1117.12	Shell Anchorage starboard Range, front.	23°36.7′S 70°23.5′W	Q.G.	43 13 4	White metal post, white triangular daymark, red stripe	32.	Visible 043°-150°.
51	1117.13	Common rear.	23°36.7′S 70°23.4′W	F.G.	52 16 4	White metal post, white triangular daymark, red stripe	16.	Visible 043°-150°; 95 meters 079° from front port; 95 meters 070° from front starboard.
52	1118	Shell Terminal Range, front.	23°37.2′S 70°23.5′W	F.R.	59 18 6	White metal post, white triangular daymark, red stripe	41.	Visible 040°-180°.
53	1118.1	Rear, 240 meters 132° from front.	23°37.3′S 70°23.4′W	F.R.	98 30 6	White metal post, white triangular daymark, red stripe	41.	Visible 040°-180°.

== Antofagasta ==
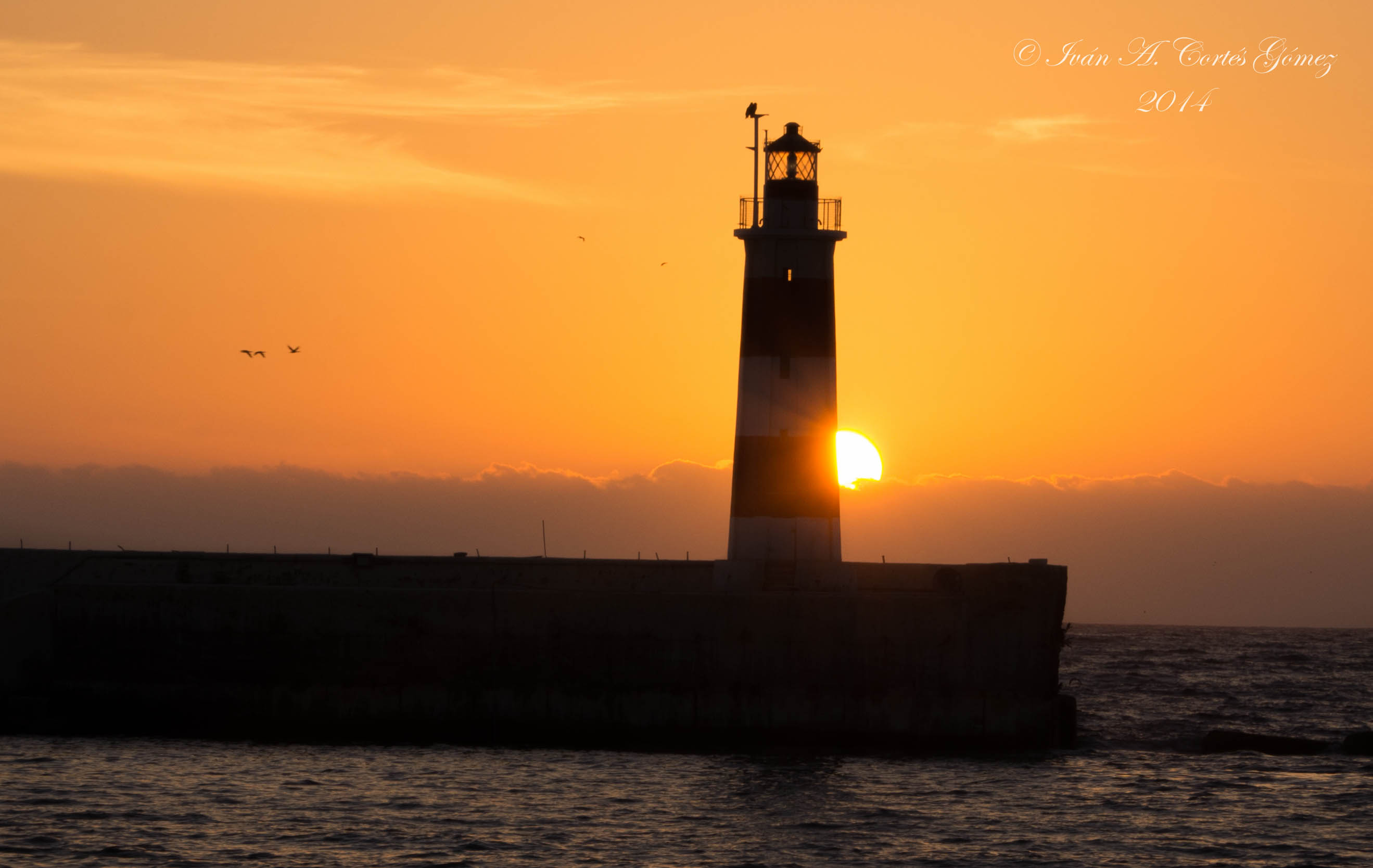
Molo de Abrigo Lighthouse, Antofagasta

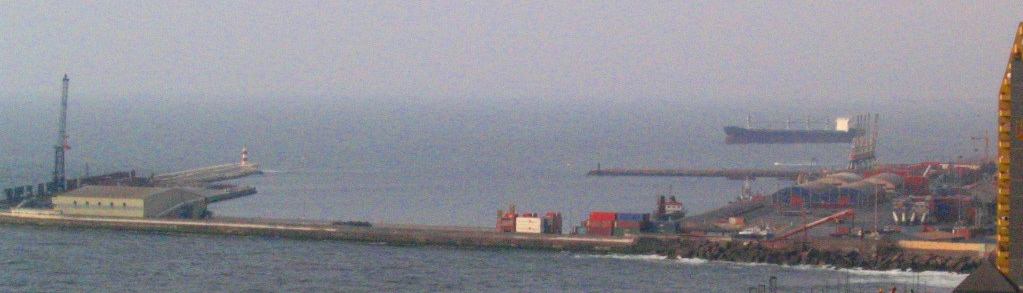
Lighthouse in harbour of Antofagsta

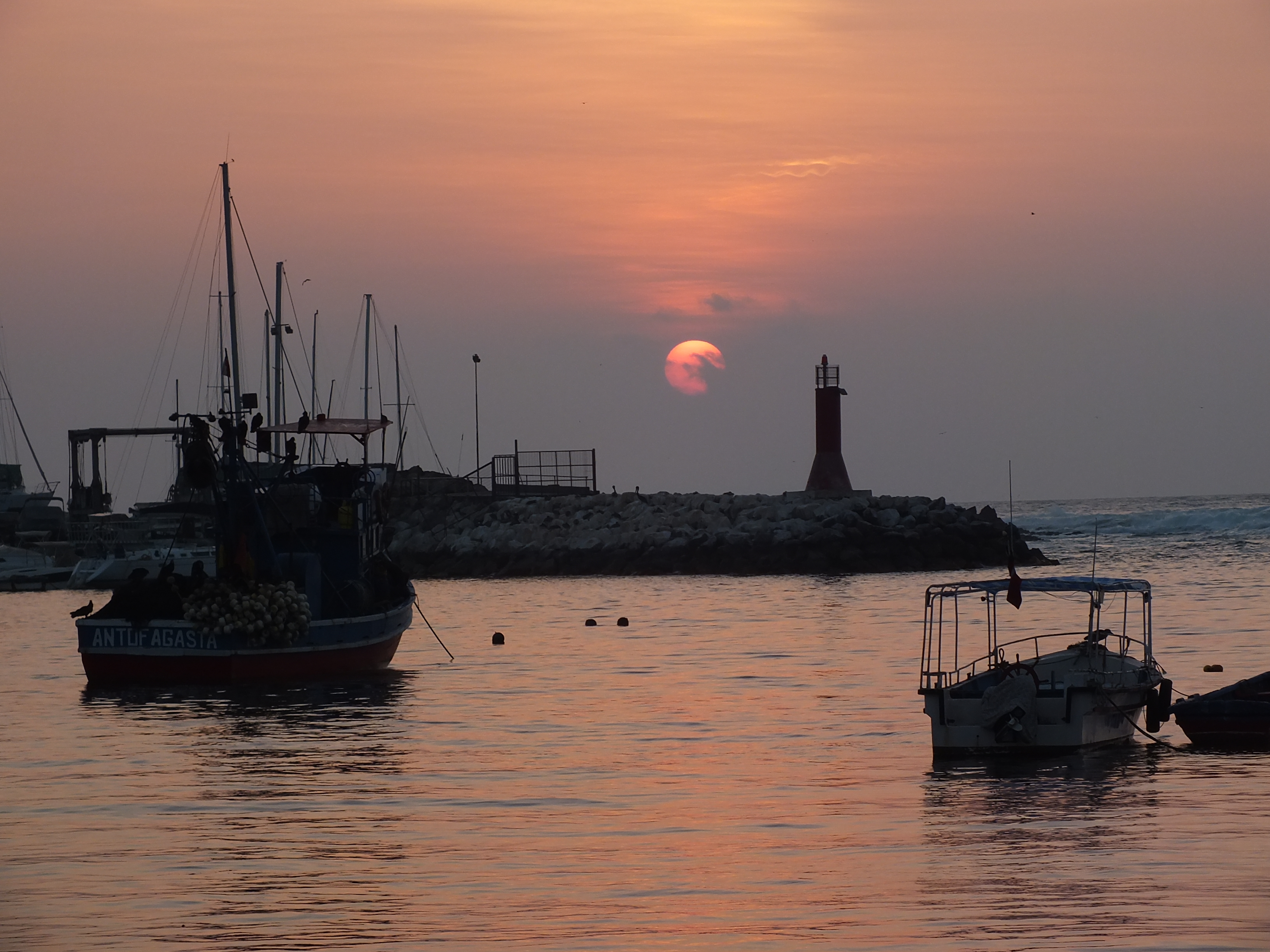
Probably Club de Yates Lighthouse

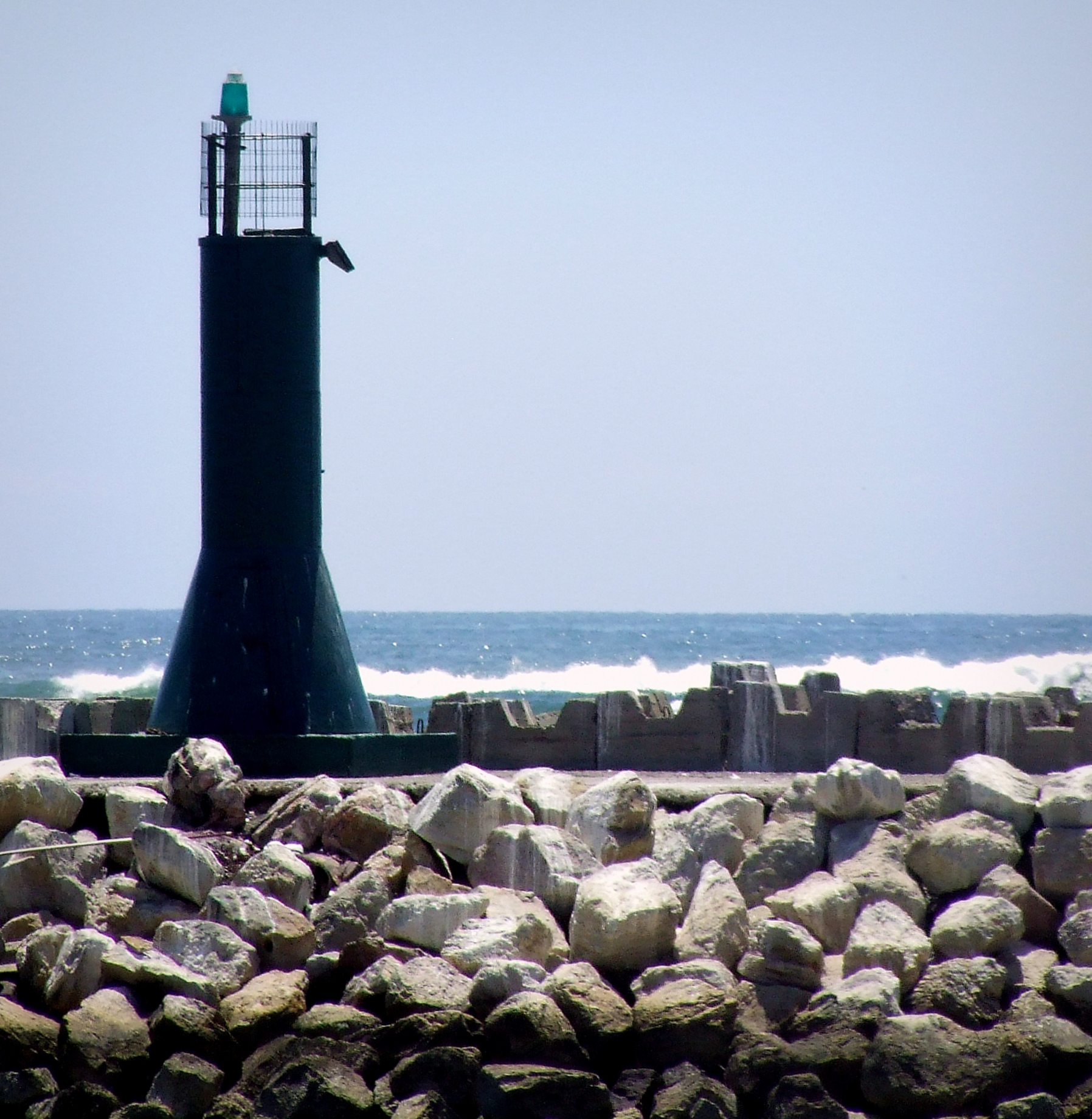
Probably SOCOPESCA Lighthouse

It.	NGA/Int number	Location	Coordinates	Light characteristic	Height (ft/m) Range (nmi)	Structure description	Height (ft)	Remarks
54	1120; G 1947	Este, mole.	23°38.7′S 70°24.4′W	Fl.G. period 5s fl. 1s, ec. 4s	20 6 8	Green fiberglass tower	13.	Visible 263°-260°.
55	1124; G 1946	Molo de Abrigo.	23°38.6′S 70°24.6′W	Fl.W. period 5s fl. 0.3s, ec. 4.7s	59 18 19	White round concrete tower, red bands	43.	Visible 010°-190°.
56	1125	Darsena Range, front.	23°39.2′S 70°24.3′W	F.R.	66 20 7	White metal post, white rectangular daymark, red stripe	66.	
57	1125.5	Rear, 79.8 meters 165° from front.	23°39.2′S 70°24.3′W	F.R.	82 25 7	White metal post, white rectangular daymark, red stripe	82.	
58	1126; G 1947.2	Molo Socopesca.	23°38.5′S 70°24.9′W	Fl.(4)G. period 12s fl. 0.3s, ec. 1.7s fl. 0.3s, ec. 1.7s fl. 0.3s, ec. 1.7s fl. 0.3s, ec. 5.7s	26 8 6	Green fiberglass tower	16.	
59	1126.5; G 1947.3	Club de Yates.	23°38.5′S 70°24.0′W	Fl.(4)R. period 12s fl. 0.3s, ec. 1.7s fl. 0.3s, ec. 1.7s fl. 0.3s, ec. 1.7s fl. 0.3s, ec. 5.7s	26 8 6	Red fiberglass tower	16.	
60	1127; G 1940	Caleta Coloso.	23°45.5′S 70°28.0′W	Fl.(3)W. period 12s fl. 0.3s, ec. 1.7s fl. 0.3s, ec. 1.7s fl. 0.3s, ec. 7.7s	118 36 15	White rectangular metal framework tower, red bands	67.	Visible 060°-270°. RACON O(– – –) 10
61	1128; G 1938	Punta Ballenita.	25°46.5′S 70°43.5′W	Fl.W. period 10s fl. 0.5s, ec. 9.5s	157 48 9	White fiberglass tower, red bands	13.	Visible 003°-009° and 010°- 241°.
62	1129; G 1937	Isla San Félix.	26°17.0′S 80°07.8′W	Fl.W. period 12s fl. 1s, ec. 11s	640 195 10	White fiberglass tower, red bands	13.	
63	1130; G 1936	Punta Achurra.	26°17.9′S 70°39.7′W	Fl.W. period 15s fl. 0.5s, ec. 14.5s	105 32 10	White fiberglass tower, red band	26.	Visible 330°-150°.

== Chañaral ==
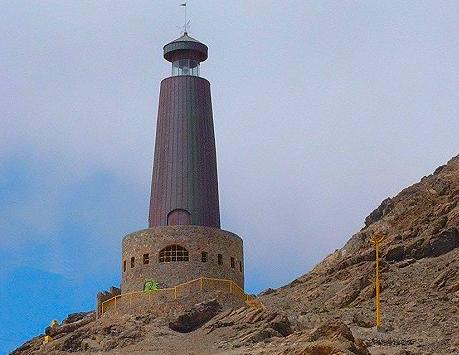
Monumental lighthouse of Chañaral

It.	NGA/Int number	Location	Coordinates	Light characteristic	Height (ft/m) Range (nmi)	Structure description	Height (ft)	Remarks
65	1132; G 1935	Muelle Mecanizado Santa Fe, Punta Piedra Blanca.	26°21.0′S 70°39.0′W	F.R.	82 25 4			Loading tower.
66	1136; G 1934.5	Mole Barquito.	26°21.0′S 70°39.0′W	F.R.	75 23 3			
67	1140	Anchorage Ranges, near Punta Piedra Blanca.	26°21.4′S 70°39.6′W	4 F.R.	3			2 pairs of range lights (110° and 200°) mark anchorage. F.R. obstruction lights when aircraft are expected.
68	1141; G 1932	Monumental Chañaral.	26°20.5′S 70°37.5′W	Fl.W. period 5s fl. 0.7s, ec. 4.3s	272 83 20	Metal framework tower	49.	Visible 072°-142°.
69	1142; G 1925.6	Punta Caleta Range, front.	27°03.3′S 70°50.1′W	F.R.	2	Red triangular daymark	10.	Private light.
70	1143; G 1925.61	Rear, 55 meters 230° from front.	27°03.3′S 70°50.1′W	F.G.	2	Green triangular daymark	10.	Private light.
71	1143.5; G 1930	Punta Totoralillo. RACON	26°51.1′S 70°49.1′W	L.Fl.W. period 8s fl. 3s, ec. 5s T(–)	59 18 12; 14	White round tower, red bands	30.	Visible 033°-290°.

== Caldera ==
It.	NGA/Int number	Location	Coordinates	Light characteristic	Height (ft/m) Range (nmi)	Structure description	Height (ft)	Remarks
72	1144; G 1926	Muelle Fiscal.	27°03.8′S 70°49.6′W	Fl.G. period 3s fl. 1s, ec. 2s	17 5 7	Green round fiberglass tower		
73	1147; G 1924.5	Punta Calderillo.	27°02.9′S 70°48.7′W	Fl.(3)W. period 9s fl. 0.3s, ec. 1.7s fl. 0.3s, ec. 1.7s fl. 0.3s, ec. 4.7s	30 9 4	White fiberglass tower, red band	11.	Visible 325°-128°.
74	1148; G 1924	Punta Caldera.	27°03.1′S 70°51.1′W	Fl.W. period 12s fl. 0.4s, ec. 11.6s	125 38 15	White truncated conical tower, red bands	61.	Visible 020°-278°. Aero Radiobeacon 0.7 mile SSE.
75	1149; G 1924.2	Punta Padrones, NE.	27°03.2′S 70°50.7′W	Fl.W. period 3s	16 5 2			Beacon.
76	1149.5; G 1924.22	SW.	27°03.2′S 70°50.7′W	Fl.W. period 3s	23 7 2			Beacon.
77	1150; G 1923	Punta Caldereta.	27°04.8′S 70°51.6′W	Fl.R. period 5s fl. 0.4s, ec. 4.6s	49 15 3	Red fiberglass tower	11.	Visible 069°-305°.
78	1151; G 1922	Bahía Copiapó, Puerto Viejo.	27°20.4′S 70°56.5′W	Fl.W. period 10s fl. 0.5s, ec. 9.5s	49 15 5	White fiberglass tower, red bands	11.	Visible 045°-270°.

== Isla Salas y Gómez ==
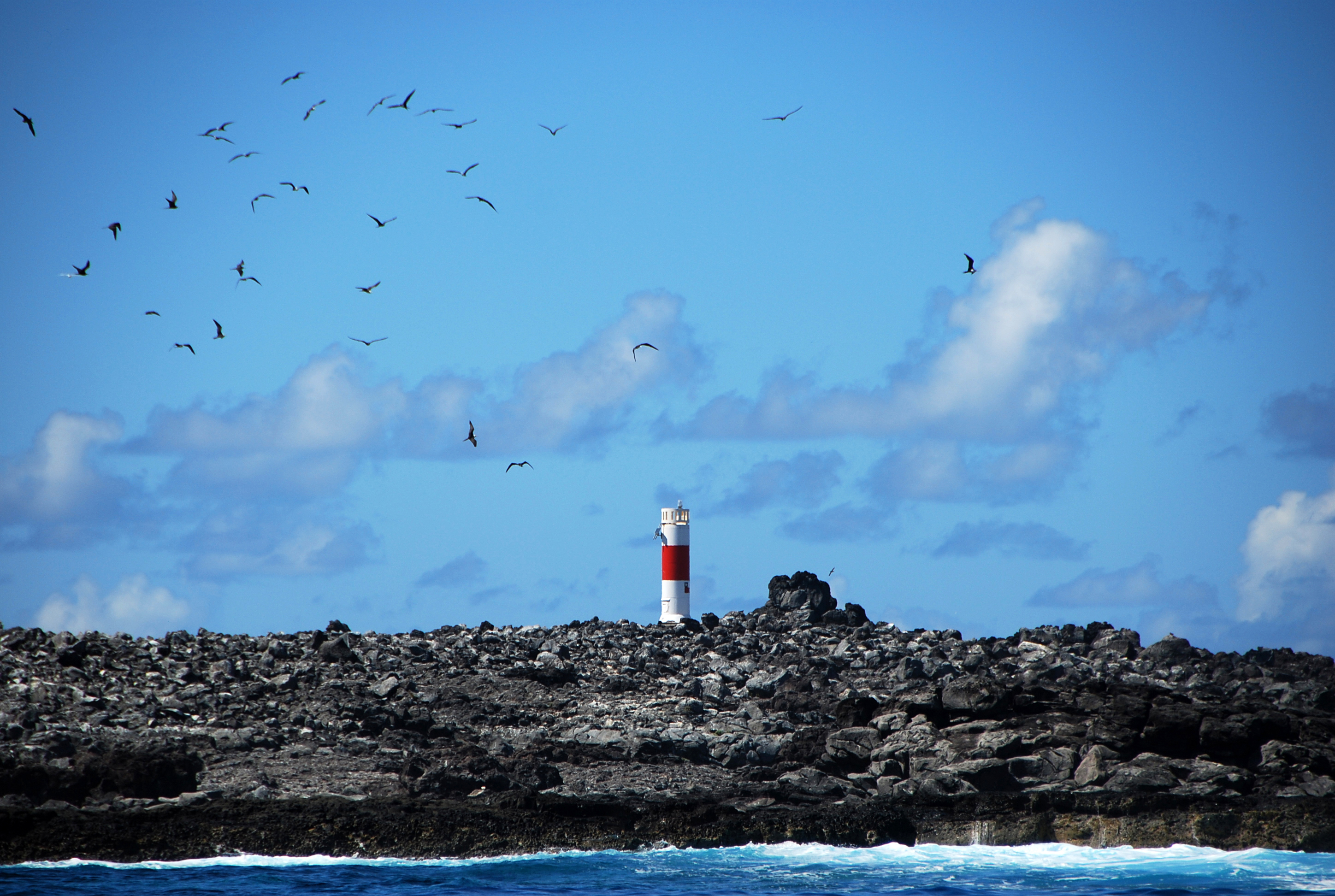
Sala y Gomez lighthouse. It is not registered by NGA, but the Admiralty lists it under number G1990.

(Salas y Gómez lighthouse isn't listed by NGA)

It.	NGA/Int number	Location	Coordinates	Light characteristic	Height (ft/m) Range (nmi)	Structure description	Height (ft)	Remarks
	— G 1990	Isla Salas y Gómez	26°28′25″S 105°21′45″W	Fl.W. period 12s	115 35 ?	White fiberglass column, red band	20	

== Easter Island ==
It.	NGA/Int number	Location	Coordinates	Light characteristic	Height (ft/m) Range (nmi)	Structure description	Height (ft)	Remarks
80	1152; G 1991	Isla de Pascua Range, front.	27°09.3′S 109°26.4′W	Fl.(4)W. period 12s	26 8 6	White concrete column, red band	22.	Visible 078°-136° 30'.
81	1152.1; G 1991.1	Rear, 250 meters 096° from front.	27°09.4′S 109°26.3′W	L.Fl.W. period 8s fl. 3s, ec. 5s	131 40 13	White concrete column, red band	25.	Visible 086°-106°.
82	1152.5; G 1992	Hanga-Roa-Otai.	27°08.9′S 109°26.0′W	Fl.R. period 5s fl. 1s, ec. 4s	20 6 8	White fiberglass tower, red band	11.	Visible 070°-190°.
83	1152.6; G 1993	Hanga-Oua 144°.	27°09.0′S 109°26.0′W	Dir.L.Fl.W. period 8s fl. 3s, ec. 5s	39 12 13	White mast, orange band	13.	Visible 134°-154°.
84	1153; G 1994	La Pérouse, Rada.	27°05.1′S 109°18.0′W	Fl.W. period 5s fl. 0.4s, ec. 4.6s	26 8 5	White fiberglass tower, red band	11.	Visible 159°-260°.
85	1154; G 1994.5	Hotuiti, Caleta.	27°07.3′S 109°17.0′W	Fl.W. period 10s fl. 0.7s, ec. 9.3s	23 7 9	White fiberglass tower, red band	11.	Visible 263°-304°.
86	1155; G 1995	Vaihu, Desembarcadero.	27°09.9′S 109°22.0′W	Fl.W. period 12s fl. 1s, ec. 11s	26 8 9	White fiberglass tower, red band	18.	Visible 264°-060°.
87	1155.5; G 1921.5	Isla Carrizal.	28°04.5′S 71°09.7′W	Fl.(3)W. period 9s fl. 0.3s, ec. 1.7s fl. 0.3s, ec. 1.7s fl. 0.3s, ec. 4.7s	33 10 6	White fiberglass tower, red band	11.	

== See also ==
- Lighthouses in Chile
- List of fjords, channels, sounds and straits of Chile
- List of islands of Chile
