= King Penguin Nature Reserve =

Nature reserve in Chile

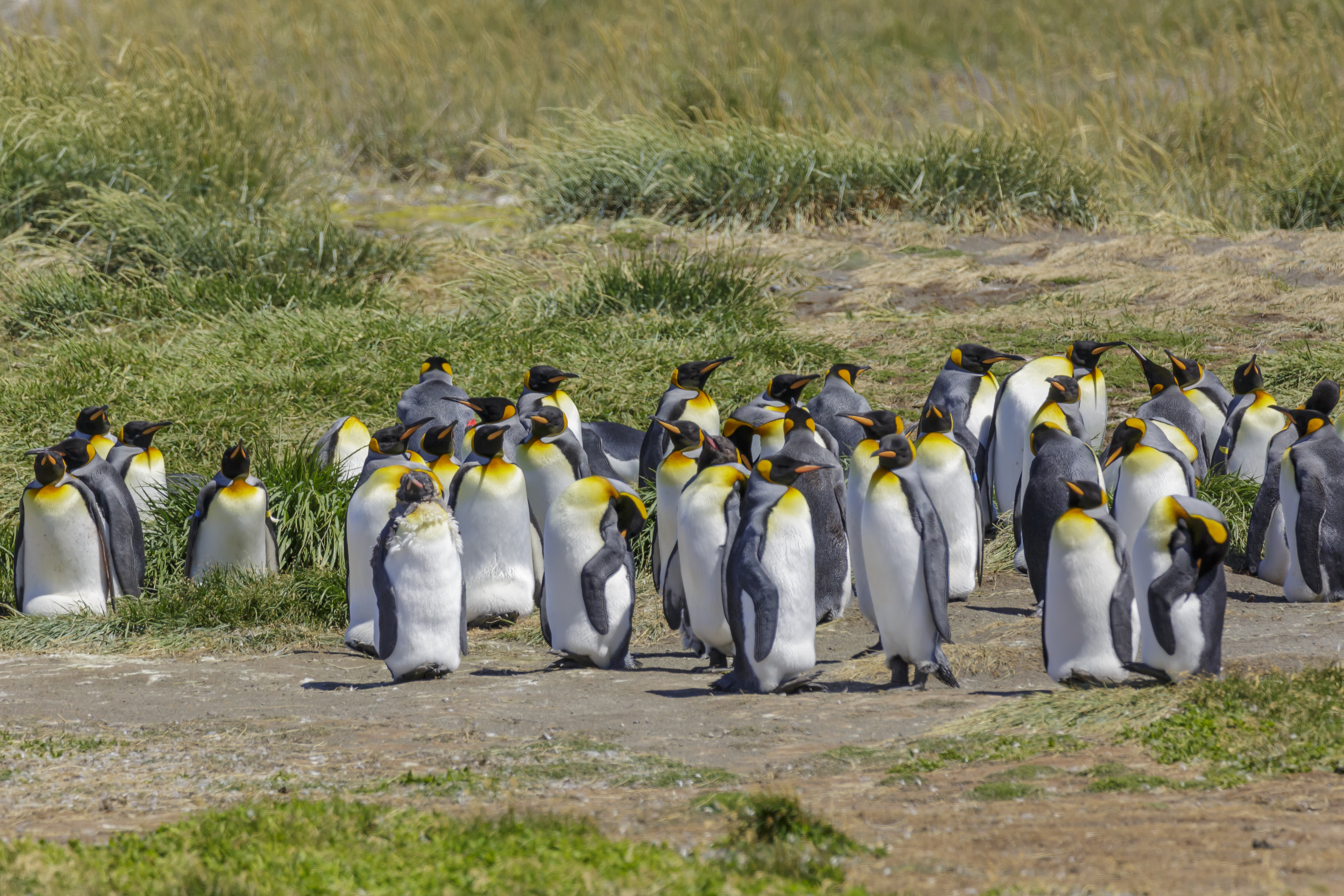
- King penguins (Aptenodytes patagonicus) at the reserve
- Interactive map of King Penguin Nature Reserve
- Location: Magallanes and Chilean Antarctic Region, Chile
- Nearest city: Porvenir
- Coordinates: 53°27′37″S 69°18′23″W
- Governing body: Private management with public-private coordination for wildlife conservation

King Penguin Nature Reserve is a protected area in Chile, designated as a natural reserve, located in the commune of Porvenir, in the Province of Tierra del Fuego, Magallanes and Chilean Antarctic Region. It lies approximately 115 km south of Porvenir, along Inútil Bay, on Route Y-85, which connects the provincial capital to this remote southern area.

This reserve is unique in South America, as it is the only site where visitors can observe a colony of king penguins (Aptenodytes patagonicus) with controlled public access. This contrasts with the Los Pingüinos Natural Monument, located on Magdalena and Marta Islands, where the main species is the Magellanic penguin (Spheniscus magellanicus).

Access to the reserve is by prior appointment and requires payment of an entrance fee. The area offers basic visitor infrastructure, including an information center and designated trails for birdwatching at a safe distance, ensuring the protection of the colony. Management and supervision of the site are carried out by a private entity in a public-private partnership, with support and coordination from public agencies for wildlife conservation. From a tourism standpoint, the reserve is included among the natural sites that make up the End of the World Route.

== Flora ==
The vegetation of the reserve is dominated by Patagonian steppe, with grass species such as Festuca gracillima and Festuca magellanica (locally known as coirones) as the most common components. The area also includes patches of estuarine vegetation and coastal dunes, where plant communities are adapted to sandy and periodically flooded soils. Among the species found in these habitats are Lobelia oligophylla, Boopis australis, Plagiobothrys calandrinioides, and Suaeda argentinensis.
