= Isabel Island (Chile) =

Island in Chile

Native name: Isla Isabel

Geography
- Location: Strait of Magellan
- Coordinates: 52°52′38″S 70°42′46″W
- Highest elevation: 47 m (154 ft)

Administration
- Chile

Isabel Island is an island in the Strait of Magellan. It is located near the western shores of the Strait about 3.5 km east of the narrowest part of Brunswick Peninsula. The island is famous for being the place where large-scale sheepherding was first practiced in Southern Patagonia.

Geologically, the island is part of wider drumlin field that extends on both sides of the strait.

It is served by Marco Davison Bascur Airport.

== See also ==
- Los Pingüinos Natural Monument
- Magdalena Island
