= List of lighthouses in Chile: NGA2328–NGA2718 =

This is a list of lighthouses in Chile from the Strait of Magellan to Paso Picton. It includes a number of Argentine lighthouses that may serve as navigational aids in Chilean waters around Ushuaia and Gable Island.

For Evangelistas Lighthouse, see List of lighthouses in Chile: Messier Channel to Smyth Channel.

== Strait of Magellan (74°-72°W) ==
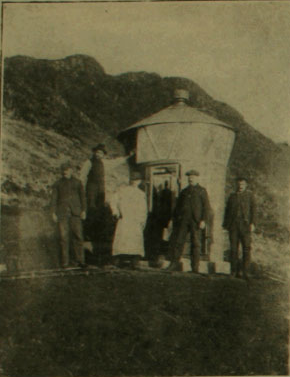
Morrión lighthouse and the workers in a 1916 published photograph

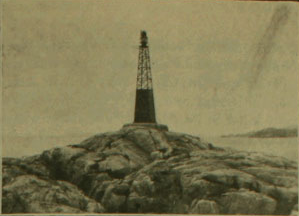
Centinela lighthouse in a 1916 published photograph

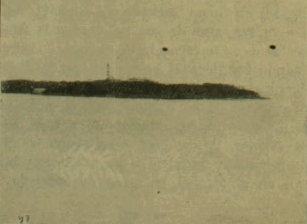
Fenix Island lighthouse in a 1916 published photograph

| It. | NGA/Int number | Location | Coordinates | Light characteristic | Height (ft/m) Range (nmi) | Structure description | Height (ft) | Remarks |
|---|---|---|---|---|---|---|---|---|
| 531 | 2328; G 1478 | Bahía Félix. | 52°57.6′S 74°04.3′W | Fl.W. period 15s fl. 0.2s, ec. 14.8s | 98 30 21 | Round iron tower, red and white bands, white house | 46. | Visible 122°-294°. Signal station. |
| 532 | 2330; G 1477 | Isla Falgate. -RACON | 52°55.0′S 73°50.0′W | Fl.W. period 10s fl. 1s, ec. 9s T(–) period 30s | 72 22 9; 15 | White fiberglass tower, red band | 13. | Visible 296°-167°. |
| 533 | 2332; G 1476 | Isla Centinela, off Cabo Upright. | 53°05.3′S 73°35.3′W | Fl.W. period 5s fl. 0.4s, ec. 4.6s | 72 22 10 | White concrete tower, red bands | 19. | Visible 111°-037°. |
| 534 | 2336; G 1474 | Cabo Cooper Key. | 53°15.2′S 73°12.5′W | Fl.W. period 10s fl. 0.5s, ec. 9.5s | 134 41 7 | White fiberglass tower, red band | 13. | Visible 312°-135°. |
| 535 | 2340; G 1468 | Monte Radford. | 53°24.7′S 72°57.2′W | Fl.W. period 5s fl. 0.4s, ec. 4.6s | 69 21 8 | White round concrete tower, red band | 10. | Visible 124°-309°. |
| 536 | 2342; G 1467.5 | Islote Skinner. | 53°26.0′S 72°49.0′W | Fl.(3)W. period 9s fl. 0.5s, ec. 1.5s fl. 0.5s, ec. 1.5s fl. 0.5s, ec. 4.5s | 16 5 7 | White fiberglass tower, red band | 11. | Visible 300°-131°. |
| 537 | 2345; G 1466.8 | Paso Largo. -RACON | 53°33.0′S 72°36.4′W | Fl.W. period 10s fl. 1s, ec. 9s T(–) period 45s | 26 8 9; 10 | White fiberglass tower, red band | 13. | Visible 129°-158° and 222°- 312°. |
| 538 | 2348; G 1466 | Cerro El Morrión. | 53°34.0′S 72°31.2′W | Fl.W. period 5s fl. 0.4s, ec. 4.6s | 85 26 9 | White fiberglass tower, red band | 13. | Visible 092°-288°. |
| 539 | 2352; G 1460 | Cabo Crosstide. | 53°33.7′S 72°25.4′W | Fl.G. period 5s fl. 0.4s, ec. 4.6s | 92 28 5 | Green fiberglass tower | 11. | Visible 083°-264°. |

== Jerónimo Channel ==
| It. | NGA/Int number | Location | Coordinates | Light characteristic | Height (ft/m) Range (nmi) | Structure description | Height (ft) | Remarks |
|---|---|---|---|---|---|---|---|---|
| 540 | 2353; G 1456.2 | Punta San Carlos. | 53°30.2′S 72°23.9′W | Fl.W. period 5s fl. 0.4s, ec. 4.6s | 33 10 7 | White round tower, red band | 11. | Visible 298°-144°. |
| 541 | 2353.2; G 1456.4 | Islotes Terán. | 53°25.1′S 72°29.0′W | Fl.(4)R. period 12s fl. 0.3s, ec. 1.7s fl. 0.3s, ec. 1.7s fl. 0.3s, ec. 1.7s fl. 0.3s, ec. 5.7s | 26 8 3 | White fiberglass tower, red band | 11. | Visible 326°-151°. |
| 542 | 2353.4; G 1456.6 | Punta Cóndor. | 53°21.8′S 72°30.9′W | Fl.W. period 10s fl. 0.5s, ec. 9.5s | 23 7 7 | White fiberglass tower, red band | 13. | Visible 177°-050°. |
| 543 | 2353.6; G 1457 | Isla Corona. | 53°15.2′S 72°20.9′W | Q.(6)+L.Fl.W. period 15s | 26 8 8 S. | CARDINAL YB, tower | 11. | Visible 211°-090°. |
| 544 | 2353.8; G 1456.8 | Isla Pan de Azúcar. | 53°16.2′S 72°20.5′W | Fl.(2+1)R. period 14s fl. 0.3s, ec. 1.7s fl. 0.3s, ec. 3.7s fl. 0.3s, ec. 7.7s | 49 15 4 | Red round tower, green band | 11. | Visible 035°-221°. |

== Otway Sound ==
| It. | NGA/Int number | Location | Coordinates | Light characteristic | Height (ft/m) Range (nmi) | Structure description | Height (ft) | Remarks |
|---|---|---|---|---|---|---|---|---|
| 545 | 2354 | Isla Vivian. | 53°08.0′S 71°49.4′W | Fl.W. period 12s fl. 0.5s, ec. 11.5s | 49 15 9 | White round tower, red band; | 26. | Visible 182°-157°. |
| 546 | 2355.4; G 1456.3 | Ensenada Demarcación. | 53°26.5′S 72°29.1′W | Fl.(3)G. period 9s fl. 0.3s, ec. 1.7s fl. 0.3s, ec. 1.7s fl. 0.3s, ec. 4.7s | 19 6 3 | Green fiberglass pillar; | 11. | Visible 151°-326°. |
| 547 | 2356; G 1456 | Islote Cohorn, Paso Inglés. -RACON | 53°33.0′S 72°20.1′W | Fl.W. period 10s fl. 0.5s, ec. 9.5s O (– – –) period 45s | 40 12 8; 12 | White fiberglass tower, red band | 26. | Visible 317°-127°. AIS (MMSI No 997251202). |
| 548 | 2360; G 1454 | Isla Rupert, Paso Inglés, NE. side. | 53°39.4′S 72°12.5′W | Fl.W. period 5s fl. 0.4s, ec. 4.6s | 82 25 7 | White fiberglass tower, red bands | 26. | Visible 135°-315°. |
| 549 | 2364; G 1450 | Bahía Fortescue. | 53°42.0′S 72°01.0′W | Fl.(3)W. period 9s fl. 0.3s, ec. 1.7s fl. 0.3s, ec. 1.7s fl. 0.3s, ec. 4.7s | 62 19 6 | White fiberglass tower, red band | 13. | Visible 240°-070°. |

== Brecknock Channel ==
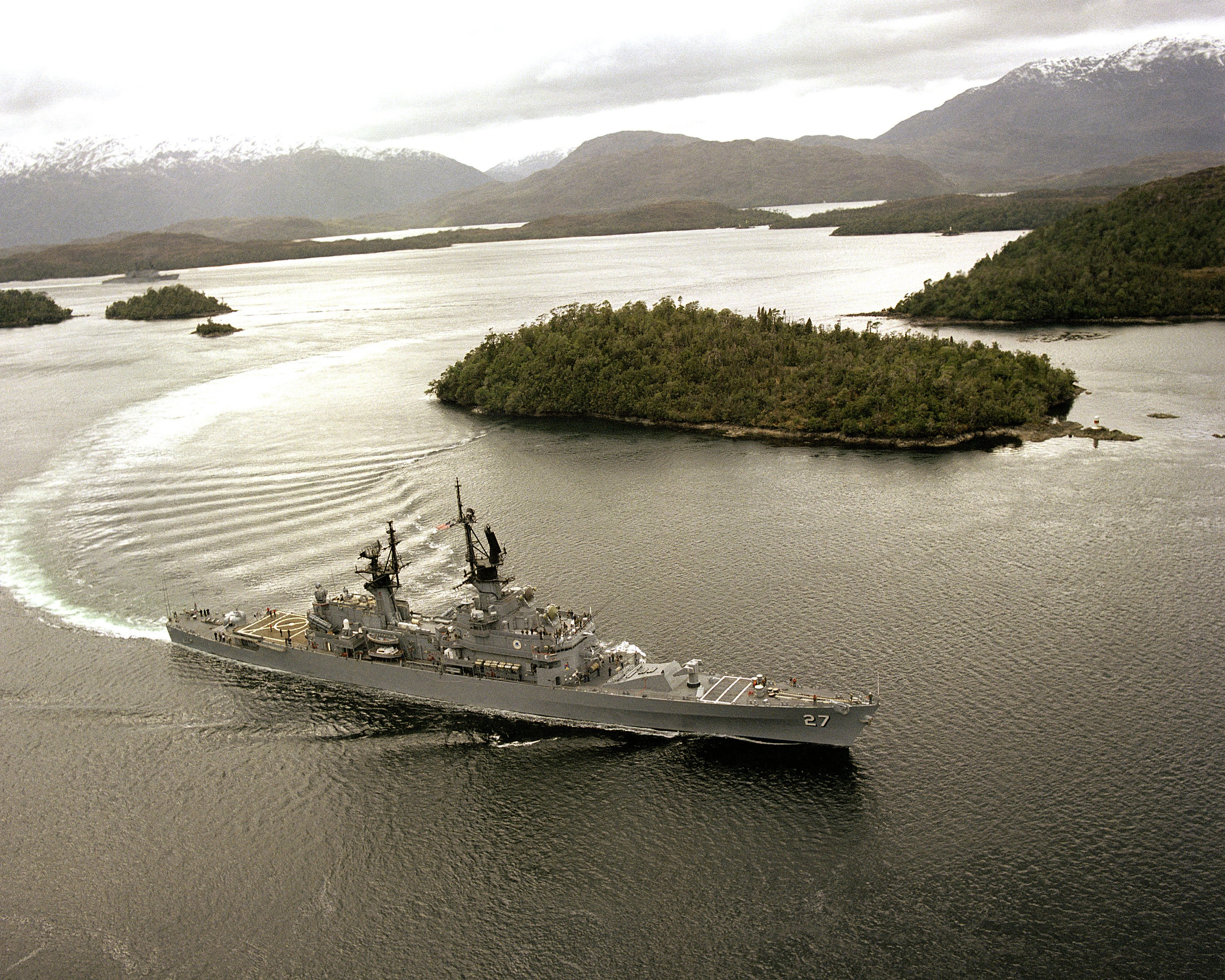
Somewhere in the South, the USS Jospesus Daniels (CG-27) around a Chilean lighthouse

| It. | NGA/Int number | Location | Coordinates | Light characteristic | Height (ft/m) Range (nmi) | Structure description | Height (ft) | Remarks |
|---|---|---|---|---|---|---|---|---|
| 550 | 2365; G 1334.8 | Península Brecknock. | 54°37.5′S 71°45.4′W | Fl.W. period 10s fl. 0.4s, ec. 9.6s | 59 18 8 | White round tower, red horizontal band | 26. | Visible 255°-050°. |
| 551 | 2366; G 1335.2 | Isla London. | 54°38.1′S 71°59.5′W | Fl.W. period 10s fl. 0.5s, ec. 9.5s | 23 7 7 | White round tower, red horizontal band | 11. | Visible 134°-313°. |
| 552 | 2367; G 1335 | Islotes Nelson. | 54°40.5′S 71°53.0′W | Fl.W. period 5s fl. 0.3s, ec. 4.7s | 26 8 7 | White round tower, red horizontal band | 11. | Visible 243°-136°. |
| 553 | 2368; G 1449 | Cabo Holland. | 53°47.8′S 71°41.9′W | Fl.W. period 10s fl. 0.5s, ec. 9.5s | 26 8 7 | White fiberglass post, red bands | 16. | Visible 307°-113°. |
| 554 | 2372; G 1448 | Cabo Froward. | 53°53.7′S 71°18.6′W | Fl.W. period 3s fl. 0.3s, ec. 2.7s | 72 22 7 | White fiberglass tower, red band | 13. | Visible 276°-126°. |
| 555 | 2373; G 1447.33 | Punta Cono. | 54°07.1′S 70°50.5′W | Fl.R. period 5s fl. 1s, ec. 4s | 164 50 6 | White metal pillar, red top | 13. | Visible 000°-162°. |

== Gabriel Channel ==
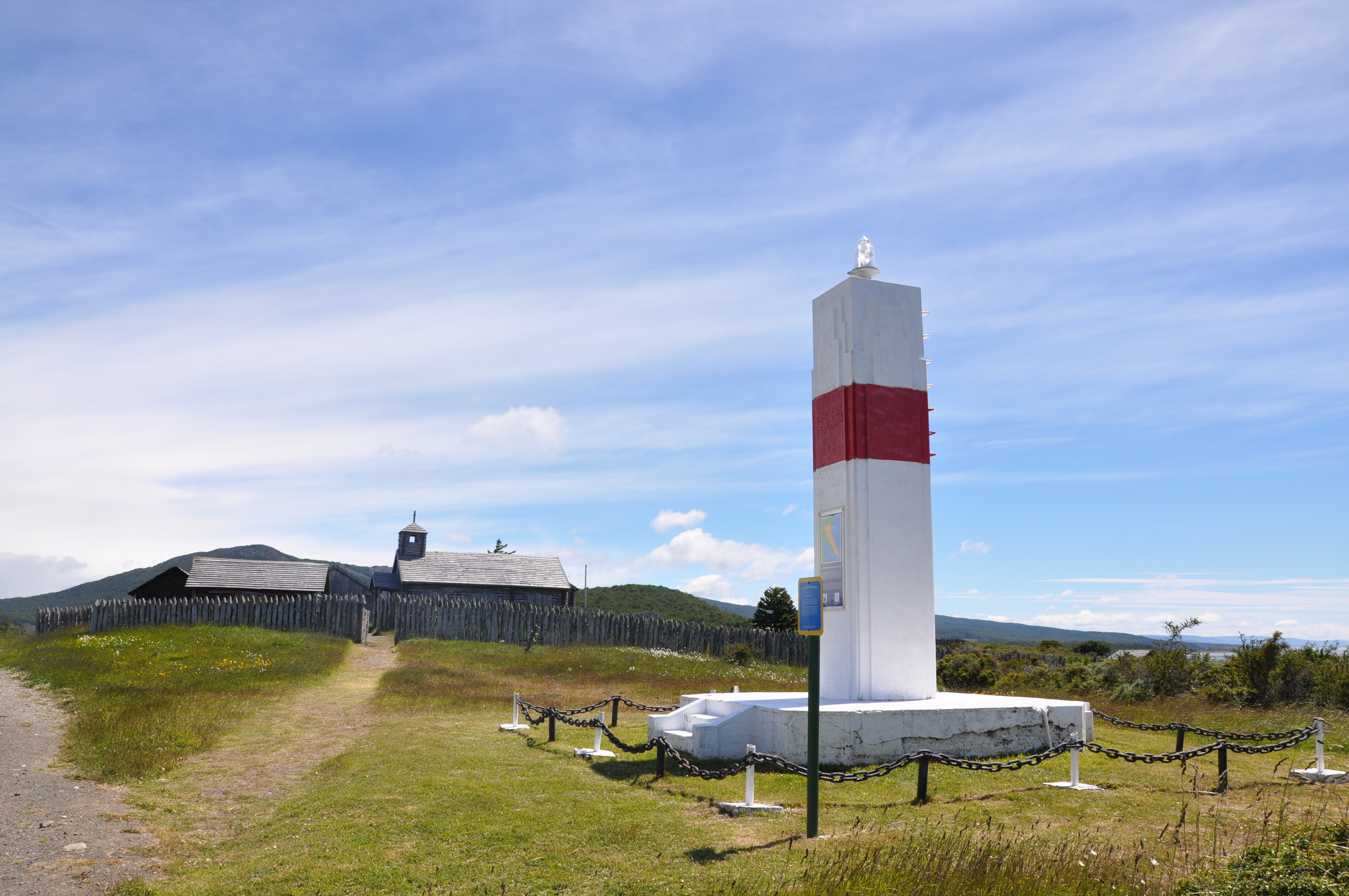
Lighthouse Punta Santa Ana; in the background, Fuerte Bulnes

| It. | NGA/Int number | Location | Coordinates | Light characteristic | Height (ft/m) Range (nmi) | Structure description | Height (ft) | Remarks |
|---|---|---|---|---|---|---|---|---|
| 556 | 2374 | Cabo Expectación. | 54°15.2′S 70°12.6′W | Fl.W. period 10s | 115 35 10 | | | Visible 124°-336°. |
| 557 | 2376; G 1447 | Magdalena Channel, Islotes Anxious. | 54°07.0′S 70°56.0′W | Fl.W. period 10s fl. 0.5s, ec. 9.5s | 33 10 10 | White fiberglass tower, red band | 11. | Visible 346°-194°. |
| 558 | 2380; G 1446 | Cabo San Isidro. | 53°47.0′S 70°59.0′W | Fl.W. period 5s fl. 0.4s, ec. 4.6s | 92 28 9 | White round concrete tower, white dwelling | 26. | Visible 208°-046°. |
| 559 | 2384; G 1444 | Punta Santa Ana, Puerto del Hambre. | 53°38.0′S 70°55.0′W | Fl.W. period 10s fl. 0.5s, ec. 9.5s | 131 40 10 | White quadrangular concrete tower, red band | 16. | Visible 151°-094°. |
| 560 | 2384.1; G 1447.2 | Ite Cenaria. | 54°17.8′S 70°55.9′W | Fl.(2)W. period 10s fl. 0.5s, ec. 2.4s fl. 0.5s, ec. 6.6s | 46 14 4 | Black fiberglass tower, red band | 11. | |
| 561 | 2384.2; G 1447.3 | Punta Pirámide. | 54°26.0′S 71°06.5′W | Fl.(3)W. period 9s fl. 0.3s, ec. 1.7s fl. 0.3s, ec. 1.7s fl. 0.3s, ec. 4.7s | 30 9 6 | White round tower, red horizontal band | 11. | Visible 113°-278°. |
| 562 | 2384.8; G 1447.25 | Punta Pajarito. | 54°21.0′S 70°54.2′W | Fl.W. period 12s fl. 0.5s, ec. 11.5s | 36 11 8 | White fiberglass tower, red band | 26. | Visible 043°-228°. |
| 563 | 2385; G 1447.4 | Isla King. | 54°22.5′S 71°15.5′W | Fl.W. period 5s fl. 0.4s, ec. 4.6s | 23 7 6 | White round tower, red band | 11. | Visible 112°-000°. |
| 564 | 2386; G 1447.5 | Caleta Barrow. | 54°20.3′S 71°26.8′W | Fl.W. period 10s fl. 0.5s, ec. 9.5s | 23 7 7 | White round tower, red horizontal band | 11. | Visible 264°-088°. |
| 565 | 2387; G 1447.6 | Seno Duntze. | 54°20.6′S 71°47.7′W | Fl.(3)W. period 9s fl. 0.3s, ec. 1.7s fl. 0.3s, ec. 1.7s fl. 0.3s, ec. 4.7s | 26 8 6 | White round tower, red horizontal band | 11. | Visible 217°-053°. |
| 566 | 2388; G 1442 | Punta Arska. | 53°34.0′S 70°29.0′W | Fl.(4)W. period 12s fl. 0.5s, ec. 1.5s fl. 0.5s, ec. 1.5s fl. 0.5s, ec. 1.5s fl. 0.5s, ec. 5.5s | 95 29 8 | White fiberglass pillar, red band | 13. | Visible 078°-314°. |
| 567 | 2392; G 1443.2 | Islote Cuervo. | 53°50.3′S 70°25.3′W | Fl.(3)W. period 9s fl. 0.3s, ec. 1.7s fl. 0.3s, ec. 1.7s fl. 0.3s, ec. 4.7s | 20 6 6 | White fiberglass pillar, red band | 13. | |
| 568 | 2396; G 1443.3 | Bahía Harris Mole, head. | 53°50.0′S 70°26.0′W | Fl.R. period 10s fl. 0.5s, ec. 9.5s | 20 6 8 | Red steel post; | 12. | Visible 285°-334°. F.R. at easternmost corner of pier. |

== Whiteside Channel ==
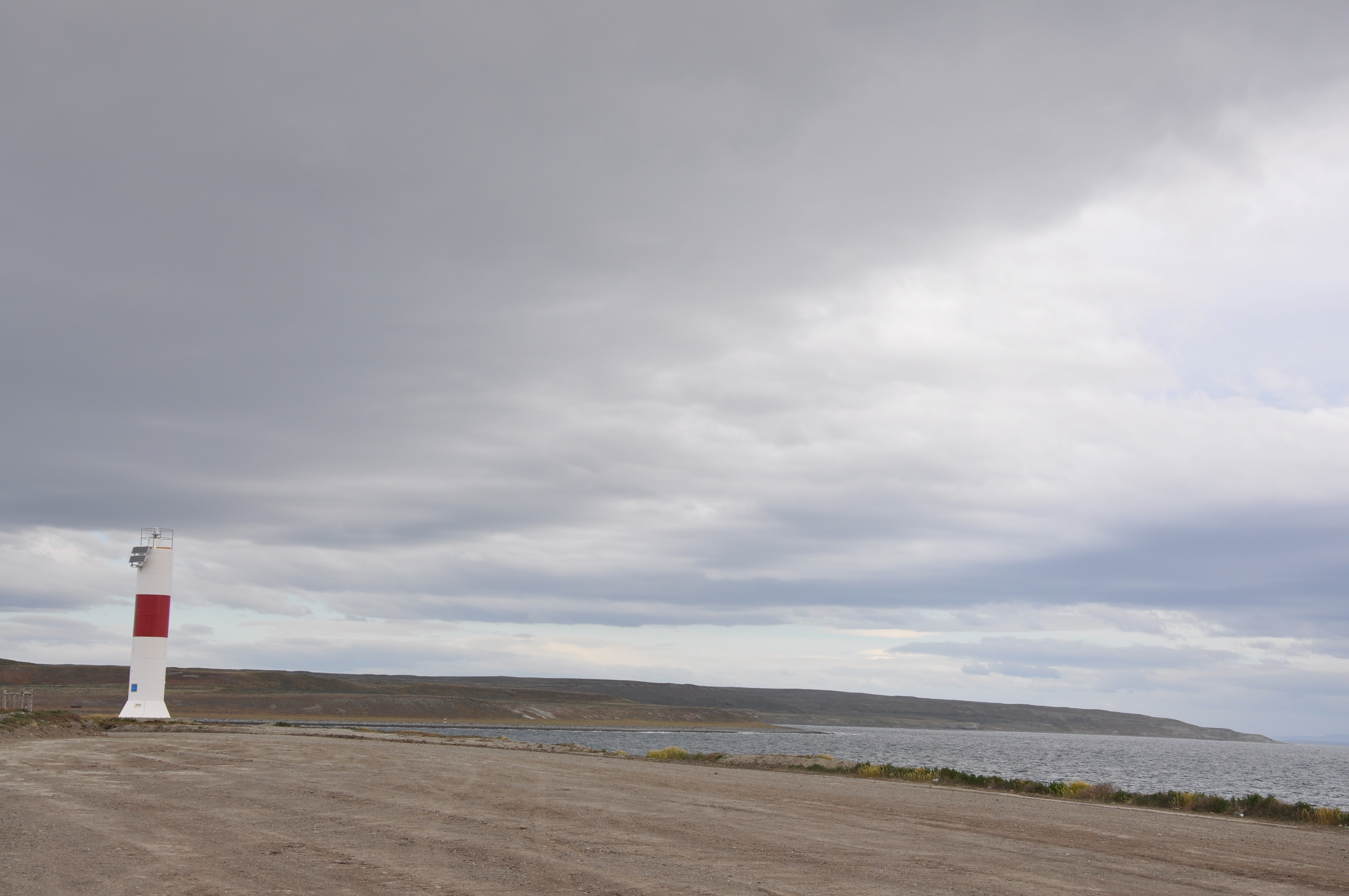
Bahía Porvenir lighthouse

| It. | NGA/Int number | Location | Coordinates | Light characteristic | Height (ft/m) Range (nmi) | Structure description | Height (ft) | Remarks |
|---|---|---|---|---|---|---|---|---|
| 569 | 2400; G 1443 | Islote Tesner. | 53°49.7′S 70°22.8′W | Fl.W. period 3s fl. 1s, ec. 2s | 20 6 8 | White fiberglass tower, red band | 13. | Visible 314°-278°. |
| 570 | 2403; G 1443.5 | Caleta Olguita. | 54°00.0′S 70°04.0′W | Fl.W. period 5s fl. 1s, ec. 4s | 20 6 6 | White fiberglass tower, red band | 11. | Visible 001°-155°. |
| 571 | 2404; G 1440 | Bahía Porvenir. | 53°19.0′S 70°26.0′W | Fl.W. period 12s fl. 0.7s, ec. 11.3s | 69 21 10 | White fiberglass tower, red band | 26. | Visible 276°-131°. |

== Strait of Magellan (71°-68°W) ==
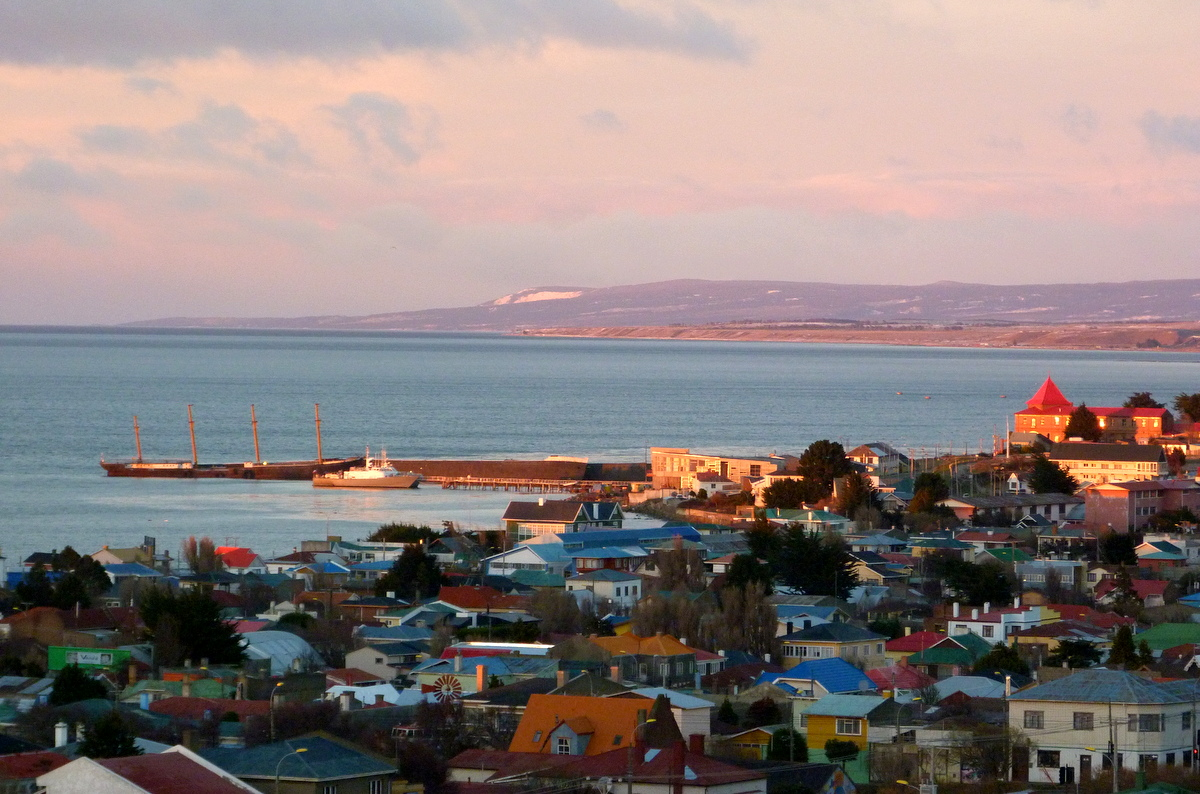
Muñoz Gamero (ex-County of Peebles) and Cavenga in Punta Arenas as breakwater and lighthouse

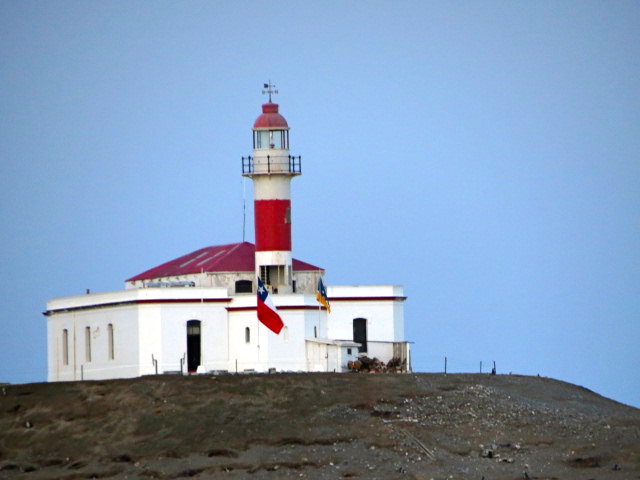
Lighthouse in Magdalena Island, Strait of Magellan

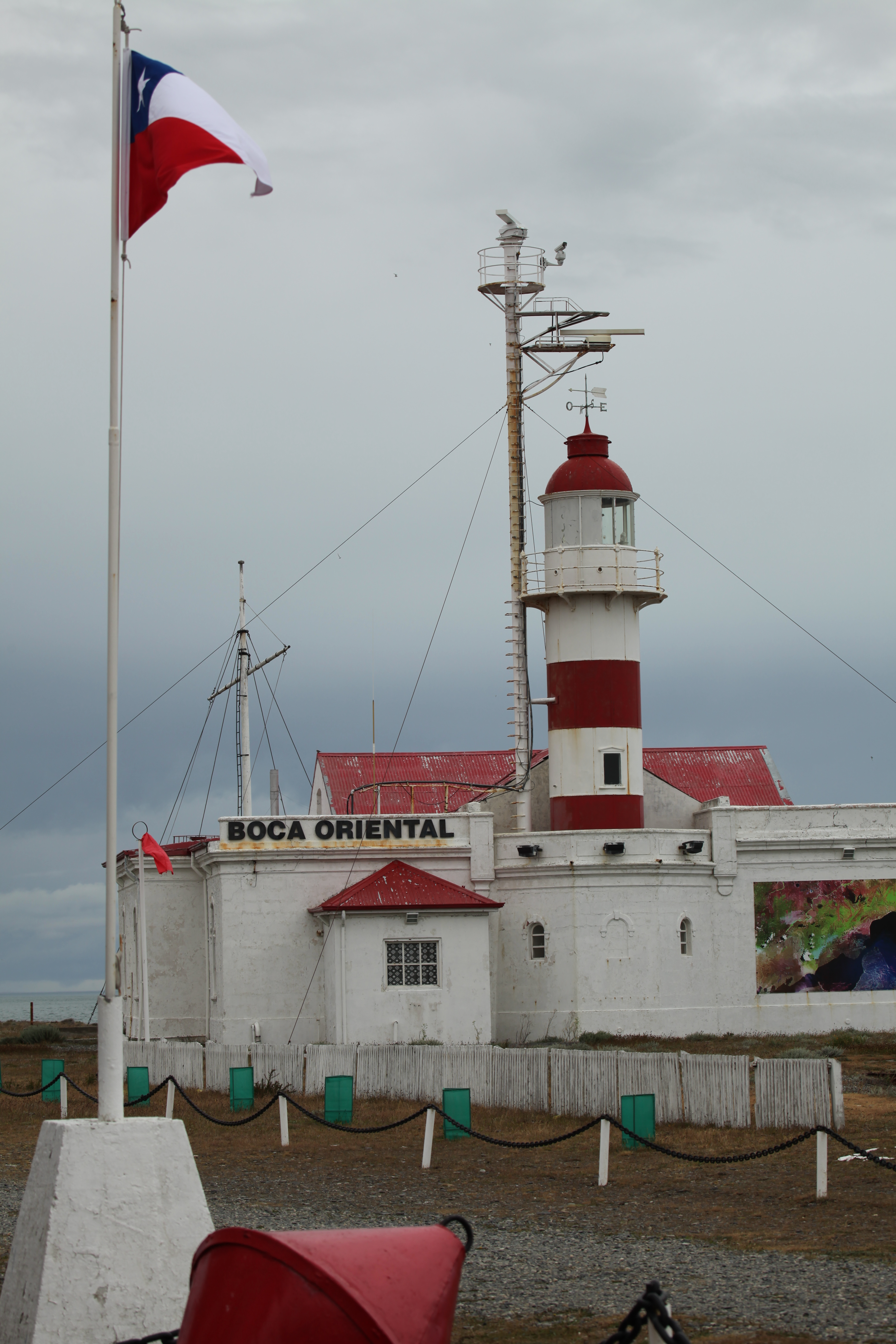
Primera Angostura

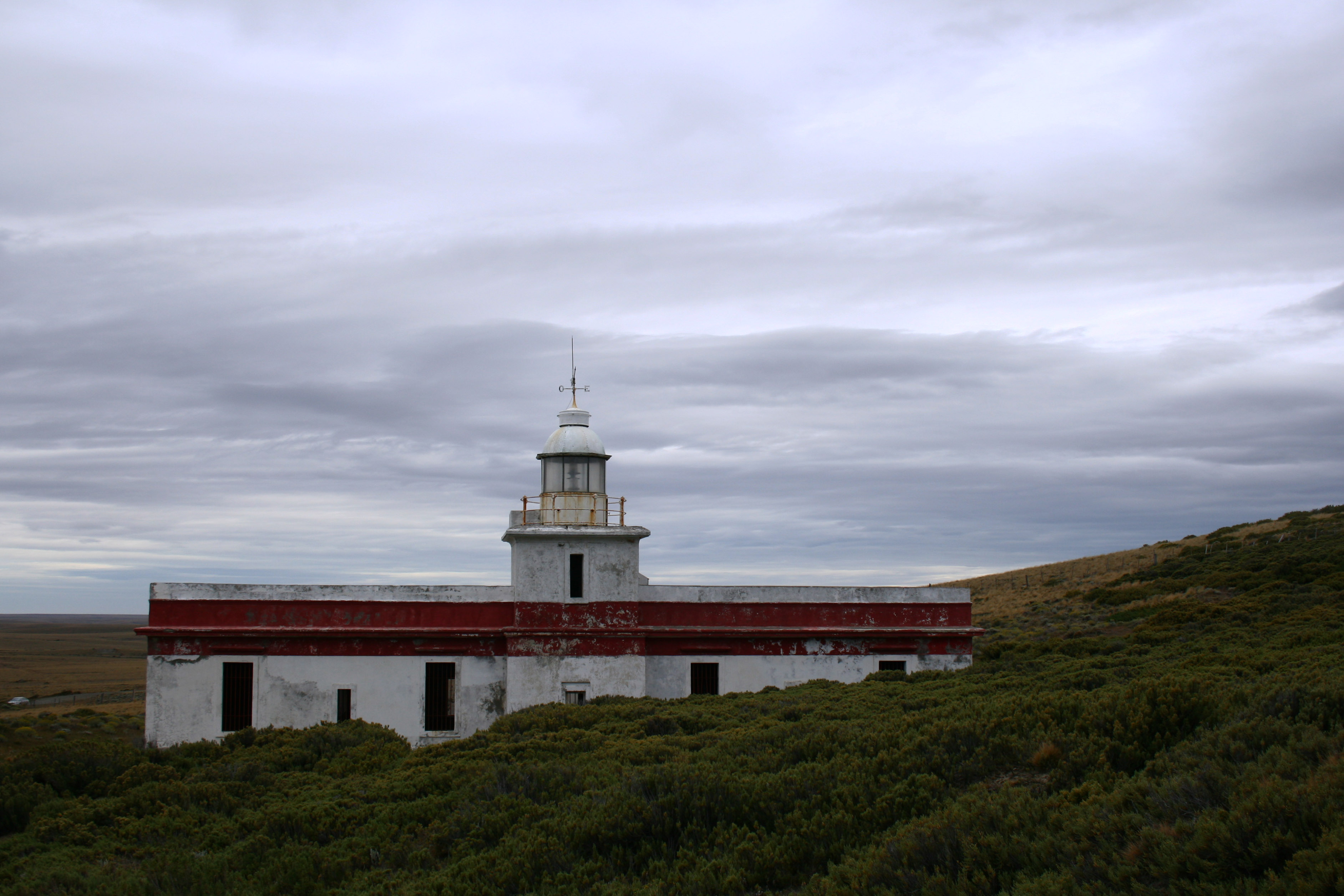
Faro Possession

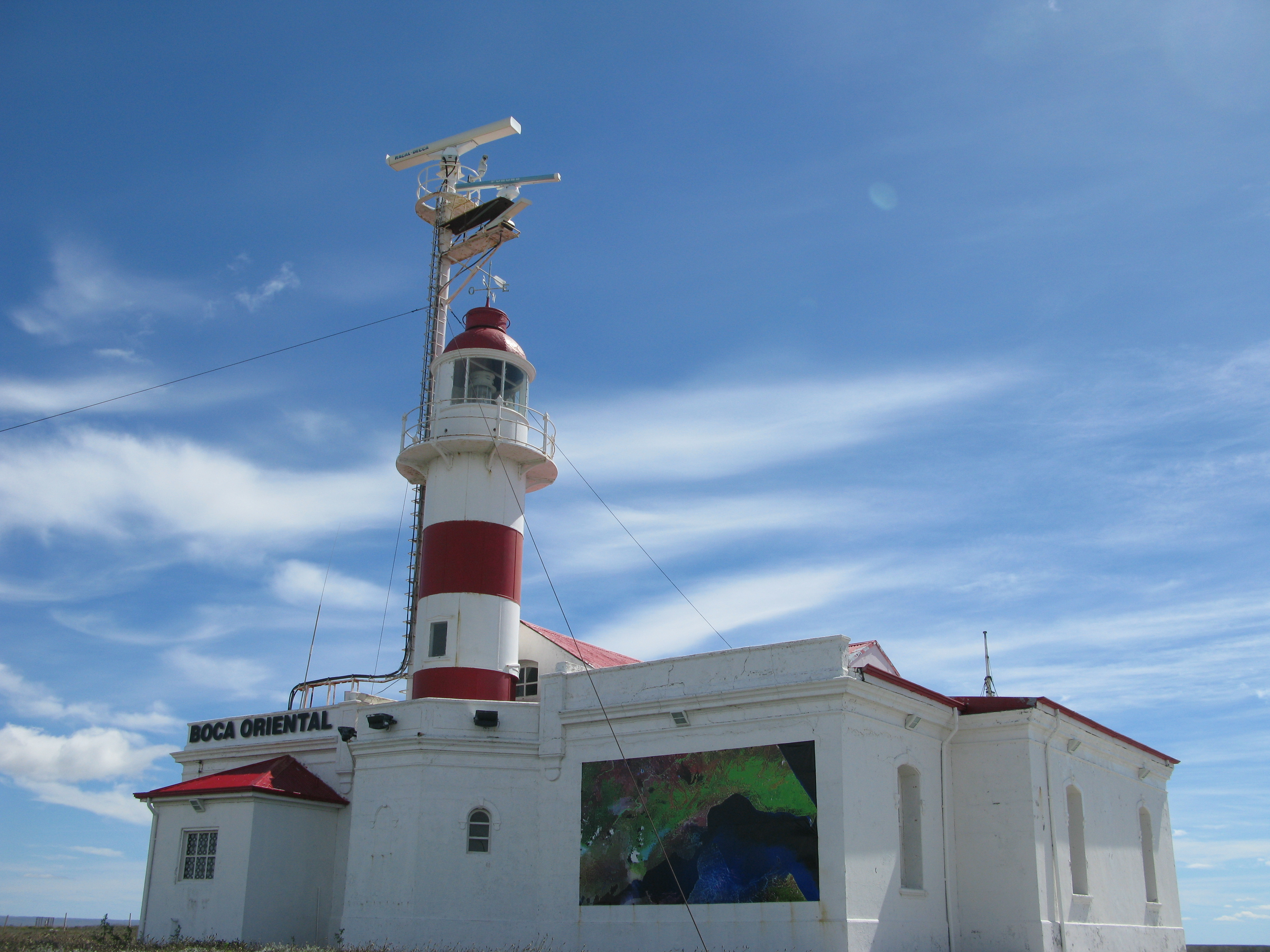
Punta Delgada Lighthouse

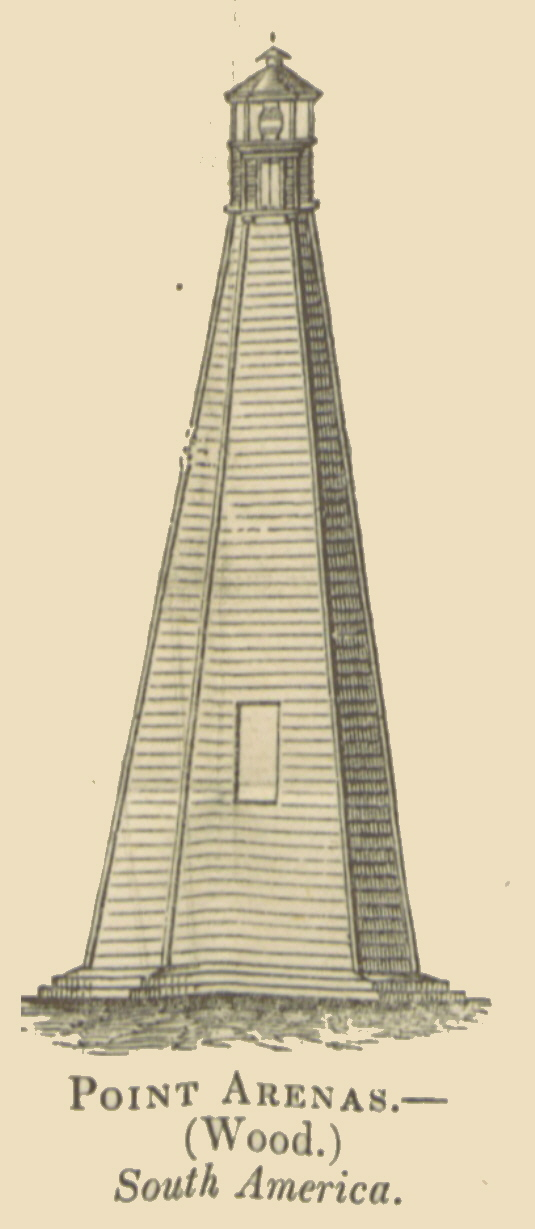
A lighthouse in Punta Arenas, published in Circular relating to Lighthouses, Lightships, Buoys, and Beacons, by Alexander Gordon in 1863

| It. | NGA/Int number | Location | Coordinates | Light characteristic | Height (ft/m) Range (nmi) | Structure description | Height (ft) | Remarks |
|---|---|---|---|---|---|---|---|---|
| 572 | 2405; G 1435.3 | Bahía Catalina, N. | 53°05.8′S 70°52.3′W | Fl.R. period 5s fl. 1s, ec. 4s | 20 6 3 | Red round metal post; | 10. | |
| 573 | 2406; G 1435.31 | S. | 53°05.9′S 70°52.3′W | Fl.G. period 3s fl. 0.3s, ec. 2.7s | 10 3 2 | Green metal post; | 10. | |
| 574 | 2408; G 1435.4 | Muelle Mardones. | 53°07.5′S 70°51.5′W | Fl.G. period 5s fl. 1s, ec. 4s | 26 8 5 | Green round pillar; | 10. | Visible 138°-014°. |
| 575 | 2412; G 1436 | Cabeza Muelle Prat. | 53°10.2′S 70°54.3′W | Fl.W. period 10s fl. 0.5s, ec. 9.5s | 59 18 12 | White metal post, red band; | 49. | F.W. lights shown from cupola of Don Bosco Church. |
| 576 | 2414; G 1438 | Muñoz Gamero Hulk. | 53°10.6′S 70°55.0′W | Fl.W. period 5s fl. 0.4s, ec. 4.6s | 30 9 7 | White metal tower, red band; | 11. | Visible 113°-093°. |
| 577 | 2426; G 1435 | Bahía Catalina. | 53°00.4′S 70°51.8′W | Fl.R. | 27 | | | Aero Radiobeacon. |
| 578 | 2444; G 1426 | Isla Contramaestre. | 52°56.7′S 70°21.6′W | Fl.W. period 10s fl. 0.5s, ec. 9.5s | 82 25 9 | White round concrete tower, red band | 20. | Visible 243°-155°. |
| 579 | 2448; G 1428 | Magdalena Island | 52°55.0′S 70°34.0′W | Fl.W. period 10s fl. 0.5s, ec. 9.5s | 161 49 10 | White round concrete tower, red band | 44. | |
| 580 | 2452; G 1432 | Isla Isabel, on Cabo Tórax. | 52°54.7′S 70°46.9′W | Fl.(3)W. period 9s fl. 0.3s, ec. 1.7s fl. 0.3s, ec. 1.7s fl. 0.3s, ec. 4.7s | 46 14 4 | White fiberglass tower, red bands | 26. | |
| 581 | 2454; G 1431 | Isla Isabel Range, front. | 52°54.6′S 70°44.1′W | Fl.W. period 5s fl. 0.4s, ec. 4.6s | 29 9 7 | White fiberglass tower, red band | 13. | Visible 242° 30' -082°. |
| 582 | 2455; G 1431.1 | Rear, 190 meters 007° from front. | 52°54.5′S 70°44.1′W | Fl.W. period 5s fl. 0.4s, ec. 4.6s | 43 13 10 | White fiberglass tower, red band | 30. | Visible 353° 30' -022° 30'. |
| 583 | 2464; G 1425.5 | Cabo San Vicente. | 52°46.6′S 70°25.9′W | Fl.W. period 5s fl. 0.4s, ec. 4.6s | 210 64 10 | White fiberglass tower, red band | 13. | Visible 303°-233°. |
| 584 | 2468; G 1424 | Cerro Cono. | 52°39.8′S 70°23.5′W | Fl.(3)W. period 9s fl. 0.3s, ec. 1.7s fl. 0.3s, ec. 1.7s fl. 0.3s, ec. 4.7s | 161 49 7 | White fiberglass tower, red band | 13. | Visible 262°-064°. |
| 585 | 2472; G 1425 | Segunda Angostura. -RACON | 52°44.1′S 70°10.7′W | Fl.W. period 10s fl. 0.7s, ec. 9.3s M(– –) period 48s | 66 20 9; 15 | White octagonal concrete tower, red band | 20. | Visible 086°-278°. |
| 586 | 2476; G 1422 | Puerto Sara Range, front. | 52°37.4′S 70°11.9′W | 2 F.Y. | 49 15 3 | White iron post, white triangular daymark, orange and red band | 36. | Private light. |
| 587 | 2476.5; G 1422.1 | Rear, 185 meters 334° from front. | 52°37.2′S 70°12.0′W | 2 F.Y. | 75 23 3 | White metal tower, red band; | 16. | Private light. |
| 588 | 2478; G 1421.7 | Punta Valle. | 52°33.1′S 70°00.9′W | Fl.(3+1)Y. period 20s fl. 0.5s, ec. 1.5s fl. 0.5s, ec. 1.5s fl. 0.5s, ec. 4.5s fl. 0.5s, ec. 10.5s | 59 18 8 | Yellow metal framework tower | 16. | Visible 273°-030°. |
| 589 | 2481; G 1421 | Punta Piedra. | 52°47.2′S 69°50.2′W | Fl.(3+1)Y. period 20s fl. 0.5s, ec. 1.5s fl. 0.5s, ec. 1.5s fl. 0.5s, ec. 4.5s fl. 0.5s, ec. 10.5s | 33 10 8 | Yellow pyramidal metal framework tower | 16. | Visible 108°-227°. |
| 590 | 2484; G 1420 | Crawford. | 52°32.7′S 69°36.2′W | Fl.W. period 5s fl. 0.4s, ec. 4.6s | 49 15 17 | White fiberglass tower, red bands | 26. | Visible 022°-191°. Radar reflector. |
| 591 | 2488; G 1419 | Bajo Satélite. -RACON | 52°33.4′S 69°41.5′W | Fl.W. period 5s fl. 0.4s, ec. 4.6s T(–) period 60s | 33 10 9; 10 | Triangular red iron skeleton tower | 33. | Radar reflector. |
| 592 | 2492; G 1416 | Punta Méndez. | 52°31.7′S 69°35.0′W | Fl.(3)W. period 9s fl. 0.3s, ec. 1.7s fl. 0.3s, ec. 1.7s fl. 0.3s, ec. 4.7s | 105 32 6 | White fiberglass tower, red band | 13. | Visible 040°-226°. |
| 593 | 2496; G 1414 | Punta Delgada | 52°27.4′S 69°32.8′W | Fl.W. period 5s fl. 0.3s, ec. 4.7s | 69 21 19 | White metal tower, red bands | 38. | Visible 229°-039°. Signal station. |
| 594 | 2508; G 1413 | Banco Dirección. | 52°25.6′S 69°30.0′W | Fl.(2)R. period 6s fl. 0.3s, ec. 1.7s fl. 0.3s, ec. 3.7s | 26 8 4 | Red pyramidal metal tower | 26. | Radar reflector. |
| 595 | 2512; G 1411.5 | Puerto Progreso. | 52°28.7′S 69°30.0′W | Fl.(2)G. period 6s fl. 0.3s, ec. 1.7s fl. 0.3s, ec. 3.7s | 26 8 5 | Green pyramidal metal tower | 26. | Radar reflector. |
| 596 | 2516; G 1412 | Cerro Dirección. -RACON | 52°21.2′S 69°30.1′W | Fl.W. period 10s fl. 0.7s, ec. 9.3s O(– – –) period 60s | 272 83 11; 15 | White fiberglass tower, red band | 36. | Visible 193°-015° and 022°- 025°. |
| 597 | 2520; G 1411 | Punta Anegada. | 52°27.5′S 69°25.9′W | Fl.G. period 10s fl. 0.5s, ec. 9.5s | 26 8 5 | White fiberglass tower, red band | 11. | Visible 058°-287°. |
| 598 | 2524; G 1410.5 | Banco Orange. | 52°24.8′S 69°21.4′W | Fl.G. period 5s fl. 0.4s, ec. 4.6s | 20 6 5 | Green pyramidal metal tower | 20. | Radar reflector. |
| 599 | 2525; G 1407 | PE-1. -RACON | 52°20.8′S 69°05.2′W | 2 Mo.(U)W. period 20s T(–) period 48s | 62 19 10; 14 | Platform. | | Horn: Mo.(U) 30s. |
| 600 | 2526; G 1407.06 | PE-2. | 52°22.0′S 69°04.9′W | 2 Mo.(U)W. period 20s | 59 18 10 | | | Platform. |
| 601 | 2527; G 1406.5 | PO-2. | 52°19.0′S 69°03.9′W | Fl.R. period 5s fl. 0.5s, ec. 4.5s 4 Mo.(U)W. period 20s | 59 18 6; 52 16 10 | | | Platform. Horn: Mo.(U) 30s. |
| 602 | 2527.5; G 1406 | SPN-2. | 52°24.1′S 69°04.7′W | Fl.G. period 5s 2 Mo.(U)W. period 20s | 72 22 10; 72 22 7 | Platform. | | 2 Mo.(U)W. 20s 18m 10M, Horn: Mo.(U) 30s on platform SPN-3 close by. Platform SPN-1 0.9 mile S. Platform SPN-4 2.4 miles SSE. |
| 603 | 2528; G 1409 | Banco Narrow. | 52°18.9′S 69°19.3′W | Fl.R. period 5s fl. 1s, ec. 4s | 33 10 6 | Triangular red skeleton tower | 33. | Radar reflector. |
| 604 | 2532; G 1408 | Cabo Posesión, SW. of summit. | 52°17.5′S 68°57.8′W | Fl.W. period 18s fl. 0.5s, ec. 17.5s | 295 90 10 | White square tower, red band, house | 36. | Visible 295°-104° and 115°-134°. |

== Bahía Desolada ==
| It. | NGA/Int number | Location | Coordinates | Light characteristic | Height (ft/m) Range (nmi) | Structure description | Height (ft) | Remarks |
|---|---|---|---|---|---|---|---|---|
| 605 | 2536; G 1334.6 | Cabo Atracadero. | 54°41.6′S 71°32.2′W | Fl.G. period 5s fl. 1s, ec. 4s | 52 16 4 | White fiberglass tower, green upper part | 11. | Visible 258°-091°. |
| 606 | 2537; G 1335.1 | Isla Sidney, Punta Carmela. | 54°45.2′S 71°46.1′W | Fl.W. period 12s fl. 0.3s, ec. 11.7s | 36 11 9 | White fiberglass tower, red band | 13. | Visible 132°-305°. |
| 607 | 2537.5; G 1334.06 | Paso Occidental, Islote Peñón. RACON | 54°47.8′S 71°31.3′W | Fl.W. period 10s fl. 0.3s, ec. 9.7s O(– – –) | 262 80 9; 15 | White fiberglass tower, red band | 13. | Visible 090°-290°. |
| 608 | 2538; G 1334.1 | Paso Occidental Islote Laberinto. | 54°45.0′S 71°25.7′W | Fl.R. period 10s fl. 0.5s, ec. 9.5s | 23 7 6 | Red fiberglass tower, red conical topmark | 13. | Visible 036°-251°. |
| 609 | 2539; G 1334.15 | Eastern Laberinto Inlet. | 54°44.0′S 71°28.0′W | Fl.G. period 10s fl. 0.3s, ec. 9.7s | 16 5 6 | Green fiberglass tower | 11. | |

== Ballenero Channel ==
| It. | NGA/Int number | Location | Coordinates | Light characteristic | Height (ft/m) Range (nmi) | Structure description | Height (ft) | Remarks |
|---|---|---|---|---|---|---|---|---|
| 610 | 2540; G 1334.4 | Islote Entrada. | 54°41.7′S 71°26.8′W | Fl.W. period 5s fl. 0.4s, ec. 4.6s | 66 20 7 | White tower, red band; | 13. | Visible 045°-290°. |
| 611 | 2544; G 1334.2 | Islote Dirección. | 54°42.9′S 71°21.1′W | Fl.(2)W. period 10s fl. 0.5s, ec. 2.4s fl. 0.5s, ec. 6.6s | 56 17 5 | ISOLATED DANGER BRB, beacon | 10. | |
| 612 | 2548; G 1334 | Isla Burnt. | 54°44.0′S 71°16.3′W | Fl.W. period 10s fl. 0.5s, ec. 9.5s | 52 16 8 | White round tower, red horizontal band | 26. | Visible 285°-130°. |
| 613 | 2552; G 1333.8 | Isla Señal, Canal Ballenero. | 54°50.5′S 70°55.9′W | Fl.W. period 5s fl. 1s, ec. 4s | 33 10 8 | White round tower, red band; | 13. | Visible 295°-135°. |
| 614 | 2554; G 1333.5 | Acevedo. | 54°54.0′S 70°22.6′W | Fl.W. period 5s fl. 1s, ec. 4s | 79 24 8 | White fiberglass tower, red band | 13. | Visible 065°-332°. |
| 615 | 2556; G 1333.6 | Isla Redonda, Canal Ballenero. | 54°55.1′S 70°38.1′W | Fl.W. period 10s fl. 0.5s, ec. 9.5s | 52 16 7 | White round fiberglass tower, red band | 10. | Visible 257°-112°. |
| 616 | 2557; G 1333.7 | Islote Arancibia Clavel. | 54°52.2′S 70°22.8′W | Fl.W. period 10s fl. 1s, ec. 9s | 20 6 9 | White fiberglass tower, red band | 13. | Visible 112°-308°. |
| 617 | 2557.5; G 1333.4 | Islote Cóndor. | 54°53.0′S 70°20.0′W | Fl.(2+1)G. period 14s fl. 0.3s, ec. 1.7s fl. 0.3s, ec. 3.7s fl. 0.3s, ec. 7.7s | 85 26 5 | Green fiberglass tower, red bands | 11. | Visible 294°-114°. |
| 618 | 2558; G 1333.2 | Islote Término. | 54°53.2′S 70°17.6′W | Fl.G. period 5s fl. 0.4s, ec. 4.6s | 39 12 4 | Green fiberglass tower; | 10. | Visible 108°-074°. |
| 619 | 2560; G 1333 | Islote Montenares. | 54°51.5′S 70°05.7′W | Fl.W. period 5s fl. 0.4s, ec. 4.6s | 43 13 7 | White fiberglass tower, red band | 11. | |

== Thomson Channel ==
| It. | NGA/Int number | Location | Coordinates | Light characteristic | Height (ft/m) Range (nmi) | Structure description | Height (ft) | Remarks |
|---|---|---|---|---|---|---|---|---|
| 620 | 2561; G 1333.1 | Isla Maruja. | 54°55.0′S 70°13.5′W | Fl.W. period 5s fl. 1s, ec. 4s | 39 12 8 | White fiberglass tower, red band | 13. | Visible 155°- 013°. |
| 621 | 2562.5; G 1333.17 | Islote Pollera. | 55°03.0′S 70°12.3′W | Fl.R. period 5s fl. 1s, ec. 4s | 82 25 6 | STARBOARD (B) R, fiberglass tower, topmark | 11. | |
| 622 | 2563; G 1333.19 | Islote Salientes. | 55°06.8′S 70°14.4′W | Fl.W. period 5s fl. 1s, ec. 4s | 39 12 9 | White fiberglass tower, red band | 11. | Visible 177°-007° and 019°- 051°. |

== Cook Bay ==
| It. | NGA/Int number | Location | Coordinates | Light characteristic | Height (ft/m) Range (nmi) | Structure description | Height (ft) | Remarks |
|---|---|---|---|---|---|---|---|---|
| 623 | 2563.2; G 1333.195 | Sandwich Islets -RACON | 55°11.2′S 70°24.1′W | Fl.W. period 10s fl. 1s, ec. 9s O (– – –) | 210 64 9 | White fiberglass tower, red band | 13. | Visible 239°-057°. AIS (MMSI No 997251006). |

== Beagle Channel ==
| It. | NGA/Int number | Location | Coordinates | Light characteristic | Height (ft/m) Range (nmi) | Structure description | Height (ft) | Remarks |
|---|---|---|---|---|---|---|---|---|
| 624 | 2563.5; G 1332.5 | Ventisquero Romanche. (A.) | 54°52.3′S 69°29.0′W | Fl.W. period 12s fl. 0.5s, ec. 11.5s | 20 6 8 | White fiberglass tower, red band | 13. | Visible 286°-105°. |
| 625 | 2564; G 1332 | Punta Yámana. | 54°57.9′S 69°01.7′W | Fl.W. period 12s fl. 0.5s, ec. 11.5s | 42 13 7 | White concrete tower, red band | 16. | Visible 265°-095°. |
| 626 | 2566; G 1332.2 | Ventisquero Holanda Glacier. | 54°56.9′S 69°07.5′W | Fl.W. period 10s fl. 0.7s, ec. 9.3s | 36 11 7 | White round fiberglass tower, red band | 11. | Visible 010°-106° and 300°- 320°. |
| 627 | 2567; G 1332.3 | Isla Gordon, Punta Divide. | 54°58.0′S 69°07.9′W | Fl.W. period 5s fl. 0.4s, ec. 4.6s | 30 9 7 | White fiberglass tower, red band | 11. | Visible 140°-017°. |
| 628 | 2567.5; G 1331 | Cabo Hann. | 54°57.1′S 68°24.1′W | Fl.W. period 5s fl. 1s, ec. 4s | 11 4 6 | White metal pile, red band | 8. | Visible 142°-327°. |
| 629 | 2567.6; G 1331.2 | Punta Oriental. | 54°59.0′S 68°21.2′W | Fl.R. period 5s fl. 1s, ec. 4s | 82 25 4 | Red fiberglass tower, red triangular daymark | 11. | Visible 333°-129°. |
| 630 | 2568; G 1330 | Rocas Contramaestre Perón. | 54°55.3′S 68°34.7′W | Q.W. | 72 22 7 | N. CARDINAL BY, tower | 26. | |
| 631 | 2570; G 1329.5 | Zeballos. | 54°53.5′S 68°36.4′W | Fl.W. period 4s fl. 0.5s, ec. 3.5s | 39 12 7 | White conical fiberglass tower, red bands | 26. | |
| 632 | 2572; G 1329 | Lapataia. (A.) | 54°51.7′S 68°33.8′W | Fl.W. period 10s fl. 0.5s, ec. 9.5s | 30 9 6 | Black column, black and white cross | 13. | |
| 633 | 2576; G 1323 | Paso Chico Range, front. (A.) | 54°50.4′S 68°15.6′W | Fl.W. period 6s fl. 1s, ec. 5s | 33 10 8 | White metal framework tower, red band | 26. | |
| 634 | 2578; G 1323.1 | Rear, 465 meters 019° 22' from front, Isla Casco. (A.) | 54°50.1′S 68°15.7′W | Fl.R. period 3s fl. 0.5s, ec. 2.5s | 49 15 6 | White metal framework tower, black bands | 39. | |

== Ushuaia Bay (A.) ==
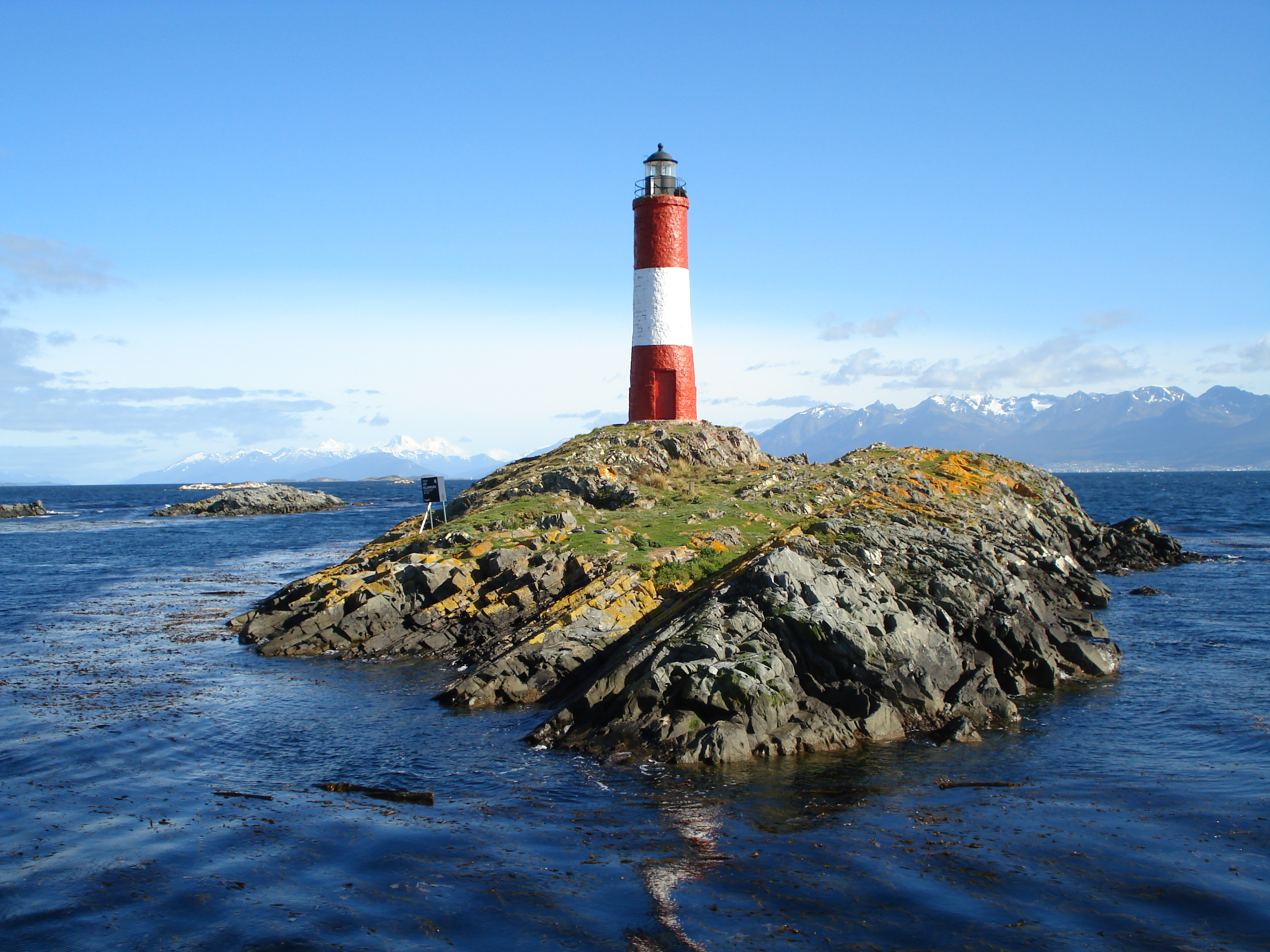
Argentine Les Eclaireurs Lighthouse, in the Beagle Channel

| It. | NGA/Int number | Location | Coordinates | Light characteristic | Height (ft/m) Range (nmi) | Structure description | Height (ft) | Remarks |
|---|---|---|---|---|---|---|---|---|
| 635 | 2580; G 1325 | Punta Observatorio. (A.) | 54°49.0′S 68°18.0′W | Fl.W. period 2s fl. 0.2s, ec. 1.8s | 33 10 7 | Red truncated pyramidal tower, white bands | 26. | |
| 636 | 2584; G 1326 | Muelle Gobernación, extension, head. (A.) | 54°48.7′S 68°18.0′W | Fl.R. period 3s fl. 0.5s, ec. 2.5s | 28 9 5 | Black truncated pyramidal tower, yellow rectangular daymark, black band | 20. | |
| 637 | 2590; G 1326.5 | Muelle Laserre. (A.) | 54°48.4′S 68°17.7′W | Iso.Y.Bu. period 6s | 13 4 2 | Orange tower, yellow band | 16. | |
| 638 | 2596; G 1327 | Guardiamarina Moutin. (A.) | 54°48.2′S 68°17.5′W | Al.Iso.Y.Bu. period 4s | 13 4 1 | Yellow tower, orange band; | 13. | |
| 639 | 2600; G 1323.4 | Islas Bridges, W. end. (A.) | 54°52.2′S 68°16.0′W | Fl.W. period 5s fl. 0.5s, ec. 4.5s | 48 15 5 | Red prismatic tower, white band | 30. | |
| 640 | 2604; G 1322.4 | Iturrieta. (A.) | 54°52.7′S 68°14.6′W | Q.(6)+L.Fl.W. period 15s | 102 31 4 | S. CARDINAL YB, tower; | 33. | |
| 641 | 2608; G 1322 | Islote Bartlett. | 54°53.6′S 68°13.6′W | Q.W. | 52 16 5 | N. CARDINAL BY, tower; | 13. | |
| 642 | 2609; G 1322.1 | Isla Martínez, Rocas Centinela. | 54°54.7′S 68°18.1′W | Fl.G. period 5s fl. 0.5s, ec. 4.5s | 20 6 2 | White metal pillar, green top; | 12. | Visible 336°-241°. |
| 643 | 2616; G 1323.6 | Escarpados. (A.) | 54°49.1′S 68°11.2′W | Fl.W. period 10s fl. 0.5s, ec. 9.5s | 194 59 6 | Black truncated pyramidal tower, yellow bands, white double cone topmark | 33. | |
| 644 | 2620; G 1320 | Islotes Les Eclaireurs. (A.) | 54°52.3′S 68°05.0′W | Fl.W.R. period 5s fl. 0.5s, ec. 4.5s | 74 23 W. 10 R. 7 | Red truncated conical stone tower, white bands | 36. | R. 081°-115°, W. elsewhere. |
| 645 | 2624; G 1319.4 | Punta San Juan. (A.) | 54°51.3′S 67°59.4′W | Fl.W. period 8s fl. 1s, ec. 7s | 79 24 6 | White truncated pyramidal tower, red band | 26. | |
| 646 | 2632; G 1318 | Rocas Lawrence. (A.) | 54°52.5′S 67°52.6′W | V.Q.(6)+L.Fl.W. period 10s | 30 9 8 | S. CARDINAL YB, tower; | 30. | Radar reflector. |
| 647 | 2636; G 1317.8 | Punta Paraná. (A.) | 54°52.8′S 67°45.7′W | Fl.W. period 5s fl. 0.5s, ec. 4.5s | 75 23 6 | White truncated pyramidal tower, red bands | 20. | |
| 648 | 2638; G 1314.3 | Banco Herradura. | 54°54.0′S 67°36.2′W | Q.W. | 20 6 5 | N. CARDINAL BY, beacon, topmark. | | |
| 649 | 2640; G 1316 | Punta Gusano, end of peninsula. | 54°55.1′S 67°36.7′W | Fl.(3)R. period 9s fl. 0.5s, ec. 1.5s fl. 0.5s, ec. 1.5s fl. 0.5s, ec. 4.5s | 30 9 5 | Red fiberglass pillar, triangular daymark | 10. | |
| 650 | 2664; G 1315 | Dirección. (A.) | 54°52.7′S 67°35.9′W | Fl.(2)W. period 16s fl. 1s, ec. 3s fl. 1s, ec. 11s | 75 23 6 | Red truncated conical fiberglass tower, yellow band | 24. | |

== Gable Island (A.) ==
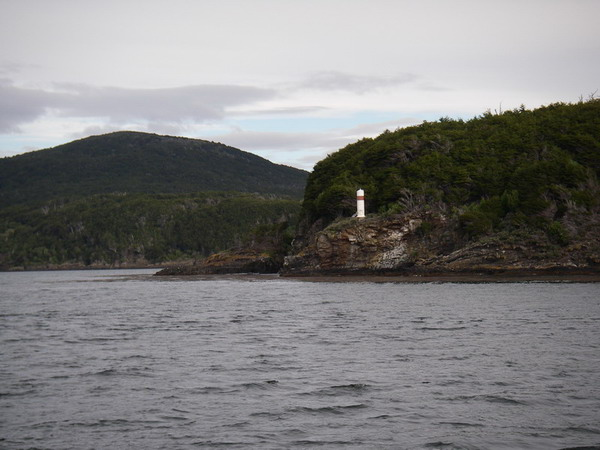
Lighthouse in Allen Gardiner Island, north of Picton Island

| It. | NGA/Int number | Location | Coordinates | Light characteristic | Height (ft/m) Range (nmi) | Structure description | Height (ft) | Remarks |
|---|---|---|---|---|---|---|---|---|
| 651 | 2668; G 1314 | W. end of island range, front. (A.) | 54°53.6′S 67°32.1′W | Fl.W. period 5s fl. 0.5s, ec. 4.5s | 161 49 6 | White truncated pyramidal tower, orange bands | 20. | Visible 000°-250°. |
| 652 | 2672; G 1314.1 | Rear, 353 meters 090° from front. (A.) | 54°53.6′S 67°31.8′W | Fl.W. period 4s fl. 0.8s, ec. 3.2s | 236 72 6 | Orange truncated pyramidal tower | 26. | Visible 000°-250°. |
| 653 | 2676; G 1313 | Punta Trucco Range, front. | 54°55.5′S 67°31.7′W | Fl.W. period 5s fl. 0.4s, ec. 4.6s | 32 10 8 | White fiberglass tower, red band | 26. | Visible 075°-180°. |
| 654 | 2680; G 1313.1 | Rear, about 200 meters 140° from front. | 54°55.5′S 67°31.7′W | Fl.W. period 5s | 73 22 14 | White fiberglass tower, black band | 26. | Visible 130°-150°. |
| 655 | 2684; G 1311 | Punta Espora. (A.) | 54°55.1′S 67°29.4′W | Fl.W. period 4s fl. 0.5s, ec. 3.5s | 52 16 8 | White truncated conical tower, red bands | 28. | |
| 656 | 2688; G 1312 | Rosales Point Range, front. | 54°55.5′S 67°27.5′W | Fl.(3)W. period 9s fl. 0.3s, ec. 1.7s fl. 0.3s, ec. 1.7s fl. 0.3s, ec. 4.7s | 23 7 6 | White fiberglass tower, red band | 13. | Visible 075°-180°. |
| 657 | 2692; G 1312.1 | Rear, about 720 meters 100° from front. | 54°55.6′S 67°26.8′W | Fl.(3)W. period 9s fl. 0.3s, ec. 1.7s fl. 0.3s, ec. 1.7s fl. 0.3s, ec. 4.7s | 52 16 7 | White fiberglass tower, red band | 13. | |
| 658 | 2696; G 1310 | Punta Mackinlay, on Gable Island. (A.) | 54°54.7′S 67°24.9′W | Fl.R. period 2s fl. 0.5s, ec. 1.5s | 31 9 6 | Red and white checkered round concrete tower | 23. | Radar reflector. |
| 659 | 2700; G 1308 | Isla Martillo. (A.) | 54°54.6′S 67°22.5′W | Fl.W. period 7s fl. 1s, ec. 6s | 25 8 7 | White truncated pyramidal tower, red bands | 25. | |
| 660 | 2704; G 1307 | Isla Barlovento. | 54°55.3′S 67°18.5′W | Fl.W. period 5s fl. 0.4s, ec. 4.6s | 37 11 5 | White fiberglass tower, red bands | 26. | |
| 661 | 2708; G 1306 | Ponsati. (A.) | 54°53.2′S 67°17.7′W | Fl.(2)W. period 16s fl. 1s, ec. 4s fl. 1s, ec. 10s | 33 10 6 | White truncated pyramidal tower, black bands | 23. | |
| 662 | 2710; G 1303.4 | Isla Snipe. (See Snipe incident) | 54°57.1′S 67°09.3′W | Fl.(4)W. period 12s fl. 0.5s, ec. 1.5s fl. 0.5s, ec. 1.5s fl. 0.5s, ec. 1.5s fl. 0.5s, ec. 5.5s | 151 46 8 | White fiberglass tower, red band | 16. | |
| 663 | 2710.02; G 1304 | Pampa de los Indios. (A.) | 54°54.5′S 67°05.6′W | Fl.W. period 5s fl. 0.5s, ec. 4.5s | 6 | White round tower, black bands | 21. | |
| 664 | 2710.05; G 1302 | Islas Becasses. (A.) | 54°57.1′S 67°02.0′W | Fl.W. period 3s fl. 0.6s, ec. 2.4s | 128 39 6 | White round tower, red bands | 13. | |
| 665 | 2710.07; G 1300 | Davison. (A.) | 54°56.4′S 66°54.4′W | Fl.(2)W. period 16s fl. 1s, ec. 4s fl. 1s, ec. 10s | 26 8 6 | White truncated pyramidal tower, red bands | 23. | Obscured 093° to coast W. of light. |
| 666 | 2710.09; G 1298 | Isla Gardiner. | 55°00.4′S 66°55.7′W | Fl.(4)W. period 12s fl. 0.5s, ec. 1.5s fl. 0.5s, ec. 1.5s fl. 0.5s, ec. 1.5s fl. 0.5s, ec. 5.5s | 62 19 7 | White fiberglass tower, black band | 20. | Visible 116°-290°. |
| 667 | 2710.12; G 1296 | Punta Moat. (A.) | 55°00.1′S 66°43.6′W | Fl.W. period 8s fl. 1s, ec. 7s 8 | | Black truncated pyramidal tower, yellow bands | 39. | |
| 668 | 2710.16; G 1294 | Punta Waller, Isla Nueva. | 55°10.3′S 66°33.7′W | Fl.W. period 5s | 39 12 13 | White fiberglass tower, black band | 20. | Visible 060°-262°. |

== Paso Picton ==
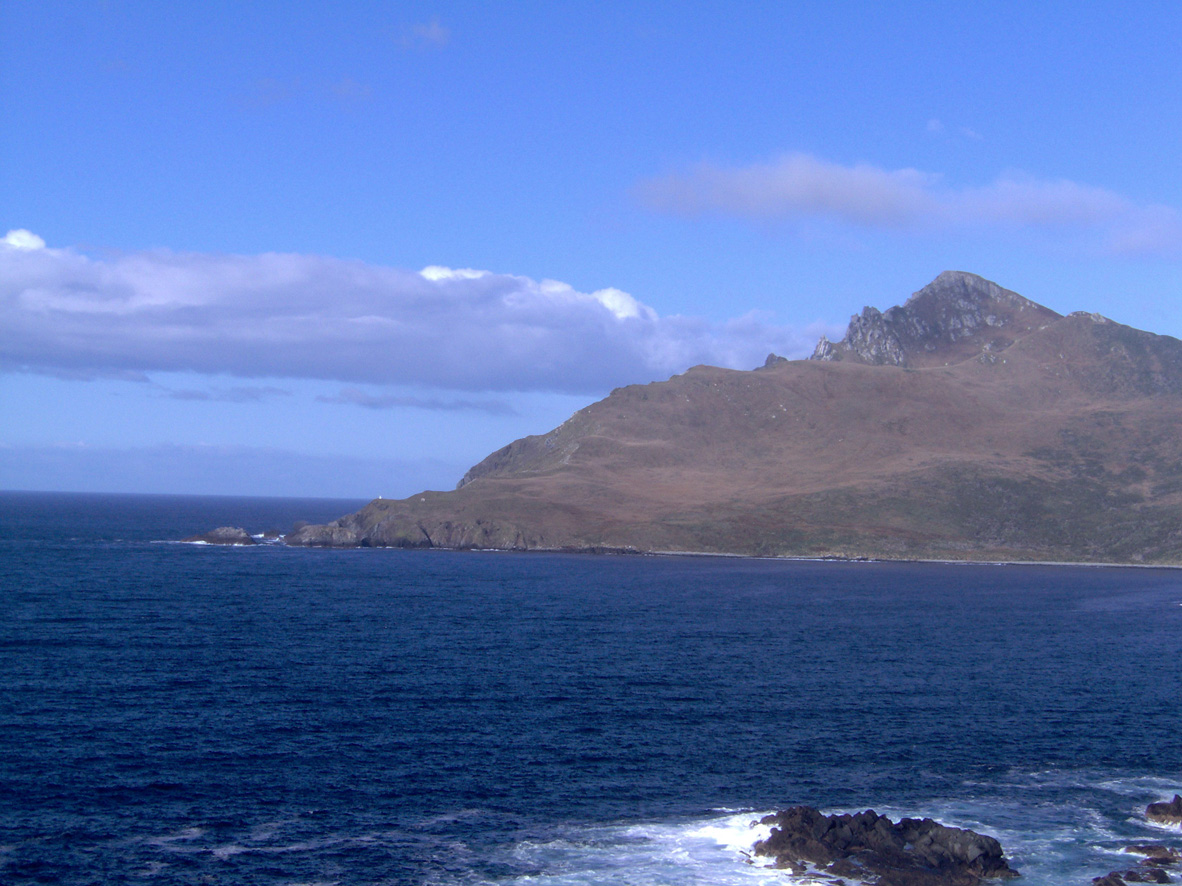
Lighthouse in Cape Horn

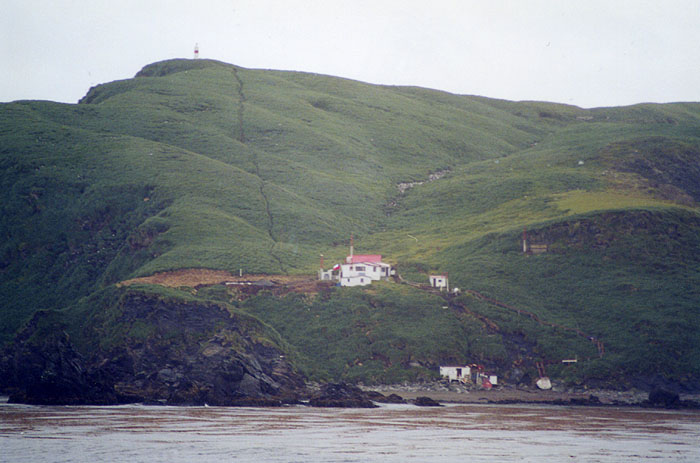
The last one: lighthouse in Diego Ramírez Islands

| It. | NGA/Int number | Location | Coordinates | Light characteristic | Height (ft/m) Range (nmi) | Structure description | Height (ft) | Remarks |
|---|---|---|---|---|---|---|---|---|
| 669 | 2710.5; G 1303 | Puerto Toro | 55°04.6′S 67°04.0′W | Fl.W. period 5s fl. 0.4s, ec. 4.6s | 23 7 6 | White fiberglass tower, red band | 13. | Visible 150°-301°. |
| 670 | 2711; G 1295 | Isla Nueva, Cape Graham | 55°16.4′S 66°31.5′W | Fl.W. period 10s fl. 0.2s, ec. 9.8s | 886 270 14 | White fiberglass tower, black band | 13. | Visible 210°-060°. |
| 671 | 2711.4; G 1295.2 | Isla Epave. | 55°48.0′S 67°22.3′W | Fl.R. period 10s fl. 1s, ec. 9s | 16 5 6 | Red fiberglass tower; | 11. | Visible 093°-295°. |
| 672 | 2711.6; G 1295.4 | Rocas González. | 55°48.0′S 67°19.0′W | Fl.R. period 5s fl. 1s, ec. 4s | 20 6 4 | Red fiberglass tower | 11. | |
| 673 | 2712; G 1336 | Cape Horn, on southern extremity of Hornos Island. | 55°58.6′S 67°15.5′W | Fl.W. period 12s fl. 0.5s, ec. 11.5s | 132 40 7 | White fiberglass tower, red band | 13. | Visible 249°-080°. |
| 674 | 2713; G 1336.5 | Monumental (Hornos Island); RACON | 55°57.9′S 67°13.2′W | Fl.W. period 5s fl. 0.7s, ec. 4.3s N (– •) | 202 62 12; 15 | White round iron tower, red bands | 38. | Visible 127°-056°. |
| 675 | 2714 | Paso del Mar. | 55°52.7′S 67°10.6′W | Fl.G. period 5s | 98 30 4 | PORT (B) GW, metal pillar, topmark | 10. | Visible 155°-345°. |
| 676 | 2718; G 1338 | Diego Ramírez Islands | 56°31.2′S 68°42.5′W | Fl.W. Period 15s | 354 108 22 | White fiberglass tower, red band | 16. | Visible 176°–088° and 094°–150°. |

== See also ==
- List of fjords, channels, sounds and straits of Chile
- List of islands of Chile
