= Magdalena Island =

Magdalena Island may refer to:

- Magdalena Island, Magallanes Region, Chile, situated in the Strait of Magellan, forming part of The Penguins Natural Monument
- Magdalena Island, Aysén Region, Chile, located between the Moraleda Channel and the Puyuhuapi Channel, which belongs partially to the Isla Magdalena National Park
- Magdalena Island, Magdalena Bay, Baja California Sur, Mexico

== See also ==
- Magdalen Islands
