= End of the World Route =

Scenic route in Chile

The End of the World Route (Spanish: Ruta del Fin del Mundo) is a Chilean touristic scenic route located in the Magallanes and Chilean Antarctic Region, the most southerly region of the country. The term "end of the world" refers to Chile being the southernmost country in the world, which is why Chilean Patagonia, the southernmost natural region of the country and at the same time, the southernmost part of the American continent.

== Tourist attractions ==
Attractions that include this route are varied, among which the visit to the Torres del Paine National Park, the Cueva del Milodón Natural Monument (Milodon's Cave), the penguin sighting in Magdalena Island, as well as other species of the Chilean wildlife stand out. In a broad sense, the route also includes the Carretera Austral, which begins south of the Los Lagos Region and crosses through the Aysén Region. Additionally, the route includes the passage through the cities of Punta Arenas (regional capital), where cruise ships disembark with tourists throughout the year and has a free economic zone and museums, such as the Nao Victoria. From Punta Arenas, visitors can cross the Strait of Magellan by ferry to Porvenir, the main town on the Isla Grande de Tierra del Fuego. The town serves as a starting point for visiting traditional sheep-farming estancias and for accessing the King Penguin Nature Reserve, one of the few places in South America where a resident colony of king penguins can be observed. Further south, a tour of Navarino Island by land or by sea, where it is possible to visit the towns and villages of Puerto Williams, Caleta Eugenia and Puerto Toro, the southernmost human settlement in the Americas. As part of this route it is also possible to take a tour of the Patagonian fjords and channels.

== Gallery ==
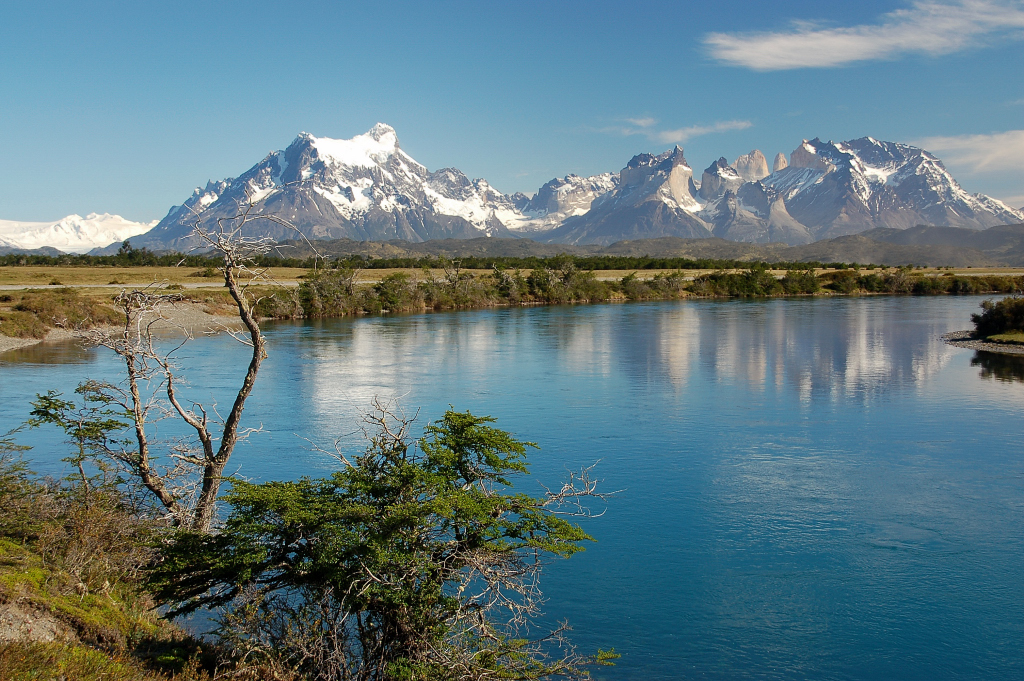
Torres del Paine National Park

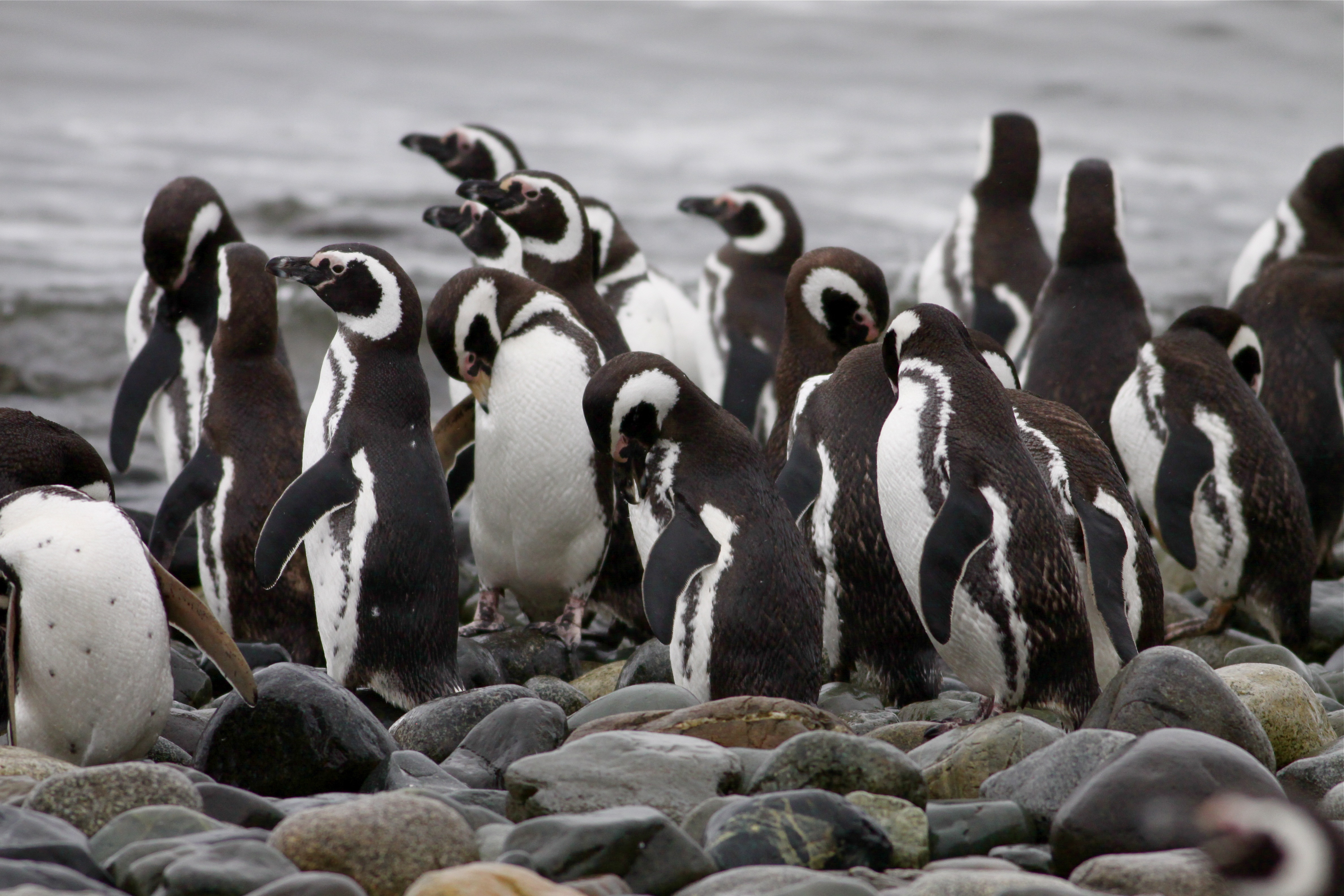
Magellanic penguins in Magdalena Island

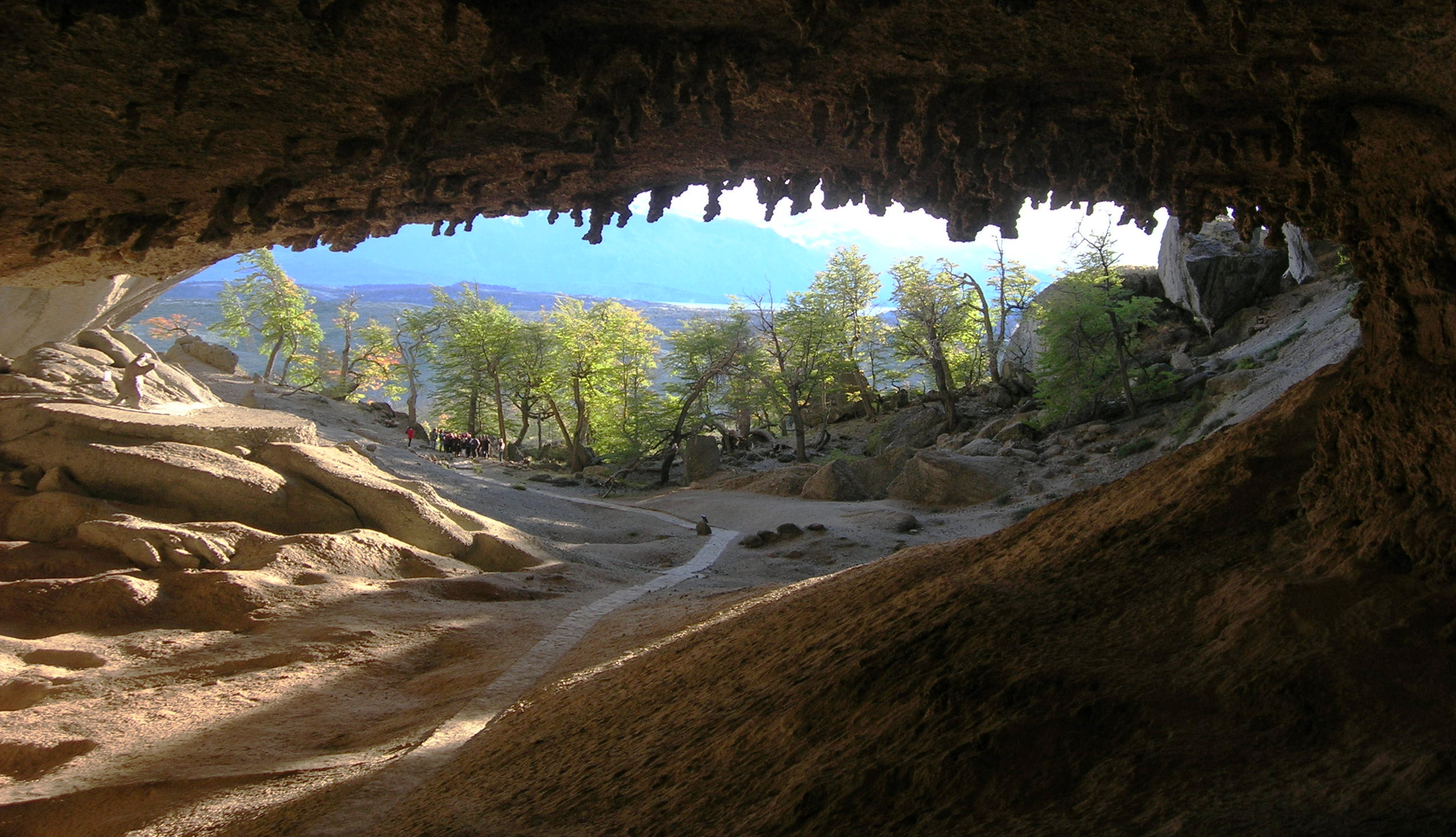
Cueva del Milodón Natural Monument

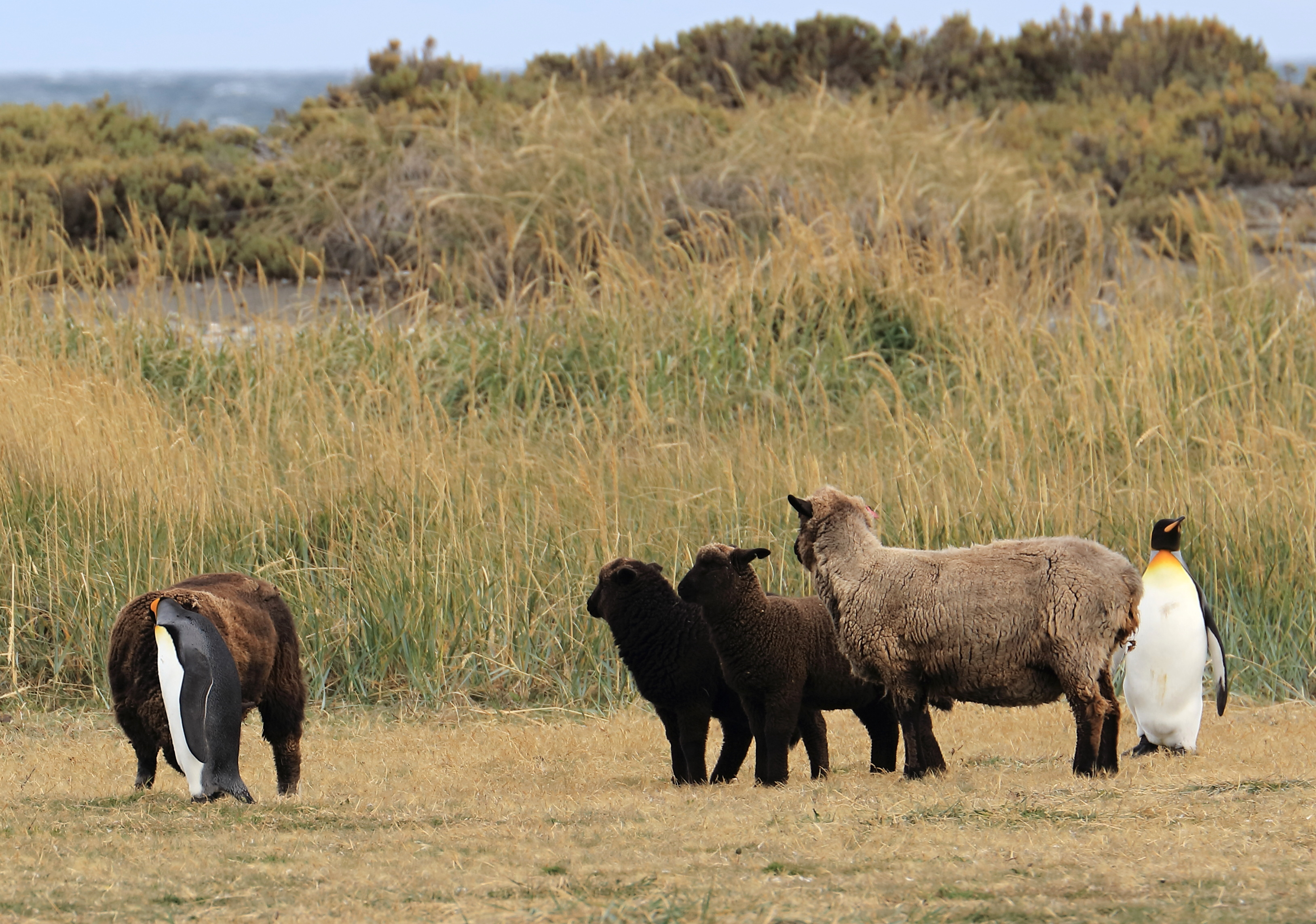
Sheep and king penguins together in Porvenir

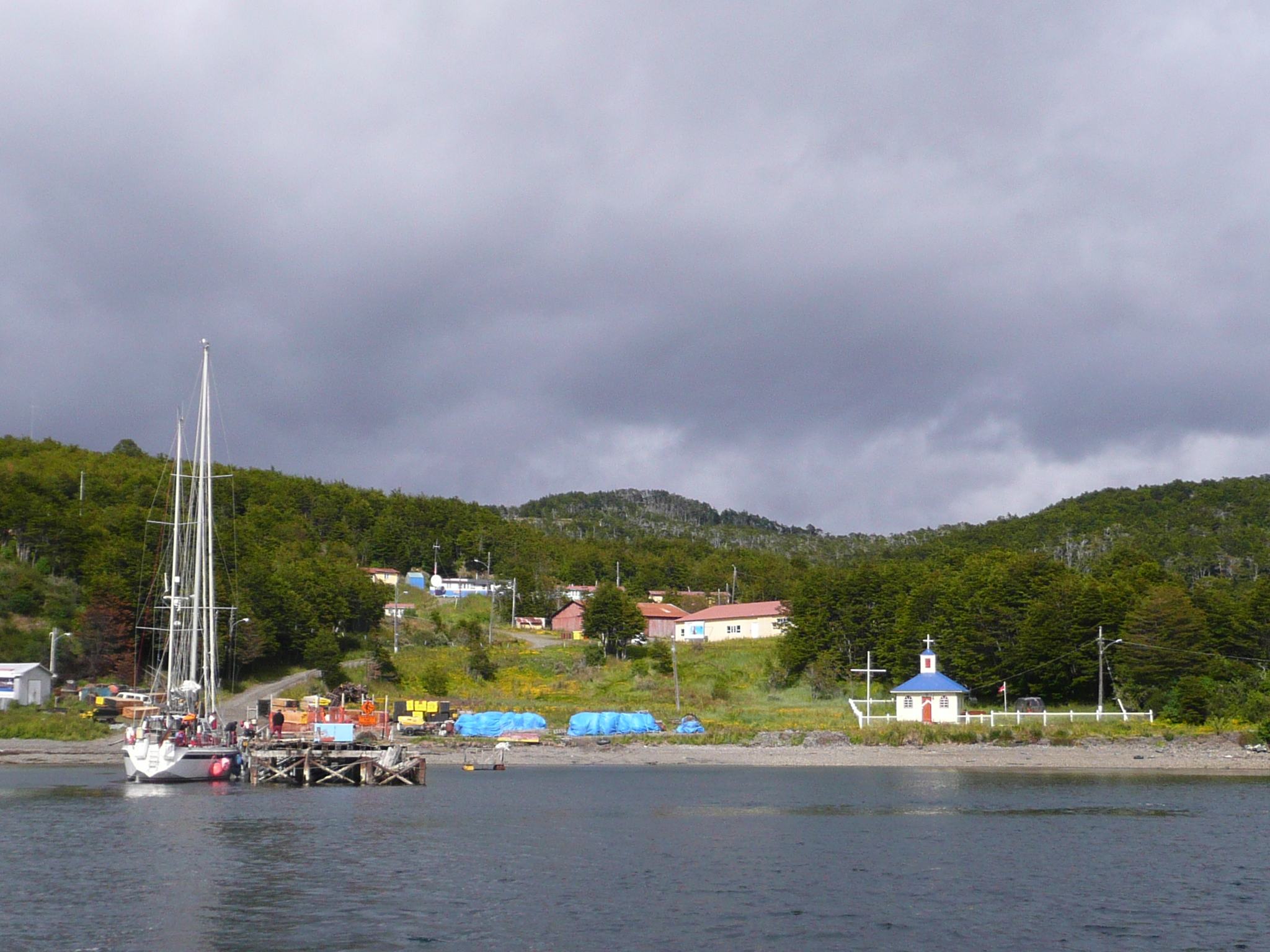
Puerto Toro, the southernmost human settlement of the Americas.

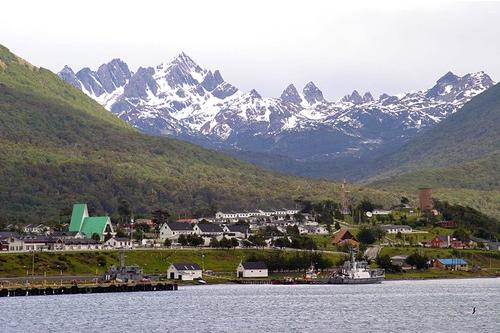
Puerto Williams
