= Marco Davison Bascur Airport =

- IATA: none; ICAO: SCID

Summary
- Airport type: Private
- Serves: Punta Arenas, Chile
- Location: Isabel Island
- Elevation AMSL: 30 ft / 9 m
- Coordinates: 52°52′50″S 70°45′00″W

Map
- Location of Marco Davison Bascur Airport in Chile

Runways
Direction	Length		Surface
Direction	m	ft	Surface
05/23	850	2,789	Asphalt
- Source: Landings.com Google Maps GCM

Marco Davison Bascur Airport (Spanish: Aeropuerto Marco Davison Bascur), (ICAO: SCID) is an airport on Isabel Island, an island in the Strait of Magellan, 29 kilometres (18 mi) north-northeast of Punta Arenas, the capital of the Magallanes Region of Chile.

== See also ==
- Transport in Chile
- List of airports in Chile
