= Los Pingüinos Natural Monument =

Monument on Magdalena Island, Magellanes, Chile

- IUCN category III (natural monument or feature)
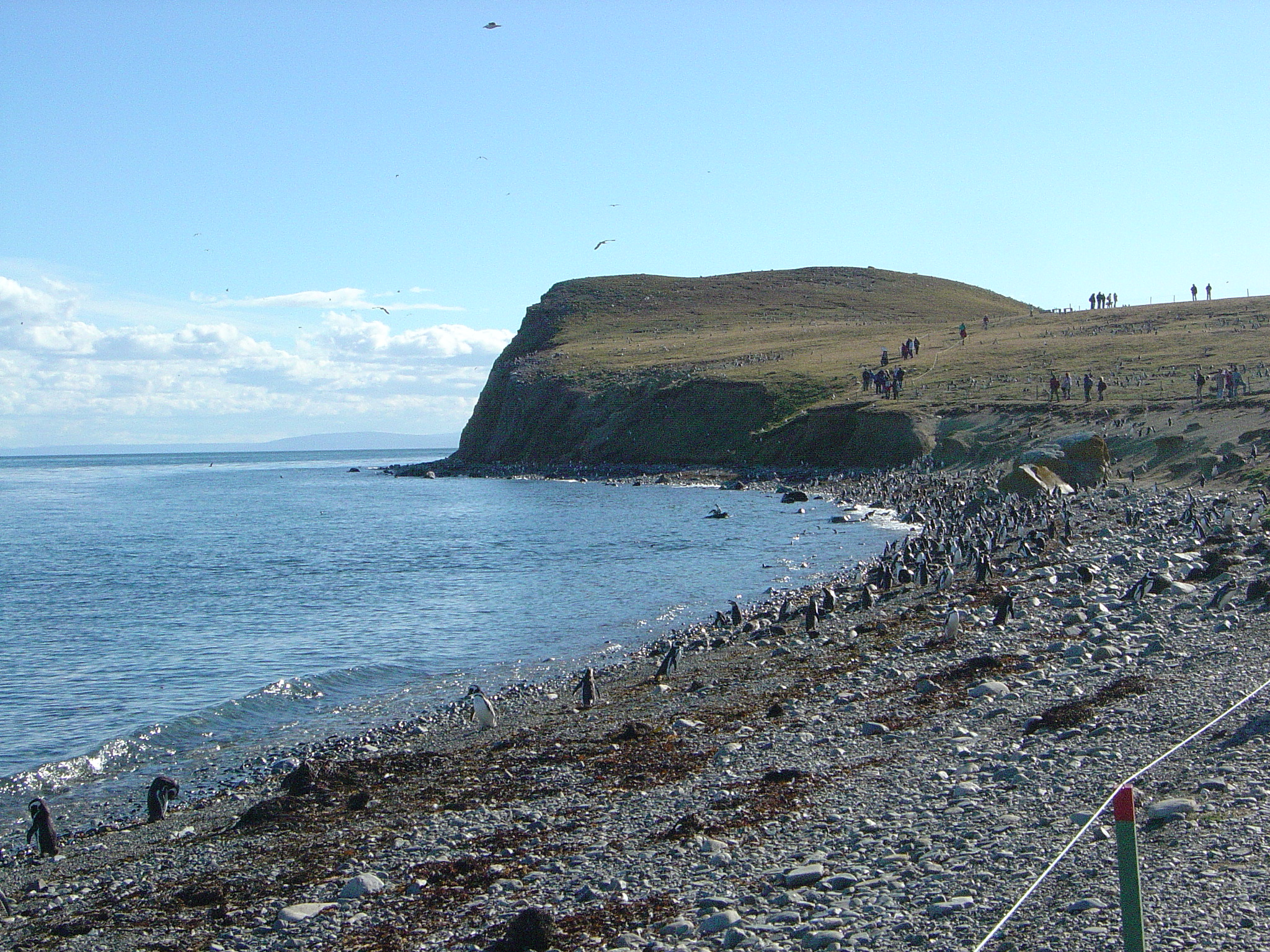
- Interactive map of Los Pingüinos Natural Monument
- Location: Magallanes Region, Chile
- Nearest city: Punta Arenas
- Coordinates: 52°55′10″S 70°34′41″W
- Area: 96 ha (240 acres)
- Established: 1966
- Governing body: Corporación Nacional Forestal (CONAF)

Los Pingüinos Natural Monument (Spanish: Monumento natural Los Pingüinos, English: The Penguins Natural Monument) is located 35 km (22 mi) northeast of Punta Arenas, Chile. Magdalena Island and the Marta Island, situated in the middle of the Strait of Magellan, is the main part of this natural monument. The largest penguin colonies of south Chile are on this island, including an estimated 60,000 breeding pairs of the Magellanic penguin.

The islands are currently uninhabited by humans, but are a popular tourist destination. Each summer, thousands of tourists travel to the monument to see the penguins and other wildlife. At 85 hectares, Magdalena Island is the larger of the two islands, and receives most of the tourist traffic, while Marta is made up of only 12 hectares of surface area, and is not often included in tours. CONAF (National Forest Corporation of Chile) manages the monument in an attempt to sustain both the tourism and the Magellanic penguins, for which the island has become a critical habitat.

Los Pinguinos Natural Monument, in the Middle of the map

== History ==
Prior to the 16th century, Magdalena and Marta Islands were inhabited by three pre-Hispanic cultures: the Selkʼnam, the Yaghan, and the Kawésqar. These people had very little effect on the islands as they had a small population and also spent much time fishing at sea, rather than being on the island. The Selknam were forced to leave after Spanish colonialists brought sheep to the region, which eliminated the habitat of the guanaco, an animal similar to an alpaca, that they hunted. The Yaghan and Kawesqar also eventually abandoned the area due to colonial pressure. Though people no longer live on the islands, the human impacts are likely much greater than where there were inhabitants because thousands of people visit the islands each year.

While many names for the islands have been used during early exploration by Spanish ships and pirates, their current names, Magdalena and Marta were given by a 16th-century Spanish explorer, Pedro Sarmiento de Gamboa. Little history of the island from the time of Spanish colonialism to the present day has been recorded.

== Description ==
The Pingüinos monument was founded in 1966 in an effort to protect the Magellanic penguin from the threat of fishing. Because the penguins feed on the same species that the fishing industry targets, high levels of fishing deplete the penguins’ food source, causing a decline in their population. In 1982, the monument was named a protected area. By having a 30-kilometer no-fishing zone around the island, and by preserving the island as a penguin-breeding site, the penguin population has recovered. Magellanic penguins have continued to thrive on the island: from 2000 to 2007, the population increased by 6%, and some penguins have migrated to a nearby island because Magdalena is running out of space.

=== Climate ===
The climate can be described as cold and rainy, with an average temperature of 46 F. There are not large seasonal changes other than the temperature shifts between summer and winter. During the winter, the temperature may drop below zero, and during the summer, it may reach 64 F. Average annual rainfall is 17 inches. High winds are reported by many who visit the monument.

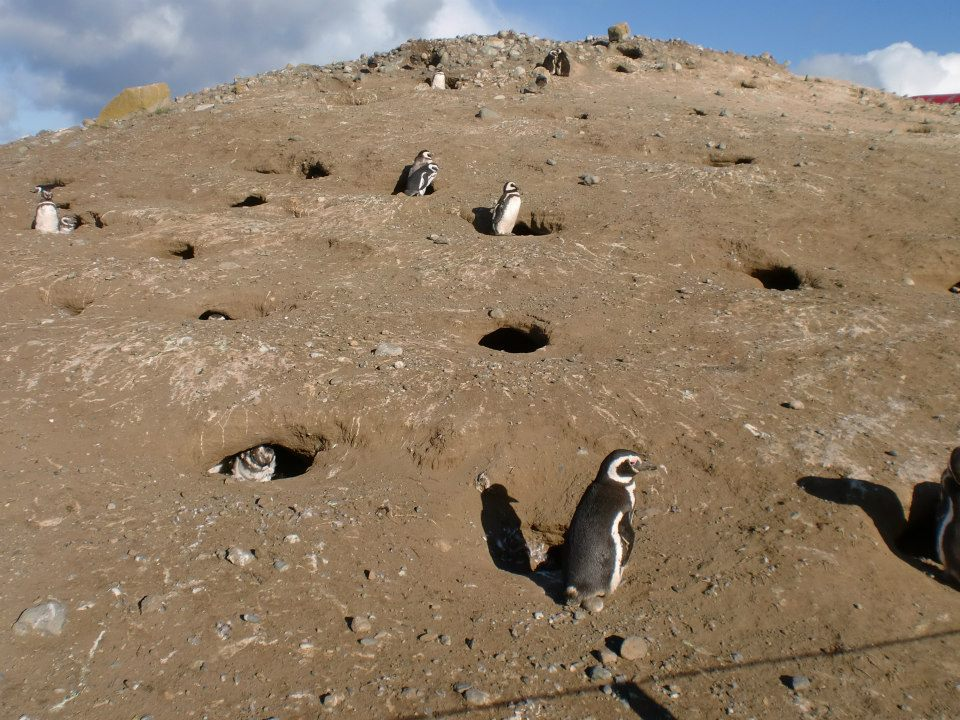
Magellanic penguins on Magdalena Island

=== Flora ===
Very few species of flora are found on the islands, which may be due to the cold, windy climate, as well as the rocky substrate that composes the island. One species of short grass is found across Magdalena island. The grass particularly thrives in areas with reduced animal populations. The ocean surrounding Magdalena Island supports a large kelp population.

=== Fauna ===
The most notable fauna found at the monument is the Magellanic penguin, for which the site was named. Over 60,000 pairs inhabit the island, and it is these penguins that attract tourists to the site. Other important fauna include the imperial shag, sea lions and south American fur seals, who are known to rest on the islands, and two species of seagull: the dolphin gull and the common gull. Some of the rocky shoreline supports a mussel population.

=== Threats to the penguin population ===
The Magellanic penguin is not an endangered species, but it is close to becoming a threatened species due to the habitat loss and resource scarcity in many regions of South America. The penguins have much higher birth rates and chick survival rates on Magdalena Island than at other nesting sites, which have been disturbed by human activity. Because the penguins face threats at other locations, the preservation of the natural monument has become much more important. The islands are an ideal resource for the penguins because of the low predator abundance, high food abundance, and the isolation of the islands from the developed world, especially when the islands are closed to tourists

Though tourism is well managed and does not pose a significant threat to the Magellanic penguins, there are several other potential problems that may arise for the penguins on Isla Magdalena. A minor concern is that many parts of the shoreline are experiencing erosion. The erosion is not occurring fast enough to require urgent attention, but over a longer timescale, it may decrease the surface area of the island and therefore the number of penguins that are able to nest there.

Another threat was discovered when the current monitoring program noticed a decline in penguin population during the summer of 2002–03. The monitoring report hypothesizes that the decline was due to a drought in the previous summer. The drought caused much of the grass covering the island to die, leaving the island susceptible to dust storms, which can destroy the penguin’s nests. Because drought has such a large impact on the penguins, climate change, which is expected to cause a decrease in annual rainfall, may pose a serious threat to the survival of the penguins.

Additionally, many boats transporting oil pass through the Strait of Magellan, which poses the risk of an oil spill. An oil spill has the potential to have a serious negative effect on the penguins. Because this sort of catastrophe is impossible to predict, it represents the most drastic effect that would require huge efforts to restore the penguin population, which, depending on the size of the spill, may not be possible. Even if there is no spill, the oil trade presents a risk. Once the oil tanks have been emptied, they are refilled with water. Then, when the water is released, oily substances can be discharged from the boat. These substances make the penguin feathers worse at insulating, so the penguins leave the water, and then are unable to hunt for food and thus starve to death. If ingested, the oil can hurt the penguin’s digestion and immune systems. There is not much that can be done to prevent these risks, other than cutting off the route through the Strait of Magellan, which may create too many complications for the oil industry for such a strategy to even be considered.

== Natural Monument ==
Los Pinguinos

Natural monuments are one of three types of protected areas of Chile. The purpose of Chile’s natural monuments is to protect some special feature of the natural environment, which may be the flora, fauna, or even the culture or history of the location. Sites are chosen as monuments because they represent an important part of Chilean identity and play a role in the development of the relationship between humans and the environment.

The Los pinguinos monument natural was created in 1966 to preserve the site as a breeding area for the penguins, as well as a habitat for other migratory birds. The monument also represents the cultural heritage of Chile, as it was inhabited by indigenous groups hundreds of years ago. Therefore, the conservation of the islands does not imply that humans must be kept out, rather that a sustainable relationship between the humans and the wildlife and landscape of the island must be maintained. Designating the site as a natural monument approaches the dual goals of maintaining the penguin population and celebrating the natural and cultural treasures of the country.

== Ecotourism ==
Monumento nacional los pinguinos is open from October through March. During the remainder of the year, the penguins are preparing for and engaging in breeding activity. During this time, humans are prohibited from the monument to prevent them from interfering. Additionally, tourism is also closed while the penguins are absent from the island during the winter, mostly because there is then little to see for the tourists and harsher weather. For Chilean citizens, the entry fee is 3,000 Chilean pesos (CLP), and for foreigners the fee is 5,000 CLP. Visitors must travel to the islands from Punta Arenas by ferry with a tourist company, which comes at an additional cost. There is a small museum on the island where tourists can learn about the history of the monument, as well as biological facts about the penguins. In addition to the attraction of the penguins, the island also contains a lighthouse, Faro Isla Magdalena, which was opened in 1901. Visitors can climb up the spiral staircase to the top, which is 14 meters high, to gain a view of the island and the surrounding ocean. While tourism is believed to be growing, there are no complete records of how many people visit the island, which makes assessing the impact of the tourist industry difficult.

Ecotourism represents a type of travel in which tourists aim to be responsible both in terms of conservation and of respect for local communities, and is often celebrated as a way to bring economic benefits into a region that has few other opportunities. Ideally, ecotourists have a low impact on the site they are visiting and in some way, at least economically, bring benefits to the region. In reality, ecotourists are not always perfect travellers, and may actually create some problems for the tourist site. Similarly, they may have conflicting expectations which make the management of the tourist site difficult. Ecotourists expect an authentic site, where they can observe the animals and environment as it occurs naturally, yet they are also interested in getting as close to the wildlife, in this case penguins, as possible. These desires are contradictory because the penguins that live on the side of the island without tourists behave much differently than the penguins that interact with tourists on a daily basis. The penguins on the tourist side have a very low fear of humans in comparison with those who do not often interact with humans, and will be less likely to flee when approached by a human. While this is desirable for the tourists, it is unclear whether this change in behavior ruins something about the authenticity of the experience. Some penguins benefit from the tourism; scientists hypothesize that predators avoid penguins that nest by humans, which showed us the results of human impacts having consequences that are hard to predict.

=== Concerns ===
There are many concerns about how tourism may threaten the conservation efforts on the island, specifically in terms of penguin populations. For example, near Chiloe on the west coast of Chile, there are high levels of fishing both to sustain the tourist population and from tourists who themselves wish to participate in fishing. Penguins are the main attraction for tourists and sustain the economy of the region, yet they are threatened by a decrease in food sources because of the high fishing levels. Another concern is that penguin behavior may change in the presence of humans, which may impact their viability and change the natural aspect of the environment. Penguins are shown to produce stress-related hormones when encountering humans, though penguins who live at tourist sites produce fewer hormones than those who do not, suggesting that they have adapted and become more comfortable in the presence of humans. Humbert penguins, for example, have been observed to have lower birth rates in the present of high tourism. Magellanic penguins are believed to be able to better tolerate humans than other penguin species that exhibit stress responses when even one person is spotted at a distance. While the Magellanic penguins may not be affected to the same degree it is still important to minimize human effects on them. Additionally, although Magellanic penguins may be able to adapt to the presence of humans, this does not necessarily occur quickly. Therefore, to give the penguins a chance to grow comfortable, it is important that some parts of the island are prevented from human intrusion. Having part of the area secluded allows penguins to become adapted at a distance before being comfortable enough to build nests in the human-visited areas.

=== Management strategies ===
Yearly surveys of the penguin population on Magdalena Island have shown that their population is thriving and they are not experiencing negative impacts due to tourism. The monitoring program that has been going on since 1999 has been affective in providing an assessment of the penguin population so that management practices that keep the population at sustainable levels can be employed. There are several management practices that have made the low level of impact possible. First, it is important that tourists remain on the marked path and do not cross the rope boundaries on either side. The path is 850 meters long and travels through much of the island, while still leaving large regions inaccessible to humans. By keeping tourists in limited areas, the effects of large numbers of tourists are minimized, and penguins maintain regions where they can avoid the stress caused by human presence. Additionally, the prohibition of fishing within 30 kilometers of the islands eliminates fishing as a tourist attraction. The lack of fishing as an option minimizes the impact of tourists on the environment and allows for sustainable tourism without threatening the food source of the penguins. Another factor that improves the viability of tourism at the monument is the education that is provided to tourists as they travel to Magdalena Island. Reaching the island requires an hour-long ferry ride, in which most tour companies show an informational video and discuss what tourists can expect on their visit to the island and how they should behave. This information may play a critical role in limiting human impacts and potential destruction from tourists on the island. Similarly, the ferry system provides a large number of jobs for local people, including people to drive the boat, tour guides to speak during the journey, and ship attendants to sell food and direct tourists while on the boat. The ferry system therefore gives the Los Pingüinos national monument an advantage over other sites that may struggle to find ways to increase the economic gains without some loss of environmental resources.

== See also ==
- Magdalena Island
