= Magdalena Island, Magallanes Region =

Island in Chile

Magdalena Island
Native name: Isla Magdalena
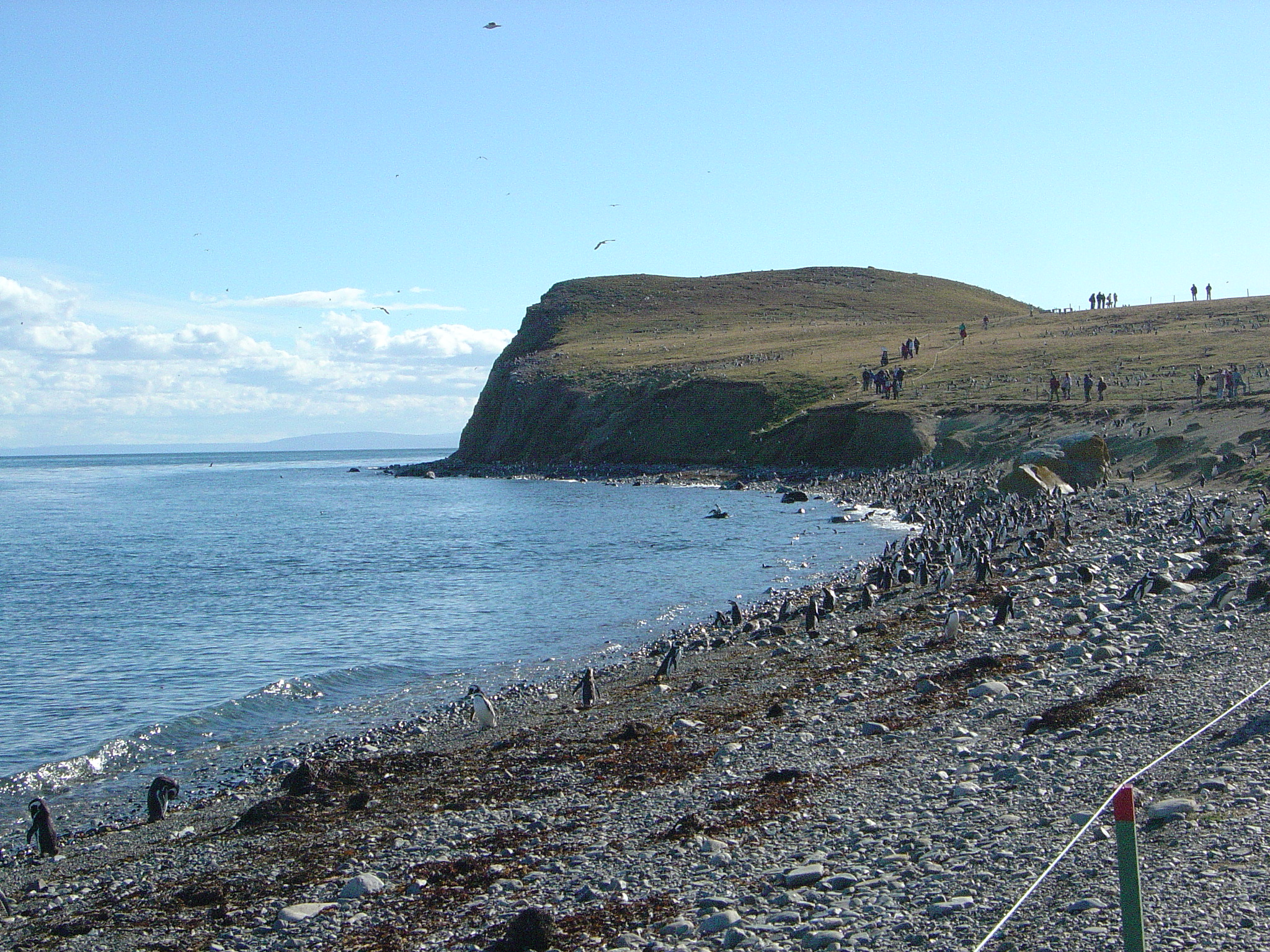
- The penguin's colony upon the island

Geography
- Location: Strait of Magellan
- Coordinates: 52°55′10″S 70°34′34″W
- Highest elevation: 27 m (89 ft)

Administration
- Chile

Magdalena Island (Spanish: Isla Magdalena) is a small island in the Strait of Magellan, Chile. It is occupied year round by a small force of park rangers: six in summer, three in winter. "Newbie" or first-year rangers are not permitted to volunteer for harsh winter duty. They barrack in the single substantial building attached to the Magdalena Island light. The island is part of the End of the World Route, a scenic touristic route.

== History ==
Magellan saw the island as he passed for the first time in the strait. Antonio Pigafetta, while speaking about the desertion of the San Antonio cites in his famous book, The First Voyage Round the World (Chap.79), that in order to alert the crew of a ship if it ever tried to get back:

This manner of acting had been ordained by the captain from the commencement, in order to effect the junction of any ship which might be separated from the others. So the people of the said ship did what the captain had commanded them, and more, for they set two ensigns with letters; one of the ensigns was placed on a small hill at the first bay, the other on an islet in the third bay, where there were many sea wolves and large birds.

== Geography ==
It is located in Magallanes Region about 32 km northeast of the regional capital Punta Arenas. In 1982, it and nearby Marta Island were declared a national monument—Los Pingüinos Natural Monument. The island is the breeding location for several species of seabirds, most notably the Magellanic penguin. The penguin colony on the island has been monitored since 1998 and was estimated to hold 63,000 breeding pairs in 2007. With the exception of the Park Rangers, the island is currently uninhabited.

== Penguin population ==
Penguins on Magdalena Island have declined for different reasons. Current data indicate that tourism is not the cause of the decline, and even has a minor role in improving breeding success for a few hundred penguins nesting alongside the tourist path. The main predator of penguin chicks on Magdalena Island is the skua (Stercorarius chilensis). The skua is very shy and avoids areas frequented by tourists. A reduction in the abundance of the skua decreases the mortality of chicks and increases the breeding success of the penguins.

Penguin populations stood at 59,000 breeding pairs in 2000/01, 63,000 pairs in 2008/09, and 43,000 pairs in 2018/19. In 2009 and 2010 the island suffered a severe drought that killed off all the vegetation leaving just bare soil. Without vegetation, the wind caused loose soil to be blown across the island, covering and burying burrows, eggs and chicks. This caused very low breeding success, and reduced the available nesting area of the island. As a result, in the reduction of suitable breeding area, the penguin population has declined to 43,000 pairs by 2018/19. with many penguins moving to the nearby colony at Cabo Virgenes in Argentina.
