= List of glaciers in South America =

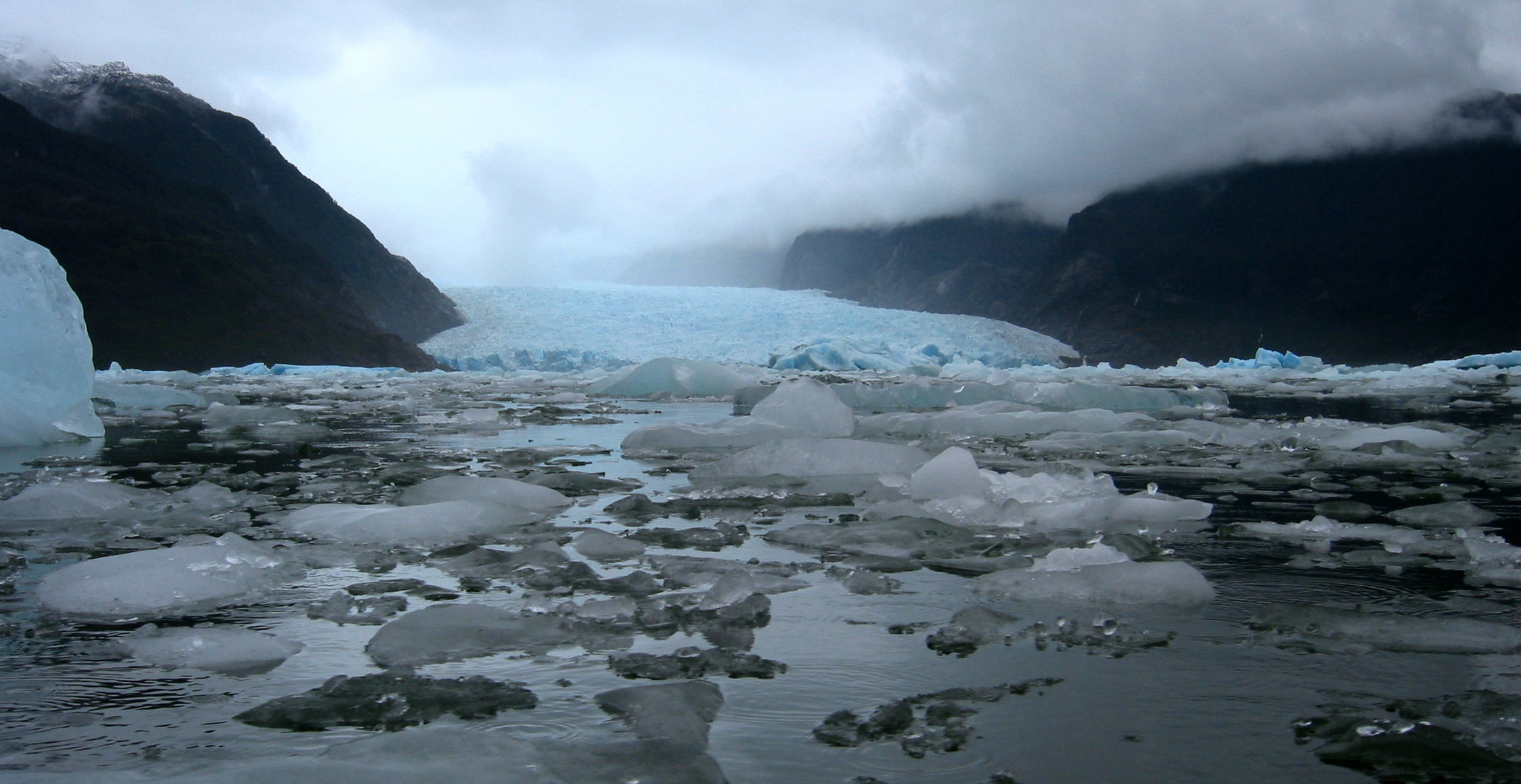
San Rafael Glacier, Chile.

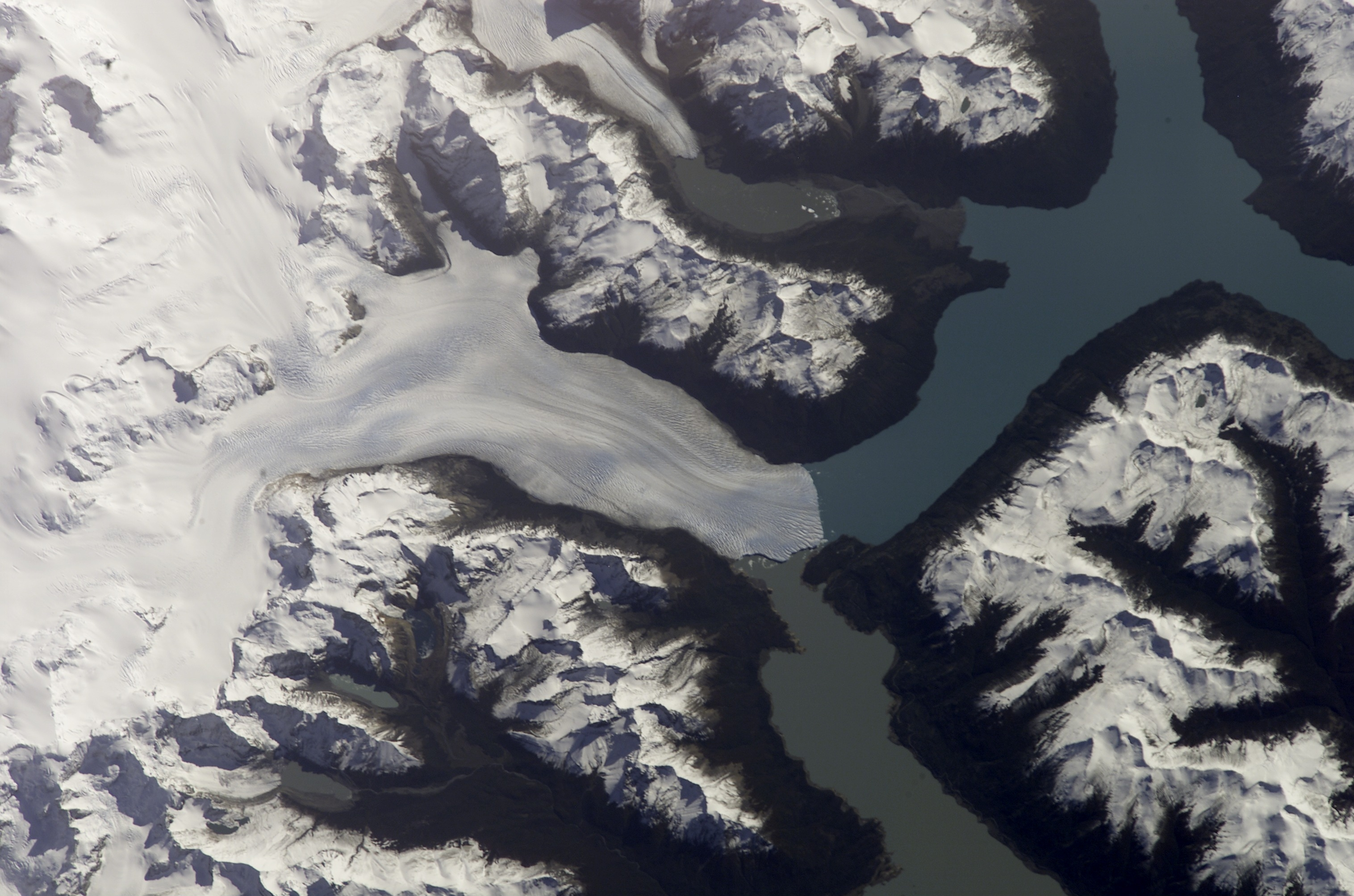
Perito Moreno Glacier, Argentina as seen from space.

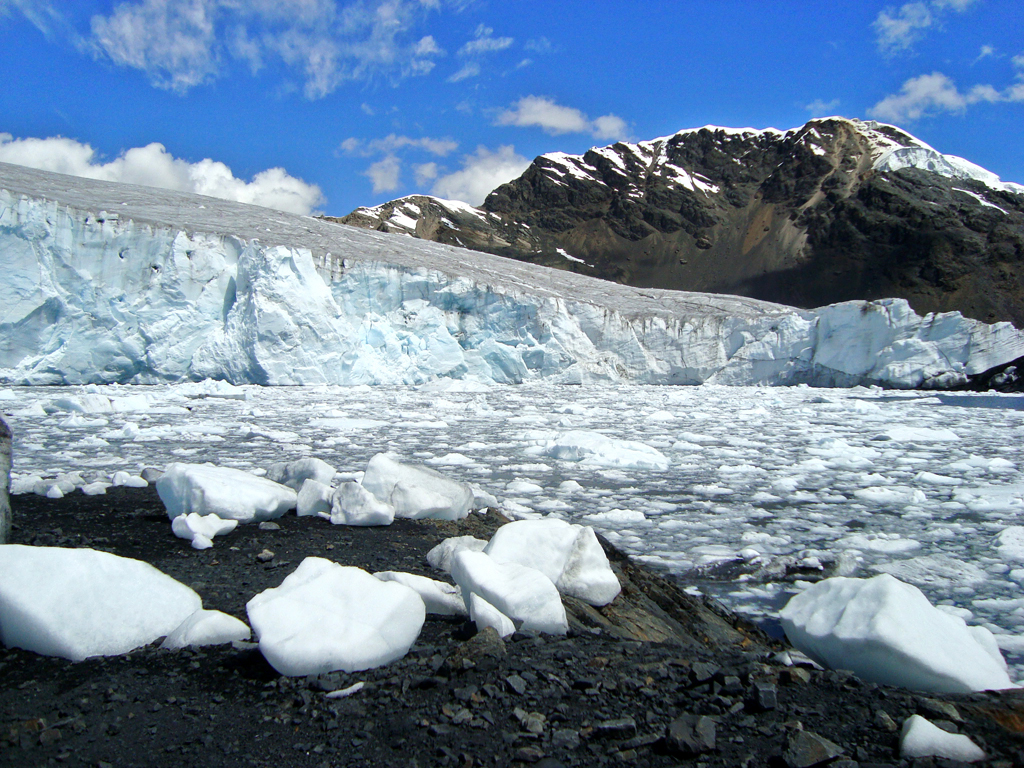
Pastoruri Glacier, Peru.

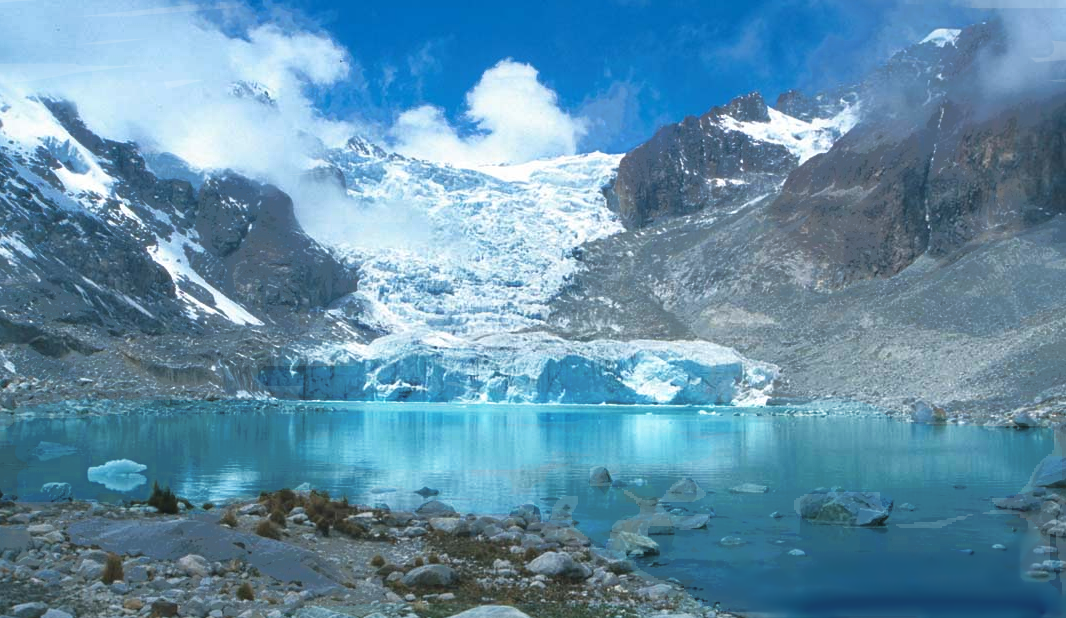
Glacier Lagoon, Bolivia.

Glaciers in South America develop exclusively on the Andes and are subject to the Andes various climatic regimes namely the Tropical Andes, Dry Andes and the Wet Andes. Apart from this there is a wide range of altitudes on which glaciers develop from 5000 m in the Altiplano mountains and volcanoes to reaching sealevel as tidewater glaciers from San Rafael Lagoon (45° S) and southwards. South America hosts two large ice fields, the Northern and Southern Patagonian Ice Fields, of which the second is the largest contiguous body of glaciers in extrapolar regions. By surface about 80% of South America's glaciers lie in Chile.

== List of glaciers ==
=== Argentina ===
- Perito Moreno Glacier
- Polish Glacier
- Southern Patagonian Ice Field - Argentina/Chile
- Upsala Glacier
- Spegazzini Glacier
- Mayo Glacier
- Onelli Glacier
- Torre Glacier
- Negro Glacier
- Frías Glacier
- Alerce Glacier
- Castaño Overo Glacier
- Manso Glacier
- Peulla Glacier
- Casa Pangue Glacier
- Río Blanco Glacier
- Torrecillas Glacier
- Ventisquero Negro
- Viedma Glacier
- Lagrimas Glacier

=== Bolivia ===
- Chacaltaya

=== Chile ===
- Amalia Glacier
- Colonia Glacier
- Bernardo Glacier
- Brüggen Glacier or Pío XI Glacier
- Dickson Glacier
- Francia Glacier
- Garibaldi Glacier
- Grandes Ventisqueros
- Gran Campo Nevado
- Grey Glacier
- Holanda Glacier
- Italia Glacier
- Jorge Montt Glacier
- Juncal Norte Glacier
- Juncal Sur Glacier
- La Paloma Glacier
- Leones Glacier
- Los Perros Glacier
- Marinelli Glacier
- Nef Glacier
- Mocho-Choshuenco
- Northern Patagonian Ice Field
- O'Higgins Glacier
- Pingo Glacier
- Queulat Glacier
- Romanche Glacier
- San Francisco Glacier
- San Quintín Glacier
- San Rafael Glacier
- Serrano Glacier
- Soler Glacier
- Southern Patagonian Ice Field - Chile/Argentina
- Steffen Glacier
- Stoppani Glacier
- Tyndall Glacier or Geike Glacier
- Universidad Glacier
- Yelcho Glacier

=== Colombia ===
- Nevado del Ruiz
- Ritacuba Blanco
- Sierra Nevada de Santa Marta
- Snow Mountain of Quindio

=== Ecuador ===
- Antisana
- El Altar
- Cayambe
- Chimborazo
- Cotopaxi

=== Peru ===
- Quelccaya Ice Cap
- Pastoruri Glacier
- Artesonraju Glacier
- Llaca Glacier
- Arhuey Glacier
- Veronica Glacier

== See also ==
- Geography of South America
