= List of glaciers of Chile =

The glaciers of Chile cover 2.7% (20,188 km^{2}) of the land area of the country, excluding Antártica Chilena, and have a considerable impact on its landscape and water supply. By surface 80% of South America's glaciers lie in Chile. Glaciers develop in the Andes of Chile from 27˚S southwards and in a very few places north of 18°30'S in the extreme north of the country: in between they are absent because of extreme aridity, though rock glaciers formed from permafrost are common. The largest glaciers of Chile are the Northern and Southern Patagonian Ice Fields. From a latitude of 47° S and south some glaciers reach sea level.

Apart from height and latitude, the settings of Chilean glaciers depend on precipitation patterns; in this sense two different regions exist: the Dry Andes and the Wet Andes.

== List of ice fields ==
This is a list of the ice fields of Chile.

Name	Area (km²)	Regions of Chile	Coordinates
Northern Patagonian Ice Field	4,200	Aisén	47°00′S 73°30′W
Southern Patagonian Ice Field	14,200 (of 16,800)	Aisén and Magallanes	
Cordillera Darwin	2,300	Magallanes	
Gran Campo Nevado	200	Magallanes	52°50′S 73°10′W
Grandes Ventisqueros		Magallanes	

== List of glaciers ==
=== North ===
- Tapado Glacier
- Tronquitos Glacier

=== Center ===
- Universidad Glacier
- Cipreses Glacier
- San Francisco Glacier
- Esmeralda Glacier
- Juncal Norte Glacier

=== South ===
- Garibaldi Glacier
- Schiaparelli Glacier
- Balmaceda Glacier
- Tyndall Glacier or Geike Glacier
- Grey Glacier
- Amalia Glacier
- Dickson Glacier
- Ameghino Glacier
- Speghazzini Glacier
- Upsala Glacier
- Viedma Glacier
- Southern Patagonian Ice Field
- Brüggen Glacier or Pío XI Glacier
- Chico Glacier
- O'Higgins Glacier
- Tempano Glacier
- Ofhidro Glacier
- Jorge Montt Glacier
- Steffen Glacier
- Colonia Glacier
- Nef Glacier
- Northern Patagonian Ice Field
- Soler Glacier
- San Quintín Glacier
- San Rafael Glacier
- Gualas Glacier
- Hudson Volcano
- Michinmahuida Volcano
- Blanco Chico Glacier
- Casa Pangue Glacier
- Villarrica Glacier
- Bernardo Glacier

(Following Glaciers aren't in the list of http://www.glaciologia.cl)

- Alemania Glacier
- Darwin Glacier
- Exploradores Glacier
- Francia Glacier
- Grandes Ventisqueros
- Gran Campo Nevado
- Holanda Glacier
- Italia Glacier
- La Paloma Glacier
- Leones Glacier
- Los Perros Glacier
- Marinelli Glacier
- Mocho-Choshuenco
- Patagonian Ice Sheet†
- Pingo Glacier
- Queulat Glacier
- Romanche Glacier
- Serrano Glacier
- Stoppani Glacier
- Yelcho Glacier
