= Geology of Chile =

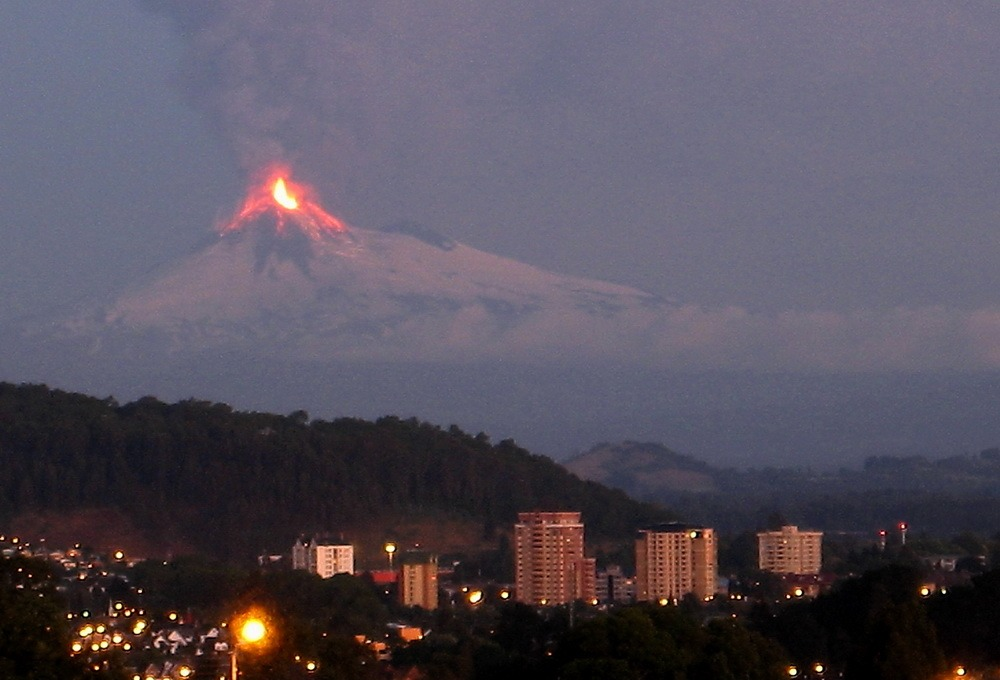
Llaima volcano in eruption

The geology of Chile is a characterized by processes linked to subduction, such as volcanism, earthquakes, and orogeny. The building blocks of Chile's geology were assembled during the Paleozoic Era when Chile was the southwestern margin of the supercontinent Gondwana. In the Jurassic, Gondwana began to split, and the ongoing period of crustal deformation and mountain building known as the Andean orogeny began. In the Late Cenozoic, Chile definitely separated from Antarctica, and the Andes experienced a significant rise accompanied by a cooling climate and the onset of glaciations.

The subduction interactions shaped four main morphostructures of Chile: the Andes, the Intermediate Depression, the Coast Range, and the Peru–Chile Trench off the coast. Since Chile is on an active continental margin, it has many volcanoes. Almost the entire country is subject to earthquakes arising from strains in the Nazca and Antarctic plates or shallow strike-slip faults. Northern Chilean mineral resources are a major economic resource, and the country is the leading producer of copper, lithium and molybdenum. Most of these mineral deposits were created from magmatic hydrothermal activity, and the water required to form those deposits derived from the subducted slab of the oceanic crust beneath the Andes.

The Chilean Easter Island and Juan Fernández Archipelago are volcanic hotspot islands in the eastward-moving Nazca plate. The geology of the Chilean Antarctic Territory has various commonalities with that of mainland Chile.

== General characteristics ==
The three primary morphological features derived from the Andes are the Andes Mountains proper, the Chilean Coast Range and the Chilean Central Valley, also known as the Intermediate Depression and the Longitudinal Valley. The mountains run parallel in a north–south direction from Morro de Arica to Taitao Peninsula, making up most of Chile's land surface. South of Taitao, only the Andes Mountains are present.

North of the Taitao Peninsula, the Peru–Chile Trench subduction zone is the boundary between the South American and Nazca plates. At Taitao, the Chile triple junction and the Nazca plate subduct the South American plate.

=== The Andes ===
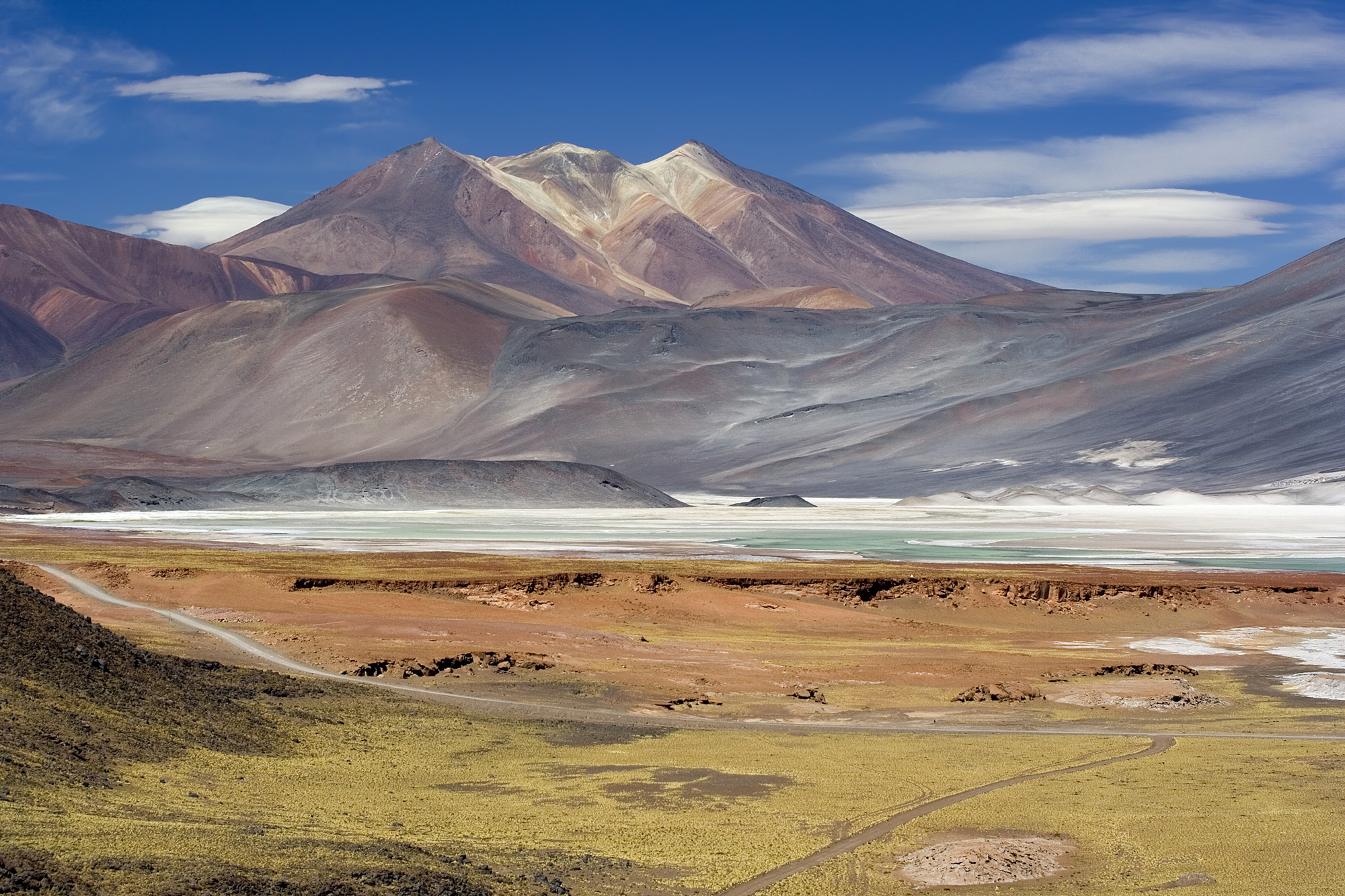
The Andes are generally higher in northern Chile.

In Norte Grande the mountains form a series of plateaus, such as Puna de Atacama and the Altiplano. At a south latitude of 27 degrees, Chile's highest mountain (Ojos del Salado) reaches a height of 6,893 metres (22,615 ft). Below 42 degrees south, the Andes split into a fjord landscape and the highest mountain is Monte San Valentin at 4,058 metres (13,314 ft) at north of Northern Patagonian Ice Field. As the mountains ebb, the snow line lowers; in the Llanquihue it is at 1,200 metres (3,900 ft), and 900 metres (3,000 ft) in the Magallanes.

=== Intermediate Depression ===
The Intermediate Depression, a series of faults running north to south, separates the Andes from the Coast Range with a steady decrease in altitude as the latitude increases. In Norte Grande the Intermediate Depression is partially covered by a series of salt flats, and has the world's largest potassium nitrate deposits. In Norte Chico, the depression disappears briefly before reappearing in a narrow valley at Santiago. From the narrows southward the valley widens until it is interrupted near Loncoche by the Bahía Mansa Metamorphic Complex (part of the Coast Range), then widening at Los Llanos (near Paillaco). In central and southern Chile (33°–42° south), the landscape is partially covered with glacial sediments from the Andes. In Zona Austral (south of 42° south) the depression dips below sea level, appearing occasionally in islands such as Chiloé. Its southern end is the Isthmus of Ofqui.

=== Chilean Coast Range ===
The Chilean Coast Range runs southward along the coast (parallel to the Andes) from Morro de Arica to Taitao Peninsula, ending at the Chile triple junction. The range, a combined horst, forearc high and accretionary wedge, was separated from the Andes during the Tertiary rise due to the subsidence of the Intermediate Depression.

== Geologic history ==
Pangaea separation animation

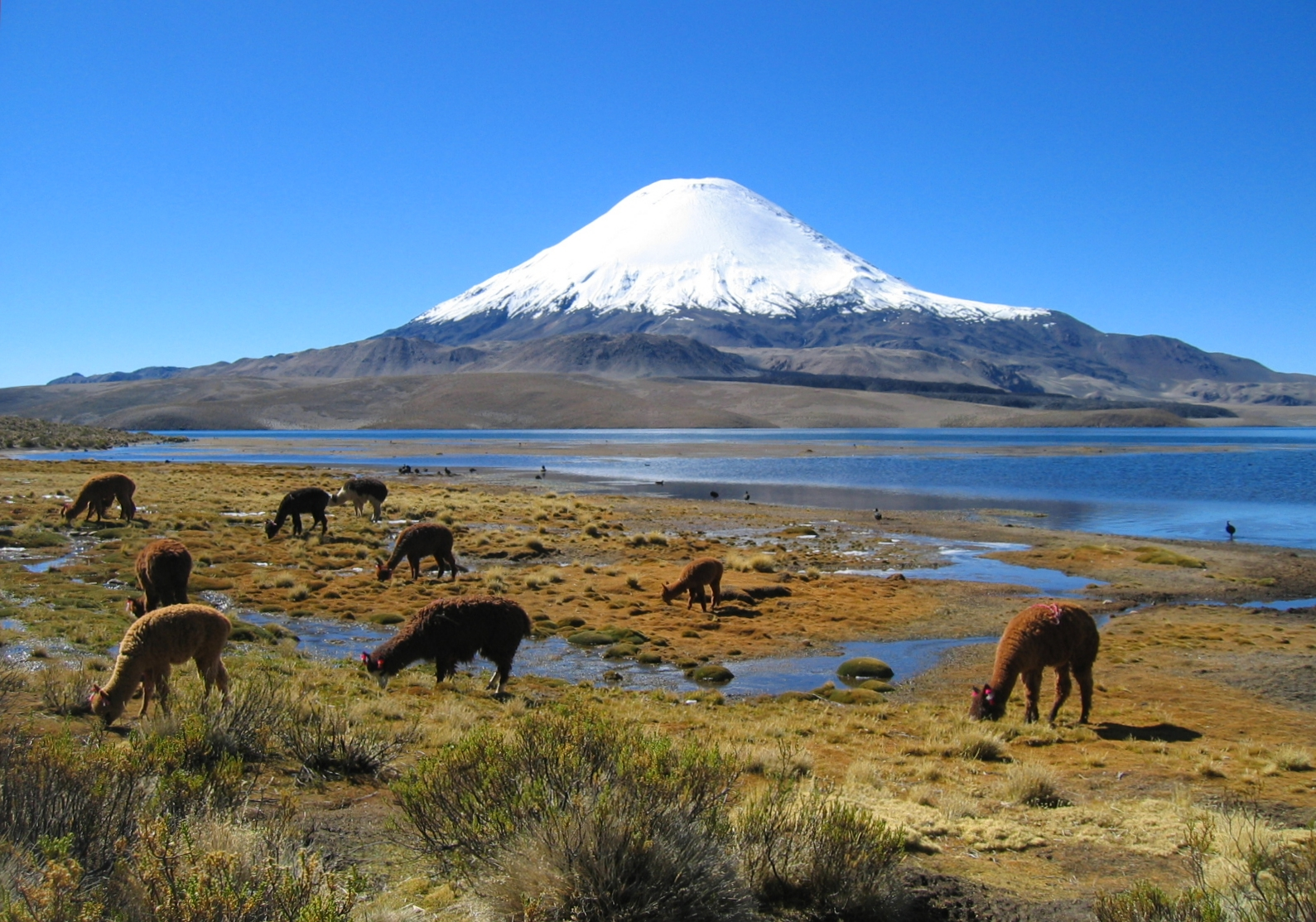
View of the Altiplano plateau in northern Chile

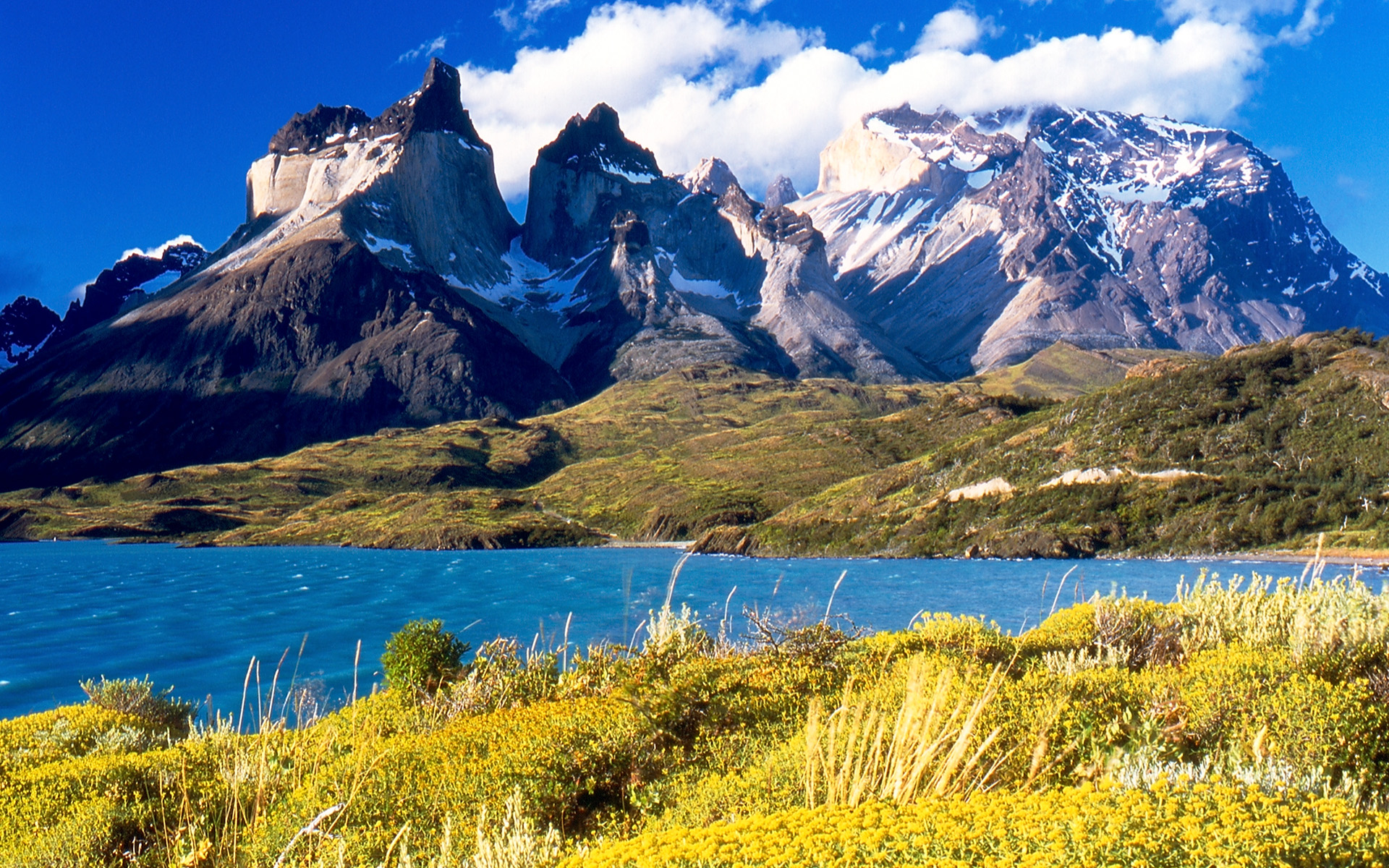
The mountains at Torres del Paine National Park have been heavily eroded by the Quaternary glaciations.

Retreat of the San Rafael Glacier from 1990 to 2000

=== Paleozoic Era ===
The oldest rocks in Chile are micaceous schists, phyllites, gneisses and quartzites, many examples of which are found in the Coast Range of south-central Chile. The schists of southern Chile were initially formed by sediment in the proto-Pacific Ocean, and later metamorphosed in the forearc wedge of the Peru–Chile Trench.

=== Mesozoic Era ===
During the Triassic Period about 250 million years ago Chile was part of the supercontinent Pangaea, which concentrated the world's major land masses. Africa, Antarctica, Australia and India were near Chile. When Pangaea began to split apart during the Jurassic period, South America and the adjacent land masses formed Gondwana. Floral affinities among these now-distant landmasses date from the Gondwanaland period. South America separated from Antarctica and Australia 27 million years ago with the development of the Drake Passage. Across the 1,000-kilometre (620 mi)-wide Drake Passage lie the mountains of the Antarctic Peninsula, south of the Scotia plate, which appear to be a continuation of the Andes. In the extreme south, the Magallanes–Fagnano Fault separates Tierra del Fuego from the small Scotia plate.

The formation of the Andes began during the Jurassic. During the Cretaceous, the Andes began to assume their present form by the uplifting, faulting and folding of sedimentary and metamorphic rocks of ancient cratons. Tectonic forces along the subduction zone along the west coast of South America continue to their orogenesis, resulting in earthquakes and volcanic eruptions to this day.

=== Cenozoic Era ===
The Altiplano plateau was formed during the Tertiary, with several mechanisms proposed; all attempt to explain why the topography of the Andes incorporates a large area of low relief at high altitude (high plateau):

1. Existence of weaknesses in the Earth's crust prior to tectonic shortening. Such weaknesses would cause the partition of tectonic deformation and uplift into eastern and western cordillera, leaving the necessary space for the formation of the Altiplano basin.
2. Magmatic processes rooted in the asthenosphere might have contributed to uplift the plateau.
3. Climate controlled the spatial distribution of erosion and sediment deposition, creating the lubrication along the Nazca plate subduction and hence influencing the transmission of tectonic forces into South America.
4. Climate also determined the formation of internal drainage (endorheism) and sediment trapping within the Andes, potentially blocking tectonic deformation in the area between the two cordilleras.

==== Quaternary ====
The Quaternary glaciations left visible marks in most parts of Chile, particularly Zona Sur and Zona Austral. These include ice fields, fjords, glacial lakes and u-shaped valleys. During the Santa María glaciation glaciers extended into the Pacific Ocean at 42° south, dividing the Chilean Coast Range and creating what is now Chacao Channel. Chiloé, part of the Chilean Coast Range, became an island. South of Chacao Channel, Chile's coast is split by fjords, islands and channels; these glaciers created moraines at the edges of the Patagonian lakes, changing their outlets to the Pacific and shifting the continental divide. The remnants of the Patagonian Ice Sheet which covered large parts of Chile and Argentina are the Northern and the Southern Patagonian Ice Fields.

It has been suggested that from 1675 to 1850 the San Rafael Glacier advanced during the Little Ice Age. The first documented visit to the area was made in 1675 by the Spanish explorer Antonio de Vea, who entered San Rafael Lagoon through Río Témpanos ("Ice Floe River") without mentioning the many ice floes for which the river is named. De Vea also wrote that the San Rafael Glacier did not reach far into the lagoon. In 1766 another expedition noticed that the glacier did reach the lagoon and had calved into icebergs. Hans Steffen visited the area in 1898, noting that the glacier now penetrated far into the lagoon. As of 2001, the glacier has retreated behind its 1675 border due to climate change.

== Pacific islands ==
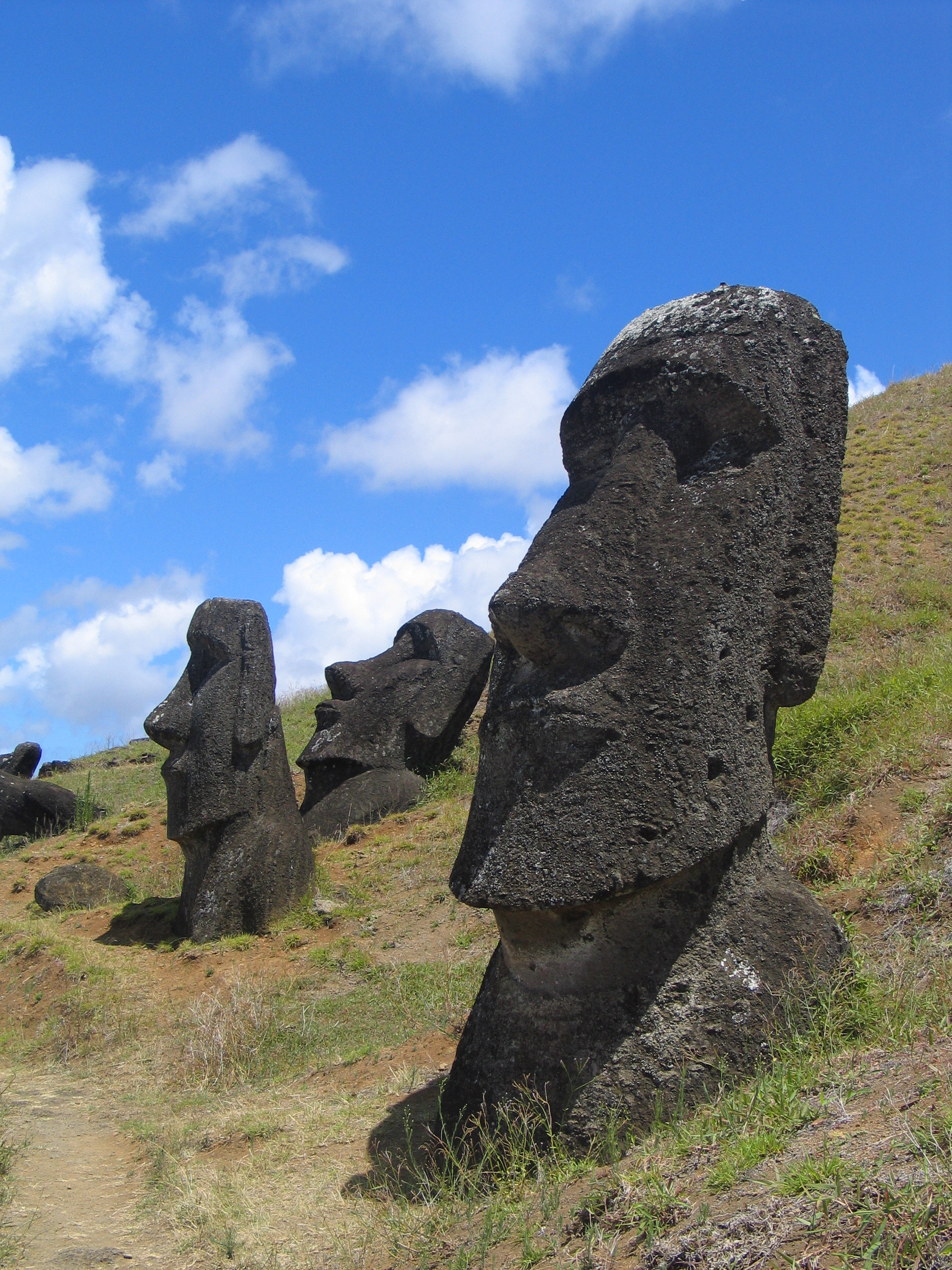
Most of the moai on Easter island are carved from volcanic tuff.

Easter Island is a volcanic island consisting of three extinct volcanoes: Terevaka, at an altitude of 507 metres (1,663 ft), forms the bulk of the island. Two other volcanoes (Poike and Rano Kau) form the eastern and southern headlands, giving the island its triangular shape. There are numerous lesser cones and other volcanic features: the crater Rano Raraku, the cinder cone Puna Pau and many volcanic caves (including lava tubes).

Easter Island and its surrounding islets, including Motu Nui and Motu Iti, form the comminuted apex of a large volcanic mountain rising over 2,000 metres (6,600 ft) from the seabed. It is part of the Sala y Gómez Ridge, a mostly-submarine mountain range with dozens of seamounts. Pukao and Moai are two seamounts west of Easter Island, extending 2,700 km (1,700 mi) east to the Nazca Seamount. Pukao, Moai and Easter Island were formed during the last 750,000 years, with the last eruption a little over 100,000 years ago. These are the youngest mountains of the Sala y Gómez Ridge, which was formed by the Nazca plate floating over the Easter hotspot. Only on Easter Island is the Sala y Gómez Ridge dry land.

The volcanic Juan Fernández Islands were created by a hotspot in the Earth's mantle penetrating the Nazca plate. The islands were carried eastward as the plate subducted the South American continent. Radiometric dating indicates that Santa Clara is the oldest of the islands (at 5.8 million years), followed by Robinson Crusoe (3.8–4.2 million years) and Alexander Selkirk (1.0–2.4 million years). Robinson Crusoe is the largest of the islands at 93 square kilometres (36 sq mi), and its highest peak (El Yunque) is 916 metres (3,005 ft) high. Alexander Selkirk covers 50 square kilometres (19 sq mi), and its highest peak is Los Innocentes at 1,319 metres (4,327 ft). Santa Clara covers 2.2 square kilometres (540 acres), reaching an elevation of 350 metres (1,150 ft).

== Economic geology ==
=== Mining ===
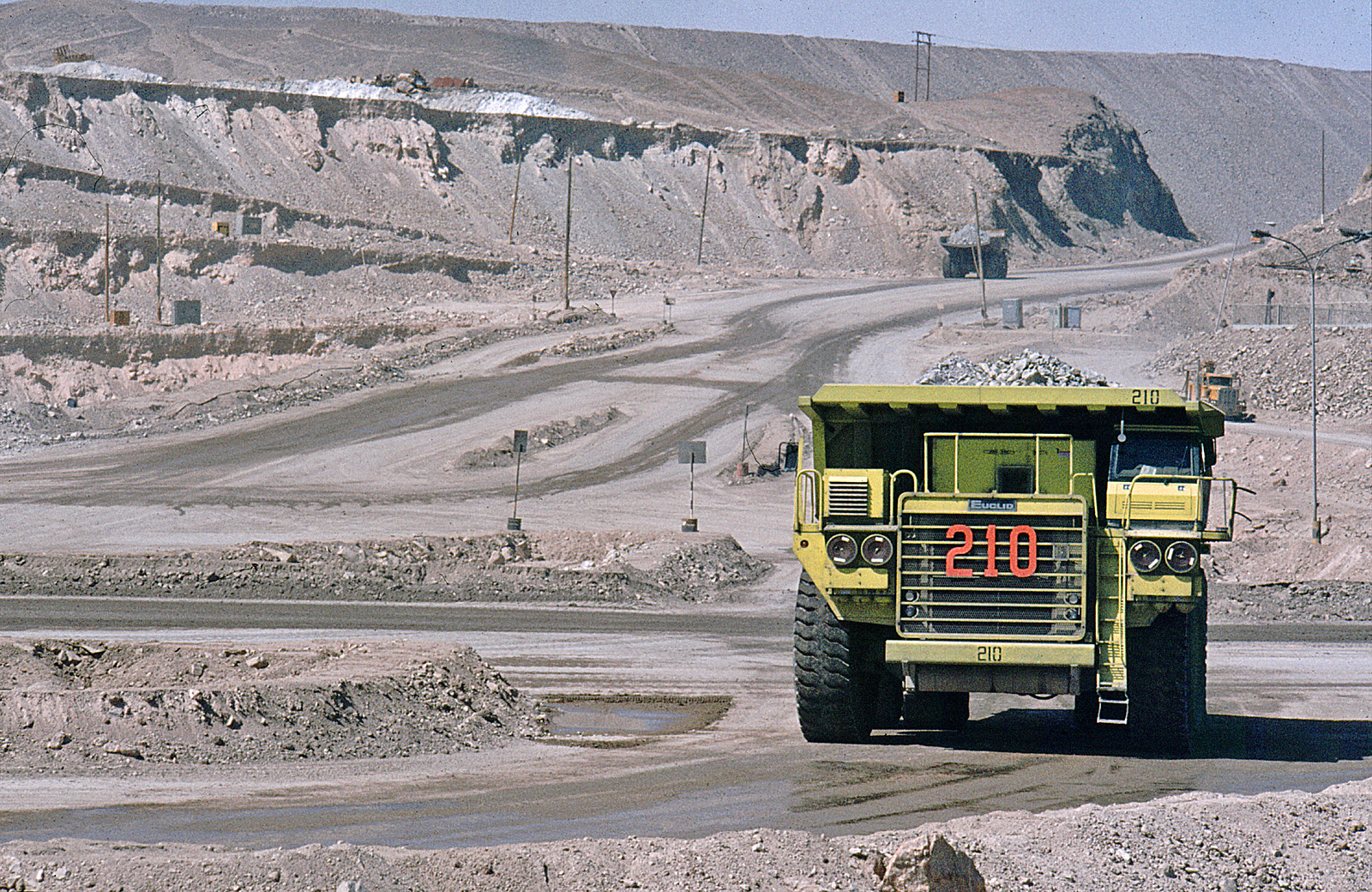
Chuquicamata copper mine in 1984

Chile has the world's largest copper reserves, and is the largest producer and exporter of the metal. Notable copper mines include Chuquicamata and Escondida. Chile accounts for five percent of the Western Hemisphere's gold production, of which 41 percent is a by-product of copper extraction. The country holds the largest world reserves of rhenium and potassium nitrate, and its reserves of molybdenum are estimated to be the third-largest in the world. Most of Chile's mineral resources are in the north; gas, coal and oil reserves, in the southern Magallanes Region, are sufficient for local needs. Guarello Island, in the Magallanes Region, has the world's southernmost limestone mine.

=== Geothermal energy ===
Since 2000, geothermal exploration and concessions have been regulated by the Law of Geothermal Concessions (Spanish: Ley de Concesiones de Energía Geotérmica). The Chilean company Geotermia del Pacífico, with support from CORFO, is exploring a location in Curacautín as a site for a geothermal power plant. Geotermia del Pacífico's studies indicated that two geothermal fields near Curacautín could be used for energy production, with a combined capacity to supply 36,000 homes in 2010. One area to be developed is located near the Tolhuaca hot springs, and the other is in Río Blanco Springs. Another area under consideration for geothermal production is Cordón Caulle.

=== Tourism ===
Although geology-focused tourism is rare, there are some sites in which the local geology is a major attraction (for example, the copper mine at Chuquicamata).

== Geological hazards ==
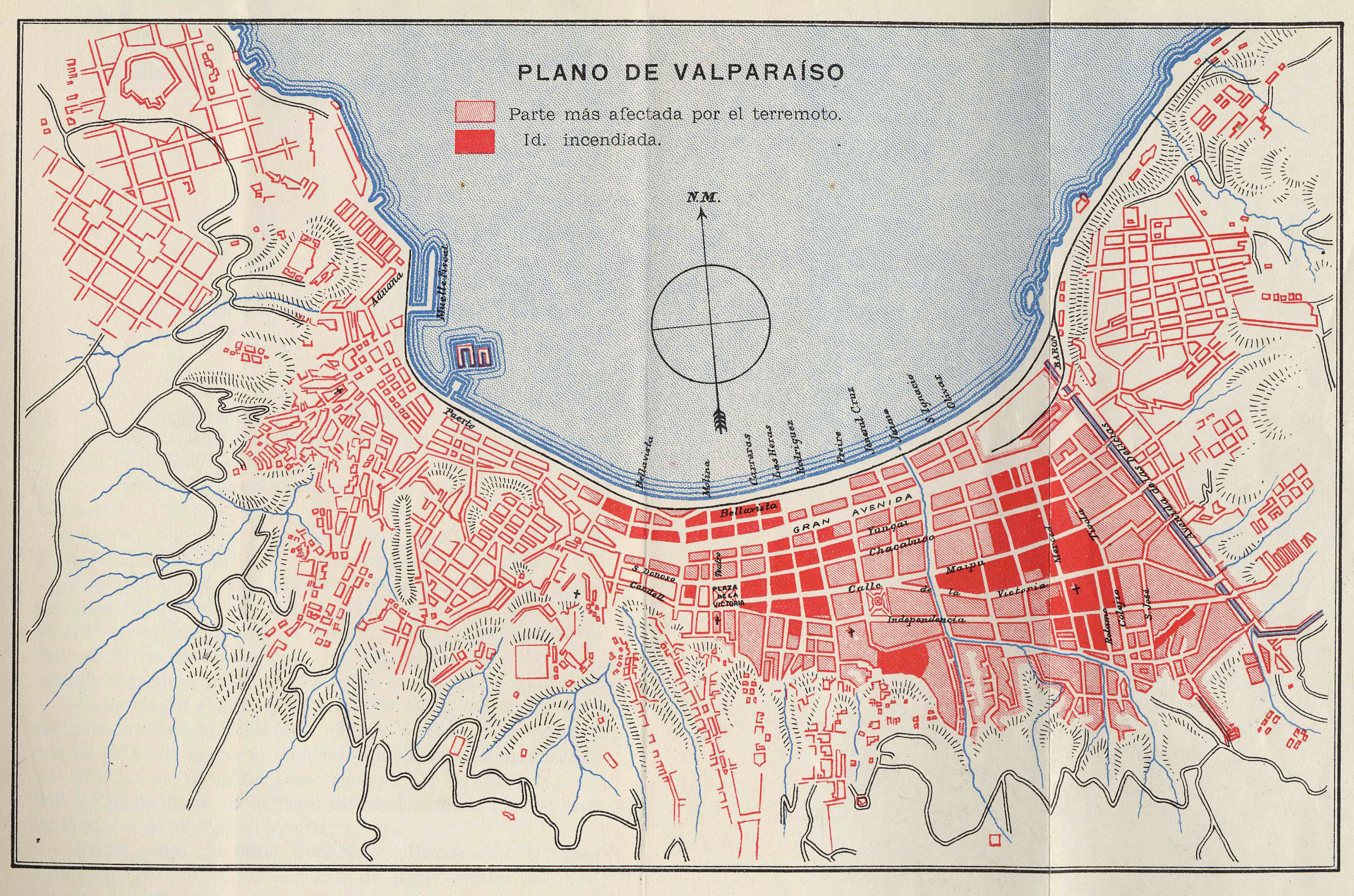
Map of Valparaíso after the earthquake of 16 August 1906 Area of the city most affected by earthquake City blocks most damaged by fire

Earthquakes, volcanic eruptions and mass ground movements are frequent occurrences. The subduction zone along Chile's coast has produced the most powerful earthquake ever recorded, the 1960 Valdivia earthquake. Earthquakes are notorious for triggering volcanic eruptions, such as the 1960 Cordón Caulle eruption. Chilean earthquakes have produced tsunamis.

Landslides occur frequently in the Andes, most following earthquakes. The 2007 Aysén Fjord earthquakes produced several landslides along the Fjords Mountains, spawning a tsunami. Lahars are among the most lethal volcanic hazards in Chile; a lahar destroyed the original site of Coñaripe.

=== Earthquakes ===
Major earthquakes in Chile occur in a small number of source areas. Those affecting coastal regions are generally aligned offshore from Concepción southward, with the major epicenters producing a predictable pattern of seismic and tsunami effects. The first systematic seismological recordings in Chile began after an earthquake and fire devastated Valparaiso in 1906.

Earthquakes in northern Chile are known to have caused both uplift and subsidence of the continent. Large earthquakes of Magnitude 8 or more are associated with subsidence and drowning of the Chilean coast, except peninsulas and offshore islands. Magnitude 7 to 8 earthquakes with a source area near an internal boundary of the Earth known as the Moho are known to result in uplift of the coast. Earthquakes near the Moho may account for permanent deformation of the western edge of South American plate that accumulates into a long-term net uplift of the continent.

=== Quake clusters ===
Although the most powerful six quakes recorded were clustered in two time periods (a 12-year span from 1952 to 1964 and a seven-year span from 2004 to 2011), this is considered a statistical anomaly. The phenomenon of comparably-large quakes on the same (or neighboring) faults within months of each other may be explained by geological mechanisms, but this does not fully demonstrate a relationship between events separated by longer periods and greater distances

== See also ==
- Climate of Chile
- Geography of Chile
- List of glaciers of Chile
- List of volcanoes in Chile
