= Nef Glacier =

Glacier in Chile

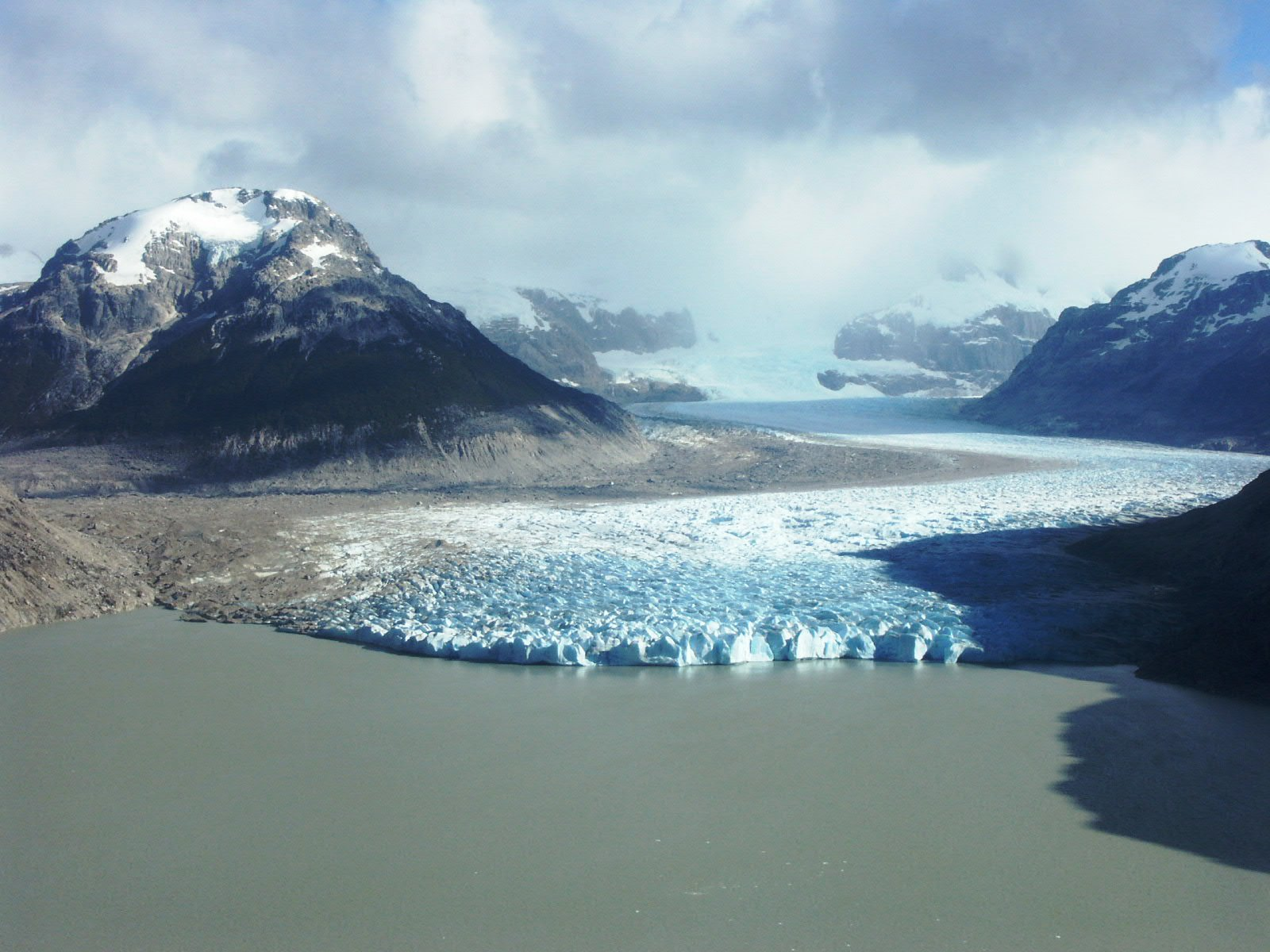
- Interactive map of Nef Glacier
- Type: Mountain glacier
- Location: Chile
- Coordinates: 47°03′S 73°16′W
- Area: 164 km^{2} (63 sq mi)
- Terminus: Proglacial lake

Nef Glacier is a glacier located in Laguna San Rafael National Park, in the Aysén del General Carlos Ibáñez del Campo Region of Chile. It trends southeast from Cerro Largo to its terminus in the lake that shared its name.

It is the fifth largest glacier in the Northern Patagonian Ice Field, after San Quintín, San Rafael, Steffen and Colonia.

== See also ==
- Glaciers of Chile
