= Exploradores Glacier =

Glacier in Chile

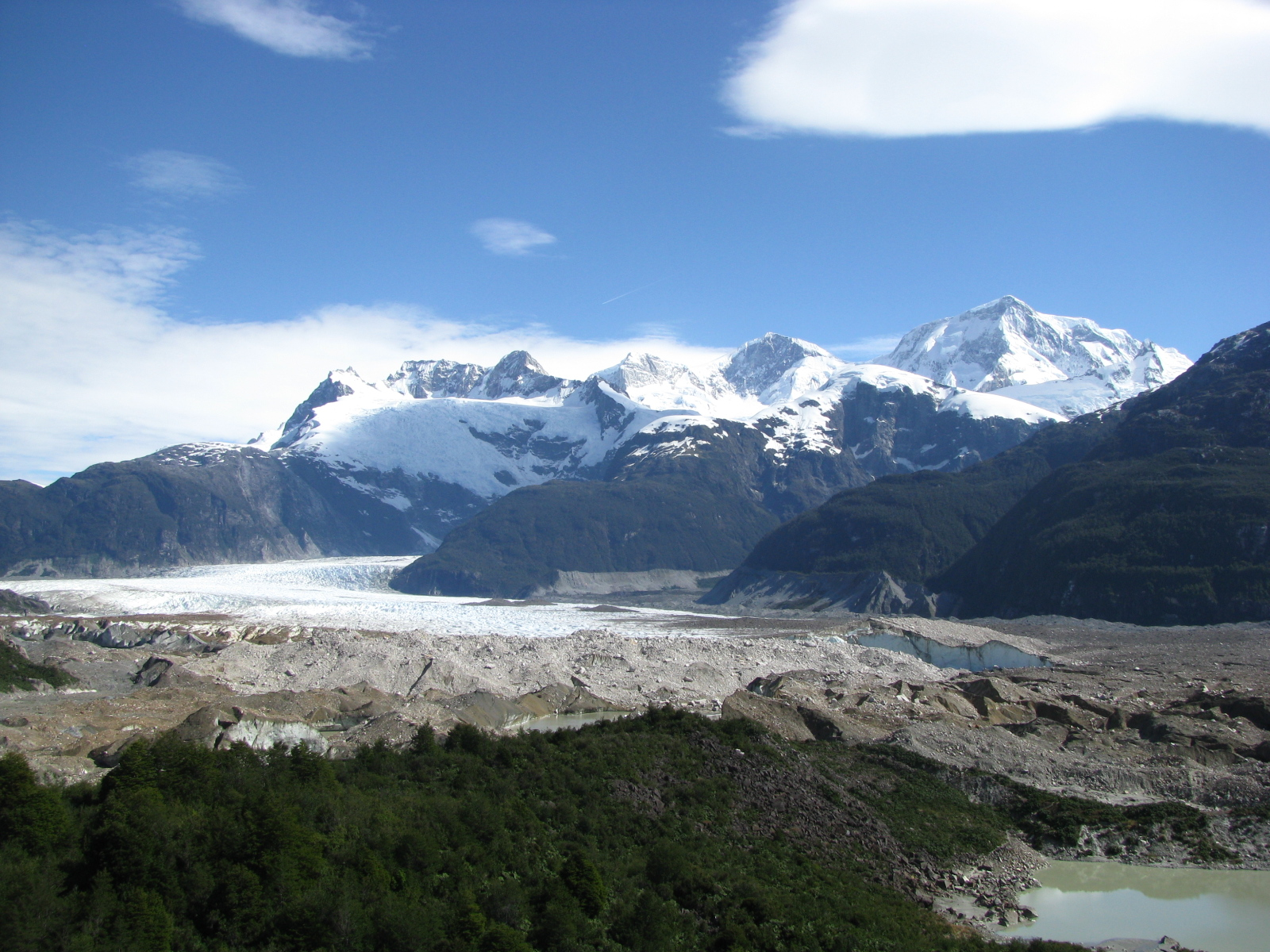
- Monte San Valentín and other summits of the Northern Patagonian Ice Field are visible in the distance.
- Interactive map of Exploradores Glacier
- Location: Chile
- Coordinates: 46°30′S 73°10′W
- Area: 95 km^{2} (37 sq mi)
- Length: 20.3 km (12.6 mi)
- Terminus: moraines

The Exploradores Glacier is a glacier situated on the northeastern slope of Monte San Valentín, in the Aysén del General Carlos Ibáñez del Campo Region of Chile. The locality nearest to the glacier is Puerto Río Tranquilo, which is located on the western shore of General Carrera Lake.

The glacier is part of Laguna San Rafael National Park.

On October 31, 2023, Chile's National Forest Corporation announced, after a two-week study by government hydrologists, that the glacier had "evident risks" and stated that "conditions are not safe for ecotourism activities." This decision, which came after a huge chunk of the glacier fell on October 6, surprised local guides and adventurers, who called it an emotional and economic blow, and disagreed with permanently closing the hiking routes. After evaluation, glacier trekking was reopened in February 2, 2024, following a new route and with increased requirements for visitors and guides.
