= Cerro Pared Norte =

Mountain in Chile

Pared Norte
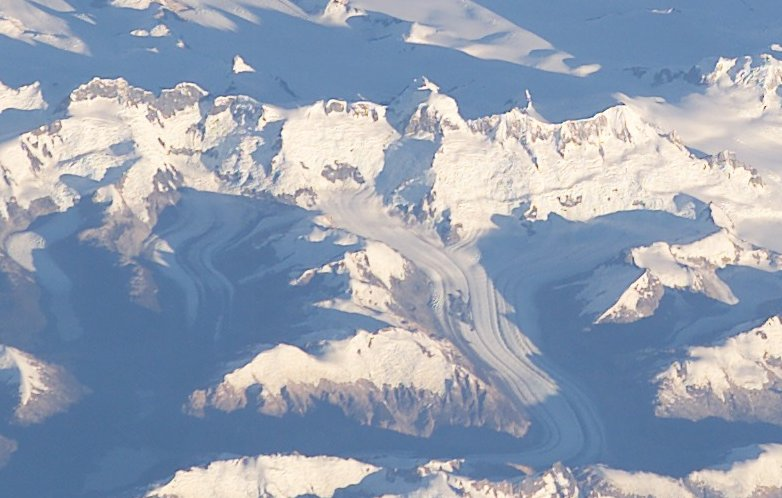
- East Face of Pared Norte.

Highest point
- Elevation: 3,005 m (9,859 ft)
- Coordinates: 47°22′S 73°26′W

Geography
- Location: Chile
- Parent range: Andes

Cerro Pared Norte is a mountain located in the Aysén del General Carlos Ibáñez del Campo Region of Chile. It lies on the Northern Patagonian Ice Field, at the center of a mountain ridge with steep slopes and sheer cliffs, at whose southern and northern tips lie, respectively, Cerro Pared Sur (2,548 m) and an unnamed summit. A glacier named after the mountain originates from their eastern slopes. "Pared Norte" (Spanish for "North Wall") gets its name from its shape and location.

The mountain and the surrounding area form part of Laguna San Rafael National Park.
