= Tapado Glacier =

Glacier in Chile

Tapado
- Location within Chile
- Location: Chile
- Coordinates: 30°08′S 69°55′W
- Area: 3.6 km^{2} (0 sq mi)

The Tapado Glacier is a glacier in Chile

== See also ==
- List of glaciers of Chile
