= Cachet Fault =

Cachet Fault is a dextral strike-slip fault in Aysén Region, Chile. The fault runs in north–south direction right to the east of the Northern Patagonian Ice Field. Various west-east glacial valleys have been displaced the movement of the fault. The existence of the fault and its movement has been linked to the Chile triple junction and the oblique subduction of Nazca plate. The fault exhibits present-day seismicity. Together, Exploradores Fault Zone and Liquiñe-Ofqui Fault Zone and Cachet Fault makes up the boundaries of a crustal block that has been uplifted hosting at present the Northern Patagonian Ice Field.
