= Steffen Glacier =

Glacier in Chile

- Interactive map of Steffen Glacier
- Type: Outlet glacier
- Location: Chile
- Coordinates: 47°29′26″S 73°43′15″W

Steffen Glacier is a major outlet glacier of the Northern Patagonian Ice Field in Aysén del General Carlos Ibáñez del Campo Region of Chile. It is the southernmost outlet glacier of the Northern Patagonian Ice Field and ends up in a lagoon from where Huemules River is born. The glacier is named after Hans Steffen a German geographer who explored Aysén del General Carlos Ibáñez del Campo Region on behalf of the Chilean government before the General Treaty of Arbitration between Chile and the Argentine Republic of 1902.

== See also ==
- Katalalixar National Reserve
- Cerro Arenales
- List of glaciers
