= Katalalixar National Reserve =

Natural reserve in Chile

- IUCN category IV (habitat/species management area)
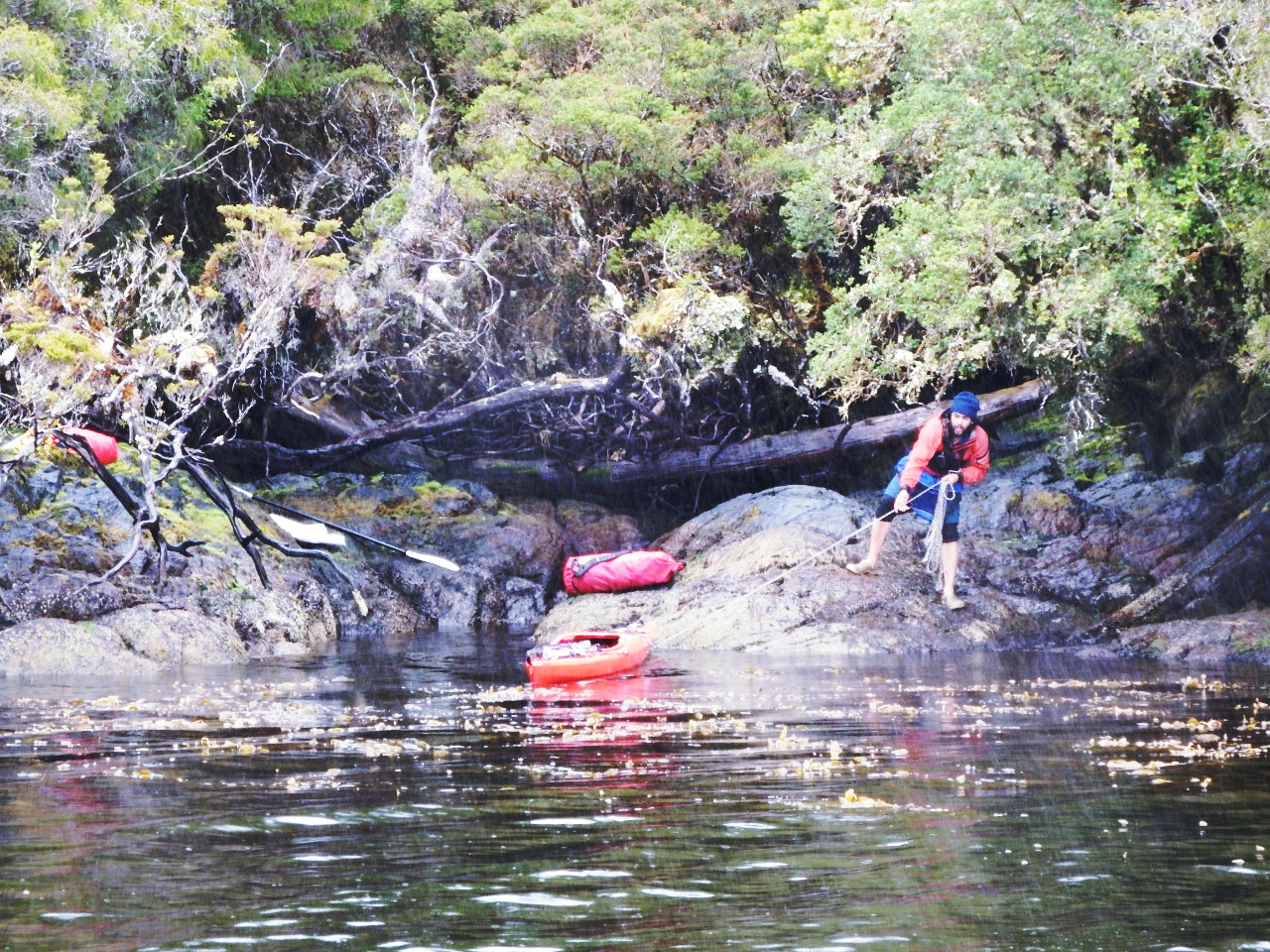
- Canoe exploration of the Katalalixar Reserve

- Location within Chile
- Location: Aysén del General Carlos Ibáñez del Campo Region, Chile
- Coordinates: 48.33°S 74.96°W
- Area: 6,245 km^{2} (2,411 sq mi)
- Established: 1983

Katalalixar National Reserve is a natural reserve located in an archipelago between Southern Patagonian Ice Field, and Northern Patagonian Ice Field in Aysén del General Carlos Ibáñez del Campo Region of Chile. The reserve was created in 1983 and has no infrastructure. It covers an area of 6,245 km^{2} (2,411 sq mi) within the Magellanic subpolar forests ecoregion and exhibits more biodiversity than other areas of southern Chile. This may appear contradictory, as the area is supposed to have been covered by the Patagonian Ice Sheet during the last glacial maximum.
