= Cerro Arenales =

Mountain in Chile

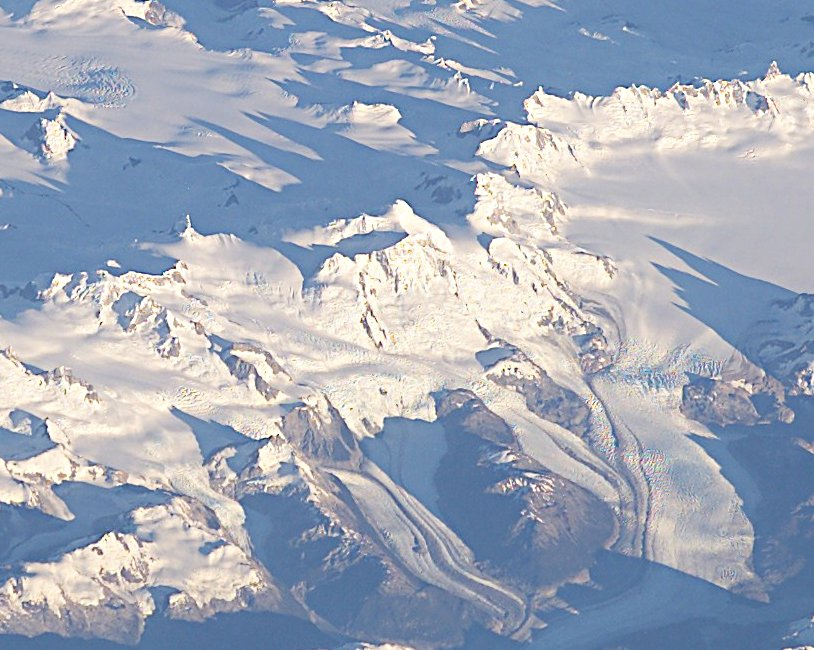
- The pyramidal Cerro Arenales can be seen in the center of this NASA image.

Highest point
- Elevation: 3,437 m (11,276 ft)
- Prominence: 1,900 m (6,200 ft)
- Listing: Ultra
- Coordinates: 47°11′45″S 73°28′06″W

Geography
- Location within Chile
- Location: Chile
- Parent range: Andes

Geology
- Mountain type: Stratovolcano
- Volcanic zone: South Volcanic Zone
- Last eruption: March 1979

Climbing
- First ascent: 1958 by Tanaka and party

Cerro Arenales is a heavily ice-covered mountain located in the Aysén del General Carlos Ibáñez del Campo Region of Chile, within Laguna San Rafael National Park. It towers over the southern part of the Northern Patagonian Ice Field. Arenales has a summit elevation of 3,437 meters (11276 feet) above sea level. Whether it is a volcano is controversial.

== Climbing ==
The first ascent of Cerro Arenales was made in 1958 by a Japanese-Chilean expedition, headed by Professor Tanaka. In December 1963 an expedition led by Eric Shipton, crossed the NPIF heading southeast from Laguna San Rafael to Río de la Colonia and accomplished on the way the second ascent.

== See also ==
- Monte San Valentín
- Baker River
- List of Ultras of South America
