= Las Guaitecas National Reserve =

Chilean protected area

- IUCN category IV (habitat/species management area)
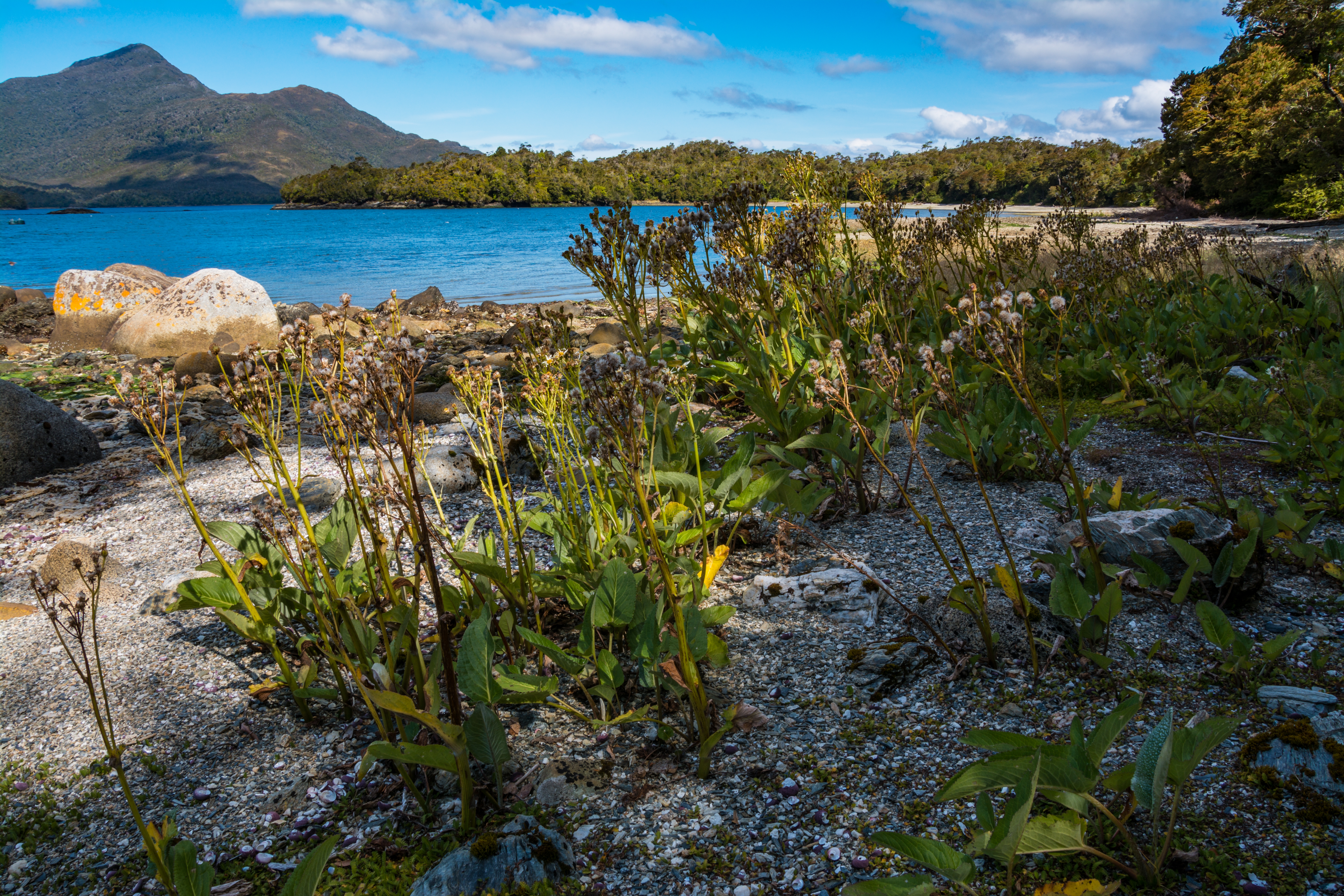
- Interactive map of Las Guaitecas National Reserve
- Location: Aysén del General Carlos Ibáñez del Campo Region, Chile
- Coordinates: 45.4899°S 74.3311°W
- Area: 10,979.75 km^{2} (4,239.31 sq mi)
- Designation: National reserve
- Designated: 1938
- Governing body: Corporación Nacional Forestal (CONAF)

Las Guaitecas National Reserve is a national reserve of southern Chile's Aysén del General Carlos Ibáñez del Campo Region.

It is one of the oldest protected green areas in the country. It covers an area of 1,097,975 hectares, including 40 islands and islets. The predominant vegetation is evergreen forest, in which three vegetational associations can be distinguished: evergreen forest with Chonos peat bogs, oceanic evergreen thickets, and Messier Channel evergreen swampy peat bogs and thickets.
