= Colonia Glacier =

Valley glacier in the Northern Patagonian Ice Field, Chile

Colonia Glacier (Ventisquero Colonia)
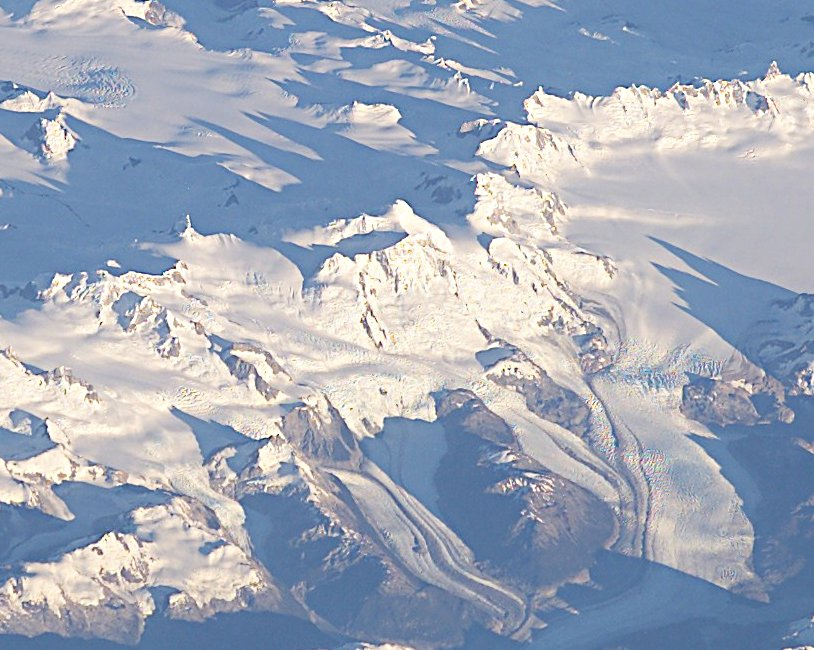
- Colonia Glacier is visible in the lower right corner.
- Interactive map of Colonia Glacier (Ventisquero Colonia)
- Type: Valley glacier
- Location: Chile
- Coordinates: 47°11′28″S 73°18′03″W
- Area: 437 km^{2} (169 sq mi)

Colonia Glacier (Spanish: Glaciar Colonia or Ventisquero Colonia) is a valley glacier located in the Northern Patagonian Ice Field, Chile. The glacier spills out to the southeast from an ice plateau north of Cerro Arenales and has its terminus about 4 km (2.5 mi) from Colonia Lake. Colonia Glacier dams two lakes; Cachet II and Arco Lake. The ice dam containing the waters of Cachet II Lake fails regularly, which generates glacial lake outburst floods.

On March 31, 2012, for the second time that year, virtually all of the 200 million cubic meters of water in Lake Cachet II were lost in less than 24 hours as a result of perforations in the glacial wall, a consequence of rising temperatures driven by climate change. The lake has drained 11 times since 2008 and experts predict it will increase in frequency.
