= Laguna San Rafael National Park =

National park in Chile

- IUCN category II (national park)
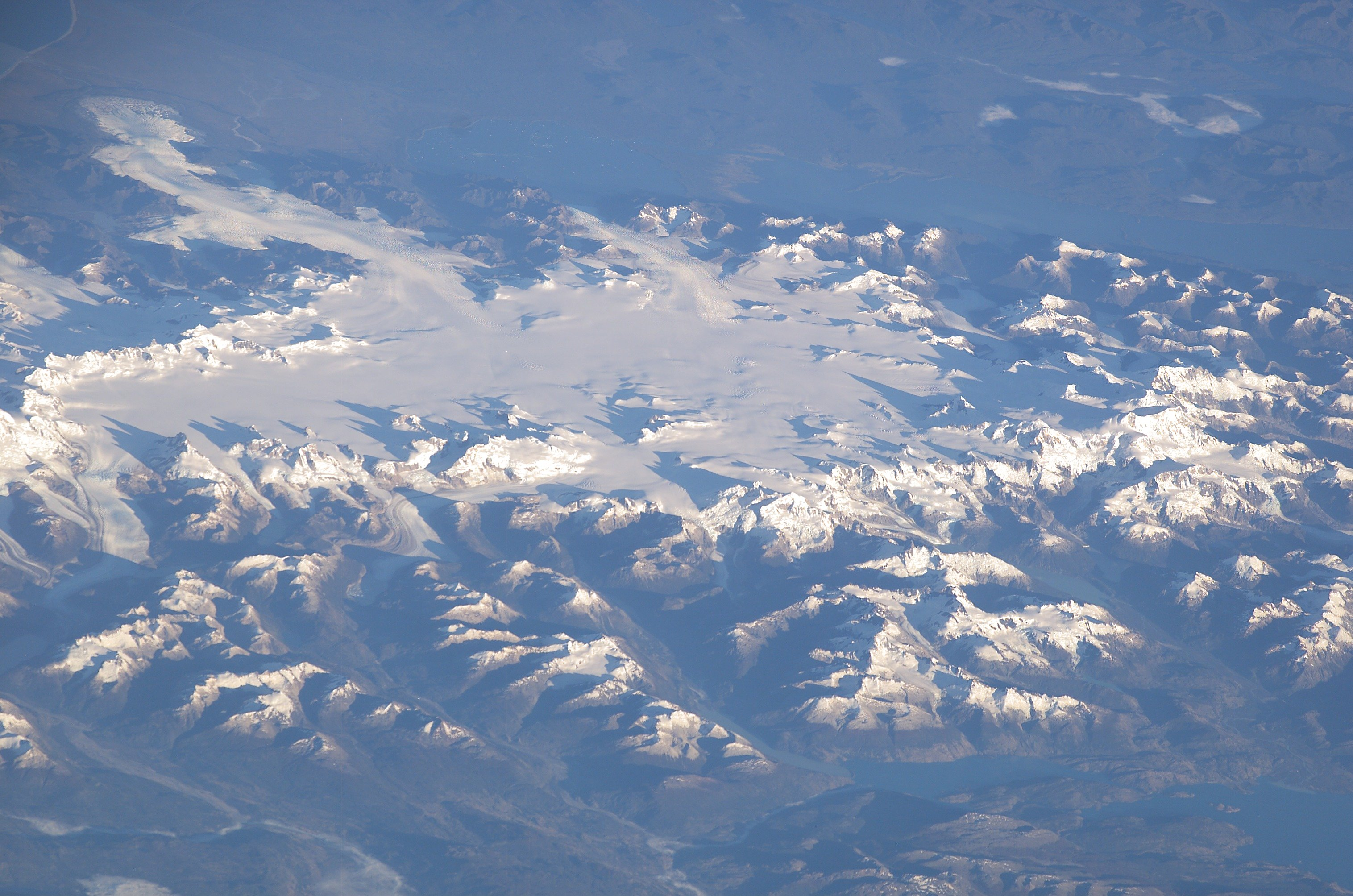
- Northern Patagonian Ice Field
- Interactive map of Laguna San Rafael National Park
- Location: Aysén del General Carlos Ibáñez del Campo Region, Chile
- Nearest city: Puerto Chacabuco
- Coordinates: 46°40′S 73°55′W
- Area: 17,420 km^{2} (6,726 sq mi)
- Established: 1959
- Governing body: Corporación Nacional Forestal

Laguna San Rafael National Park (Spanish pronunciation: [laˈɣuna san rafaˈel]) is a park located on the Pacific coast of southern Chile. The park is named for the San Rafael Lagoon formed by the retreat of the San Rafael Glacier. Created in 1959, it covers an area of 17,420 km^{2} (6,726 sq mi) and includes the Northern Patagonian Ice Field. A fjord more than 16 km (10 mi) long is one of the park's principal attractions.

== History ==
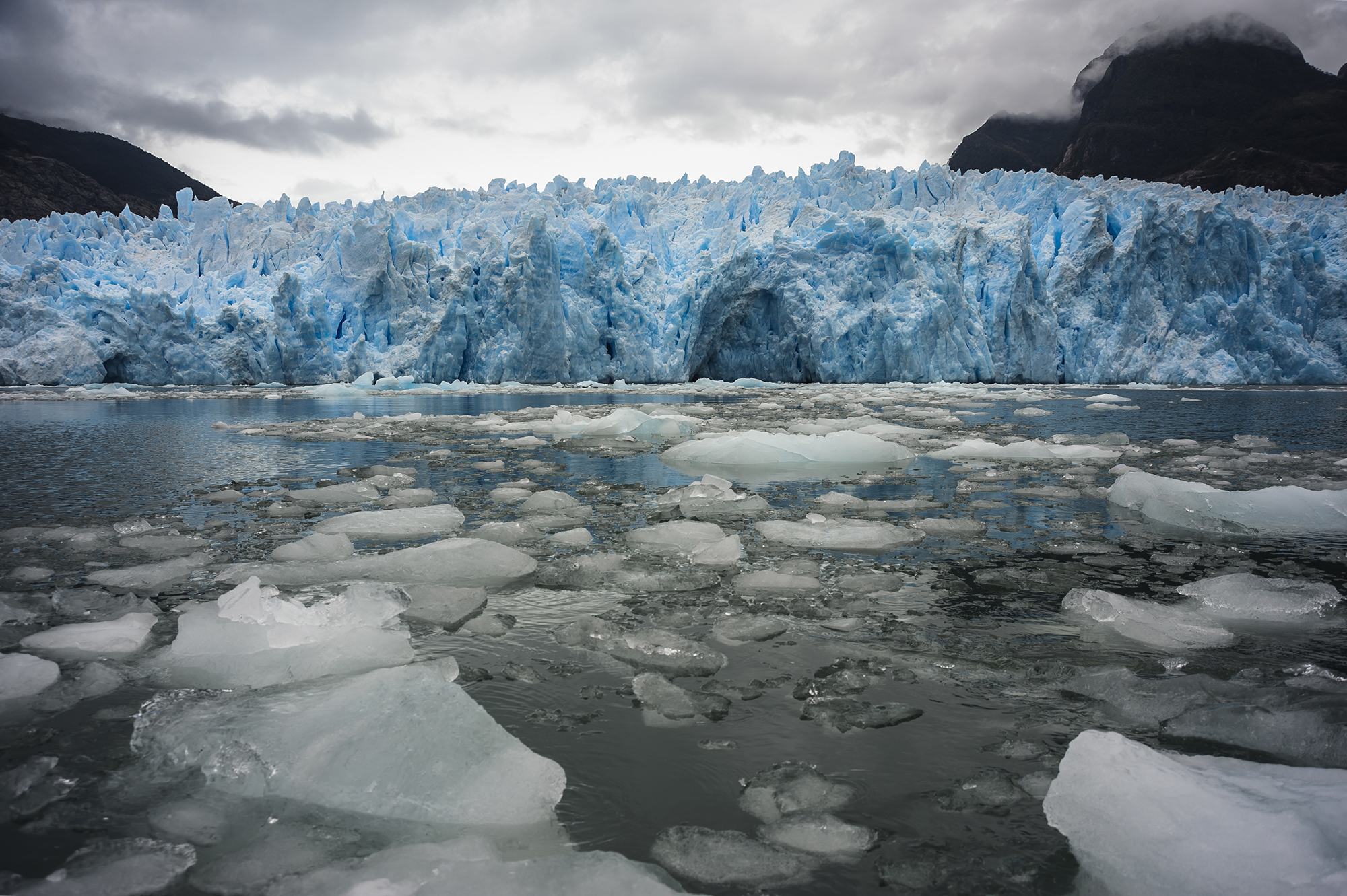
View of the glacier over the San Rafael Lake.

Non-indigenous people first explored the area of Laguna San Rafael in the year 1675. The glacier of the same name was a land-terminating glacier during that time. It probably reached again the lagoon at some time between 1741 and 1766, and it has been a tidewater glacier since that date.

The park was designated a World Biosphere Reserve by UNESCO in 1979.

== Geography ==
The park comprises some of the higher Andes mountains of Patagonia, such as the Monte San Valentín, Cerro Arenales, Cerro Hyades and Cerro Pared Norte.

This park contains a number of rivers. San Tadeo River is located in the Isthmus of Ofqui and flows into San Quintín Bay in the north part of the Gulf of Penas. Also there are various rivers bordering the park, such as the Baker River and the Exploradores River. Témpanos River (not really a river) connects San Rafael Lagoon with the Gulf Elefantes, the southern part of Moraleda Channel.

Presidente Ríos Lake spans the border between the park and Las Guaitecas National Reserve.

== Climate ==
San Rafael Glacier retreat (foreground) between 1990 and 2000.

Average annual rainfall at Cabo Raper (lat 46°50' S.), on the open coast of the Taitao Peninsula, is about 2,000 mm (79 in). Going eastward, the amount of precipitation increases in the sheltered areas of the Chilean Inside Passage, being similar to that of Los Lagos Region. The average annual precipitation recorded between 1981 and 1985 at Laguna San Rafael weather station (lat 46°37' S.) was 4,440 mm (175 in). At higher elevations, the precipitation increase is significant and is in the form of snow on the Northern Patagonian Ice Field, being recorded over 6,000 mm (240 in) of annual precipitation.

Climate data for Cabo Raper (1961-1990)
Month	Jan	Feb	Mar	Apr	May	Jun	Jul	Aug	Sep	Oct	Nov	Dec	Year
Mean daily maximum °C (°F)	14.3 (57.7)	14.0 (57.2)	13.6 (56.5)	12.5 (54.5)	11.1 (52.0)	10.0 (50.0)	9.4 (48.9)	8.9 (48.0)	9.6 (49.3)	10.5 (50.9)	11.5 (52.7)	12.9 (55.2)	11.5 (52.7)
Daily mean °C (°F)	11.5 (52.7)	11.4 (52.5)	11.0 (51.8)	10.1 (50.2)	8.9 (48.0)	7.3 (45.1)	6.7 (44.1)	6.6 (43.9)	7.2 (45.0)	8.0 (46.4)	9.3 (48.7)	10.3 (50.5)	9.0 (48.2)
Mean daily minimum °C (°F)	8.7 (47.7)	8.5 (47.3)	7.9 (46.2)	7.0 (44.6)	6.0 (42.8)	4.6 (40.3)	4.3 (39.7)	4.1 (39.4)	4.7 (40.5)	5.3 (41.5)	6.6 (43.9)	7.6 (45.7)	6.3 (43.3)
Average precipitation mm (inches)	149.1 (5.87)	132.0 (5.20)	149.4 (5.88)	155.5 (6.12)	162.7 (6.41)	158.0 (6.22)	166.0 (6.54)	147.8 (5.82)	121.5 (4.78)	136.2 (5.36)	146.6 (5.77)	142.2 (5.60)	1,767 (69.57)
Source: Meteorología Interactiva

== Biology ==
The park is a World Biosphere Reserve by UNESCO.

Several species of birds find shelter in the park, including black-browed albatrosses, great grebes, black-necked swans and cormorants.

Terrestrial and marine wildlife in this area also include South American gray fox, South Andean deer, Chilean dolphins, South American sea lions, marine otters, southern elephant seals, and so on. Baleen whales migrate into Gulf of Penas, and it is notable that the gulf is possibly a wintering/calving ground for the critically endangered population of Southern Right Whale.

== See also ==
- Torres del Paine National Park
- Los Glaciares National Park
