= Monte San Valentín =

Mountain in Chile

Monte San Valentin
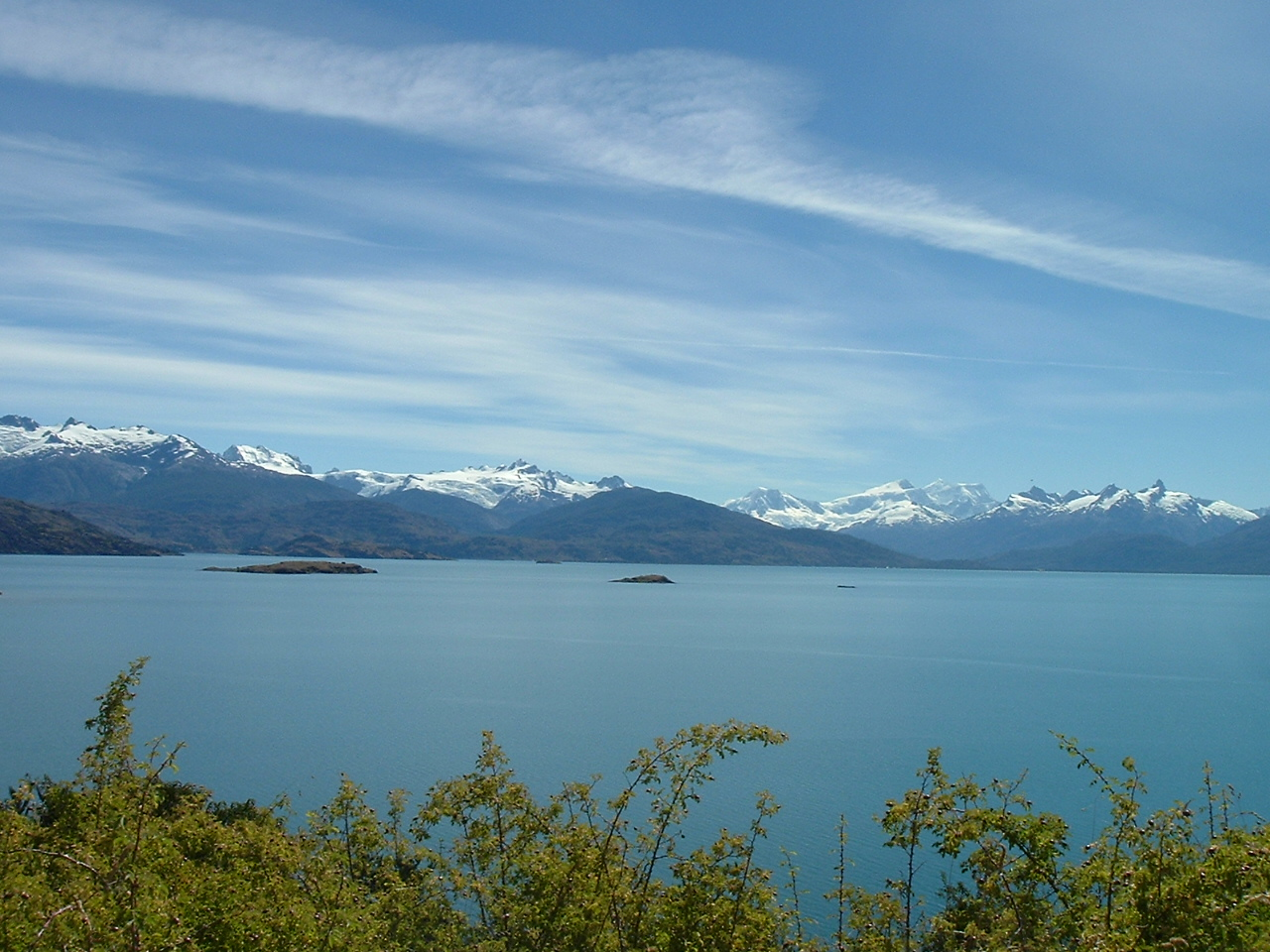
- San Valentin as seen from the shore of Lake General Carrera

Highest point
- Elevation: 4,058 m (13,314 ft)
- Prominence: 3,696 m (12,126 ft); Ranked 42nd
- Isolation: 1,130.16 km (702.25 mi)
- Listing: Ultra
- Coordinates: 46°35′42″S 73°20′45″W

Geography
- Location within Chile
- Location: Patagonia, Chile
- Parent range: Andes

Climbing
- Easiest route: major snow and ice climb

Monte San Valentin, also known as Monte San Clemente, is the highest mountain in Chilean Patagonia and the highest mountain south of 37°S outside Antarctica. It stands at the north end of the North Patagonian Icefield.

Monte San Valentin can be climbed from Lago Leones, to the south east, or from Laguna San Rafael, to the west. The ascent is long and is particularly subject to bad weather.

There is some confusion about the elevation. It was originally estimated at 3,876m by Nordenskjold in 1921 but later thought to be 4,058m. The latter is the most commonly quoted elevation and is quoted here. A French group that climbed the San Valentin in 1993 included two surveyors, who calculated an elevation of 4,080±20 m by using a GPS. In 2001 a Chilean group measured 4,070±40 m, also using GPS. SRTM and ASTER GDEM data also support an elevation in excess of 4,000 metres. However, Chilean IGM mapping gives only 3,910 metres. ChIGM maps are usually accurate and reliable, but the summit is uniformly white, which may have created problems for the cartographers.

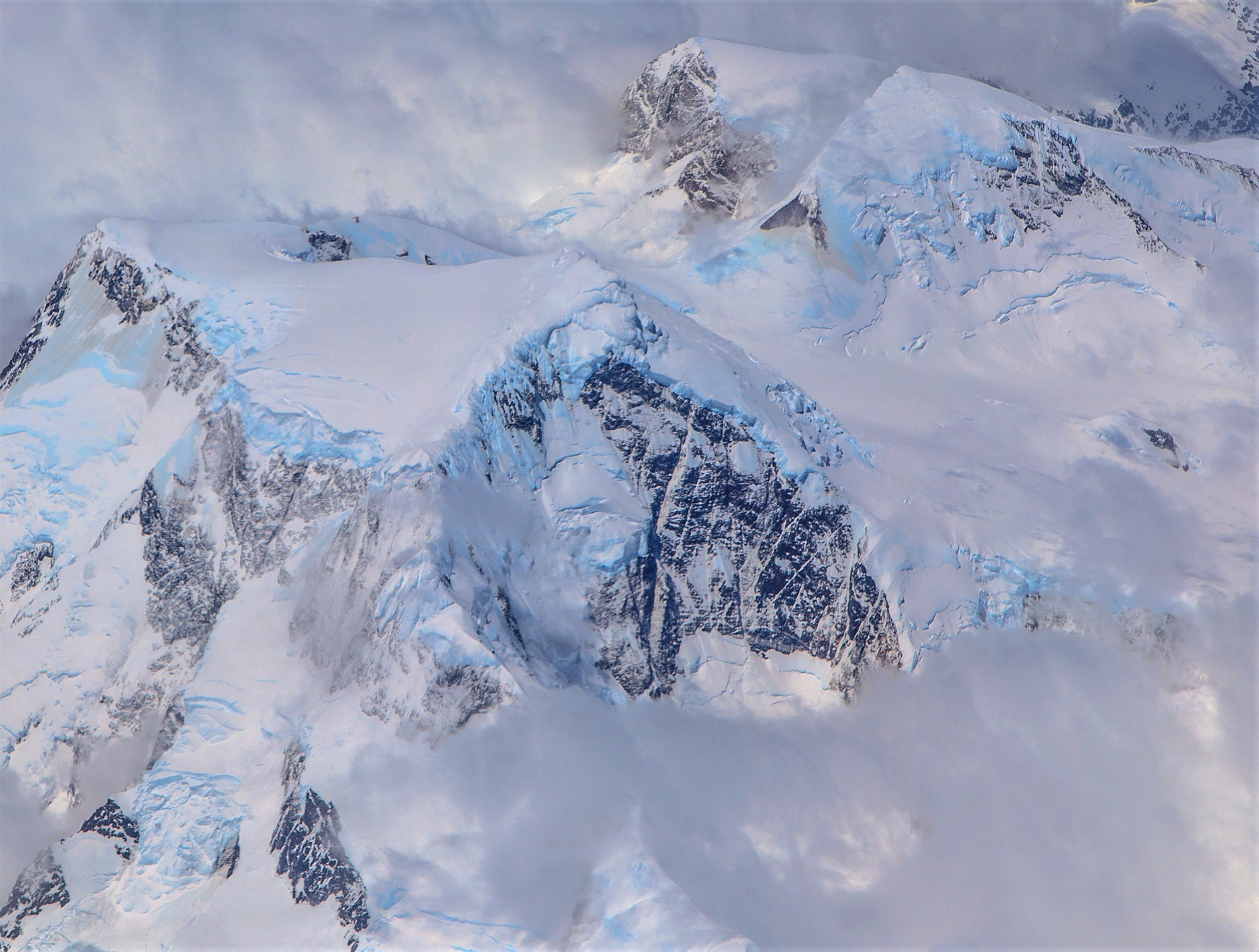
Aerial view, northwest aspect

== See also ==
- List of mountains in the Andes
- Laguna San Rafael National Park
- Mount Hudson
- Cerro Castillo
- Cerro Arenales
- List of Ultras of South America
