= San Quintín Glacier =

Glacier in Chile

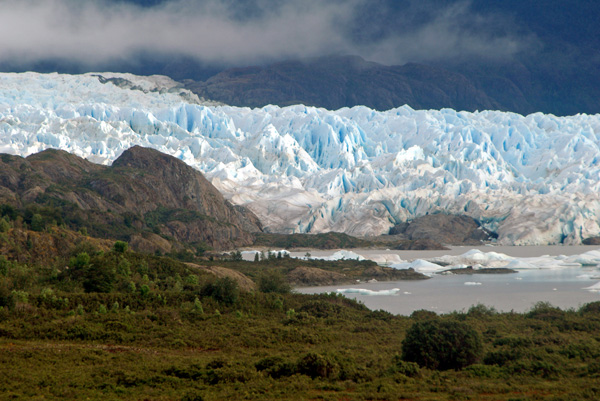
Main arm of San Quintin Glacier with its proglacial lake covering parts of Isthmus of Ofqui

The San Quintín Glacier is the largest outflow glacier of the Northern Patagonian Ice Field in southern Chile. Its terminus is a piedmont lobe just short of the Gulf of Penas on the Pacific Ocean and just north of 47°S.

== Recent retreat ==
Like many glaciers worldwide during the twentieth century, San Quintín appears to be losing mass and retreating rapidly.

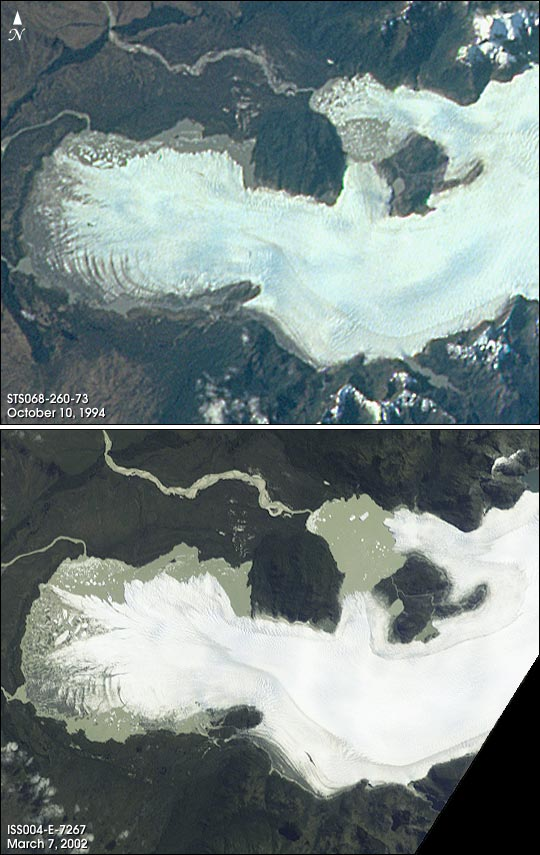
Retreating San Quintin Glacier

These two photographs taken by astronauts only seven years apart show visible change. The first was taken by the crew of STS-068 in October 1994 and the second by the Increment 4 crew of the International Space Station in February 2002.

San Rafael Glacier in the foreground and San Quintín Glacier behind, showing change over the interval circa 1990–2000. Both giant glaciers have been retreating rapidly in recent years (BBC story).

== See also ==
- List of glaciers
