= Holanda Glacier =

Glacier in Chile

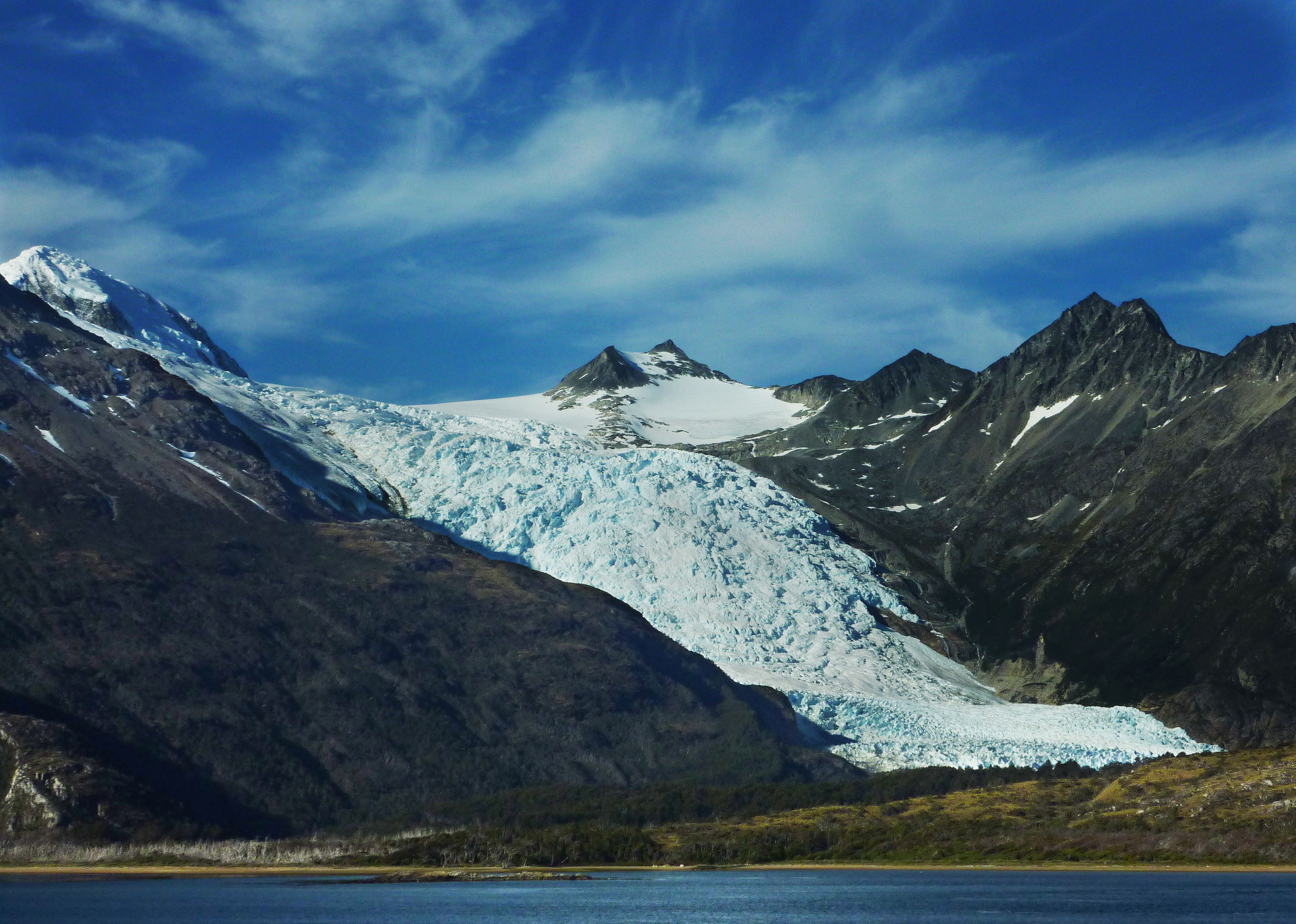
- Interactive map of Holanda Glacier
- Location: Chile
- Coordinates: 54°55′S 69°07′W

Holanda Glacier is a glacier located in Alberto de Agostini National Park, Chile. It is located at the east end of a group of glaciers line up on the north shore of the northwest arm of the Beagle Channel. The glacier terminus ends in a small proglacial lake.
