= Bernardo Glacier =

Glacier in Chile

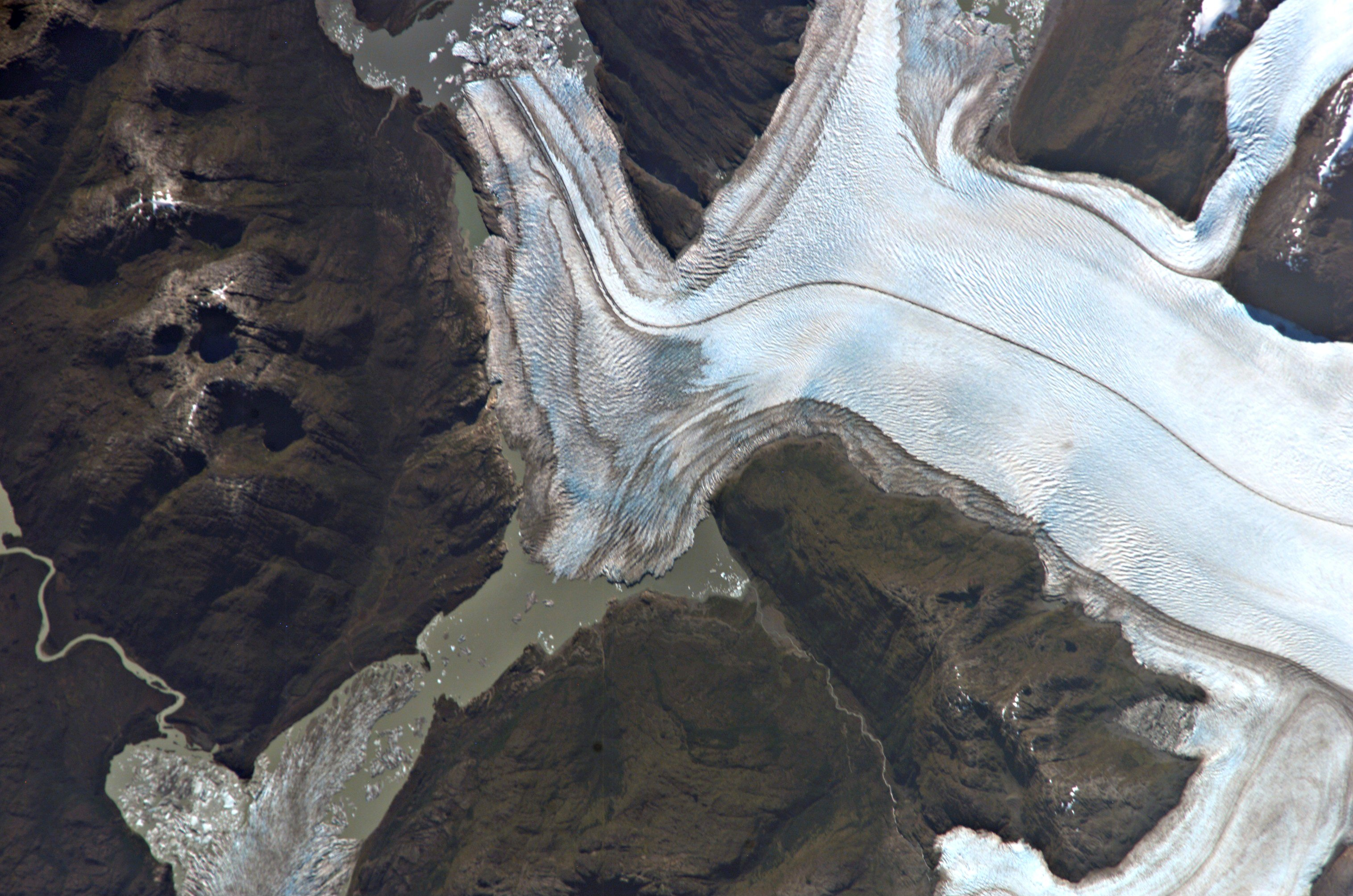
- In the lower-left corner of the image is visible a lake that recently disappeared.
- Interactive map of Bernardo Glacier
- Location: Chile
- Coordinates: 48°39′S 73°50′W
- Area: 536 km^{2} (207 sq mi)
- Length: 51 km (32 mi)
- Terminus: Glacial lake

Bernardo Glacier is one of the largest glaciers in the Southern Patagonian Ice Field. It is located northeast of Témpano Glacier, within Bernardo O'Higgins National Park in Chile. The glacier flows westward Bernardo Fjord.
