= Italia Glacier =

Glacier in Chile

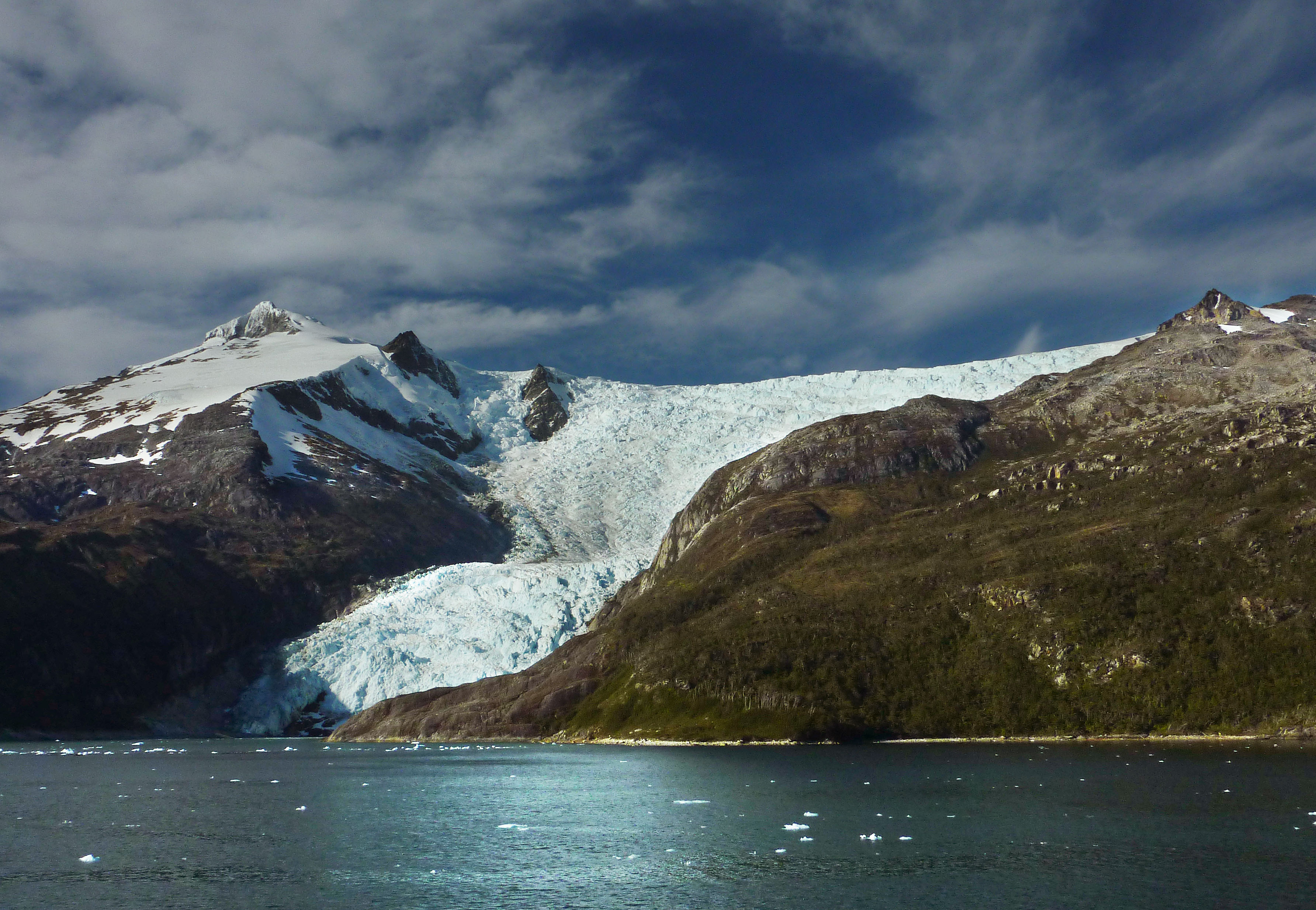
- Interactive map of Italia Glacier
- Location: Chile
- Coordinates: 54°54′S 69°14′W

Italia Glacier is a tidewater glacier located in Alberto de Agostini National Park, Chile. It flows down in a southwest direction to its terminus in the Beagle Channel.
