= Gran Campo Nevado =

Coordinates: 52°50′S 73°10′W

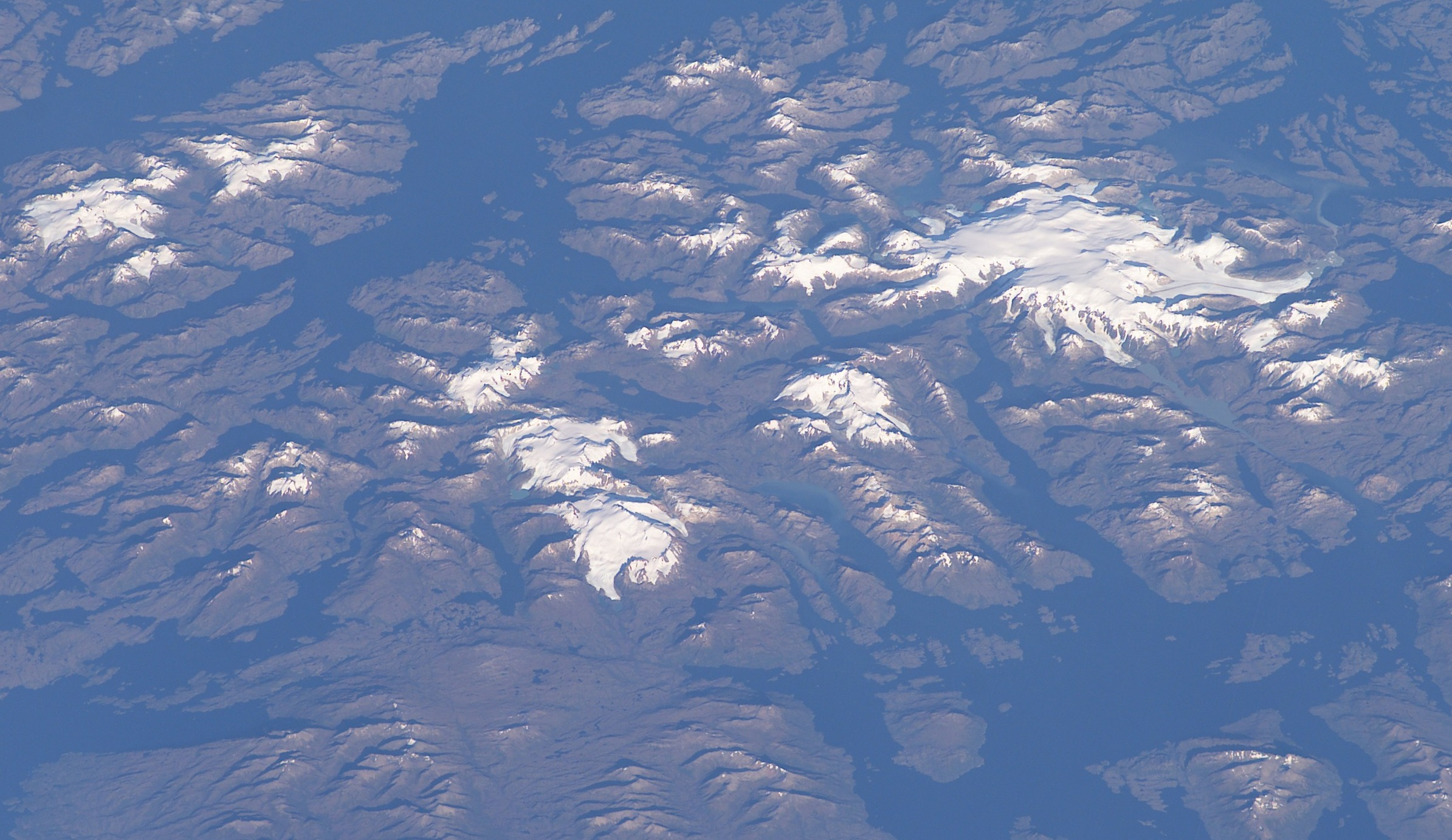
Gran Campo Nevado, glaciers, Canal Gajardo

The Gran Campo Nevado is a small ice field located in the southern portion of the Muñoz Gamero Peninsula, in Chile. It covers an area of approximately 200 km^{2} (77 sq mi) and feeds 19 outlet glaciers, the largest of which is 15 km (9.3 mi) long.

== See also ==
- Monte Burney
- Riesco Island
- Strait of Magellan
