= Dickson Glacier =

Glacier in Chile

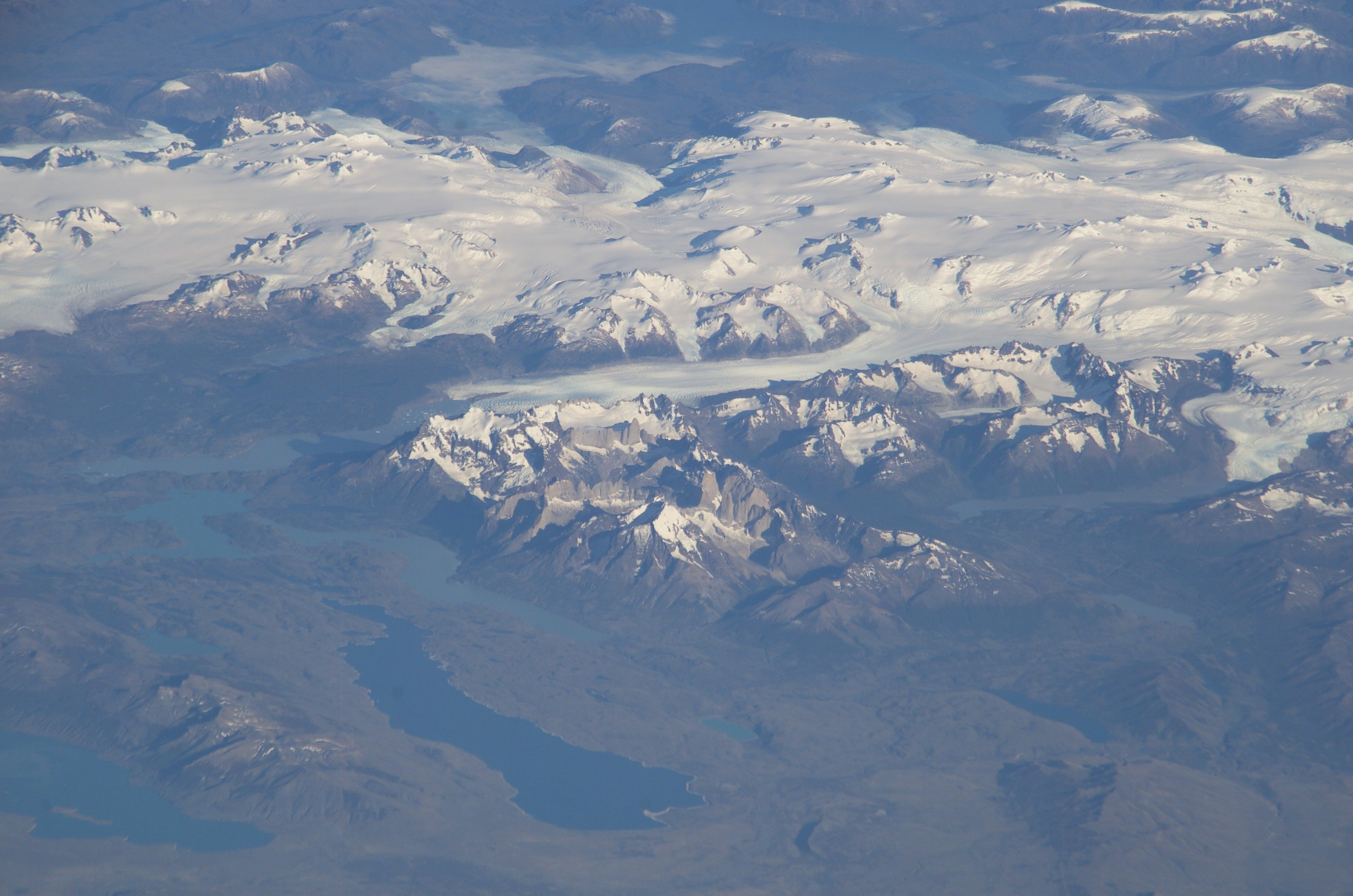
- The glacier is visible in the right-center of the image
- Interactive map of Dickson Glacier
- Location: Chile
- Coordinates: 50°47′S 73°09′W
- Area: 71 km^{2} (27 sq mi)
- Length: 10 km (6.2 mi)

Dickson Glacier is located in Torres del Paine National Park of southern Chile. Geologically it is in the southeastern outflow from the Southern Patagonian Ice Field. Named after Oscar Dickson by Otto Nordenskjöld in 1897.

== See also ==
- Grey Glacier
- Southern Patagonian Ice Field
- List of glaciers
