= La Paloma Glacier =

Glacier in Chile

- Type: Mountain glacier
- Location: Chile

La Paloma Glacier (Spanish: Glaciar La Paloma) is a glacier located some 30 km (19 mi) northeast of Santiago. It one of the largest glaciers of central Chile. It originates at 4,910 m (16,110 ft) AMSL and ends at 3,500 m (11,500 ft).
