= Patagonian Ice Sheet =

Former ice sheet in South America

Coordinates: 47.0000°S 73.0000°W

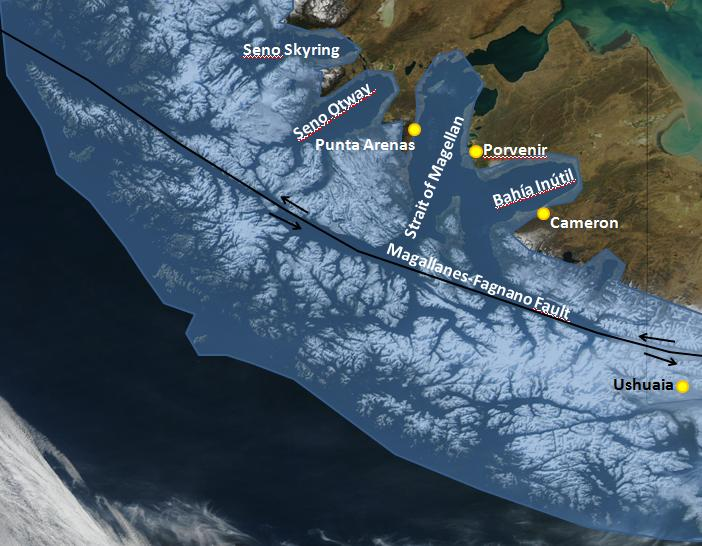
- Extent of the Patagonian Ice Sheet in the Strait of Magellan area during the last glacial period. Selected modern settlements are shown with yellow dots. Sea level was much lower than shown here.
- Interactive map of Patagonian Ice Sheet
- Type: continental
- Area: ∼504,500 km2 (±8.5%)
- Status: remnants: Northern Patagonian Ice Field, Southern Patagonian Ice Field

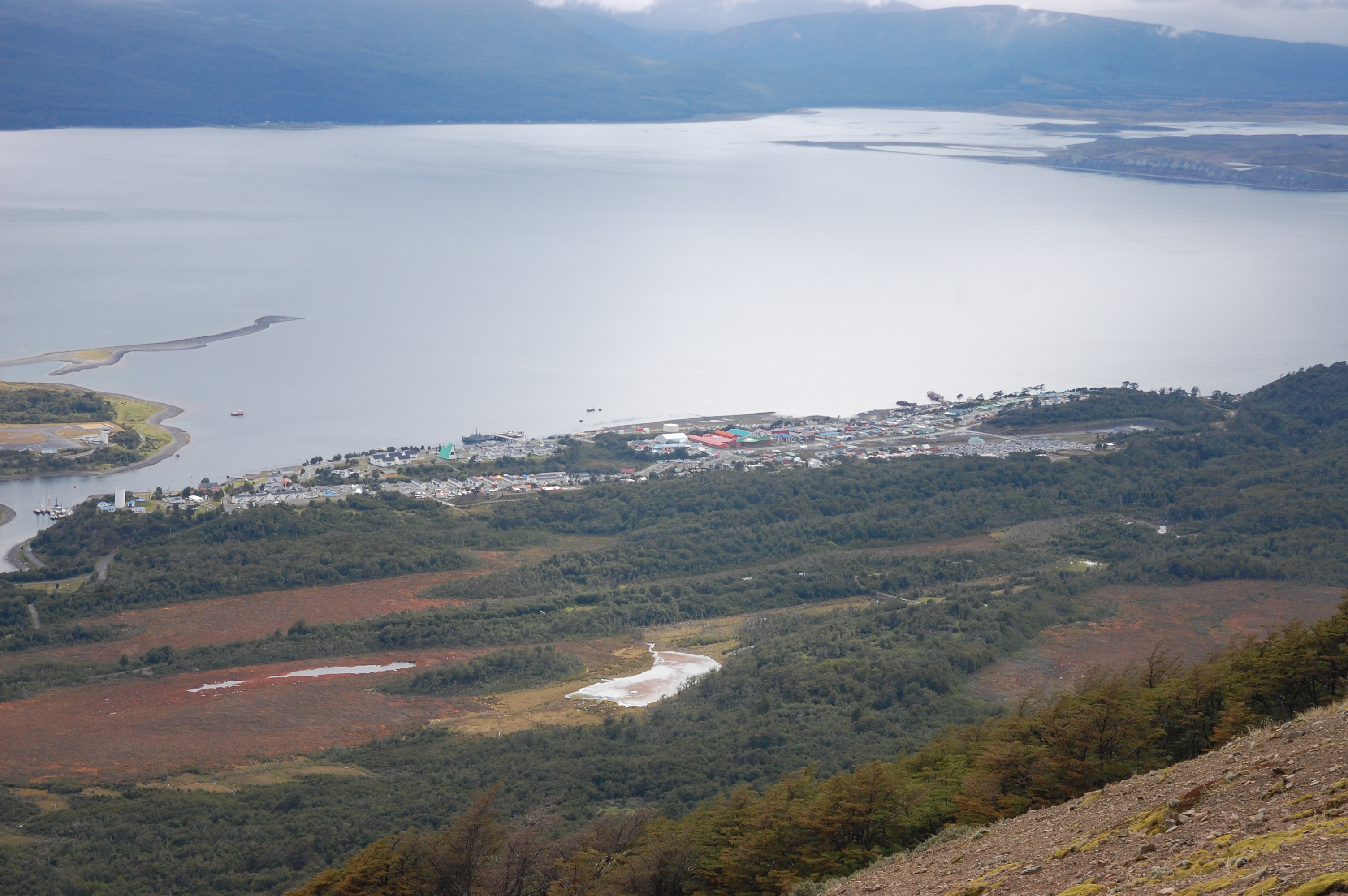
During the last ice age the Patagonian Ice Sheet created the elongated and forested drumlins seen south of Puerto Williams, Chile.

The Patagonian Ice Sheet was a large elongated and narrow ice sheet centered in the southern Andes that existed during the Llanquihue glaciation. The ice sheet covered all of Chile south of Puerto Montt plus the western fringes of Argentine Patagonia.

The ice sheet extended beyond the crest of the Andes into Argentina, but because of the dryness of the climate it did not reach beyond present-day lakes such as the Yagagtoo, Musters, and Colhue Huapi. At its peak (about 18,000 to 17,500 years ago), the Patagonian Ice Sheet covered about 480,000 km^{2} of land with an estimated ice-volume of more than 500,000 km^{3}, of which about 4% remains glaciated today in two separated portions known as the Northern and Southern Patagonian Ice Fields.

The ice-volume reduction contributed to a global sea level rise of about 1.2 meters. However, during the first glacial period at the beginning of the Pleistocene ice extended to the present-day Argentine coast. With each successive glaciation it is known that the ice has stopped further and further to the west, with aridity always serving as the decisive factor halting glacier spread: it is believed that the east-west precipitation gradients during glacial periods were even steeper than the extremely steep ones of present-day Patagonia.

Unlike the Laurentide ice sheet or the ice sheets of Northern Europe, the Patagonian Ice Sheet did not cause major extinctions or loss of biodiversity. This is because the flora remaining to the north of the ice were isolated by the Atacama Desert and were able to speciate easily wherever suitable microclimates occurred. In fact, most of the original Antarctic flora survives today on land occupied by the ice sheet. However, there are indications that during the last deglaciation (17,500 years ago), the rapid melting of the northernmost extension of the Patagonian Ice Sheet resulted in a dramatic release of freshwater to the adjacent ocean, decreasing its salinity and altering its circulation, resulting in significant ecological changes both locally and remotely.

== See also ==
- Ice sheet
- Northern Patagonian Ice Field
- Southern Patagonian Ice Field
- Katalalixar National Reserve
- Geography of Argentina
- Geography of Chile
