= San Rafael Lake =

Lake in Chile

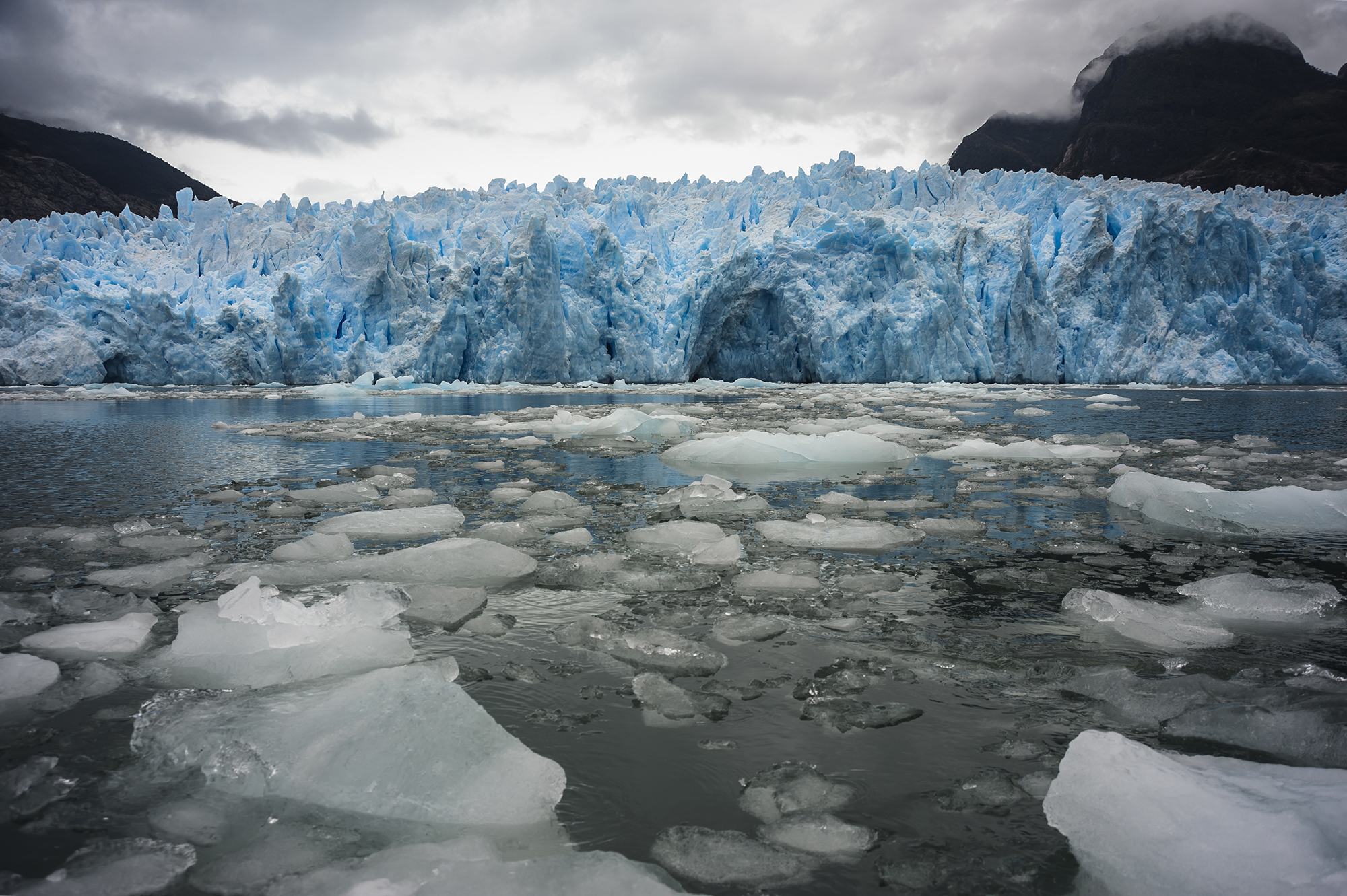
- View of the glacier over the San Rafael Lake.

- Location within Chile
- Interactive map of San Rafael Lake
- Location: Aysén Province
- Coordinates: 46°40′S 73°56′W
- Type: Proglacial tidal lagoon
- Primary outflows: Témpanos River
- Catchment area: 27,410 km^{2} (10,580 sq mi)
- Basin countries: Chile
- Max. length: 15 km (9.3 mi)
- Max. width: 11 km (6.8 mi)
- Surface area: 123 km^{2} (47 sq mi)
- Max. depth: 140 m (460 ft)
- Surface elevation: 0 m (0 ft)

San Rafael Lake is an arc-shaped coastal lake located in the Aysén del General Carlos Ibáñez del Campo Region of Chile, within the national park that bears its name. To the north the lagoon is connected to the Moraleda Channel, to the south lies the Ofqui Isthmus. To the west and east lie the Taitao Peninsula and the Northern Patagonian Ice Field respectively.

The lake was formed by the retreat of the San Rafael Glacier in the Northern Patagonian Ice Field. Today it is a popular tourism destination, and ships sail from Puerto Chacabuco, Puyuhuapi and Puerto Montt to the lagoon nearly every day to see the ice falling from the glacier into the lagoon. Cruises pass by this area.

The lake was visited by the Antonio de Vea expedition in December 1675. The expedition entered San Rafael Lake taking note of its windy conditions, the San Rafael Glacier and the swampy shores in the south that make up the Isthmus of Ofqui. Antonio de Vea entered San Rafael Lake through Río Témpanos (Spanish for "Ice Floe River") without mentioning any ice floe but stating that the San Rafael Glacier did not reach far into the lake. This has been interpreted to reflect that the effects of the Little Ice Age were not yet to be seen in the lake the late 17th century.

In 1857 Chilean navy officer Francisco Hudson and Francisco Fonck explored the lake seeking a passage that permitted navigation further south without the need to rounding the dangerous Tres Montes Peninsula.
