= San Rafael Glacier =

Glacier in southern Chile

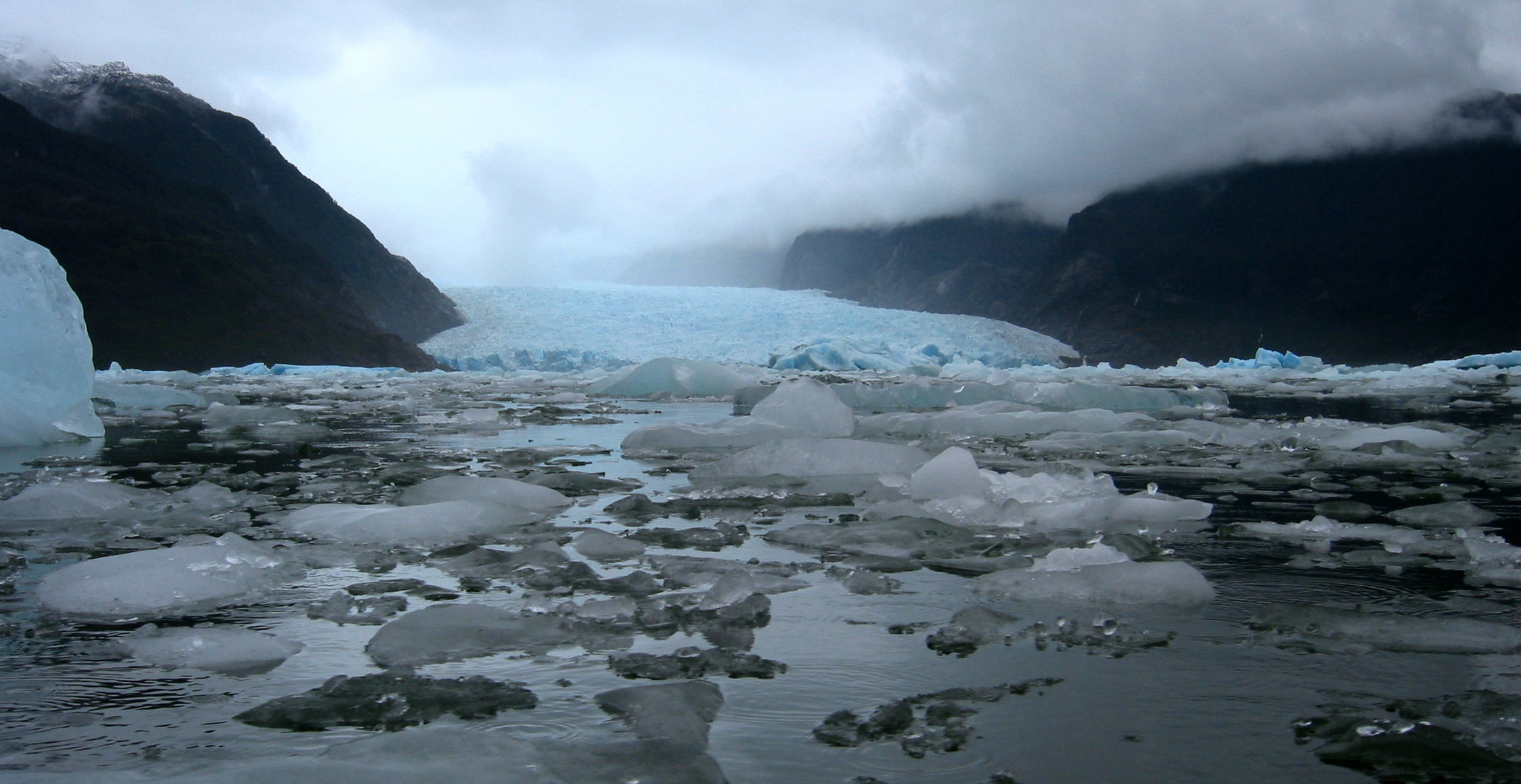
- Interactive map of San Rafael Glacier
- Location: Chile
- Coordinates: 46°42′S 73°50′W
- Area: 760 km^{2} (290 sq mi)
- Terminus: Proglacial lake

San Rafael Glacier

The San Rafael Glacier is one of the major outlet glaciers of the Northern Patagonian Ice Field in southern Chile and is the tidewater glacier nearest the equator. It calves into the Laguna San Rafael and is contained within Laguna San Rafael National Park.

== See also ==
- List of glaciers
