= Northern Patagonian Ice Field =

Series of glaciers in Chile

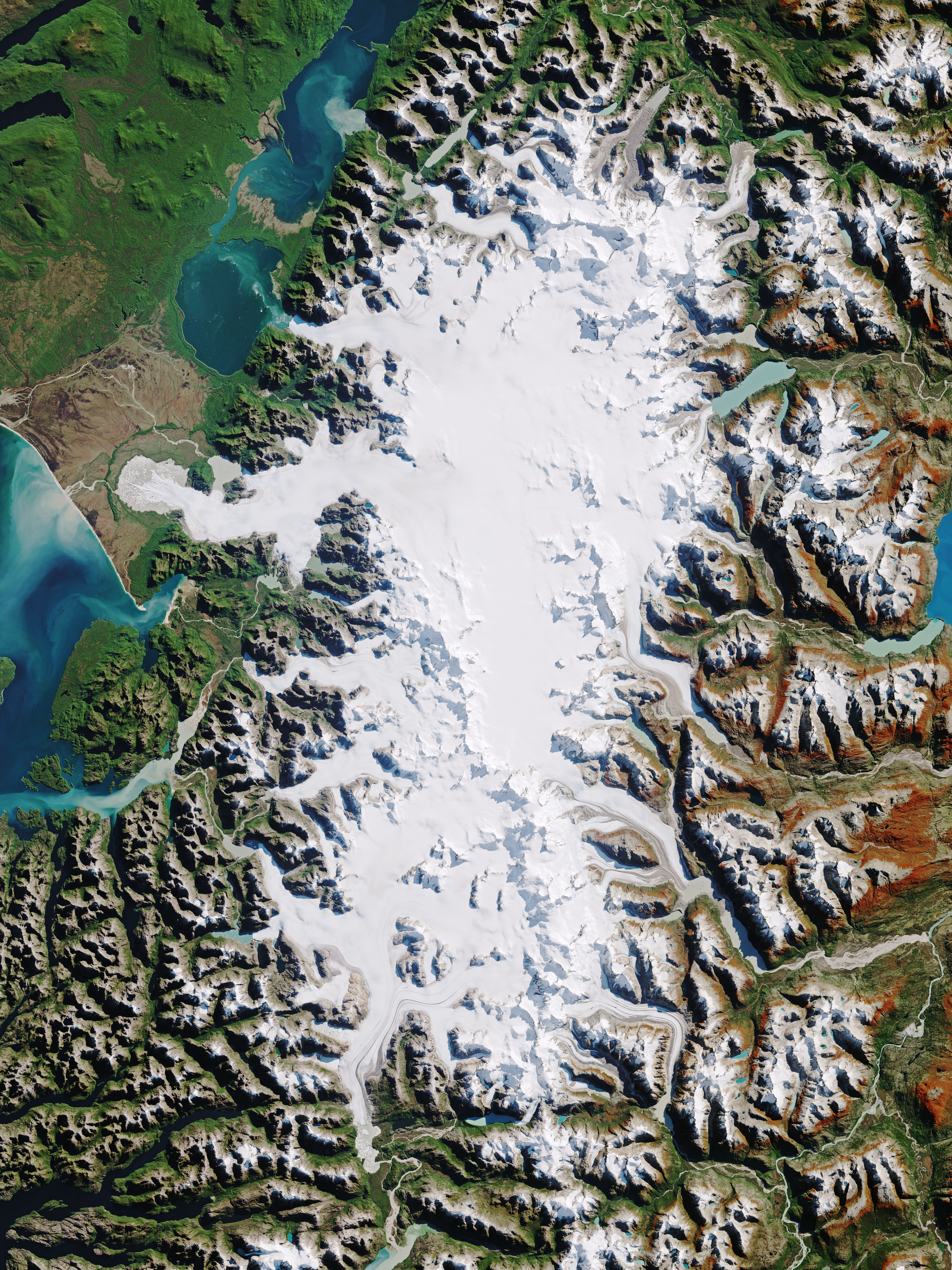
- Northern Patagonian Ice Field, May 2017

- Location within Chile
- Location: Aysén Region, Chile
- Coordinates: 47°00′S 73°30′W
- Area: 4,200 km^{2} (1,600 sq mi)

The Northern Patagonian Ice Field, located in southern Chile, is the smaller of two remnant parts in which the Patagonian Ice Sheet in the Andes Mountains of southern South America can be divided. It is completely contained within the boundaries of Laguna San Rafael National Park.

== Description ==
The Northern Patagonian Ice Field is a vestige of the Patagonian Ice Sheet, an extensive ice sheet that covered all of Chilean Patagonia and the westernmost parts of Argentine Patagonia during the Quaternary glaciations. Today, with its glaciers largely in retreat and only an area of 4,200 km^{2} (1,600 sq mi), it is still the second largest continuous mass of ice outside of the polar regions. Its survival depends on its elevation (1,100 to 1,500 m (3,600 to 4,900 ft)), favorable terrain and a cool, moist, oceanic climate. The ice field has 28 exit glaciers, the largest two — San Quintin and San Rafael — nearly reach sea level to the west at the Pacific Ocean. Smaller exit glaciers, like San Valentín and Nef, feed numerous rivers and glacially carved lakes to the east.

Eric Shipton accompanied by Spaniard Miguel Gómez and Chileans Eduardo García and Cedomir Marangunic crossed the icecap from the San Raphael Glacier into Argentina in the summer of 1963–64. In 1972/73 a Joint Services expedition led by Captain CH Agnew of Lochnaw yr, now Sir Crispin Agnew of Lochnaw, spent 5 months carrying out scientific research on and around the ice cap, including on the Benito Glacier, and three members of the expedition carried out a north-to-south crossing from the foot of Monte San Valentín down to the snout of the Steffen Glacier. Martin Session, the glaciologist on the 1972/3 expedition returned to the Benito Glacier with others in 2007 and 2011 to continue his research.

The Northern Patagonian Ice Field lies in fault-bounded crustal block that has been uplifted. To the west lies the Liquiñe-Ofqui Fault Zone, to the north the Exploradores Fault Zone and to the east the Cachet Fault. To the south there is possibly a zone of extensional faults around Tortel Fjord.

== See also ==
- Southern Patagonian Ice Field
- List of glaciers
