= Climate of Chile =

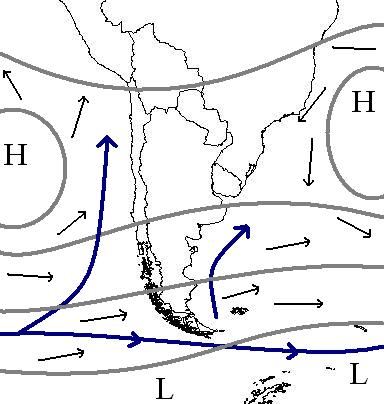
Prevailing winds, sea currents and stationary cyclones near Chile

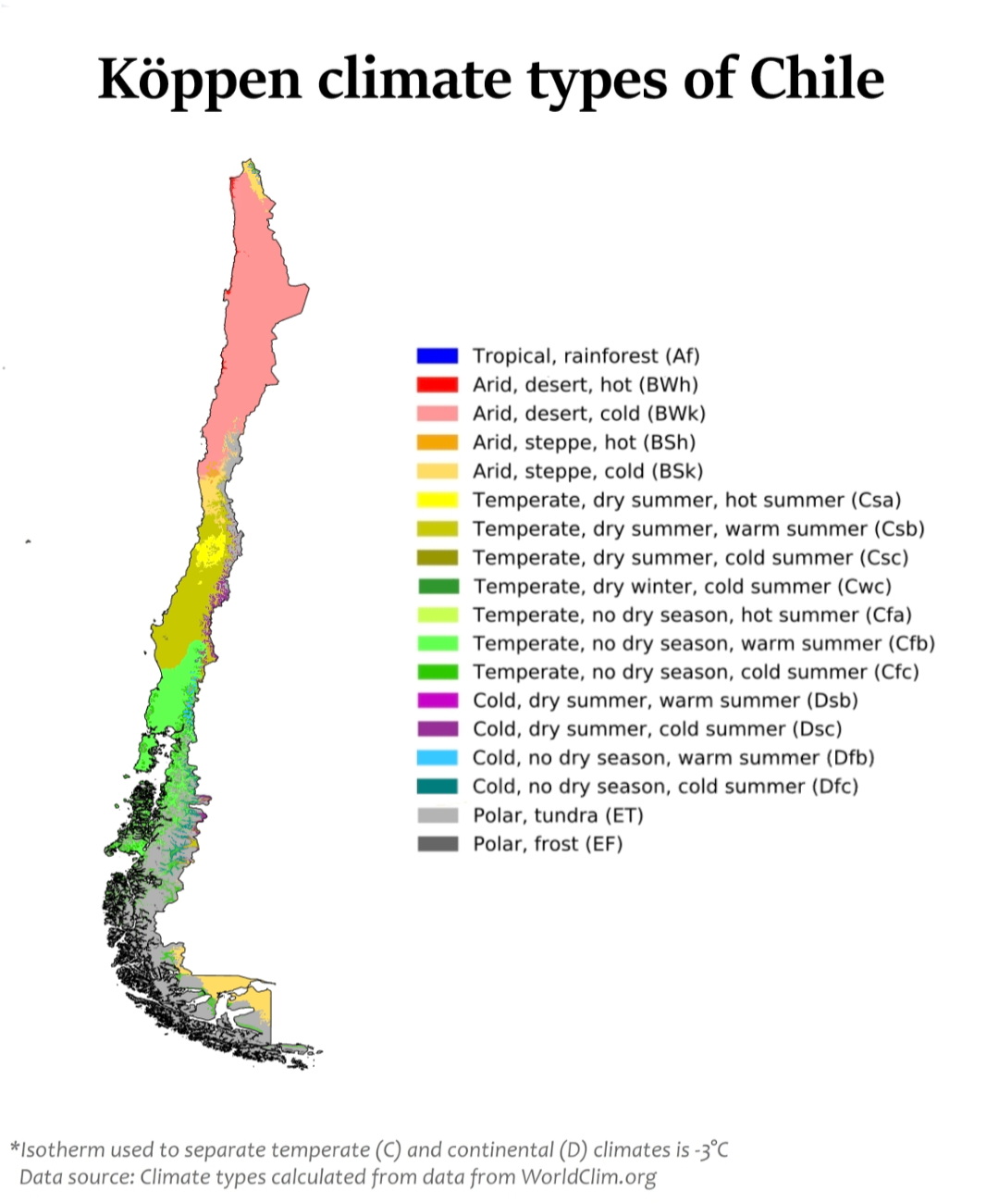
Chile map of Köppen climate classification.

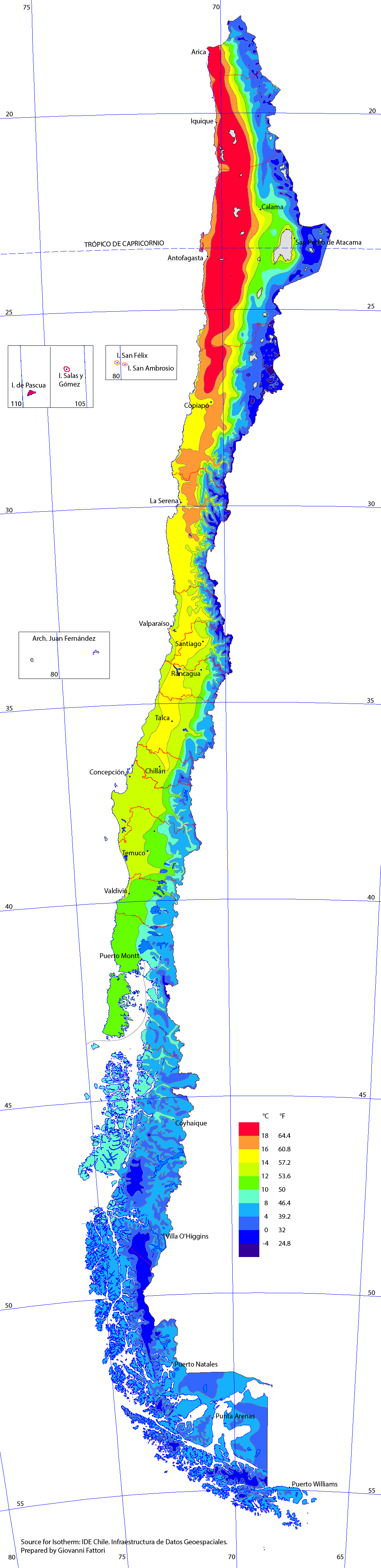
Annual average temperatures of Chile

Monthly mean temperatures of Chile

The climate of Chile comprises a wide range of weather conditions across a large geographic scale, extending across 38 degrees in latitude, making generalizations difficult. According to the Köppen system, Chile within its borders hosts at least seven major climatic subtypes, ranging from low desert in the north, to alpine tundra and glaciers in the east and southeast, tropical rainforest in Easter Island, Oceanic in the south and Mediterranean climate in central Chile. There are four seasons in most of the country: summer (December to February), autumn (March to May), winter (June to August), and spring (September to November).

On a synoptic scale, the most important factors that control the climate in Chile are the Pacific Anticyclone, the southern circumpolar low pressure area, the cold Humboldt current, the Chilean Coast Range and the Andes Mountains. Despite Chile's narrowness, some interior regions may experience wide temperature oscillations and cities such as Lonquimay, may even experience a continental climate. In the extreme northeast and southeast the border of Chile extends beyond the Andes into the Altiplano and the Patagonian plains, giving these regions climate patterns similar to those seen in Bolivia and Argentina respectively.

== Regions ==
It [Chile] has four months of winter, no more, and in them, except when there is a quarter moon, when it rains one or two days, all the other days have such a beautiful sunshine...

— Pedro de Valdivia to Charles V, Holy Roman Emperor

Climate	Ecoregion	Natural region
Desert (BWh, BWk)	Atacama Desert	Norte Grande
Mediterranean (Csa, Csb, Csc)	Chilean matorral	Central Chile
Tropical rainforest (Af)	Easter Island	-
Humid subtropical (Cfa)	Fernandezian region	-
Temperate monsoon (Cwc)	Altiplano	Norte Grande
Temperate oceanic (Cfb)	Valdivian temperate rainforests	Zona Sur, Zona Austral
Subpolar oceanic (Cfc)	Magellanic subpolar forests Magellanic moorland	Zona Austral
Tundra (ET)	Magellanic subpolar forests Magellanic moorland	Zona Austral
Continental subalpine (Dsb, Dsc)	Andes	Central Chile
Semi-arid (BSk)	Patagonian Desert	Zona Austral
Alpine (ETH, EB)	Andes, Central Andean dry puna	all natural regions of Chile
Tundra (ET)	Andes, Central Andean dry puna	all natural regions of Chile
Ice cap (EF)	Northern Patagonian Ice Field, Southern Patagonian Ice Field	Zona Austral

=== Tropical ===
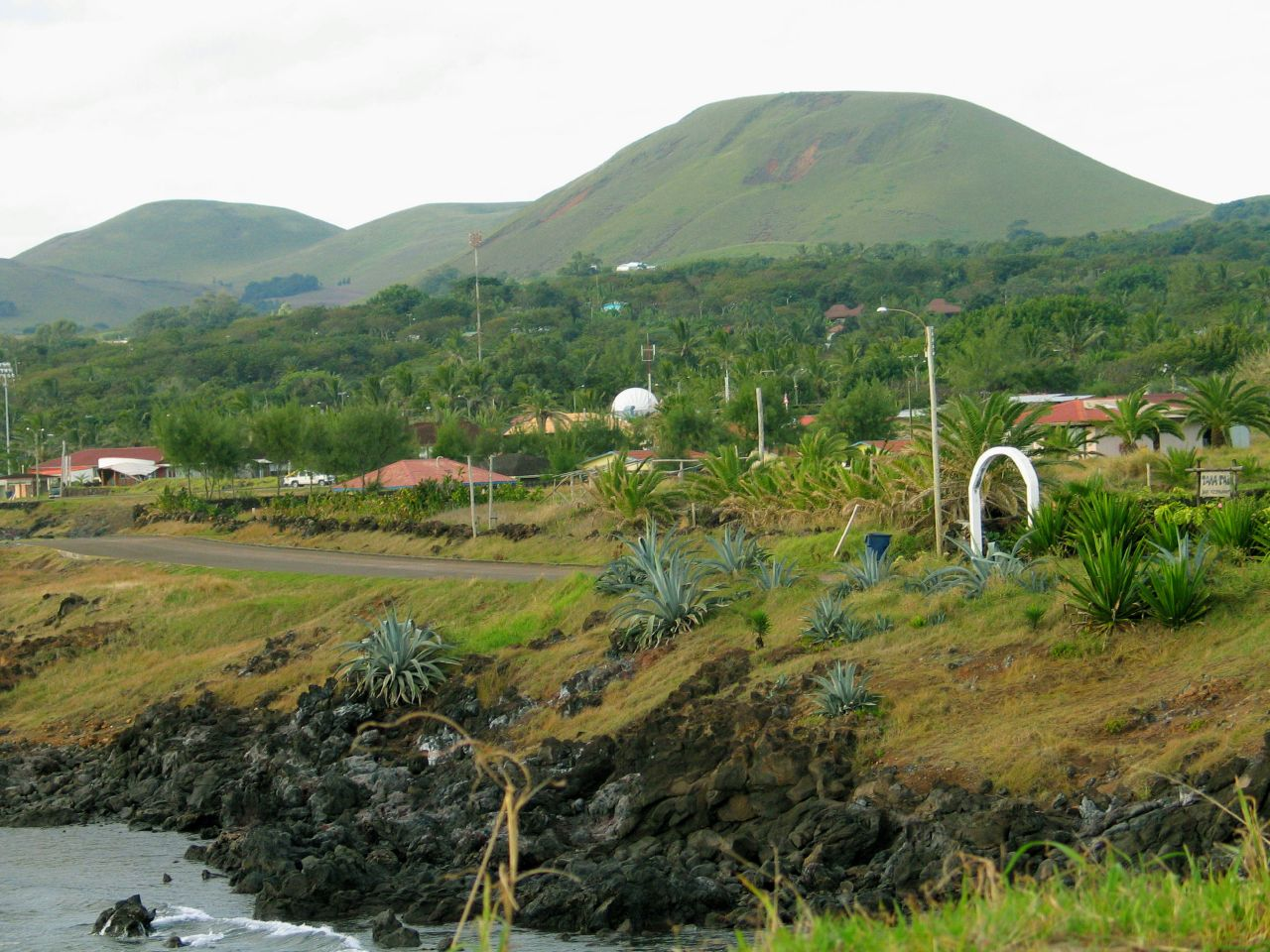
View toward the interior of Easter Island

The climate of Easter Island is tropical rainforest. The lowest temperatures are registered in July and August (18 °C (64 °F)) and the highest in February (maximum temperature 28 °C (82 °F)), the summer season in the southern hemisphere. Winters are relatively mild. The rainiest month is April, though the island experiences year-round rainfall. As an isolated island, Easter Island is constantly exposed to winds which help to keep the temperature fairly cool. Precipitation averages 1,118 mm per year. Occasionally, heavy rainfall and rainstorms strike the island. These occur mostly in the winter months (June–August). Since it is close to the Pacific High and outside the range of the ITCZ, cyclones and hurricanes do not occur around Easter island.

=== Dry arid ===
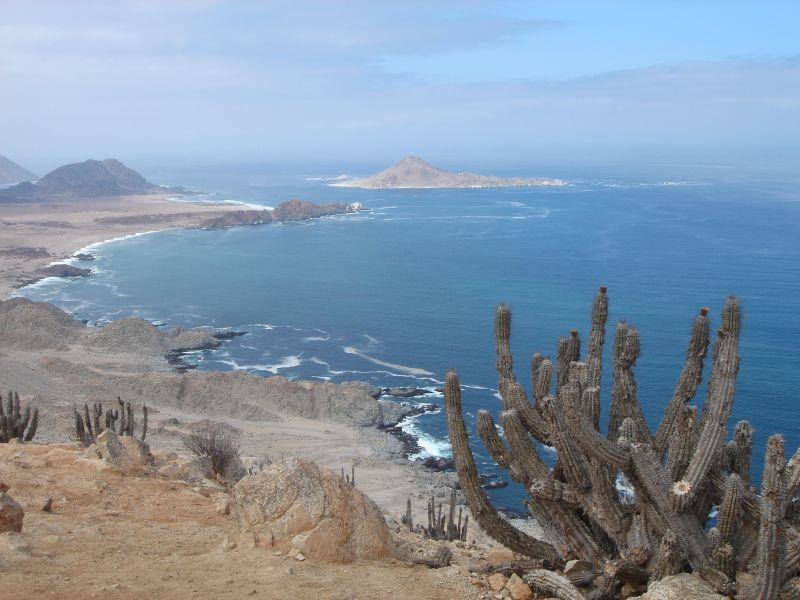
Pan de Azúcar National Park in Atacama Desert

The Atacama Desert is the driest place on Earth, and is virtually sterile because it is blocked from moisture on both sides by the Andes mountains and by the Chilean Coast Range. The cold Humboldt Current and the Pacific Anticyclone are essential to keep the dry climate of Atacama Desert. The average rainfall in the Chilean region of Antofagasta is just 1 mm per year. Some weather stations in the Atacama have never received rain. Evidence suggests that the Atacama may not have had any significant rainfall from 1570 to 1971. It is so arid that mountains that reach as high as 6,885 metres (22,590 feet) are completely free of glaciers and, the southern part from 25°S to 27°S, may have been glacier-free throughout the Quaternary—though permafrost extends down to an altitude of 4,400 metres and is continuous above 5,600 metres. Studies by a group of British scientists have suggested that some river beds have been dry for 120,000 years.

Some locations in the Atacama do receive a marine fog known locally as the Camanchaca (garúa in Peru), providing sufficient moisture for hypolithic algae, lichens and even some cacti. But in the region that is in the "fog shadow" of the high coastal crest-line, which averages 3,000 m height for about 100 km south of Antofagasta, the soil has been compared to that of Mars.

As the climate map shows, where elevation is high enough to preclude any month with an average temperature of 10°C, precipitation is low enough to allow a transition between a cold desert (Köppen classification BWk) and tundra (ET).

=== Mediterranean ===
Mediterranean climate distribution in the Americas. Note that the map of Chile is turned upside down

The climate of Central Chile is of temperate Mediterranean type, with the amount of rainfall increasing considerably and progressively from north to south. In the Santiago area, the average monthly temperatures are about 19.5 °C in the summer months of January and February and 7.5 °C in the winter months of June and July. The average monthly precipitation is no more than a trace in January and February and 69.7 millimeters in June and July. By contrast, in Concepción the average monthly temperatures are somewhat lower in the summer at 17.6 °C but higher in the winter at 9.3 °C, and the amount of rain is much greater. In the summer, Concepción receives an average of twenty millimeters of rain per month; in June and July, the city is pounded by an average of 253 millimeters per month. The numerous rivers greatly increase their flow as a result of the winter rains and the spring melting of the Andean snows, and they contract considerably in the summer. The combination of abundant snow in the Andes and relatively moderate winter temperatures creates excellent conditions for Alpine skiing. Areas around the Bío-Bío River, historically called La Frontera corresponds to southern limit of the mediterranean climate, with typical mediterranean fruits such as avocado, citrus, olives and grapes being cultivated north of it and oat, wheat, apples and potatoes to the south. This more or less drastic transition is caused by the split of the westerlies at these latitudes (~37° S) into one branch going to the southeast and another to the northeast, to this it is necessary to add the north-south lowering of the Chilean Coast Range which reduced the rain shadow effect.

=== Temperate oceanic ===
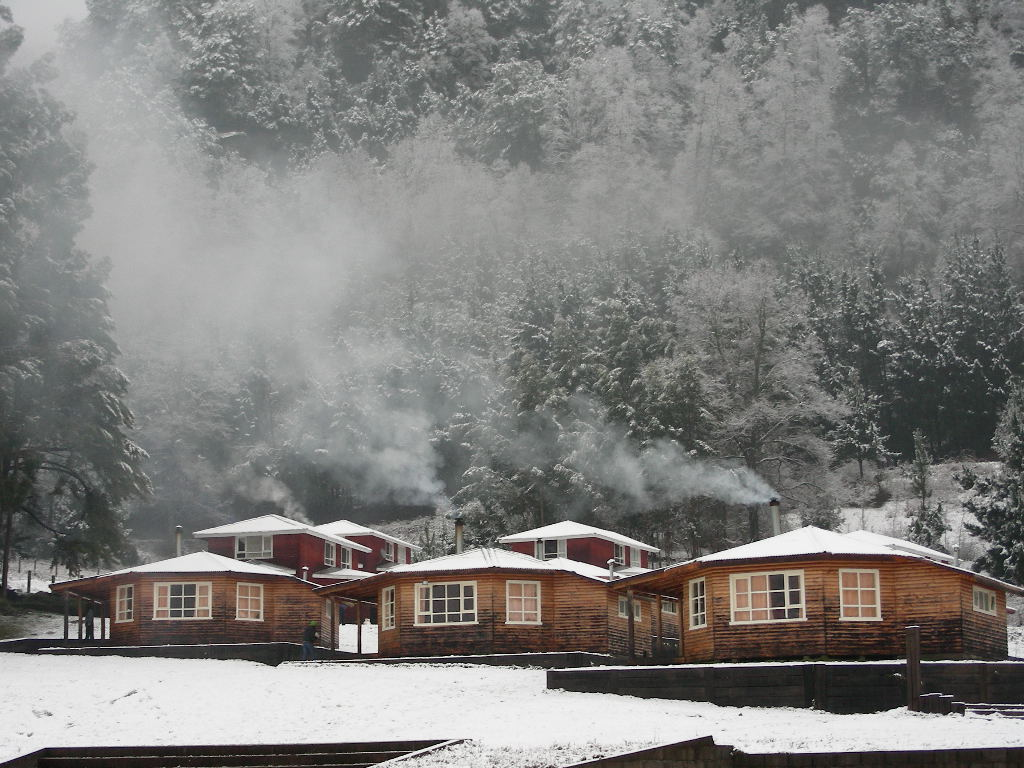
Maritime influence makes some southern Andean valleys prone to snowfalls in winter such as in Curarrehue in the picture.

In Zona Sur and the northern part of Zona Austral the climate is Temperate oceanic. Here the Andean Cordillera intercepts moist westerly winds along the Pacific coast during winter and summer months; these winds cool as they ascend the mountains, creating heavy rainfall on the mountains' west-facing slopes. The northward-flowing oceanic Humboldt Current creates humid and foggy conditions near the coast. The tree line is at about 2,400 m in the northern part of the ecoregion (35° S), and descends to 1,000 m in the south of the Valdivian region. In the summer average temperature can climb to 16.5 °C (62 °F), while during winter the temperature can drop below 7 °C (45 °F).

=== Subpolar oceanic ===
The seasonal temperature in Zona Austral is greatly moderated by its proximity to the ocean and is known for its stable constant temperatures, only small variability with season. The heaviest rainfalls goes between April and May and snow season goes all through Chilean winter (June till September), although the average temperature does not descend below 1 °C in coastal areas. This is the coldest region of South America. Puerto Natales in Zona Austral is the city with most rainy days per year in Chile, averaging 161.

== Climate change ==
Climate change is expected to alter the frequency and severity of various natural hazards in Chile, including wildfires, floods, landslides, droughts and rising sea levels. Key sectors vulnerable to climate change impacts include agriculture, fisheries, agriculture and water security.

In 2023 Chile emitted 107.99 million tonnes of greenhouse gases, equivalent to around 0.2% of the global total. In recent years Chile has emerged as a global leader in clean energy, particularly solar and wind. and has committed to net zero by 2050. According to Climate Action Tracker, the nation is making "considerable progress" in climate action by expanding renewables and phasing-out coal.

== Climate charts for different locations of Chile from north to south ==
Iquique

Climate chart (precipitation, max. and min. temperature)
J	F	M	A	M	J	J	A	S	O	N	D
0 25 18	0 25 18	0 24 17	0 22 15	0.2 20 14	0.1 19 14	0 18 13	0 18 13	0 19 14	0 20 15	0 22 15	0.2 24 17
- █ Average max. and min. temperatures in °C
- █ Precipitation totals in mm
Imperial conversion
J	F	M	A	M	J	J	A	S	O	N	D
0 77 64	0 77 64	0 75 62	0 72 59	0 69 57	0 66 56	0 64 56	0 65 56	0 66 57	0 68 58	0 71 60	0 74 62
- █ Average max. and min. temperatures in °F
- █ Precipitation totals in inches

Antofagasta

Climate chart (precipitation, max. and min. temperature)
J	F	M	A	M	J	J	A	S	O	N	D
0 24 17	0 24 17	0 23 16	0 21 14	0 19 13	0.1 18 11	0.3 17 11	0.6 17 11	0.5 18 12	0.1 19 13	0.1 20 14	0 22 16
- █ Average max. and min. temperatures in °C
- █ Precipitation totals in mm
Imperial conversion
J	F	M	A	M	J	J	A	S	O	N	D
0 75 62	0 75 62	0 73 60	0 70 57	0 66 55	0 64 53	0 62 51	0 63 53	0 64 54	0 66 56	0 69 58	0 72 60
- █ Average max. and min. temperatures in °F
- █ Precipitation totals in inches

Arica

Climate chart (precipitation, max. and min. temperature)
J	F	M	A	M	J	J	A	S	O	N	D
0 26 19	0.1 27 19	0 26 18	0 24 17	0 22 15	0.2 20 14	0.1 19 14	0.1 19 14	0 19 14	0 21 15	0 23 16	0 25 18
- █ Average max. and min. temperatures in °C
- █ Precipitation totals in mm
Imperial conversion
J	F	M	A	M	J	J	A	S	O	N	D
0 79 66	0 80 66	0 79 65	0 75 62	0 71 59	0 67 58	0 65 57	0 65 57	0 67 58	0 69 60	0 73 61	0 76 64
- █ Average max. and min. temperatures in °F
- █ Precipitation totals in inches

Easter Island

Climate chart (precipitation, max. and min. temperature)
J	F	M	A	M	J	J	A	S	O	N	D
73 27 20	85 27 20	96 27 20	121 25 19	153 23 18	106 22 17	105 21 16	94 21 15	87 22 16	68 23 16	74 24 17	85 25 18
- █ Average max. and min. temperatures in °C
- █ Precipitation totals in mm
Imperial conversion
J	F	M	A	M	J	J	A	S	O	N	D
2.9 81 68	3.3 81 68	3.8 80 68	4.8 78 66	6 74 64	4.2 72 62	4.1 70 60	3.7 70 60	3.4 71 60	2.7 73 61	2.9 75 63	3.4 78 65
- █ Average max. and min. temperatures in °F
- █ Precipitation totals in inches

Copiapó

Climate chart (precipitation, max. and min. temperature)
J	F	M	A	M	J	J	A	S	O	N	D
0 28 13	0 28 13	1.1 27 12	0.2 24 10	0.4 22 8	1.1 20 6	6.5 20 6	2 21 6	0.2 22 7	0.5 24 9	0 25 10	0 27 12
- █ Average max. and min. temperatures in °C
- █ Precipitation totals in mm
Imperial conversion
J	F	M	A	M	J	J	A	S	O	N	D
0 83 56	0 83 56	0 80 54	0 75 50	0 71 46	0 68 43	0.3 67 42	0.1 70 43	0 72 45	0 75 47	0 78 51	0 80 54
- █ Average max. and min. temperatures in °F
- █ Precipitation totals in inches

La Serena

Climate chart (precipitation, max. and min. temperature)
J	F	M	A	M	J	J	A	S	O	N	D
0 22 14	0 22 13	0.2 20 12	1.1 18 11	6.1 17 9	15 16 8	31 15 8	17 16 8	5.8 16 9	2.7 18 10	0.2 19 11	0 20 12
- █ Average max. and min. temperatures in °C
- █ Precipitation totals in mm
Imperial conversion
J	F	M	A	M	J	J	A	S	O	N	D
0 71 56	0 71 56	0 68 54	0 65 51	0.2 63 49	0.6 61 46	1.2 60 46	0.7 60 46	0.2 61 48	0.1 64 49	0 66 51	0 69 54
- █ Average max. and min. temperatures in °F
- █ Precipitation totals in inches

Santiago

Climate chart (precipitation, max. and min. temperature)
J	F	M	A	M	J	J	A	S	O	N	D
0.4 30 13	0.8 29 12	3.2 27 11	10 23 8	42 19 6	70 15 4	87 15 4	52 17 5	22 19 6	13 22 8	9.2 25 10	2.1 28 12
- █ Average max. and min. temperatures in °C
- █ Precipitation totals in mm
- Source: WMO
Imperial conversion
J	F	M	A	M	J	J	A	S	O	N	D
0 85 55	0 84 54	0.1 80 51	0.4 74 46	1.7 66 43	2.8 59 40	3.4 59 39	2 62 41	0.9 66 43	0.5 72 47	0.4 78 50	0.1 83 54
- █ Average max. and min. temperatures in °F
- █ Precipitation totals in inches

Linares

Climate chart (precipitation, max. and min. temperature)
J	F	M	A	M	J	J	A	S	O	N	D
13 30 12	10 29 11	20 25 9	62 21 6	171 16 7	208 12 5	180 12 4	129 14 4	77 17 5	44 20 8	30 24 9	20 28 12
- █ Average max. and min. temperatures in °C
- █ Precipitation totals in mm
Imperial conversion
J	F	M	A	M	J	J	A	S	O	N	D
0.5 86 53	0.4 83 53	0.8 77 48	2.4 69 44	6.7 60 44	8.2 54 41	7.1 54 38	5.1 57 39	3 63 42	1.7 69 46	1.2 74 48	0.8 83 53
- █ Average max. and min. temperatures in °F
- █ Precipitation totals in inches

Concepción

Climate chart (precipitation, max. and min. temperature)
J	F	M	A	M	J	J	A	S	O	N	D
21 23 11	15 22 10	25 21 9	56 18 8	178 16 7	218 13 6	222 13 6	153 14 6	88 15 6	65 17 7	41 19 8	28 22 10
- █ Average max. and min. temperatures in °C
- █ Precipitation totals in mm
Imperial conversion
J	F	M	A	M	J	J	A	S	O	N	D
0.8 73 51	0.6 72 50	1 70 48	2.2 65 46	7 60 45	8.6 56 43	8.7 55 42	6 57 42	3.4 59 42	2.6 62 44	1.6 67 47	1.1 71 50
- █ Average max. and min. temperatures in °F
- █ Precipitation totals in inches

Valdivia

Climate chart (precipitation, max. and min. temperature)
J	F	M	A	M	J	J	A	S	O	N	D
54 23 9	55 23 9	71 21 7	133 17 6	295 14 6	297 11 5	312 11 4	247 12 4	162 15 4	109 17 5	73 19 7	63 21 8
- █ Average max. and min. temperatures in °C
- █ Precipitation totals in mm
Imperial conversion
J	F	M	A	M	J	J	A	S	O	N	D
2.1 73 48	2.1 73 47	2.8 69 45	5.2 63 42	12 56 43	12 52 40	12 51 40	9.7 54 39	6.4 58 39	4.3 62 41	2.9 66 44	2.5 71 47
- █ Average max. and min. temperatures in °F
- █ Precipitation totals in inches

Puerto Montt

Climate chart (precipitation, max. and min. temperature)
J	F	M	A	M	J	J	A	S	O	N	D
90 20 9	93 19 9	99 18 8	143 15 7	234 13 6	224 11 4	229 10 4	209 11 4	146 13 4	121 14 6	112 17 7	103 19 9
- █ Average max. and min. temperatures in °C
- █ Precipitation totals in mm
Imperial conversion
J	F	M	A	M	J	J	A	S	O	N	D
3.5 67 49	3.7 67 48	3.9 64 46	5.6 59 44	9.2 55 43	8.8 51 39	9 51 39	8.2 52 39	5.7 55 40	4.8 58 42	4.4 62 45	4.1 65 47
- █ Average max. and min. temperatures in °F
- █ Precipitation totals in inches

Aisén

Climate chart (precipitation, max. and min. temperature)
J	F	M	A	M	J	J	A	S	O	N	D
196 18 10	159 18 10	166 16 8	239 13 7	320 10 5	283 7 2	280 7 2	258 9 3	209 11 4	163 14 6	168 15 8	208 17 9
- █ Average max. and min. temperatures in °C
- █ Precipitation totals in mm
Imperial conversion
J	F	M	A	M	J	J	A	S	O	N	D
7.7 64 50	6.3 64 49	6.5 61 47	9.4 55 44	13 49 40	11 45 36	11 44 35	10 47 37	8.2 52 39	6.4 56 42	6.6 60 46	8.2 63 48
- █ Average max. and min. temperatures in °F
- █ Precipitation totals in inches

Balmaceda

Climate chart (precipitation, max. and min. temperature)
J	F	M	A	M	J	J	A	S	O	N	D
28 18 7	20 18 6	38 16 5	54 12 3	93 8 1	85 4 −2	84 4 −3	72 6 −1	49 9 0	30 12 2	28 15 4	32 16 6
- █ Average max. and min. temperatures in °C
- █ Precipitation totals in mm
Imperial conversion
J	F	M	A	M	J	J	A	S	O	N	D
1.1 64 44	0.8 64 43	1.5 60 40	2.1 53 37	3.6 46 33	3.4 40 28	3.3 38 27	2.8 43 30	1.9 49 32	1.2 54 36	1.1 58 40	1.2 62 42
- █ Average max. and min. temperatures in °F
- █ Precipitation totals in inches

Punta Arenas

Climate chart (precipitation, max. and min. temperature)
J	F	M	A	M	J	J	A	S	O	N	D
39 15 7	28 14 6	30 13 5	36 10 3	42 6 1	29 4 −1	30 4 −1	30 5 −1	24 8 1	29 11 3	32 13 4	29 14 6
- █ Average max. and min. temperatures in °C
- █ Precipitation totals in mm
Imperial conversion
J	F	M	A	M	J	J	A	S	O	N	D
1.5 58 44	1.1 58 43	1.2 55 41	1.4 50 38	1.6 44 34	1.1 40 31	1.2 39 30	1.2 42 30	1 46 34	1.1 51 37	1.2 55 40	1.1 57 42
- █ Average max. and min. temperatures in °F
- █ Precipitation totals in inches

== See also ==
- Agriculture in Chile
- Drought in Chile
- Geology of Chile
- Glaciers of Chile
- Natural regions of Chile
- Rainy season in the Altiplano
- White Earthquake
