= Natural regions of Chile =

Broad range of ecosystems and climates in the South American country

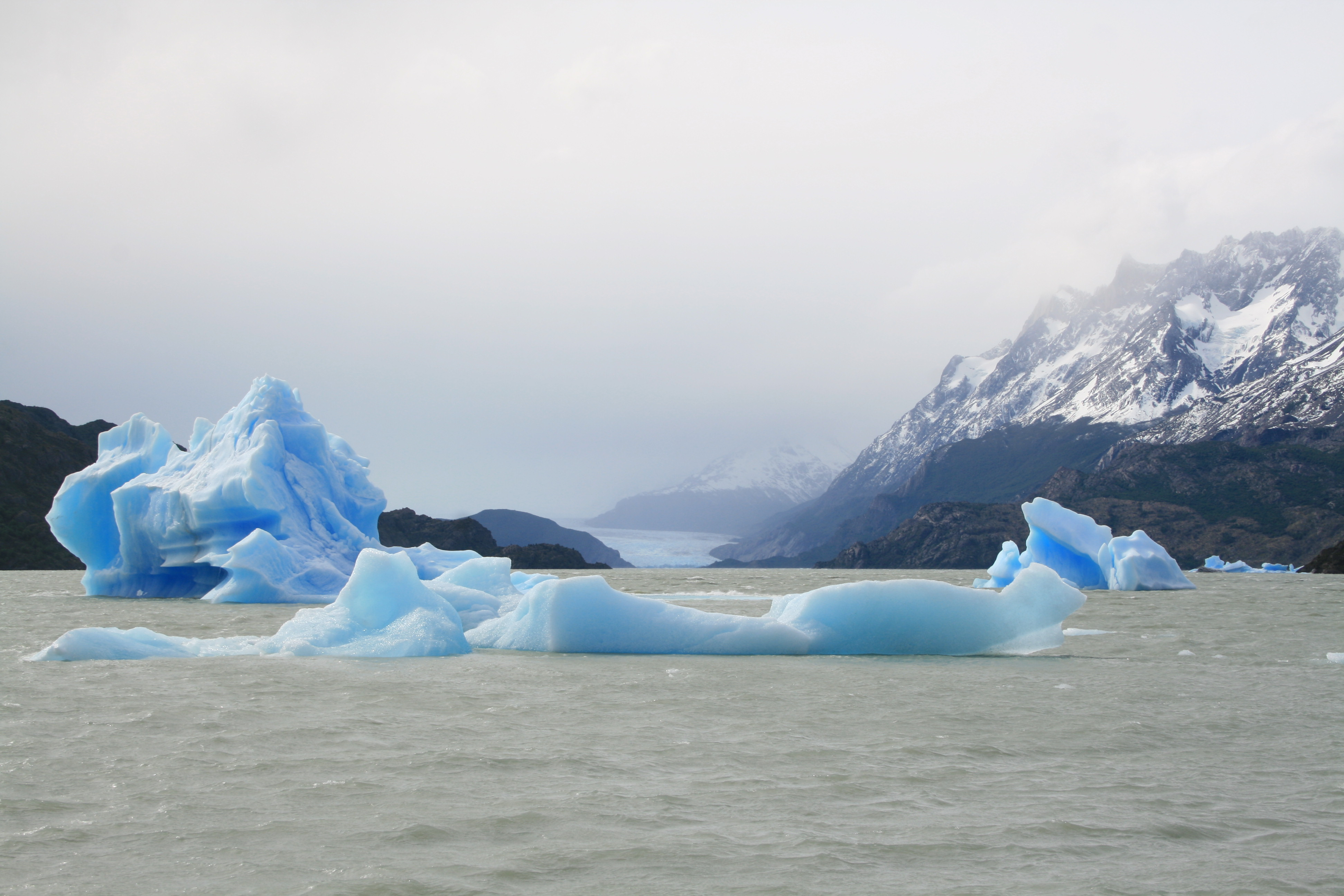
The Grey Glacier of Chile's Torres del Paine National Park is located in the Zona Austral natural region.

Because Chile extends from a point about 625 kilometers north of the Tropic of Capricorn to a point hardly more than 1,400 kilometers north of the Antarctic Circle, within its territory can be found a broad selection of the Earth's climates.

In 1950, CORFO defined, following criteria of geographic and economic homogeneity, six regions in continental Chile: Norte Grande, Norte Chico, Núcleo Central, Concepción y La Frontera, Los Lagos and Los Canales.

Although this territorial division was never used to define administrative entities (as the current Regions of Chile), the natural regions continue to be used for reference purposes.

== Overview ==
These natural regions are ordered from north to south and reduced to five natural regions: Each has its own characteristic vegetation, fauna, climate, and, despite the omnipresence of both the Andes and the Pacific, its own distinct topography.

Map of the natural regions of Chile

Natural Regions	Regions of Chile	Characteristics
Norte Grande (Far North)	Arica & Parinacota Region	Desert climate with areas of extreme aridity. Coastal cliffs, high coast range, intermediate depression and Andes. Plateaus in the Andes. Salt flats, copper and saltpeter deposits in the interior. Puna grassland with summer precipitation in the eastern fringes.
Norte Grande (Far North)	Tarapacá Region	Desert climate with areas of extreme aridity. Coastal cliffs, high coast range, intermediate depression and Andes. Plateaus in the Andes. Salt flats, copper and saltpeter deposits in the interior. Puna grassland with summer precipitation in the eastern fringes.
Norte Grande (Far North)	Antofagasta Region	Desert climate with areas of extreme aridity. Coastal cliffs, high coast range, intermediate depression and Andes. Plateaus in the Andes. Salt flats, copper and saltpeter deposits in the interior. Puna grassland with summer precipitation in the eastern fringes.
Norte Grande (Far North)	North Atacama Region	Desert climate with areas of extreme aridity. Coastal cliffs, high coast range, intermediate depression and Andes. Plateaus in the Andes. Salt flats, copper and saltpeter deposits in the interior. Puna grassland with summer precipitation in the eastern fringes.
Copiapó River (27° S)
Norte Chico (Near North)	South Atacama Region	Semi-arid climate. Coast range and Andes merge, transversal east-west valleys instead of intermediate depression. Agriculture limited to narrow valley bottoms. Periodic flowering in parts of the desert. No volcanism. Important gold, copper and iron deposits.
Norte Chico (Near North)	Coquimbo Region	Semi-arid climate. Coast range and Andes merge, transversal east-west valleys instead of intermediate depression. Agriculture limited to narrow valley bottoms. Periodic flowering in parts of the desert. No volcanism. Important gold, copper and iron deposits.
Norte Chico (Near North)	North Valparaíso Region	Semi-arid climate. Coast range and Andes merge, transversal east-west valleys instead of intermediate depression. Agriculture limited to narrow valley bottoms. Periodic flowering in parts of the desert. No volcanism. Important gold, copper and iron deposits.
Aconcagua River (33° S)
Zona Central (Central Chile)	South Valparaíso Region	Mediterranean climate and Matorral vegetation. The Andes is massive and high. Coast range and Andes lose height as they separate from each other to the south, fertile intermediate depression. Summer runoff of large rivers is heavily dependent on glacier and snowmelt.
Zona Central (Central Chile)	Santiago Metropolitan Region	Mediterranean climate and Matorral vegetation. The Andes is massive and high. Coast range and Andes lose height as they separate from each other to the south, fertile intermediate depression. Summer runoff of large rivers is heavily dependent on glacier and snowmelt.
Zona Central (Central Chile)	O'Higgins Region	Mediterranean climate and Matorral vegetation. The Andes is massive and high. Coast range and Andes lose height as they separate from each other to the south, fertile intermediate depression. Summer runoff of large rivers is heavily dependent on glacier and snowmelt.
Zona Central (Central Chile)	Maule Region	Mediterranean climate and Matorral vegetation. The Andes is massive and high. Coast range and Andes lose height as they separate from each other to the south, fertile intermediate depression. Summer runoff of large rivers is heavily dependent on glacier and snowmelt.
Zona Central (Central Chile)	Ñuble Region	Mediterranean climate and Matorral vegetation. The Andes is massive and high. Coast range and Andes lose height as they separate from each other to the south, fertile intermediate depression. Summer runoff of large rivers is heavily dependent on glacier and snowmelt.
Zona Central (Central Chile)	North Bío-Bío Region	Mediterranean climate and Matorral vegetation. The Andes is massive and high. Coast range and Andes lose height as they separate from each other to the south, fertile intermediate depression. Summer runoff of large rivers is heavily dependent on glacier and snowmelt.
Bío-Bío River (37° S)
Zona Sur (Southern Zone)	South Bío-Bío Region	Temperate oceanic climate and Valdivian vegetation. Coast range and Andes are low, intermediate depression near sea level. Lakes of glacial origin, intensive volcanic and geothermal activity.
Zona Sur (Southern Zone)	Araucanía Region	Temperate oceanic climate and Valdivian vegetation. Coast range and Andes are low, intermediate depression near sea level. Lakes of glacial origin, intensive volcanic and geothermal activity.
Zona Sur (Southern Zone)	Los Ríos Region	Temperate oceanic climate and Valdivian vegetation. Coast range and Andes are low, intermediate depression near sea level. Lakes of glacial origin, intensive volcanic and geothermal activity.
Zona Sur (Southern Zone)	North Los Lagos Region	Temperate oceanic climate and Valdivian vegetation. Coast range and Andes are low, intermediate depression near sea level. Lakes of glacial origin, intensive volcanic and geothermal activity.
Chacao Channel (42° S)
Zona Austral (Austral Zone)	South Los Lagos Region	Subpolar oceanic climate in the west and steppe climate in the east. Magellanic forest and Magellanic moorland vegetation in the west, grasslands in the east. Glacial landscape; Coast range consists of islands, intermediate depression absent or under sea level. Fjords and ice fields in the Andes.
Zona Austral (Austral Zone)	Aisén Region	Subpolar oceanic climate in the west and steppe climate in the east. Magellanic forest and Magellanic moorland vegetation in the west, grasslands in the east. Glacial landscape; Coast range consists of islands, intermediate depression absent or under sea level. Fjords and ice fields in the Andes.
Zona Austral (Austral Zone)	Magallanes Region	Subpolar oceanic climate in the west and steppe climate in the east. Magellanic forest and Magellanic moorland vegetation in the west, grasslands in the east. Glacial landscape; Coast range consists of islands, intermediate depression absent or under sea level. Fjords and ice fields in the Andes.

== Norte Grande ==
Most of the region is covered by the Atacama Desert and has a dry arid climate. The coast range has peaks over 2000 m and ends in cliffs in the coast. There are large salt flats in the Intermediate depression and the Andes. Norte Grande has Chile's highest mountains including Ojos del Salado (6,891 m) but host also the Altiplano and puna high plateaus.

== Norte Chico ==
The region has semi-arid climate, characterized by the transition from the Atacama Desert to the Mediterranean Matorral vegetation. The coast range and the Andes merges in this zone leaving no space for the Intermediate depression which is "replaced" by several transversal (east-west) valleys. The lack of an intermediate depression and absence of volcanic activity are believed to be the result of the flat-slab subduction of the Juan Fernández Ridge.

== Zona Central ==
Mediterranean climate, vegetation of the Chilean Matorral. The Intermediate Depression of central Chile extends from Santiago to the south as a fertile region and is considered the agricultural heartland of Chile. After the Destruction of Seven Cities (1598–1604), all major settlements within the colonial Captaincy General of Chile came to be confined in central Chile, excepting only La Serena and the Chiloé Archipelago.

== Zona Sur ==
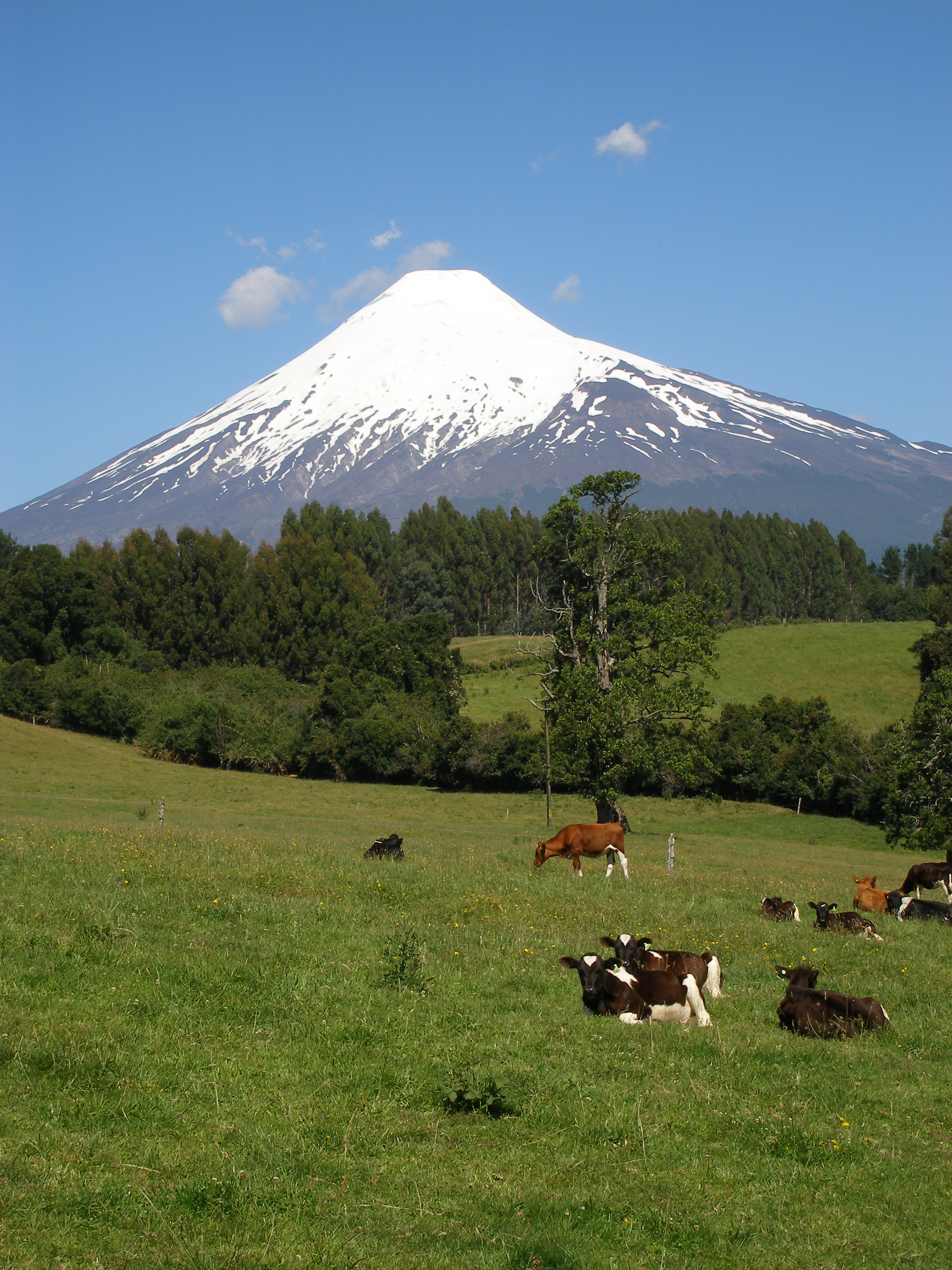
Cattle grazing near Llanquihue Lake. Osorno Volcano in the background.

Temperate oceanic climate, vegetation of Valdivian temperate rain forests. The coast range is lower than further north with no peak over 1,500 m. The Intermediate depression is close to sea level. There are features from the Last Glacial Maximum in the Andes and the Intermediate depression such as moraines and glacial lakes. Intensive volcanism in the Andes in form of volcanoes and hot springs.

== Zona Austral ==
Covers all of Chilean Patagonia, and the Chiloé Archipelago. Zona austral has a subpolar oceanic climate and a vegetation of Magellanic subpolar forests in the west and Patagonian grasslands in the east. The former Patagonian Ice Sheet have eroded the coast range so that it now of islands and is not present south of Taitao Peninsula. The Intermediate depression is under the sea level. Fjords penetrate the Andes where there are also two ice sheets and several glacial lakes.

== See also ==
- Climate of Chile
- Geography of Chile
- Geology of Chile
