= Barbarita Lara =

Chilean engineer and researcher

- Born: 27 January 1986 (age 40); Santiago
- Education: Universidad Técnica Federico Santa María
- Occupations: Computer engineer, researcher and entrepreneur

Barbarita Lara Martínez (Santiago de Chile, 27 January 1986) is a Chilean engineer. She is currently the CEO and co-founder of EMERCOM, a technologic company which intend to develop solutions of communication. She is also the Chief of the Sistema de Información de Emergencia Proyect (Emergency Information System in English) which allows people to send emergency messages to the population affected by a natural disaster even when there is no access to an Internet connection or mobile networks.

== Biography ==
Lara studied computer engineering at the Universidad Técnica Federico Santa María in Chile.

She designed a mobile phone application which consists on an information system which allows sending and receiving signals through smartphones in order to reach people living in places affected by a catastrophic emergency, providing useful information so that they know where to go. This app uses a high-frequency algorithm, which encodes the audio information and can be distributed over the radio waves, generating a bridge between the analog and digital world.

The original idea came from a devastating earthquake measuring 8.8 on the Richter scale that struck her country in 2010. After the event, Barbarita started to think about how she could contribute to solving the uncommunication problem through technology. The people she met depended on Internet or mobile network to communicate, but most of the networks had stopped working. Along the Chilean coast, 156 people died and 26 were missing due to the tsunami caused by the earthquake. One of the reasons for this loss was the non-existent alert to people from the responsible organizations such as ONEMI (National Organization for Emergencies of the Home Office in English).

As a child she was inspired by her father, who worked in the cryptography service of the Chilean Navy and motivated by the continuous tremors that characterize the Andean country, in 2015 the then computer engineering student Barbarita Lara founded the Emergency Information System (SiE) after receiving the invention patent applied for in 2017 by the INAPI (National Institute of Industrial Property).

She counted with the financial support of CORFO (Production Development Corporation in English) via the funding line SSAF-I for Engineering 2030, of the 3I: Instituto Internacional para la Innovación (International Institute for Innovation in English) and of the Royal Academy of Engineering to present her mobile application which sends alerts to the citizens in emergency situations and relies neither on Internet nor mobile networks.

In 2019 she received funds from the Impulsa Iniciar foundation in order to fly to Portugal to the WSA ceremony with the finance manager of SIE, María Soledad Quintana, in an attempt to increase the female participation in the event.

== Studies ==
- Computer Engineering at Universidad Técnica Federico Santa María, 2016
- Training Program "Leaders in Innovation Fellowships" from the Royal Academy of Engineering in the UK, 2016
- Innovation Certificate and Technological Transmission Universidad Técnica Federico Santa María + ING2030, 2017
- Training Program "Leaders in Innovation Fellowships" from the Royal Academy of Engineering in the UK, 2017

== Awards and recognition ==
- Recognized as "Important technological Entrepreneur in the V region" by Girls in Tech Chile + Ing2030.
- Award for Innovation “Software Fair XXIII March 2016", IT Department USM (Universidad Técnica Federico Santa María).
- Winner of the “MIT Technology Review: Innovators under 35 LATAM” Award, given by the oldest technology magazine in the world, which set the precedents of the future technologies.
- Young Leaders in 2017
- Finalist of the "Chilean of the Year" Award, winner in the category "Chilean Innovator" in 2018.
- Finalist of the World Summit Award Global Congress in 2018, which rewards the best companies with digital content and innovation.
