= South Pacific High =

Weather phenomenon off the Peru and northern Chile coasts

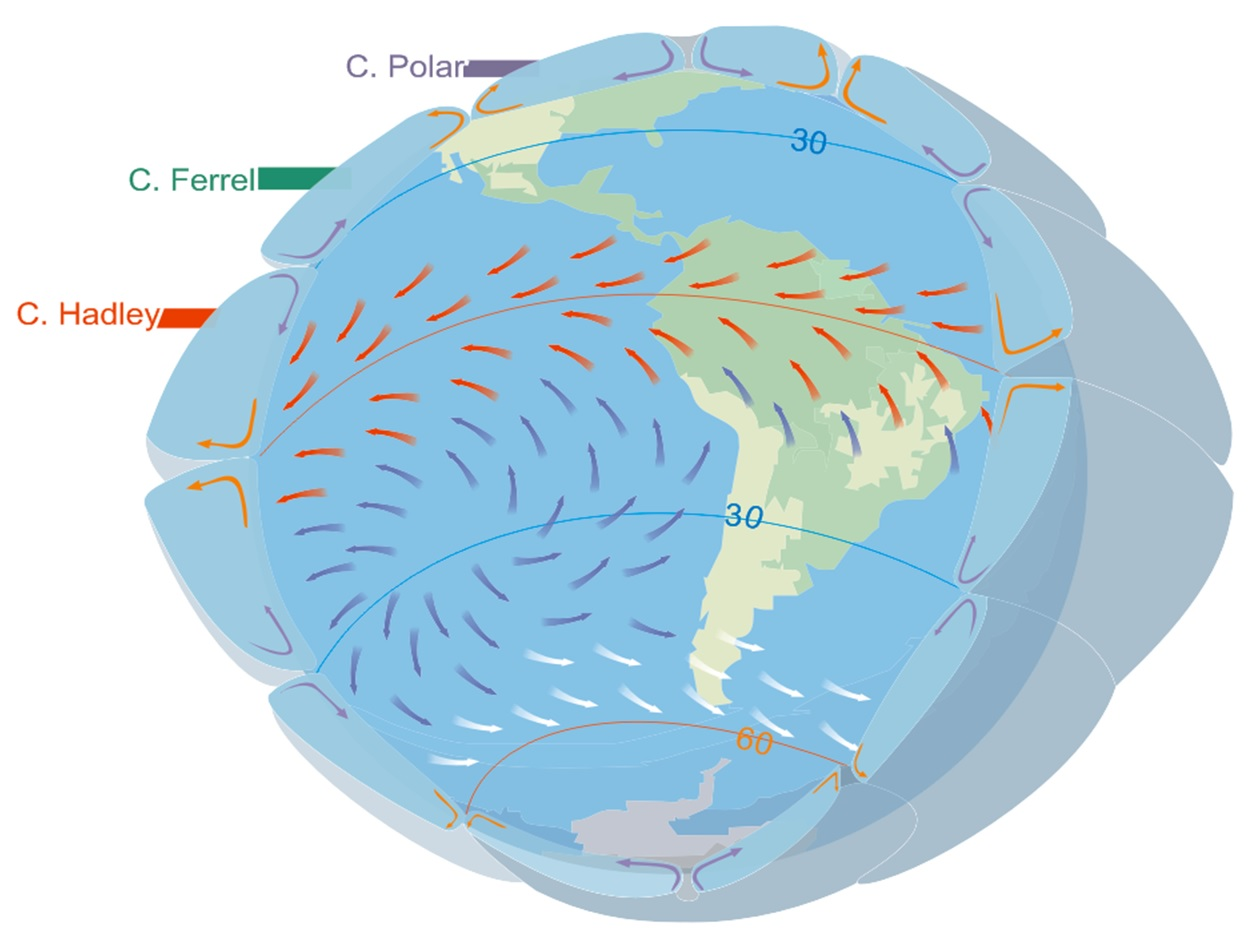
The general atmospheric circulation. Trade winds (red), westerlies (white) and the South Pacific High (blue)

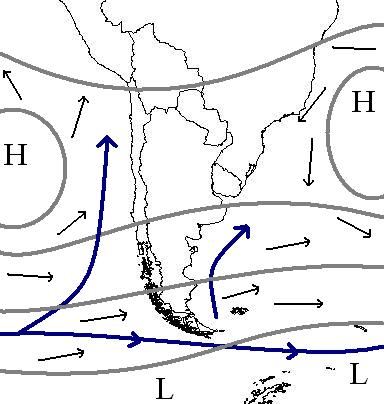
Sketch showing the normal location of the Pacific High west of Peru and Chile

The South Pacific High is a semi-permanent subtropical anticyclone located in the southeast Pacific Ocean. The area of high atmospheric pressure and the presence of the Humboldt Current in the underlying ocean make the west coast of Peru and northern Chile extremely arid. The Sechura and Atacama deserts, as the whole climate of Chile, are heavily influenced by this semi-permanent high-pressure area. This high-pressure system plays a major role in the El Niño–Southern Oscillation (ENSO), and it is also a major source of trade winds across the equatorial Pacific.

== See also ==
- Bolivian High
- North Pacific High
- Trade winds
- Humboldt Current
