= Norte Grande =

Northernmost natural region of Chile

Natural regions of Chile.

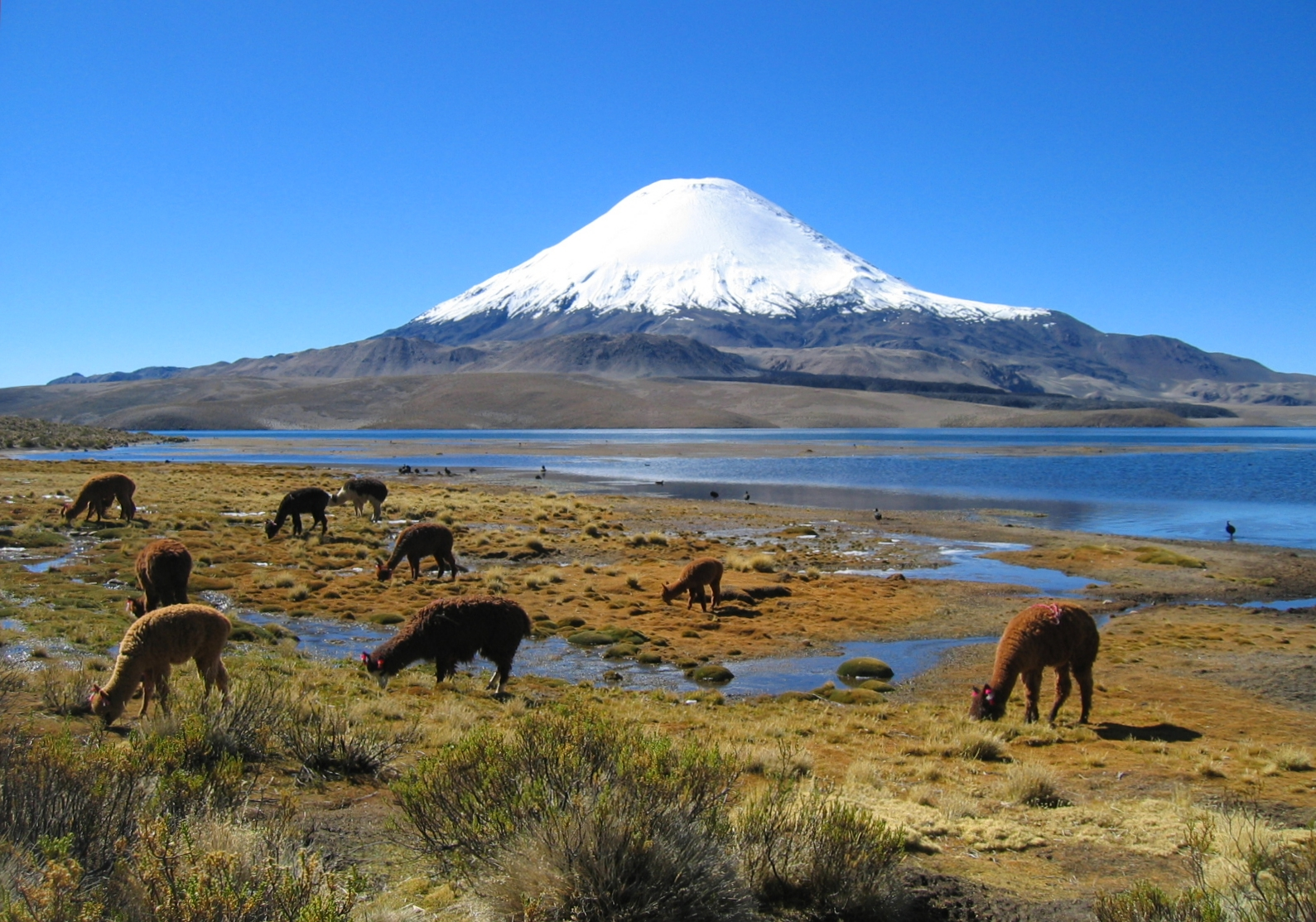
Lauca National Park

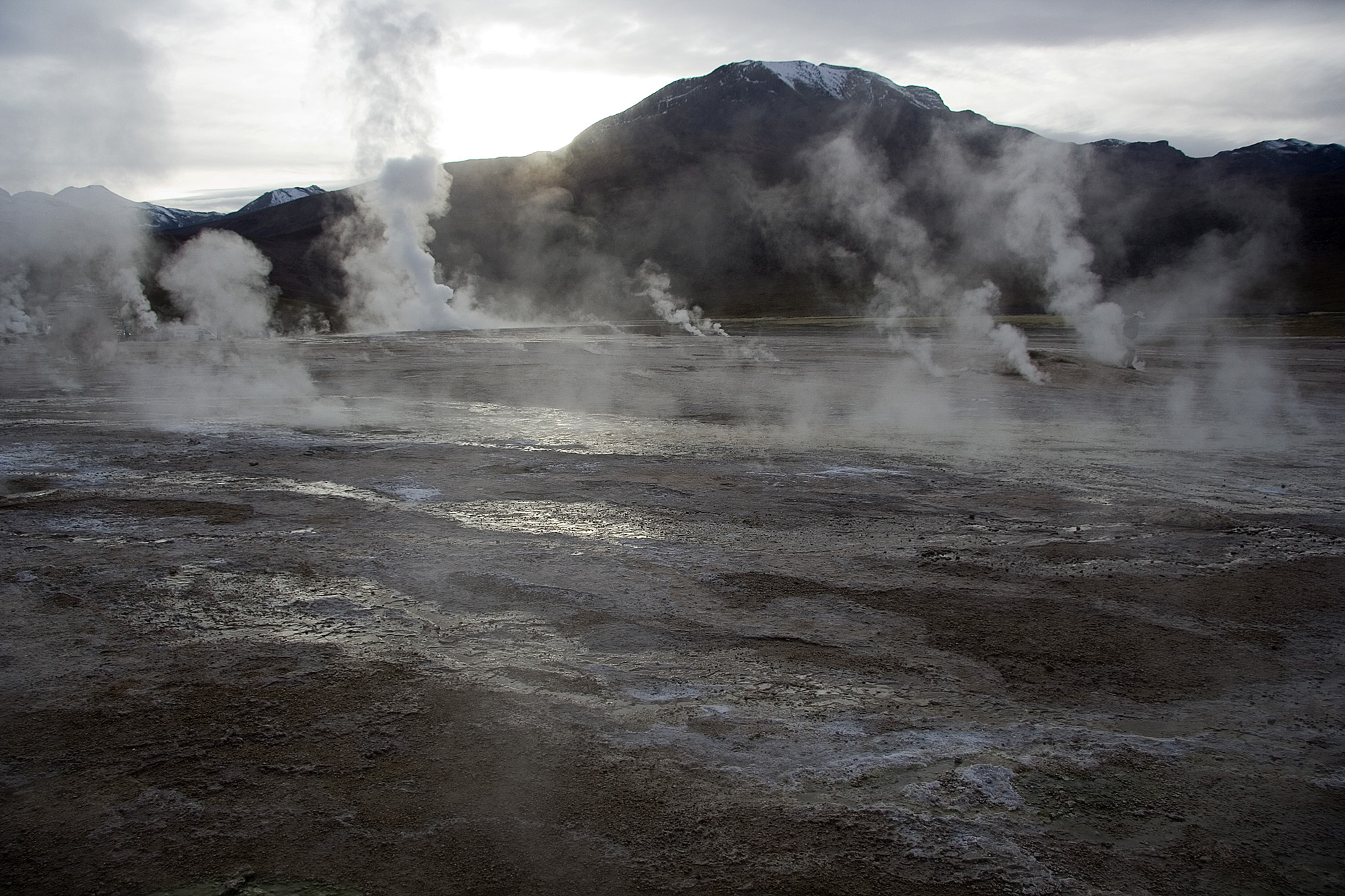
El Tatio Geyser Field, 4200 m alt.

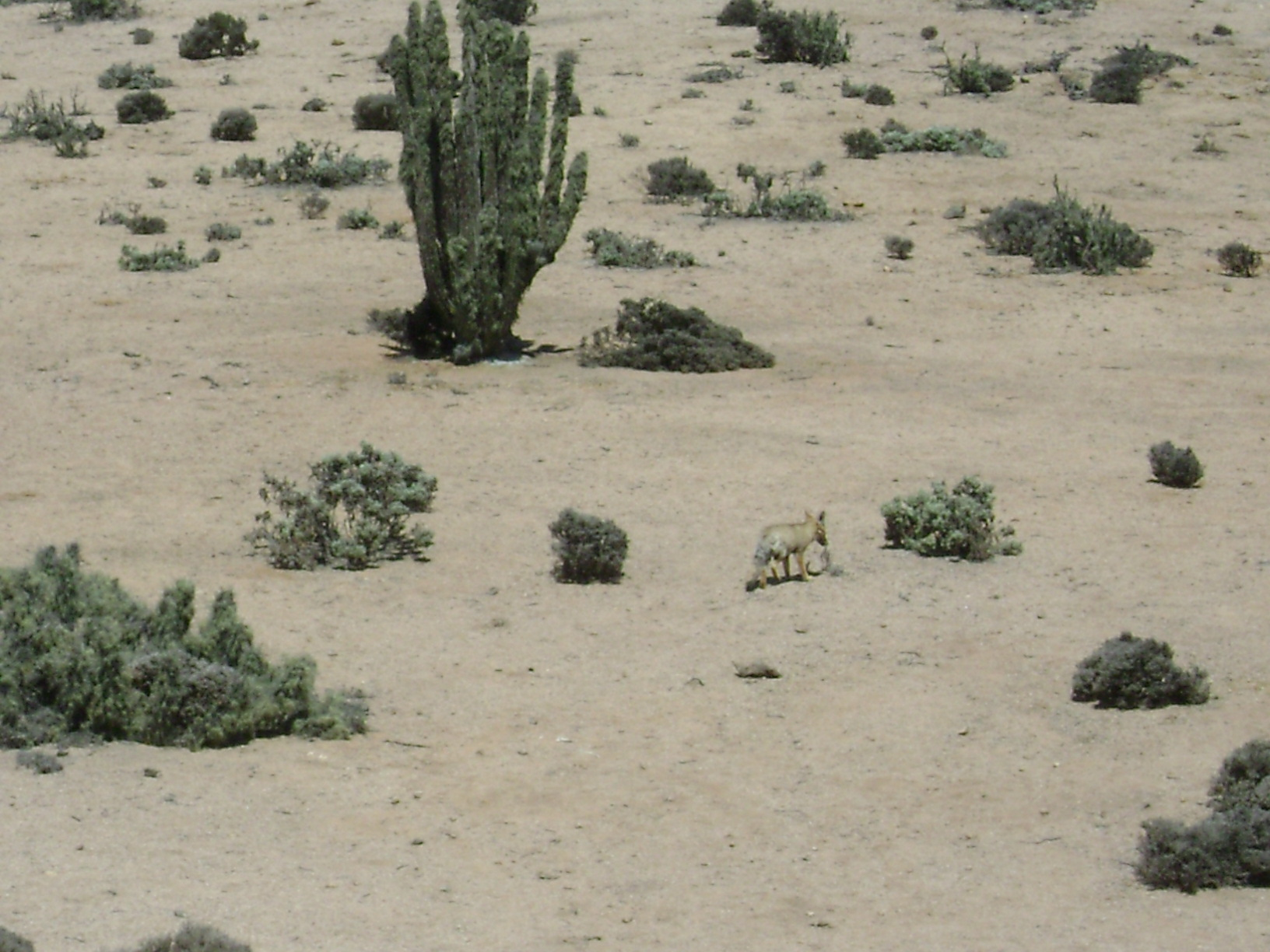
A chilla fox in Pan de Azúcar National Park in the coast of Atacama Desert.

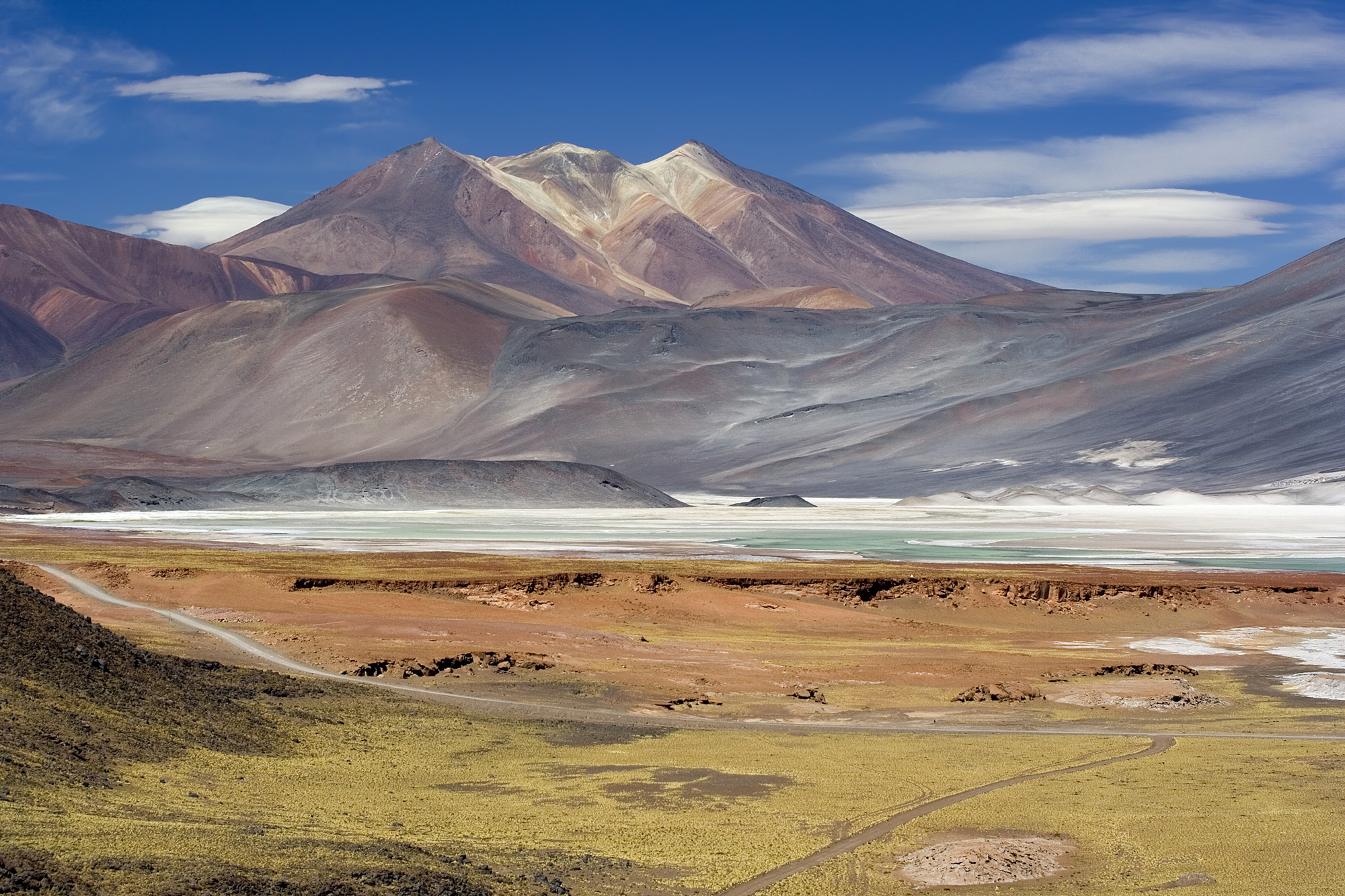
Salar de Talar

The Norte Grande (Big North, Far North, Great North) is one of the five natural regions into which CORFO divided continental Chile in 1950. It borders Peru to the north, the Pacific Ocean to the west, the Altiplano, Bolivia and Argentina to the east, and the Copiapó River to the south, beyond which lies the Norte Chico natural region.

== Geography ==
The Norte Grande, which extends from the Peruvian border to about 27° south latitude, a line roughly paralleled by the Copiapó river, is extremely arid. It contains the Atacama Desert, one of the driest areas in the world; in certain sections, this desert does not register any rainfall at all. Average monthly temperatures range at sea level between about 20.5 °C during the summer and about 14 °C during the winter. Most of the population lives in the coastal area, where the temperatures are more moderate and the humidity higher.

The desert region is an elevated arid plateau descending gradually from the Andes towards the coast, where it breaks down abruptly from elevations of 800 to 1500 ft. From the sea this plateau escarpment has the appearance of a range of flat topped hills closely following the coast line. This topography generates coastal microclimates because the fog that frequently forms over the cold ocean waters, as well as any low clouds, is trapped by the high bluffs. This airborne moisture condenses in the spines and leaves of the vegetation, droplets that fall to the ground and irrigate the plants' roots. The fog of this area is known locally as Camanchaca.

Beyond the coastal bluffs, there is an area of rolling hills that encompasses the driest desert land; this area ends to the east with the Andes towering over it. This region is rainless, barren and inhospitable, absolutely destitute of vegetation except in some small river valleys where irrigation is possible, and on the slopes of some of the snow-covered peaks where the water from the melting snows nourishes a scanty and coarse vegetation before it disappears in the thirsty sands. It is very rich in mineral and saline deposits, however. This area is broken by ranges of barren hills having the appearance of spurs from the Andes, and by irregular lateral ranges in the vicinity of the main cordillera enclosing elevated saline plateaus. Within the mountain ranges parallel to the main chain of the Andes, the main one is the Cordillera Domeyko and among the salt flats the greater is the Salar de Atacama.

The edges of the desert in some sections have subterranean aquifers that have permitted the development of forests made up mainly of tamarugos, spiny trees native to the area that grow to a height of about twenty-five meters. Most of those forests were cut down to fuel the fires of the many foundries established since colonial times to exploit the abundant deposits of copper, silver, and nitrate found in the area. The result was the creation of even drier surface conditions.

The eastern parts of this region lie within the higher ranges of the Andes and include a large district. This arid, bleak area is apparently a continuation southward of the great Altiplano, and is known as the Puna de Atacama. Its average elevation is estimated at 11,000 to 12,000 ft. A line of volcanoes crosses it from north to south, and extensive lava beds cover a considerable part of its surface. The chief summits being those of Licancabur, Acamarachi, Láscar, Miñiques, Pular, Socompa, Llullaillaco. Large shallow saline lakes are also characteristic features of this region. The area receives considerable rainfall during the summer months in what is commonly known as the Bolivian Winter, forming shallow lakes of mostly saline waters that are home to a number of bird species, including the flamingo species Andean, Chilean and James.

Contrary to the perception of monochrome barrenness, the landscape is colorful, with its hills and mountains of all shapes and sizes, each with a unique color and hue depending on its mineral composition, its distance from the observer, and the time of day.

Northward from the Atacama desert core area, some of the water from the altiplano trickles down the Andes in the form of narrow rivers, many of which form oases before being lost to evaporation or absorption into the desert sands, salt beds, and aquifers. However, some rivers do manage to reach into the Pacific, including the Loa River, whose U-shaped course across the desert makes it Chile's longest river. The water rights for one of the rivers, the Lauca River, remain a source of dispute between Bolivia and Chile. These narrow rivers have carved fertile valleys in which an exuberant vegetation creates a stark contrast to the bone-dry hills. In such areas, known locally as Quebradas, roads usually are built halfway up the arid elevations in order to maximize the intensive agricultural use of the irrigated land. They offer spectacular panoramic vistas, along with the harrowing experience of driving along the edges of cliffs. The Quebradas separate extensive plains called Pampas. The major of those is the Pampa del Tamarugal.

In the Norte Grande, the kinds of fruits that grow well in the arid tropics thrive, and all kinds of vegetables can be grown year-round, noticeably in Azapa Valley. However, the region's main economic foundation is its great mineral wealth. For instance, Chuquicamata and Escondida. The former is the world's largest open-pit copper mine and the latter is the copper open-pit mine with the largest production in the world. Since the early 1970s, the fishing industry has also developed enormously in the main ports of the area, most notably Arica, Iquique and Antofagasta.

== See also ==
- Natural regions of Chile
- Geography of Chile
