= Bolivian High =

Coordinates: 19°S 60°W

Map showing the varying positions the Bolivian High main have.

The Bolivian High is a tropical–subtropical semi-permanent centre of high atmospheric pressure typically found in Bolivia. Part of the high overlaps the Altiplano plateau in the Andes mountains. Modeling have yielded results that show that the Bolivian High is largely independent of the Altiplano, i.e. that it would exist even if the terrain under lacked mountains. It is the activity of this anticyclone which bring dry air via westerly winds from March to November over the Altiplano but then, when it moves south from December to February it allows the entrance of humid air from the easterlies causing the rainy season in the Altiplano. When strong easterlies displace the Bolivian High to the south the rainy season in the Altiplano (December–March) is more intense than usual.
