= Geography of Chile =

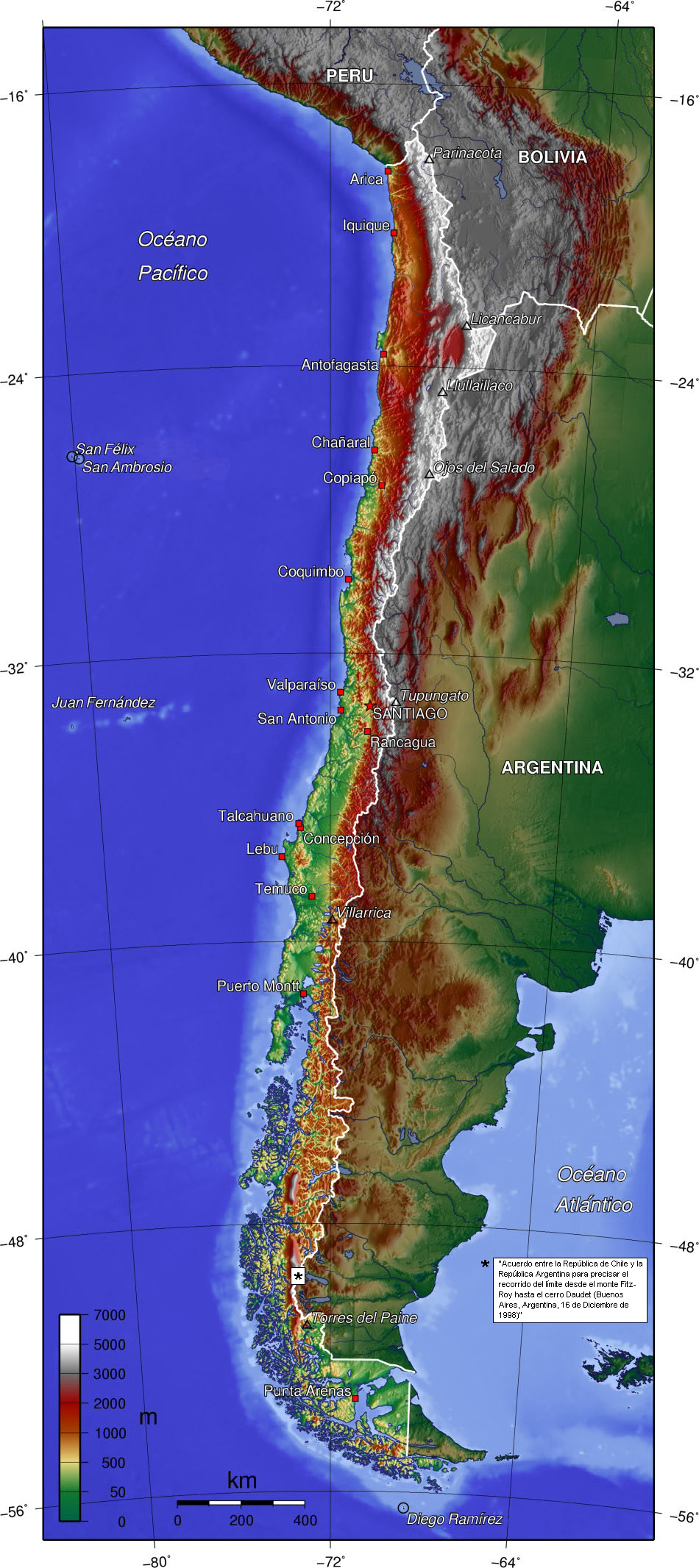
- Continent: South America
- Region: Southern Cone
- Coordinates: 30°00'S 70°00' W
- Area: Ranked 38th
  - Total: 756,102 km^{2} (291,933 sq mi)
  - Land: 98.4%
  - Water: 1.6%
- Coastline: 6,435 km (3,999 mi)
- Borders: Total land borders: 7,801 km (4,847 mi); Argentina: 6,691 km (4,158 mi); Bolivia: 942 km (585 mi); Peru: 168 km (104 mi)
- Highest point: Ojos del Salado in Andes of Atacama Region; 6,893 m (22,615 ft)
- Lowest point: Pacific Ocean, 0 m
- Longest river: Loa River, 440 km (273 mi)
- Largest lake: General Carrera Lake

The geography of Chile is extremely diverse, as the country extends from a latitude of 17° South to Cape Horn at 56°, and from the Pacific Ocean in the west to the Andes in the east. Chile is situated in southern South America, bordering the South Pacific Ocean and a small part of the South Atlantic Ocean. Chile's territorial shape is considered among the world's most unusual; from north to south, the country extends 4,270 km (2,653 mi), and yet it only averages 177 km (110 mi) in width. Chile reaches from the middle of South America's west coast straight down to the southern tip of the continent, where it curves slightly eastward. The Diego Ramírez Islands and Cape Horn, the southernmost points in the Americas where the Pacific and Atlantic oceans meet, are Chilean territory. Chile's northern neighbors are Peru and Bolivia, and its border with Argentina to the east, at 5,150 km (3,200 mi), is the world's first longest. The total land area is 756,102 km^{2} (291,933 mi^{2}). The very long coastline of 6,435 km (3,999 mi) gives Chile the 11th-largest exclusive economic zone of 3,648,532 km^{2} (1,408,706 mi^{2}).

== Physical geography ==
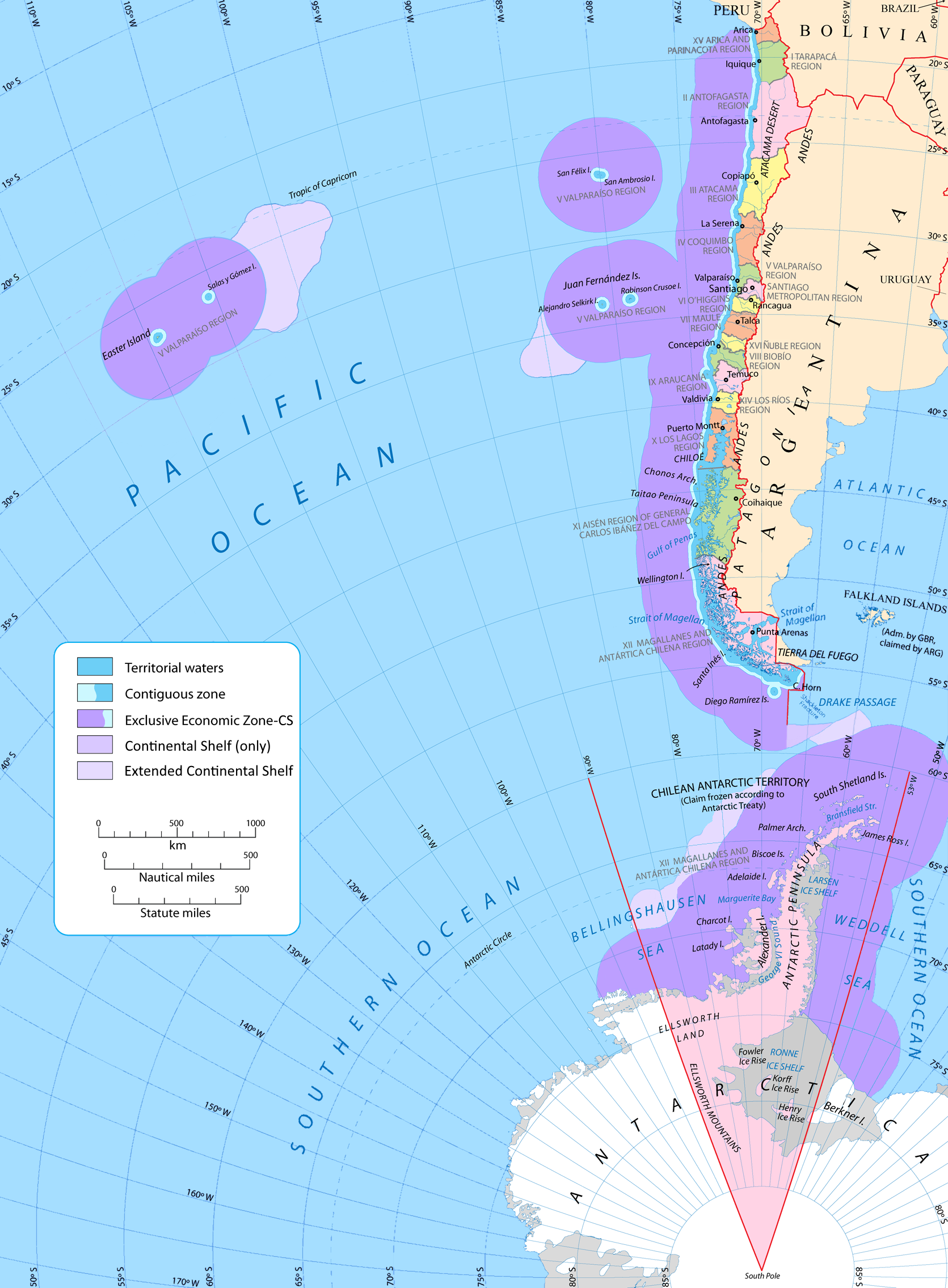
Map of Tricontinental Chile with possessions in Oceania (Easter Island), South America and the claim in Antarctica: Chilean Antarctic Territory, including the country's continental shelf

The northern two-thirds of Chile lie on top of the telluric Nazca Plate, which, moving eastward about ten centimeters a year, is forcing its way under the continental plate of South America. This movement has resulted in the formation of the Peru–Chile Trench. At its deepest point, the trench descends to over 8,000 metres (26,000 ft).

The same telluric displacements that created the Peru-Chile Trench make the country prone to earthquakes. Between 1904 and 2020, Chile was struck by 478 earthquakes with a magnitude of 6+ on the Richter scale (13 of these had a magnitude of 8+). The strongest of these, known as the Great Chilean Earthquake, occurred in Valdivia in 1960 with a magnitude of 9.5. In 2010, the 27F Earthquake occurred with a magnitude of 8.8, causing extreme damage to south-central Chile. It caused a tsunami that destroyed several fishing villages in the south and raised or lowered sections of the coast as much as two meters. There are 12 other Chilean earthquakes on record with a magnitude of 8+.

The convergence between the Earth's surface plates has also generated the Andes, a geologically young mountain range that in Chilean territory alone includes about 620 volcanoes, many of which are active.

Approximately 80 percent of Chile's terrain consists of mountainous formations. Many of these mountains and volcanoes are part of the Andes range, while non-Andean mountains constitute parts of transverse and coastal ranges. The transverse ranges, notably found in the near north and far north natural regions, extend in diverse configurations from the Andes to the ocean, shaping valleys oriented in an east–west direction. The coastal ranges are predominantly visible in the central region of the country, contributing to the formation of the Central Valley (Valle Central) between these ranges and the Andes. In the southernmost reaches, the Central Valley merges with the waters of the ocean. Here, the elevated sections of the coastal range facing the Andes transform into a multitude of islands, creating a complex network of channels and fjords that have posed navigational challenges to seafarers.

Much of Chile's coastline is rugged. The Humboldt Current, which originates northwest of the Antarctic Peninsula (which juts into the Bellingshausen Sea) and runs the full length of the Chilean coast, makes the water cold. During the summer months, the temperature of the water off Chile's beaches in the central part of the country stays below 15 °C (59 °F). A recent global remote sensing analysis suggested that there were 564 km^{2} of tidal flats in Chile, making it the 44th-ranked country in the world in terms of tidal flat area.

Chilean territory extends as far west as Polynesia. The best known of Chile's Pacific islands is Easter Island (Isla de Pascua, also known by its Polynesian name of Rapa Nui), with a population of 2,800 people. Located 3,600 km (2,237 mi) west of Chile's mainland port of Caldera, just below the Tropic of Capricorn, Easter Island provides Chile with a gateway to the Pacific. It is noted for its 867 statues (moai), which are huge (up to twenty meters high) and sculpted from volcanic stone. These statues are believed to have played an important role in Rapa Nui’s religion and culture.

The Juan Fernández Islands, located 587 km (365 mi) west of Valparaíso, are the locale of a small fishing settlement.

== Natural regions ==
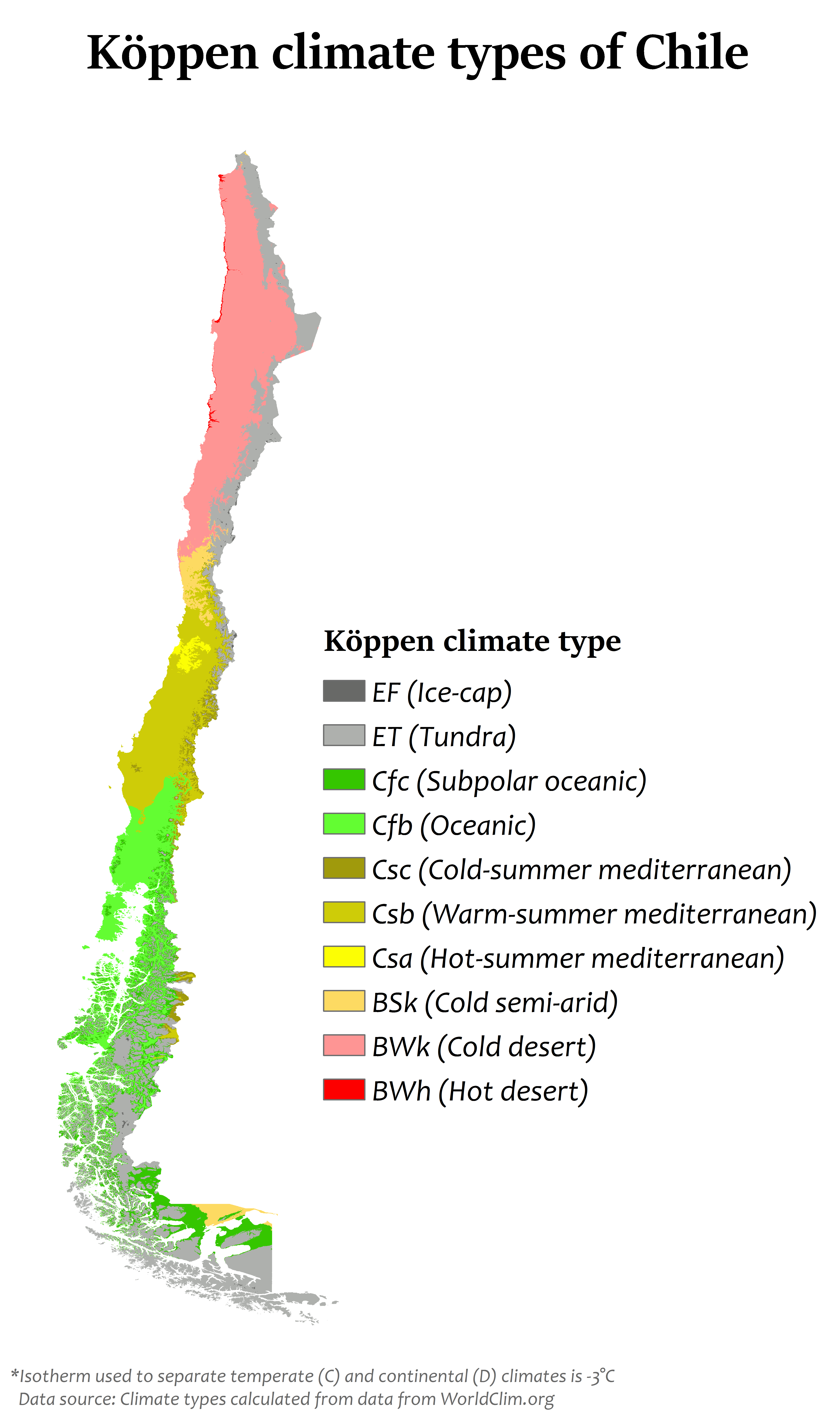
Köppen climate classification zones of Chile

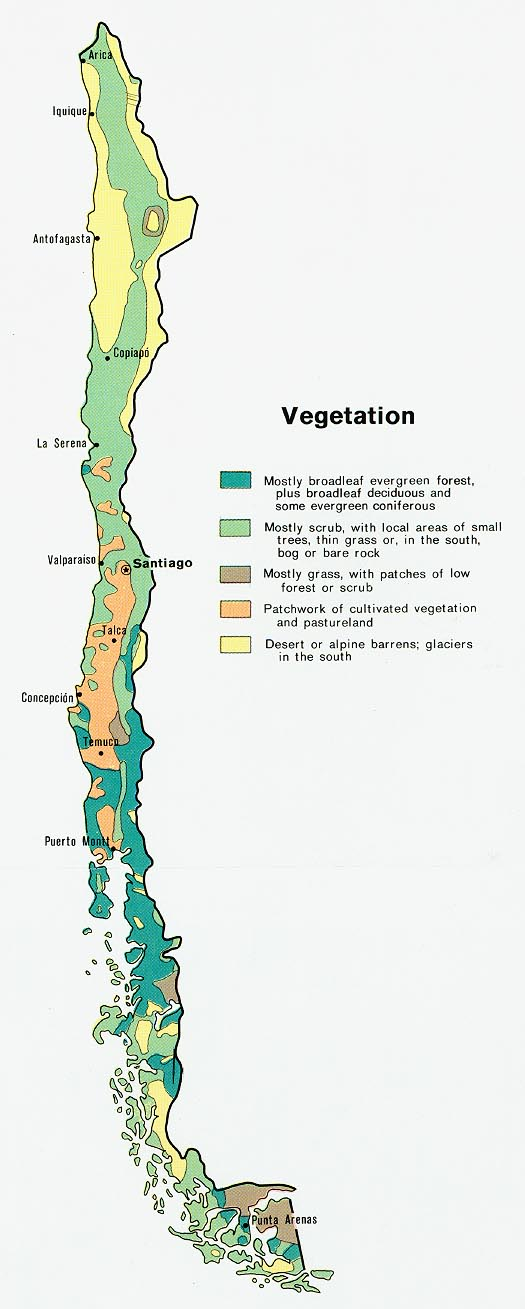
Vegetation map of Chile

Chile extends from about 625 km (388 mi) north of the Tropic of Capricorn to around 1,400 km (870 mi) north of the Antarctic Circle. Due to Chile's length, the country can be geographically divided into multiple sections based on distinct climatic zones. It is usually divided into five regions: the far north, the near north, central Chile, the south, and the far south. Each region has its own characteristic vegetation, fauna, climate, and distinct topography.

=== Far North ===
The far north (Norte Grande), which extends from the Peruvian border to about 27° south latitude, a line roughly parallel to the Copiapó River, is extremely arid. It mainly contains the Atacama Desert, one of the driest areas in the world. In certain areas, this desert does not register any rainfall at all. Geographically, the aridity can be explained by the following conditions:

- The desert is located on the leeward side of the Chilean Coast Range, so little moisture from the Pacific Ocean can reach the desert.
- The Andes are so high that they block convective clouds, which prevent precipitation formed above the Amazon Basin from entering the desert to the east.
- An inversion layer is created by the cold Humboldt Current and the South Pacific High.

Average monthly temperatures range at sea level between about 20.5 °C (68.9 °F) during the summer and about 14 °C (57.2 °F) during the winter. Most of the population lives in the coastal area, where the temperatures are more moderate and the humidity higher. Contrary to the image of monochrome barrenness that most people associate with deserts, the landscape is spectacular, with its crisscrossing hills and mountains of all shapes and sizes, each with a unique hue depending on its mineral composition, its distance from the observer, and the time of day.

In the far north, the land generally rises vertically from the ocean, sometimes to elevations well over 1,000 m (3,281 ft). The Cordillera Domeyko in the north runs along the coast parallel to the Andes. This topography generates coastal microclimates because the fog that frequently forms over the cold ocean waters, as well as any low clouds, is trapped by the high bluffs. This airborne moisture condenses in the spines and leaves of the vegetation, forming droplets that fall to the ground and irrigate the plants' roots. Beyond the coastal bluffs, there is an area of rolling hills that encompasses the driest desert land; this area ends to the east with the Andes towering over it. The edges of the desert in some sections have subterranean aquifers that have permitted the development of forests made up mainly of tamarugos, spiny trees native to the area that grow to a height of about twenty-five meters. Most of those forests were cut down to fuel the fires of the many foundries established since colonial times to exploit the abundant deposits of copper, silver, and nitrate found in the area. The result was the creation of even drier surface conditions.

The far north is the only part of the country in which there is a large section of the Andean plateau. During summer the area receives considerable rainfall in what is commonly known as the "Bolivian winter," forming shallow lakes of mostly saline waters (Salar de Llamara, Salar de Miraje, Salar de Atacama) that are home to a number of bird species, including the Chilean flamingo. Some of the water from the plateau trickles down the Andes in the form of narrow rivers, many of which form oases before being lost to evaporation or absorption into the desert sands, salt beds, and aquifers. However, some rivers do manage to reach the Pacific, including the Loa River, whose U-shaped course across the desert makes it Chile's longest river. The water rights for one of the rivers, the Lauca River, remain a source of dispute between Bolivia and Chile. These narrow rivers have carved fertile valleys in which exuberant vegetation creates a stark contrast to the bone-dry hills. In such areas, roads are usually built halfway up the arid elevations in order to maximize the intensive agricultural use of the irrigated land. They offer spectacular panoramic vistas, along with the harrowing experience of driving along the edges of cliffs.

In the far north, the kinds of fruits that grow well in the arid tropics thrive, and all kinds of vegetables can be grown year-round. However, the region's main economic foundation is its great mineral wealth. For instance, Chuquicamata, the world's largest open-pit copper mine, is located in the far north. Since the early 1970s, the fishing industry has also developed significantly in the main ports of the area, most notably Iquique and Antofagasta.

=== Near North ===
The near north (Norte Chico) extends from the Copiapó River to about 32° south latitude, or just north of Santiago. It is a semi-arid region whose central area receives an average of about 25 mm (0.98 in) of rain during each of the four winter months, with trace amounts the rest of the year. The near north is also subject to droughts. The temperatures are moderate, with an average of 18.5 °C (65.3 °F) during the summer and about 12 °C (53.6 °F) during the winter at sea level. The winter rains and the melting of the snow that accumulates on the Andes produce rivers whose flow varies with the seasons, but carry water year-round. Their deep Transverse Valleys provide broad areas for cattle raising and, most important, fruit growing, an activity that has developed greatly since the mid-1970s. Nearly all Chilean pisco is produced in the near north.

As in the far north, the coastal areas of the near north have a distinct microclimate. In those sections where the airborne moisture of the sea is trapped by high bluffs overlooking the ocean, temperate rain forests develop as the vegetation precipitates the vapor in the form of a misty rain. Because the river valleys provide breaks in the coastal elevations, maritime moisture can penetrate inland and further moderate the generally arid climate in those valleys. The higher elevations in the interior sections are covered with shrubs and cacti of various kinds.

=== Central Chile ===
Central Chile (Chile Central), home to a majority of the population, includes the three largest metropolitan areas—Santiago, Valparaíso, and Concepción. It extends from about 32° south latitude to about 37° south latitude. The climate is of the temperate Mediterranean type, with the amount of rainfall increasing considerably and progressively from north to south. In the Santiago area, the average monthly temperatures are about 19.5 °C (67.1 °F) in the summer months of January and February and 7.5 °C (45.5 °F) in the winter months of June and July; the average monthly precipitation is no more than a trace in January and February and 69.7 mm (3 in) in June and July. In Concepción, by contrast, the average monthly temperatures are somewhat lower in the summer at 17.6 °C (63.7 °F) but higher in the winter at 9.3 °C (48.7 °F), and the amount of rain is much greater: in the summer, Concepción receives an average of 0.8 inches (20 mm) of rain per month; in June and July, the city is pounded by an average of 10 inches (253 mm) per month. The numerous rivers greatly increase their flow as a result of the winter rains and the spring melting of the Andean snows, and they contract considerably in the summer. The combination of abundant snow in the Andes and relatively moderate winter temperatures creates excellent conditions for Alpine skiing.

The topography of central Chile includes a coastal range of mountains running parallel to the Andes. Lying between the two mountain ranges is the Central Valley, which contains some of the richest agricultural land in the country, especially in its northern portion. The area just north and south of Santiago is a large producer of fruits, including the grapes from which the best Chilean wines are made. Exports of fresh fruit began to rise dramatically in the mid-1970s because Chilean growers had the advantage of being able to reach markets in the Northern Hemisphere during winter in that part of the world. Most of these exports, such as grapes, apples, and peaches, go by refrigerator ships, while some, such as berries, go by air freight.

The southern portion of central Chile contains a mixture of some high-quality agricultural lands, many of which were originally covered with old-growth forests. They were cleared for agriculture but were soon exhausted of their organic matter and left to erode. Large tracts of this worn-out land, many of them on hilly terrain, have been reforested for the lumber, especially for the cellulose and paper industries. New investments during the 1980s in these industries transformed the rural economy of the region. The pre-Andean highlands and some of the taller and more massive mountains in the coastal range (principally the Cordillera de Nahuelbuta) still contain large tracts of old-growth forests of remarkable beauty, some of which have been set aside as national parks. Between the coastal mountains and the ocean, many areas of central Chile contain stretches of land that are lower than the Central Valley and are generally quite flat. The longest beaches can be found in such sections.

=== South ===
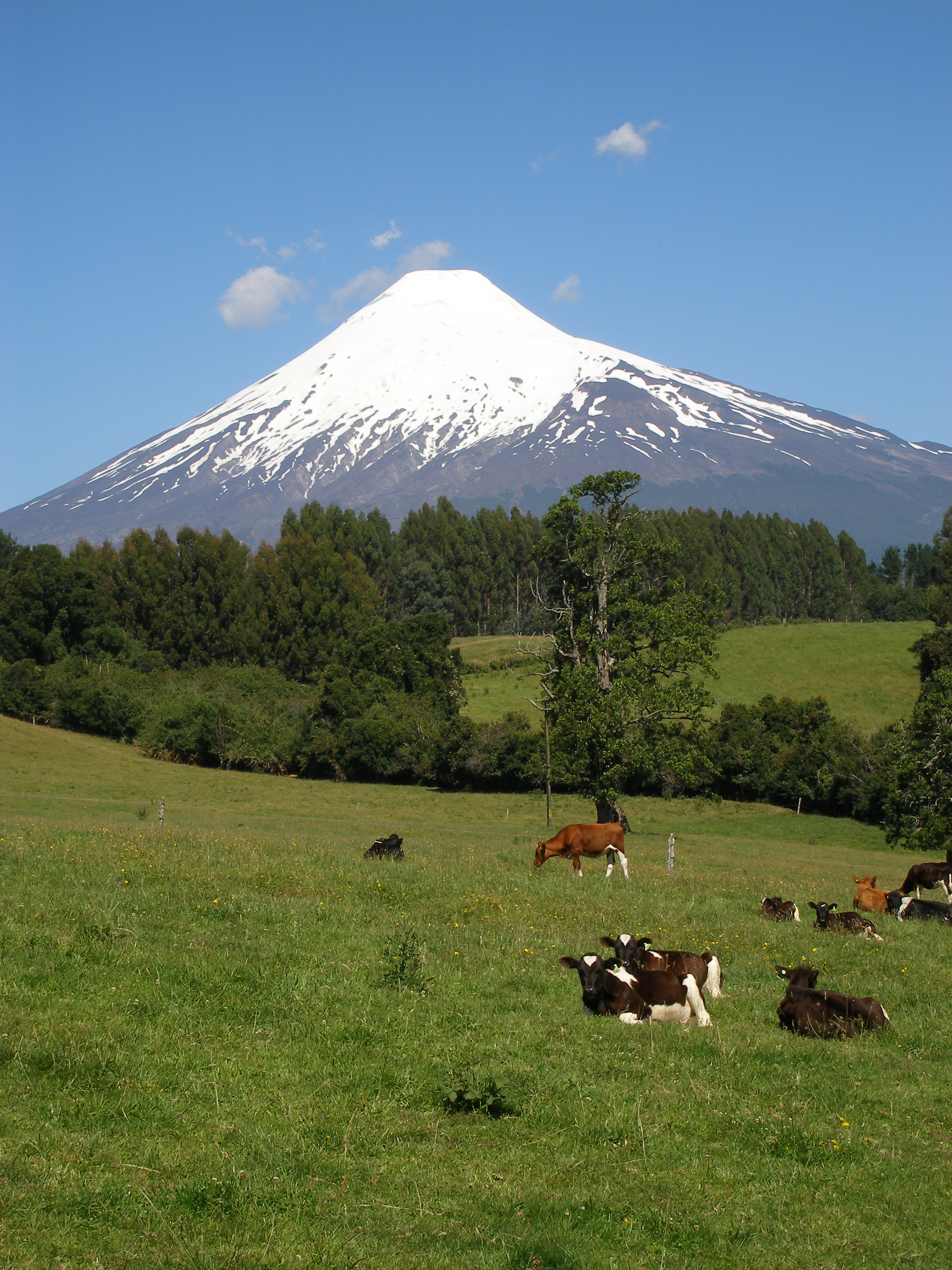
Cattle grazing near the Llanquihue Lake. The Osorno Volcano is in the background

Although many lakes can be found in the Andean and coastal regions of central Chile, the south (Sur de Chile) is definitely the country's most lacustrine area. Southern Chile stretches from below the Bío-Bío River at about 37° south latitude to Chacao Channel at about 42° south latitude. In this lake district of Chile, the valley between the Andes and the coastal range is closer to sea level, and the hundreds of rivers that descend from the Andes form lakes, some quite large, as they reach the lower elevations. They drain into the ocean through other rivers, some of which (principally the Calle-Calle River, which flows by the city of Valdivia) are the only ones in the country that are navigable for any stretch. The Central Valley's southernmost portion is submerged in the ocean and forms the Gulf of Ancud. Isla de Chiloé, with its rolling hills, is the last important elevation of the coastal range of mountains.

The south is one of the rainiest areas in the world. One of the wettest spots in the region is Valdivia, with an annual rainfall of 2,535.4 mm (99.8 in). The summer months of January and February are the driest, with a monthly average precipitation of 67 mm (2.6 in). The winter months of June and July each produce, on average, a deluge of 410.6 mm (16.2 in). Temperatures in the area are moderate. In Valdivia, the two summer months average 16.7 °C (62.1 °F), whereas the winter months average 7.9 °C (46.2 °F).

The snow-covered Andes form a constant backdrop to vistas of clear blue or even turquoise waters, as at Todos los Santos Lake. The rivers that descend from the Andes rush over volcanic rocks, forming numerous white-water sections and waterfalls. The vegetation, including many ferns in the shady areas, is a lush green. Some sections still consist of old-growth forests, and in all seasons, but especially in the spring and summer, there are considerable amounts of wildflowers and flowering trees. The pastures in the northernmost section, around Osorno, are well suited for raising cattle; milk, cheese, and butter are important products of that area. All kinds of berries grow in the region, some of which are exported, and freshwater farming of various species of trout and salmon has developed, with cultivators taking advantage of the abundant supply of clear running water. The lumber industry is also important. A number of tourists, mainly Chileans and Argentines, visit the area during the summer.

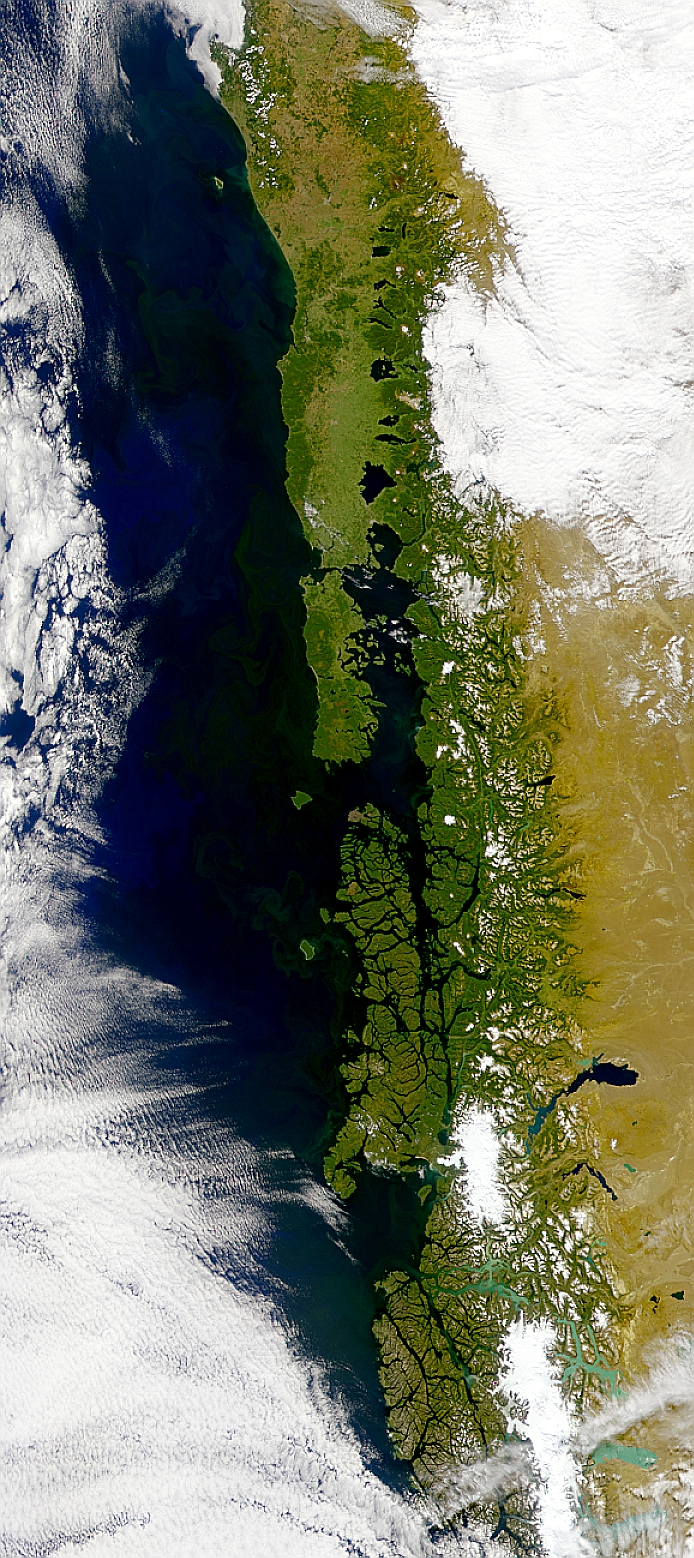
As seen in this SeaWiFS image, Chile's southern coast is broken into many islands, fjords, channels and twisting peninsulas

Many of Chile's distinctive animal species have been decimated as they have been pushed farther and farther into the remaining wilderness areas by human occupation of the land. This is the case with the huemul, a large deer, and the Chilean condor, the largest bird of its kind; both animals are on the national coat of arms. The remaining Chilean cougars, which are larger than the ones in California, have been driven to isolated national parks in the south by farmers who continue to hunt them because they kill sheep and goats.

=== Far South ===
In the far south (Chile Austral), which extends from approximately 42° south latitude to Cape Horn, lie the Andes and the South Pacific. In the northern part of the far south, there is still plenty of rainfall. The summer months average 206.1 mm (8 in), whereas the winter months average 300 mm (12 in). The temperatures at sea level in Puerto Aisén average 13.6 °C (56.5 °F) in the summer months and 4.7 °C (40.5 °F) in the winter months. The area generally is chilly and wet and houses a combination of channels, fjords, snow-capped mountains, and islands of all shapes and sizes within a narrow space. The southern part of the far south includes the city of Punta Arenas, which, with about 125,000 inhabitants, is the southernmost city in Chile. Punta Arenas receives much less precipitation than other parts of Zone Austral; its annual total is only 438.5 mm (17 in), or slightly more than what Valdivia receives in the month of June alone. This precipitation is distributed more or less evenly throughout the year, with the two main summer months receiving a monthly average of 31 mm (1.2 in) and the winter months 38.9 mm (1.53 in), some of it in the form of snow. Temperatures are colder than in the rest of the country. The summer months average 11.1 °C (52.0 °F), and the winter months average 2.5 °C (36.5 °F). The virtually constant wind from the South Pacific Ocean makes the air feel significantly colder.

The far south contains large expanses of pastures that are often used for raising sheep, even though overgrazing is an issue in some areas. The area's other main economic activity is oil and natural gas extraction from the areas around the Strait of Magellan. This strait is one of the world's important sea-lanes because it unites the Atlantic and Pacific oceans through a channel that avoids the rough open waters off Cape Horn. The channel is perilous, however, and Chilean pilots guide all vessels through it.

== Area and boundaries ==
=== Area ===
Total: 756,102 km^{2} (291,933 sq mi)
Land: 743,812 km^{2} (287,187 sq mi)
Water: 12,290 km^{2} (4,745 sq mi)
Note: includes Easter Island (Isla de Pascua) and Isla Sala y Gómez
Country rank: 37th

This does not include the Chilean claims to Antarctica, which overlap with Argentinian and British claims. All Antarctic claims are frozen under the Antarctic treaty.

Area — comparative:
Canada: roughly half the size of Quebec
US: slightly smaller than twice the size of Montana
Australia: slightly smaller than New South Wales

=== Land boundaries ===
Total: 7,801 km (4,847 mi)
Border Countries: Argentina 6,691 km (4,158 mi), Bolivia 942 km (585 mi), Peru 168 km (104 mi)

Coastline: 6,435 km (3,999 mi)

Maritime claims:
Territorial sea: 12 nmi (22.2 km; 13.8 mi)
Contiguous zone: 24 nmi (44.4 km; 27.6 mi)
Exclusive economic zone: 3,648,532 km^{2} (1,408,706 mi^{2})
Continental shelf: 200–350 nmi (370.4–648.2 km; 230.2–402.8 mi)

== Extremes ==
=== Latitude and longitude ===
- North: tripartite border with Bolivia and Peru
- Southernmost point can be either:
  - Mainland: Águila Islet, Diego Ramírez Islands
  - Including Antártica: The South Pole
- Westernmost point: Motu Nui, off Easter Island
- Easternmost point can be either:
  - Mainland: Nueva Island
  - Including Antártica: the 53rd meridian west over Antarctica

=== Elevation ===
- highest point: Ojos del Salado 6,893 m (22,615 ft)
- lowest point: Pacific Ocean 0 m (0 ft)

== Resources and land use ==
Natural resources: copper, timber, iron ore, nitrates, precious metals, molybdenum, hydropower, thermal power, nutrient-rich ocean currents

Land use:
arable land: 1.80%
permanent crops: 0.61%
other: 97.59% (2012)

Irrigated land: 11,990 km^{2} (4,629 sq mi) (2003)

Total renewable water resources: 922 km^{3} (2011)

Freshwater withdrawal (domestic/industrial/agricultural):
total: 26.67 km^{3}/yr (4%/10%/86%)
per capital: 1,603 m^{3}/yr (2007)

== Environmental concerns ==
Natural hazards: severe earthquakes; active volcanism; tsunamis

Environment - current issues: widespread deforestation, mining; air pollution from industrial and vehicle emissions; water pollution from raw sewage

Environment - international agreements:

- party to: Antarctic Treaty, Antarctic-Environmental Protocol, Biodiversity, Climate Change, Desertification, Endangered Species, Environmental Modification, Hazardous Wastes, Law of the Sea, Marine Dumping, Nuclear Test Ban, Ozone Layer Protection, Ship Pollution (MARPOL 73/78), Wetlands, Whaling
- signed, but not ratified: Climate Change-Kyoto Protocol

Geography - note: strategic location relative to sea lanes between Atlantic and Pacific Oceans (Strait of Magellan, Beagle Channel, Drake Passage); the Atacama Desert is one of the world's driest regions

== Population geography ==
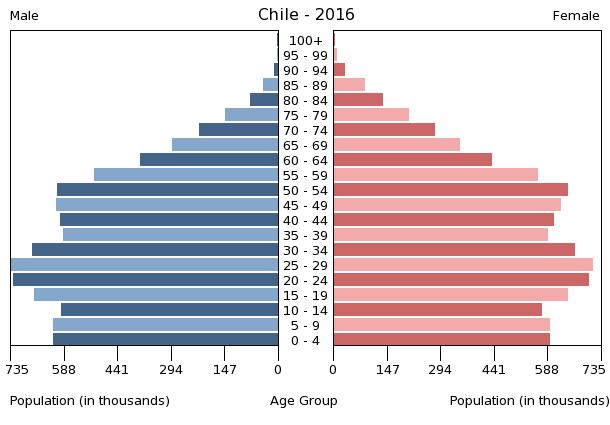
Population pyramid of Chile 2016

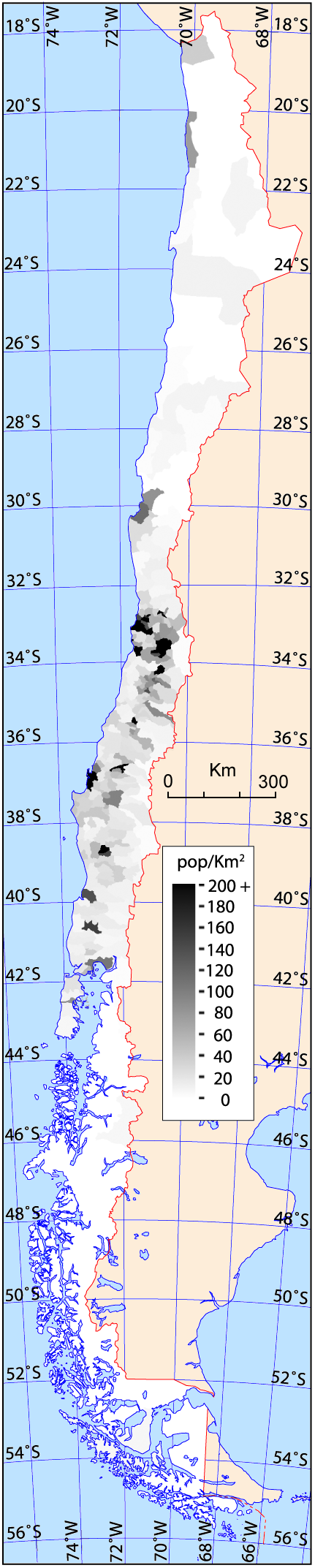
Chile Population Density

=== Urban population ===
The distribution of population is very condensed around the capital, Santiago, where approximately 90% of the people live. The cities of Valparaiso and Concepcion are the next most populated cities, in that order. The population is 87.6% urbanized. In 2009, 12,037,290 people living in urban parts of Chile actually had functioning facilities in their homes, while 403,276 people did not have proper facilities in their dwellings. 100% of the urban population has some form of access to sanitation facilities, while 90.9% of rural people have these facilities available. This is much higher than the rural average for the world, which is 50.5% access to sanitation facilities.

The United Nations Department of Economic and Social Affairs note the average annual rate of population change from 2015 to 2017 was 1.022. The UN data also show live births per woman (2015–2017) averaging 1.765 and a combined infant mortality rate for both sexes at 6.258 per 1,000 live births.

==== Natural hazards ====
Natural disasters are a significant cause of Chilean emigration. Earthquakes are common in Chile due to the country's location on the Nazca Plate and South American Plate. Chile has experienced some of the most powerful earthquakes in history with the Valdivia Earthquake in 1960 at 9.5 on the Richter scale and the Maule Earthquake at 8.8 in 2010. The top three countries to which Chilean emigrants are moving are Argentina, Peru, and the United States.

Chile's natural hazards include earthquakes, volcanic eruptions, and tsunamis. The natural hazards are attributed to Chile's location along the Ring of Fire. Severe earthquakes can trigger tsunamis in this country, which has 6,435 km of coastline. There are also more than three-dozen active volcanoes in Chile, with the most active being Llaima Volcano in the north Chilean Andes.

== Urban geography ==
The three most populated cities in Chile are Santiago, Valparaíso, and Concepción. The populations of these cities are: Santiago at 6,680,000, Valparaíso at 967,000, and Concepción at 857,000. Santiago is located in central Chile, with the Mapocho River running through the city. Valparaíso is located on the coast, approximately 116 km northwest of Santiago. Concepción is also a coastal city, situated near the mouth of the Biobío River.

=== Origins ===
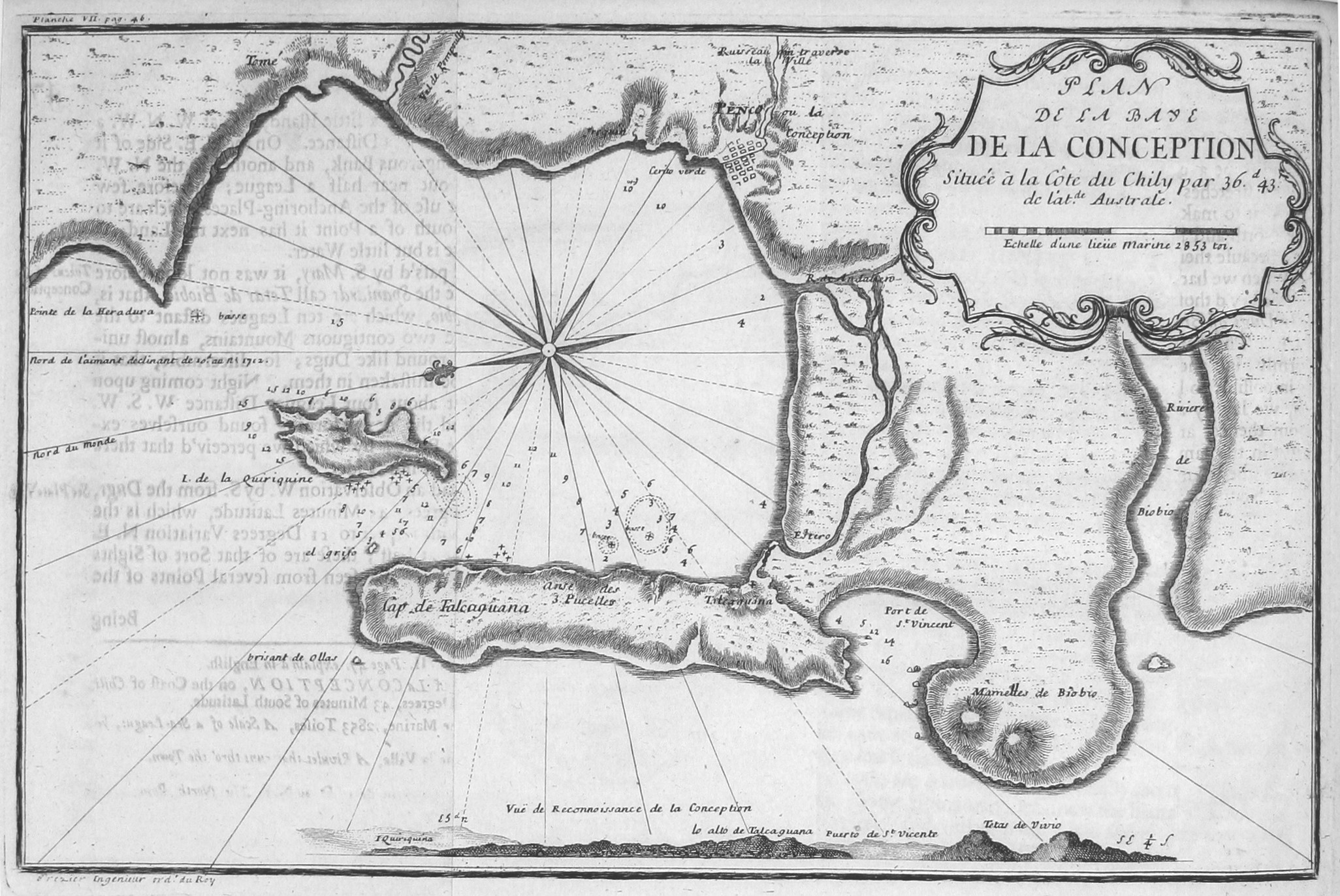
Concepción early 1700s

Industrial cities, such as Concepción and Talcahuano, began as colonial centers in the 1600s. Most of the large cities in Chile began as settlement locations for Spanish colonists, who lived in homes constructed from adobe. They have grown to be the densely populated urban conurbations for which they are known today.

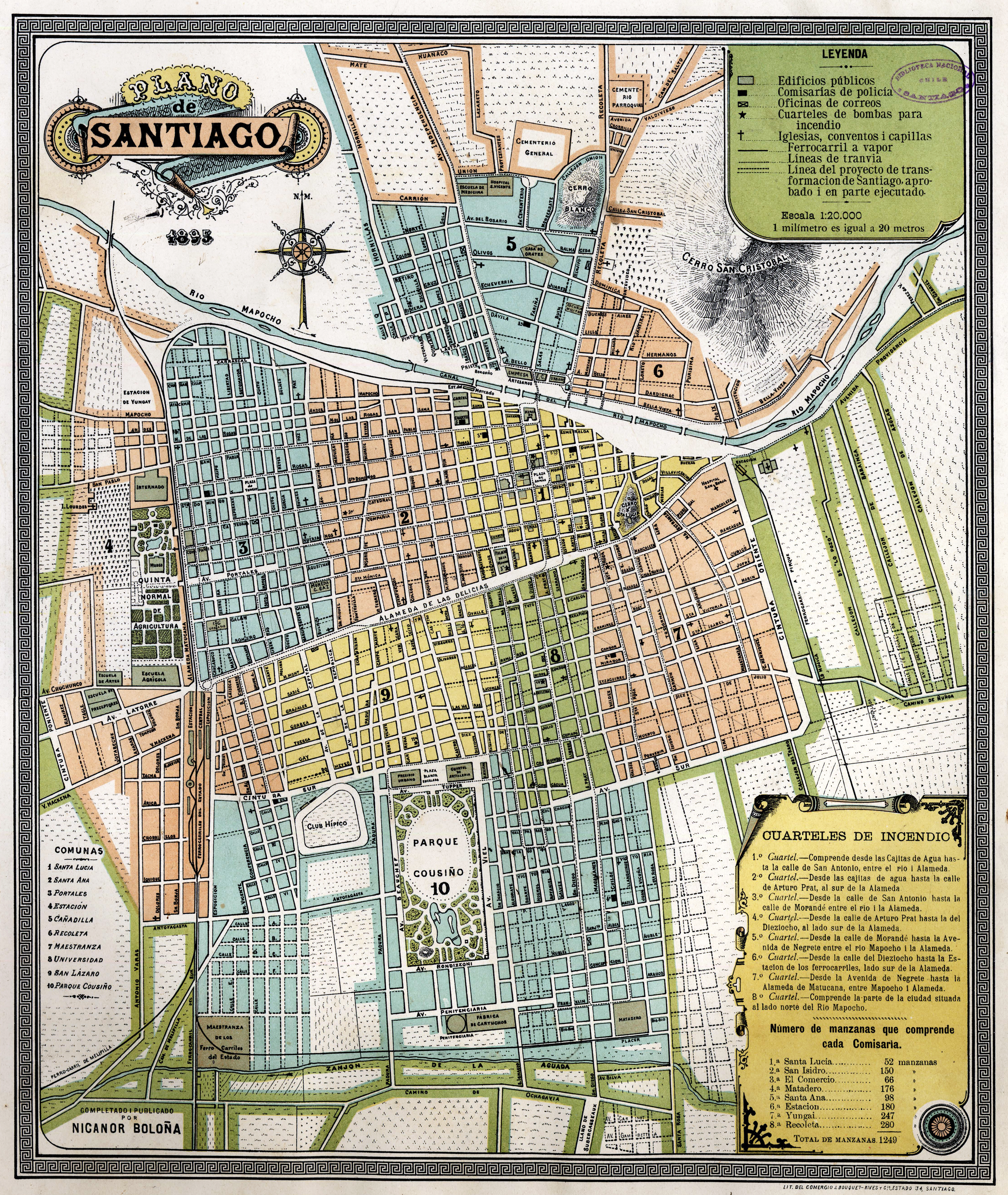
Santiago 1895

=== Gentrification ===
Gentrification is occurring in the municipal district of Santiago, effecting low-income residents. Housing availability has decreased by 50% for residents and rent for new apartments has increased, altering the average income of that location. The Floor Area Ratio, implemented by the state has resulted in highly dense and smaller living spaces.

== Cultural geography ==
=== Racialized landscapes in Chile ===
Due to Chile's high population density in urban cities like Santiago, housing developments have increasingly expanded vertically. These high-rises are predominantly occupied by foreign migrants.

=== Religious landscapes and sacred places ===
In Chile, there are a number of pilgrimage and devotional sites dedicated to Catholic saints or popular religious figures associated with local cults. These include the Church of Our Lady of Andacollo, the Church of Our Lady of Mount Carmel in Tirana, and the Church of the Immaculate Conception of Lo Vásquez.

==== La Virgen de Andacollo ====
While there are several tales of her origin and variations on her name, the Virgin Andacollo is honored on the first Sunday of every month in the plaza of Andacollo, Chile. The Virgin Andacollo is the Patron Saint of miners, believed to heal the sick and rescue those lost in the mines. On the first Sunday of October, the town of Andacollo celebrates their saint with La Fiesta Chico. Thousands of pilgrims come to the northern Chilean town each December for La Fiesta Grande. This event lasts from December 23 to 27. This celebration attracts as many as 500,000 people annually.

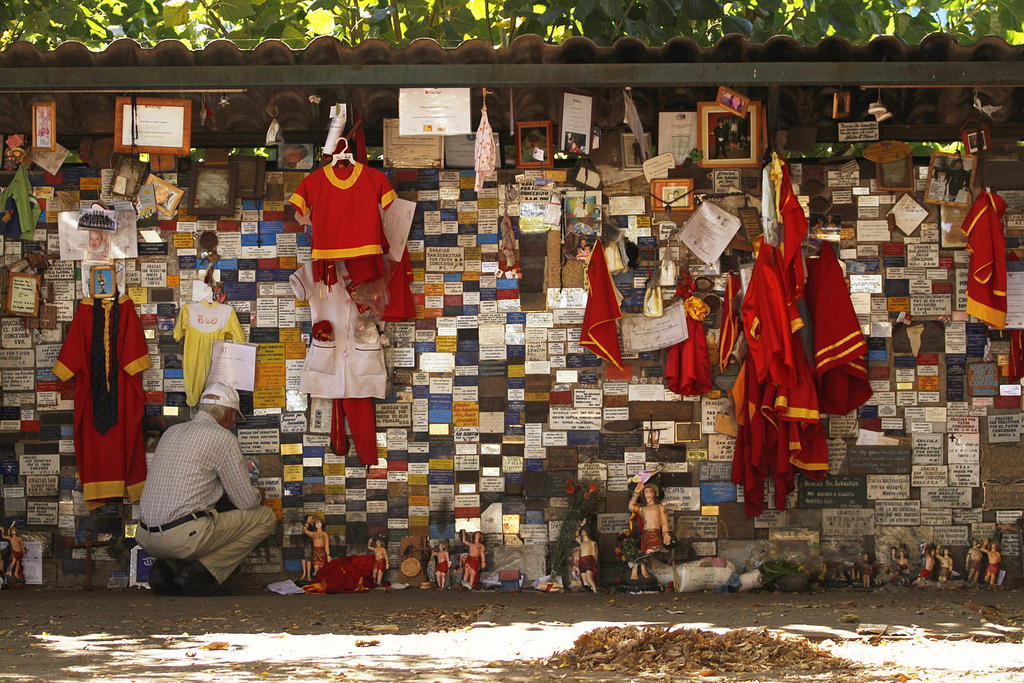
Animita in Chile

==== Animitas ====
It is not uncommon to come across roadside shrines in Chile. These shrines are called Animitas, and they are particularly common along rural highways or in lower-income towns. The shrines can be devoted to saints or to individuals who died tragically. These animitas mark the spot where the body and soul were believed to have separated, and where the soul might linger.

==== Churches of Chiloé ====
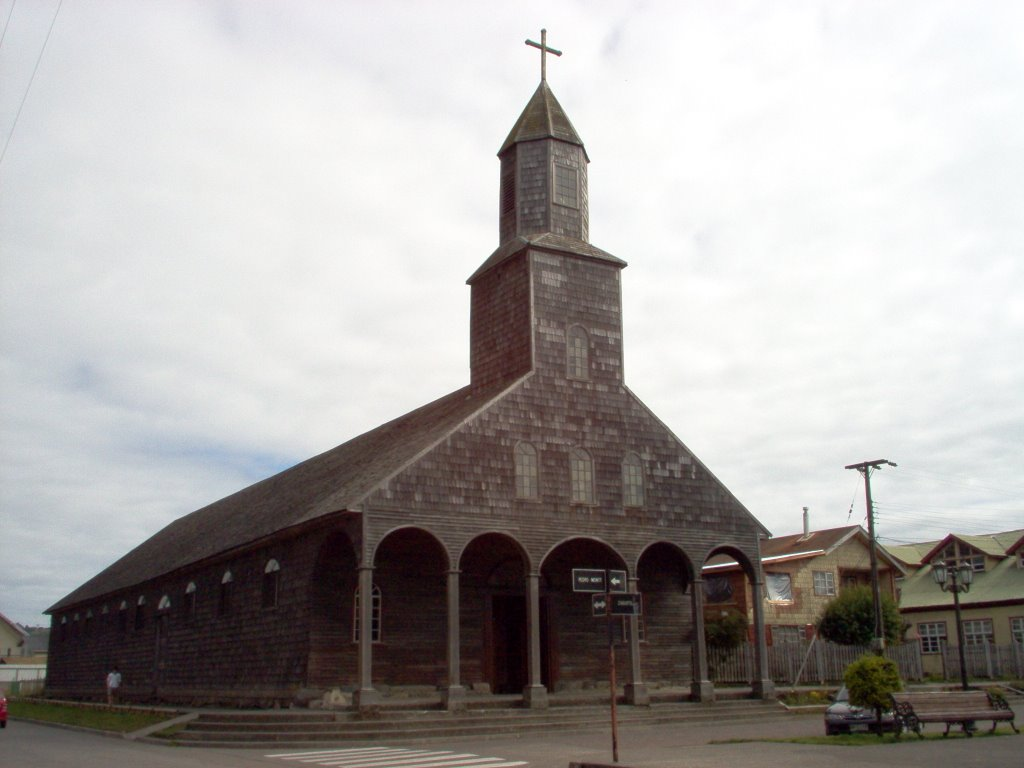
Iglesia de Achao

The Chiloé Archipelago is located in southern Chile and is home to the Churches of Chiloé. These churches date back to the early 17th century. Their history began when the first Jesuits arrived in Chile. There are more than 60 churches, 16 of which are recognized as World Heritage Sites by UNESCO and designated as national monuments in Chile. The Achao church is the oldest church that still stands and was built entirely without the use of nails.

== Political geography ==
=== Border disputes with Bolivia ===
Chile has long been in conflict with Bolivia over coastal and land sovereignty. The War of the Pacific was fought between Chile, Bolivia, and Peru in the late 1800s. The latter two had rich nitrate deposits. However, Peru established a monopoly over its deposits, and Bolivia applied export tariffs to Chile. After the war, Chile gained 120,000 km^{2} of land that included Antofagasta on the coastline of Bolivia. This has left Bolivia landlocked since 1904. Bolivians still fight for coastal and territorial sovereignty. Evo Morales, the former president of Bolivia, has argued that Bolivia's landlocked status has made the country endure great "historical injustice". Morales has also argued that were Chile to return Antofagasta, it would have no significant effect on their country. The land Bolivia lost to Chile more than a century ago is now home to some of the largest copper mines in the world. Chile has no intention of ceding any land to Bolivia, but is very open to coastal access negotiations.

In October 2018, the International Court of Justice ruled against Bolivia in its dispute with Chile. The court ruled that Chile did not have to discuss granting Bolivia sea access.

=== Border disputes with Peru ===
There have been continuous disputes between Chile and Peru since the 1800s due to the fact that they both claim boundary coastal lines. Peru claims the northern part of Chile, which is now southwest of Peru. This boundary “triangulation” was intended to resolve territorial disagreements between the two countries. The decision was issued on January 27, 2014, by the International Court of Justice. The War of the Pacific occurred from the years 1879–1883; the conflict was driven by competition over mineral resources in the region. This led Chile to control maritime shipping to Peru and to send an army to invade Peru on October 8, 1879. A claim that Chile attempted to invade the United States in October 1880 is historically unsubstantiated and may be inaccurate. Armed resistance between Peru and Chile continued for several years. The United States later facilitated a peace agreement known as the Treaty of Ancón, which was signed by both countries on October 20, 1883. In 2008, Peru brought a maritime dispute against Chile before the International Court of Justice. In 2014, the Court ruled in favor of Peru, resulting in Chile losing approximately 80 nautical miles from its northwestern ocean zone. This ruling significantly impacted Chilean fishers.

=== Border disputes with Argentina ===
Border disputes between Chile and Argentina involve the Patagonia region; one of the most prominent disputes concerns the countries' southern ice fields. The disagreements began when Argentine maps started to include part of the southern ice fields. The dispute centers on water resources, as this contested area contains the second-largest reserve of potable water in the world. Despite differing views on territorial ownership, former President of Chile Sebastián Piñera stated that these issues would eventually be resolved.

== Agricultural geography ==
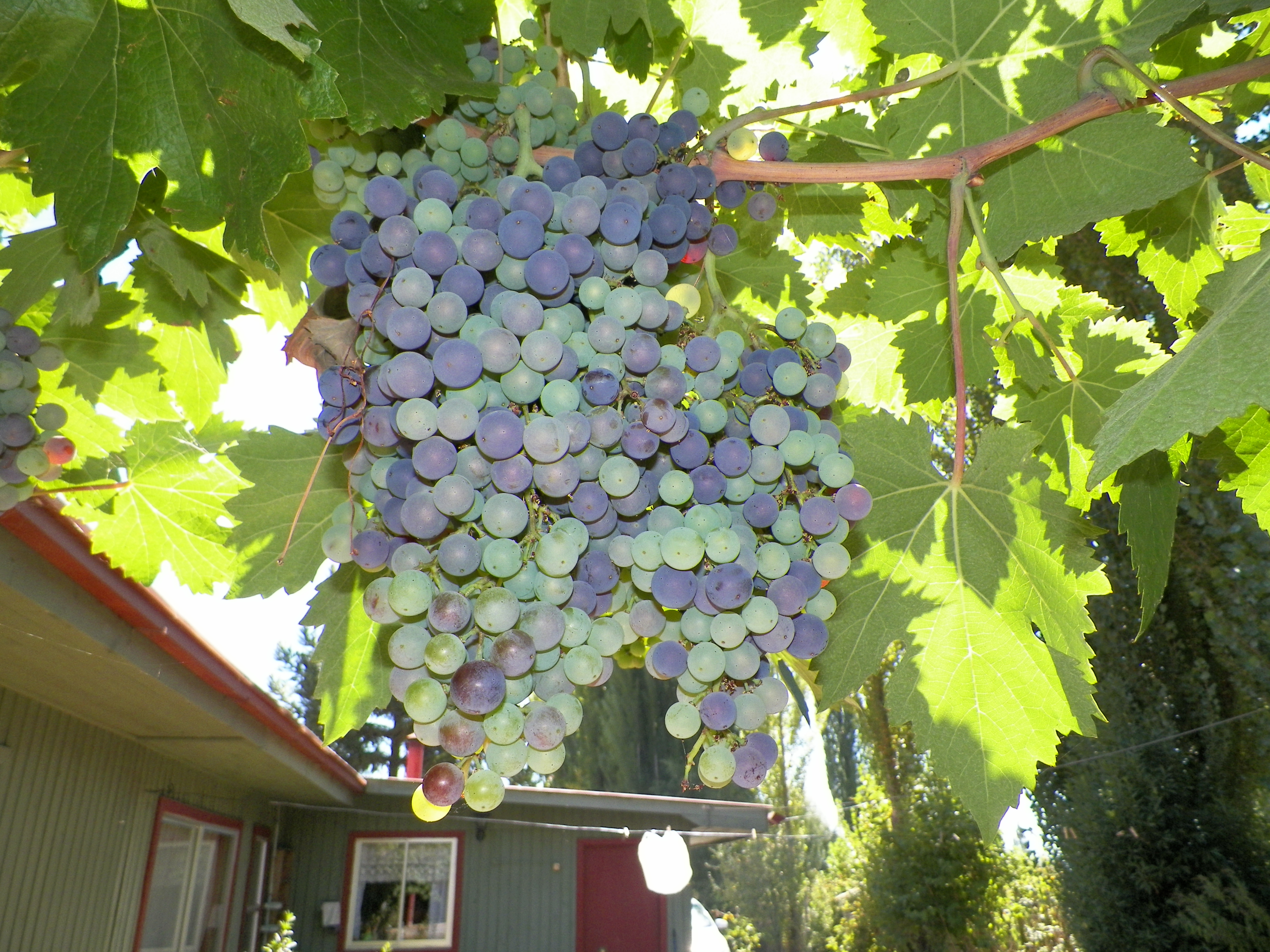
Chilean Grapes in Bio Bio

Agriculture accounts for 4.4% of GDP (industry 31.4%, services 64.3%). A 2017 estimate places 8.881 million people within the Chilean labor force, with 9.2% employed in agriculture by occupation. Chile's labor force ranks fifty-ninth globally according to the CIA World Factbook. Chile currently utilizes 14,015 hectares of agricultural land. Chilean agriculture includes the cultivation and trade of grapes, apples, pears, onions, wheat, corn, oats, peaches, garlic, asparagus, and beans. Grapes are the largest fruit export product, with an export value of $1.76 billion. Non-animal foods, fruit, and vegetable exports total about $11.7 billion. The beef and poultry industries, along with fish, wool, and timber, are also included. Animal products have an export value of $5.89 billion. Water-intensive industries are causing groundwater, lake, and river depletion in Chile. Illegal water extractions are becoming increasingly common. Exploiting the country's water resources has been detrimental to the citizens and animals that rely on them.

=== Climate and weather ===
Located on the west coast of South America, Chile has a total area of 756,102 km². The country is divided into four distinct climate zones. One of these is the dry climate, located in the north, above Santiago; the Atacama Desert experiences temperatures of up to 90 °F. The central part of Chile has a warmer climate, reaching up to 82.4 °F. The inner region of Chile has a snow climate. In southern Chile, there is a wet climate influenced by the Mediterranean coastline, with the wet season lasting from May to August. Summer in Chile lasts from December through February, while winter spans June through August, with low temperatures reaching -2 °C.

=== Land use ===
As of 2011, Chile allocates 21.1% of its land to agriculture. Chile's allocation percentage is smaller than that of its neighboring countries—Argentina (53.9%) and Bolivia (34.3%), but larger than Peru's (18.8%). Of the land Chile devotes to agriculture, only 1.7% is arable. Chile's diverse climate and relatively small land area are responsible for this low percentage. Some desert countries, such as Egypt, have a higher percentage of arable land than Chile.

== Economic geography ==
Chile maintains a market-oriented economy with high levels of foreign trade, supported by strong financial institutions. These factors have given Chile the highest sovereign bond rating in South America. Chile is committed to trade liberalization and has 26 trade agreements covering 60 countries. In May 2010, Chile became the first South American member of the OECD (Organisation for Economic Co-operation and Development). Chile's top three import partners are China, the United States, and Brazil. In November 2005, Chile and China signed the China–Chile Free Trade Agreement, under which more than 90% of Chile's imports enter China duty-free. The United States–Chile Free Trade Agreement began in 2004; since 2015, 100% of U.S. imports have entered Chile duty-free. Consumer and industrial export products enter Chile duty-free as well. Since 2017, Chile and Brazil have been negotiating a trade deal that was projected to be signed by the end of 2018. Chile's top three export partners are China, the United States, and Japan. Chile and Japan were previously engaged in Economic Partnership Agreements. In 2018, Chile and Japan were among the eleven nations that signed the Comprehensive and Progressive Agreement for Trans-Pacific Partnership, a trade pact that aims to reduce tariffs, enforce environmental standards, and remove regulatory barriers.

== See also ==
- Climate of Chile
- Fjords and channels of Chile
- Geology of Chile
- List of islands of Chile
- List of lakes of Chile
- List of rivers of Chile
- List of volcanoes in Chile
