= Rainy season in the Altiplano =

Walter-Lieth diagram of the zone where Lauca River crosses the Bolivia–Chile border. Precipitation can be observed for first months of each year.

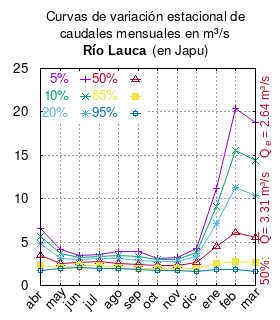
Seasonal variation curves of Lauca River in Japu in Chile near the border with Bolivia. The river shows higher discharges in summer from December to February.

The rainy season in the Altiplano, known in Chile as Andean winter, Altiplano winter or Bolivian winter, (Note: Andean winter, Altiplano winter or Bolivian winter are translations of the Spanish invierno altiplánico, invierno andino and invierno boliviano . The use of the term "winter" is paradoxical, since the phenomenon occurs mainly between December and March, corresponding to the Southern Hemisphere summer.) are rains that occur each season over much of the Altiplano plateau in the Southern Hemisphere summer.

The precipitation during this season originates primarily from moist air masses coming from humid lowlands to the east of the Altiplano including those of the southern Amazon region. It is the activity of an anticyclone known as the Bolivian High which brings in moist air over the Altiplano. The humid air masses precipitate rain in the Altiplano of the Andes due to convective activity, which is associated with the formation of cumuliform clouds during the afternoon, when ground heating promotes upward movements and produces rainfall in this area. The southern Altiplano receives far less rainfall than the northern part as air masses from the Amazon enters the region less frequently due to increased distance from the north.

When the El Niño phase of the El Niño–Southern Oscillation is in place there is tendency for lower than usual rainfall during the rainy season in the Altiplano. Easterlies that are stronger than usual tend to displace southward the Bolivian High and thus lead to increased rainfall.

Rainfall outside the rainy season is rare and typically derives from anomalies in the middle latitudes to the south. One such anomaly is when stronger than usual westerlies weakens the Bolivian High. In normal years it is the westerlies that bring in dry air over the altiplno from March to November.

As of 2025 a majority of predictive models indicate that in the future rainfall over the Altiplano will diminish relative to the early 21st century.

The increase in rainfall during summer is one of the two main humidity-related meteorological phenomena that occur in the Atacama Desert. The other phenomenon is the camanchaca, which extends over the coast of northern Chile.

== See also ==
- Dry Andes
- Floods in Bolivia
- Mesothermal valley
- Tropical Andes
- Tropical rain belt
