= Chile Route Y-85 =

Chilean road in Tierra del Fuego

Route Y-85

Route information
- Existed: 2018–2023 (estimated)–present

Major junctions
- From: Near Cerro Pérez Gacitúa, Tierra del Fuego Province
- Caleta María road – Lake Fagnano
- To: Yendegaia Bay, Cabo de Hornos, Antártica Chilena Province

Location
- Country: Chile

Highway system
- Highways in Chile

Route Y-85 is a road located in the Magallanes Region in southern Chile, specifically in the south-central part of the Isla Grande of Tierra del Fuego, the largest island of the Tierra del Fuego archipelago, at the southern tip of South America. The northern stretch runs through arid steppe plains covered with coirón grass, while to the south the terrain becomes mountainous and covered with dense Magellanic forests. The southern section of this road, known as the Vicuña–Yendegaia penetration path, is currently under construction and aims to reach Yendegaia Bay on the Beagle Channel.

== General overview ==
The route starts near the Cerro Pérez Gacitúa, connecting with routes Y-71 and 257, passing through Cameron, Pampa Guanaco and Lake Fagnano.

The Chilean state is currently constructing a scenic road through the south-central area of Tierra del Fuego Island. This extension of the Y-85 aims to cross the central section of the Fuegian Andes, starting in the commune of Timaukel (in the Tierra del Fuego Province) and reaching the commune of Cabo de Hornos (in the Antártica Chilena Province).

The goal is to connect the area of Pampa Guanacos with Yendegaia Bay, on the northern shore of the Beagle Channel. From there, a one-hour ferry ride would allow vehicles to cross the channel to Puerto Navarino, connecting with the Y-905 road network and leading to Puerto Williams.

The western area of Yendegaia Bay is part of the Yendegaia National Park, which was donated in 2013 by the Yendegaia Foundation, associated with American conservationist Douglas Tompkins.

The project is a joint effort between the regional government, the Ministry of Public Works (MOP), and the Chilean Army's Military Work Corps (CMT).

== History ==
After the founding of Estancia Vicuña in 1915, it remained for a long time the southernmost Chilean settlement accessible by land on the Isla Grande de Tierra del Fuego. Over time, other settlements were established, such as Caleta María, at the eastern end of the Almirantazgo Sound.

Reports suggest that the indigenous inhabitants of the region were familiar with the overland route to the south. This was documented, for example, in the writings of the English missionary Thomas Bridges.

Further south, on the northern shore of the Beagle Channel, lay Yendegaia, which was accessible by sea. The land between these two locations was known through indigenous oral tradition. As early as 1882, Giacomo Bove was aware of an easy crossing between Almirantazgo and Yendegaia, though the actual path remained uncharted. The first explorers to venture into the region included Tomás Zurueta (1892), Eduardo O'Connor (1892), the International Boundary Commission (1895), Otto Nordenskjöld (1896), Carl Skottsberg (1908), and Alberto María de Agostini (1913).

In 1890, the Chilean boundary commission with Argentina published a map drawn by Carlos Soza Bruna that included an unnamed lake in the location of present-day Lake Fagnano. In 1892, a team led by Zurueta crossed from Lapataia to Almirantazgo, though their route was not recorded. Around the same time, Argentine explorers O'Connor and Montes confirmed the existence of the lake identified by Soza Bruna. The coincidence of a "predicted" and a "sighted" lake led author Samuel García O. to suspect that Agostini had at least informed Soza Bruna of the lake's existence.

In 1895, the International Boundary Commission reached the eastern end of Almirantazgo Sound, mapping the area and naming rivers such as the Azopardo, Betbeder, Mascarello, and Fontaine. In February of the following year, an expedition by Otto Nordenskjöld discovered a valley to the south but did not proceed in that direction.

In February 1908, Carl Skottsberg, Percy Quensel, Thore Halle, Albert Pagels, and Karl Müller followed the Azopardo River upstream into the Betbeder valley, reaching the pass called Paso Las Lagunas that crosses the mountain range. Although they did not see the Beagle Channel, they did discover Lake Lovenborg (originally named Löwenborg).

Eventually, Salesian priest Alberto María de Agostini, along with companions Juan De Gasperi and brothers Abel and Augusto Pession, became the first white men to travel overland from Almirantazgo Sound to the Beagle Channel via the Betbeder and Rojas River valleys, in a journey that lasted from 19 to 24 February 1913.

The route through the Lapataia River previously taken by Zurueta (though unrecorded) was repeated in 1922 by American painter Rockwell Kent.

=== Plans for a road ===
The idea to connect the Fuegian settlements along the Strait of Magellan to the Beagle Channel via a penetration road through Chilean territory was initiated following a 1978 expedition that successfully linked the Estancia Vicuña with Yendegaia Bay. This expedition assessed the technical feasibility of such a project and roughly outlined the proposed route.

Construction of the Andean extension of this gravel road began in late 1979 and early 1980. The Dirección de Vialidad Regional awarded the first 20 km to Ingeniería Civil Vicente. In early 1980, BELFI S.A. constructed the Vicuña Bridge. Between late 1981 and March 1982, Dieter Meier S.A. built an additional 12 km. Work then stalled until 1994, when the Military Work Corps (CMT) resumed construction. The project was initially expected to be completed by 2019 or 2023. Of the total 139 km planned (south from Estancia Vicuña), only the first 75 km had been completed by 2012. Progress was slow in early years due to the challenges of building in a remote and snowy region.

The 51-kilometre stretch between the Rasmussen River Bridge (km 0) and the vicinity of Lake Fagnano was constructed between 1995 and 2007 by the Military Work Corps.

== Route ==
Initial explorations of Route Y-85, over a 1955 map from the Military Geographic Institute at a 1:250000 scale. The route starts at CH 257, crosses Y-71, and roughly follows the path taken by the 1978 Vicuña–Yendegaia expedition, shown as the green line.

The road passes by Caleta Josefina and then runs south along Bahía Inútil. After branching east to Y-893, it reaches the village of Cameron. There, it leaves the coast and heads east into the island's interior. It passes through the area of Russfin, then branches northeast to Y-895. Up to this point, the route was also known by that designation. Continuing along the straight Route Y-85, the landscape consists of an endless, undulating, arid steppe covered with coirón grass swept by strong southwestern winds. The road crosses the Río Grande via a bridge near the Río Grande area. Further on, it reaches the small settlement of Pampa Guanaco, where there is a weather station, a Carabineros post, and the Pampa Guanaco Airfield (SCBI). This Carabineros post was previously located near Estancia Vicuña. From Pampa Guanaco, Route Y-761 branches southwest to the large Lake Blanco. Two kilometers further along Route Y-85, after crossing a tributary of the Río Grande, Route Y-769 branches eastward, leading to Estancia Bellavista and ultimately to the “Río Bellavista” international pass that connects with Argentina's Route B.

Continuing along Route Y-85, the road enters the Karukinka Natural Park, a large private protected area of 300,000 ha owned by the Wildlife Conservation Society (WCS).

Magellanic forests, initially sparse, become the dominant vegetation, except in wide valleys where peat bogs prevail. The road crosses and follows the Rasmussen River near Estancia Vicuña, where the “Vicuña sector” ranger base of Karukinka Park is located.

=== "Vicuña–Yendegaia Penetration Path" section ===
This is the most well-known section of the route, officially called the “Vicuña–Yendegaia Penetration Path,” spanning 138 km divided into two parts: the first 67 km reach Lake Fagnano, and the remaining 71 km continue to the final point at the Beagle Channel. Construction began in 1994 and is being carried out by the Military Work Corps (CMT).

This section enters the Yendegaia National Park. The first ascent begins here, with several switchbacks, reaching an altitude of 631 meters. It then descends into the valley of Lake Despreciado, which it skirts from the north. At its eastern end begins the 33 km “La Paciencia” hiking trail, which runs westward along the southern shore of the lake and follows the Sánchez River (north of the Valdivieso Range) to La Paciencia Bay in the Almirantazgo Sound.

Continuing on Route Y-85, at kilometer 55 the road reaches the western shore of Lake Deseado (elevation 167 meters), which it follows for 4.6 km along the southern edge. The only inhabited site on the lake is located here, the “Lodge Deseado.” This stretch of the road was inaugurated in 2005.

The road then heads south and begins another climb. After an 8 km ascent, it reaches 694 meters, crossing a second Andean ridge. It then descends to the northwestern shore of Lake Fagnano. The road continues west around the lake until it crosses its outflow, the Azopardo River, via the “Roberto Sturiza Kusanovic” bridge. Here it connects to another road under construction, which follows the river valley to Caleta María on the Almirantazgo Sound, where remnants of an old sawmill are found.

From the river's source (at an elevation of 33 meters), the road extends 71 km to its final destination. It follows the southern shore of the lake, climbs again for 2 km, then continues south past the CMT “Azopardo” camp. The road moves away from the lake and follows the Betbeder River valley, reaching a point 8 km south of the lake—marking the maximum extent of work as of March 2015.

The next segment will climb to the Las Lagunas Pass (500 meters), dividing the watersheds of Lakes Fagnano and Errázuriz. It will descend into the Lapataia River valley, cross the river, and follow the Pirámides River valley until reaching the Yandegaia River valley (originating from the Stoppani Glacier) and eventually the Beagle Channel at Yendegaia Bay. The final part of the route will run along the northern shore of the bay, skirting the Pirámides Hills, and ending at Caleta Dos de Mayo, site of the “Dos de Mayo” border outpost of the Carabineros de Chile. A second construction front will begin from the endpoint to build 31 km in the opposite direction, eventually connecting both sections.

== See also ==
- Yendegaia River
- Lapataia River
- Bellavista River
- Lake Deseado
- Lake Lovenborg
- Rojas River
