= Marinelli =

Marinelli is a surname of Italian origin, and may refer to:

== People ==
- Alan Marinelli (born 1999), Argentine professional footballer
- Anthony Marinelli (born 1959), American pianist, musician, composer and conductor
- Benny Marinelli (1902–1927), American thoroughbred horse racing jockey
- Carlos Marinelli (born 1982), Argentine professional footballer
- Chris Marinelli (born 1987), former American football offensive tackle
- Danielle Roy Marinelli, Canadian politician
- Danko Marinelli (born 1987), Croatian alpine skier
- Giancarlo Marinelli (1915–1987), Italian basketball player
- Giovanni Marinelli (1879–1944), Italian Fascist political leader
- Gonzalo Marinelli (born 1989), Argentine professional footballer
- Jacques Marinelli (1925–2025), French cyclist
- Joe Marinelli (1957–2025), American actor
- Karl von Marinelli (1745–1803), Austrian actor, theatre manager and playwright
- Leonardo Marinelli, Italian commander for the Guardia di Finanza
- Leonidas D. Marinelli (1906–1974), Argentine-American radiologist and inventor
- Louis J. Marinelli (born 1986), American political activist of the California independence movement
- Luca Marinelli (born 1984), Italian actor
- Matthew Marinelli (born 1985), American professional wrestler
- Paolo Marinelli (born 1995), Croatian professional basketball player
- Roberta Marinelli, American oceanographer
- Rod Marinelli (born 1949), American football coach
- Sonny Marinelli (born 1967), American actor and voice actor
- Vincenzo Marinelli (1820–1892), Italian painter

== Fictional characters ==
- Marinelli, in the 1772 play Emilia Galotti by G. E. Lessing

== See also ==
- Marinelli Beaker
- Marinelli Creek
- Marinelli Field
- Marinelli Glacier
- Marinelli Bell Foundry, Italy's pontifical foundry, founded in 1339
- Farinelli (disambiguation).
