= Stoppani =

Stoppani is an Italian surname. Notable people with the surname include:

- Antonio Stoppani (1824–1891) – Italian Catholic priest, patriot, geologist and palaeontologist
- Giovanni Francesco Stoppani (1695–1774), Italian cardinal and diplomat
- Mario Stoppani (1895–1959) – Italian World War I flying ace

== See also ==
- Stoppani Glacier, valley glacier located in Alberto de Agostini National Park, Isla Grande de Tierra del Fuego
