= Yendegaia Airport =

Airport in Chile

- IATA: none; ICAO: SCNY

Summary
- Airport type: Public
- Serves: Tierra del Fuego Province, Chile
- Elevation AMSL: 164 ft (50 m)
- Coordinates: 54°49′50″S 68°50′07″W

Map
- Location of Yendegaia Airport in Chile

Runways
Direction	Length		Surface
Direction	m	ft	Surface
12/30	655	2,149	Grass
- Source: Landings.com Google Maps GCM

Yendegaia Airport Spanish: Aeropuerto Yendegaia, (ICAO: SCNY) is a rural airstrip in the Magallanes Region of Chile. The nearest town is Ushuaia, 32 kilometres (20 mi) to the east in Argentina.

The airstrip is within a bend of the glacier fed Yendegaia River, 2 kilometres (1.2 mi) upstream from the mouth of the river at Yendegaia Bay, an inlet off the Beagle Channel.

There is nearby mountainous terrain in all quadrants except southeast, over the bay. The river is less than 50 metres (160 ft) past either end of the runway.

The Ushuaia VOR (Ident: USU) is located 18.9 nautical miles (35.0 km) east of the airstrip.

== See also ==
- Transport in Chile
- List of airports in Chile
