= Farneti =

Farneti is an Italian surname. Notable people with the surname include:

- Emanuele Farneti (born 1974), Italian journalist
- Yuri Farneti (born 1996), Italian squash player
- Maria Farneti (1877–1955), Italian lyric soprano singer

== See also ==
- Farinetti
- Farinelli (disambiguation)
