= De Agostini Fjord =

Coordinates: 54°26′S 70°26′W

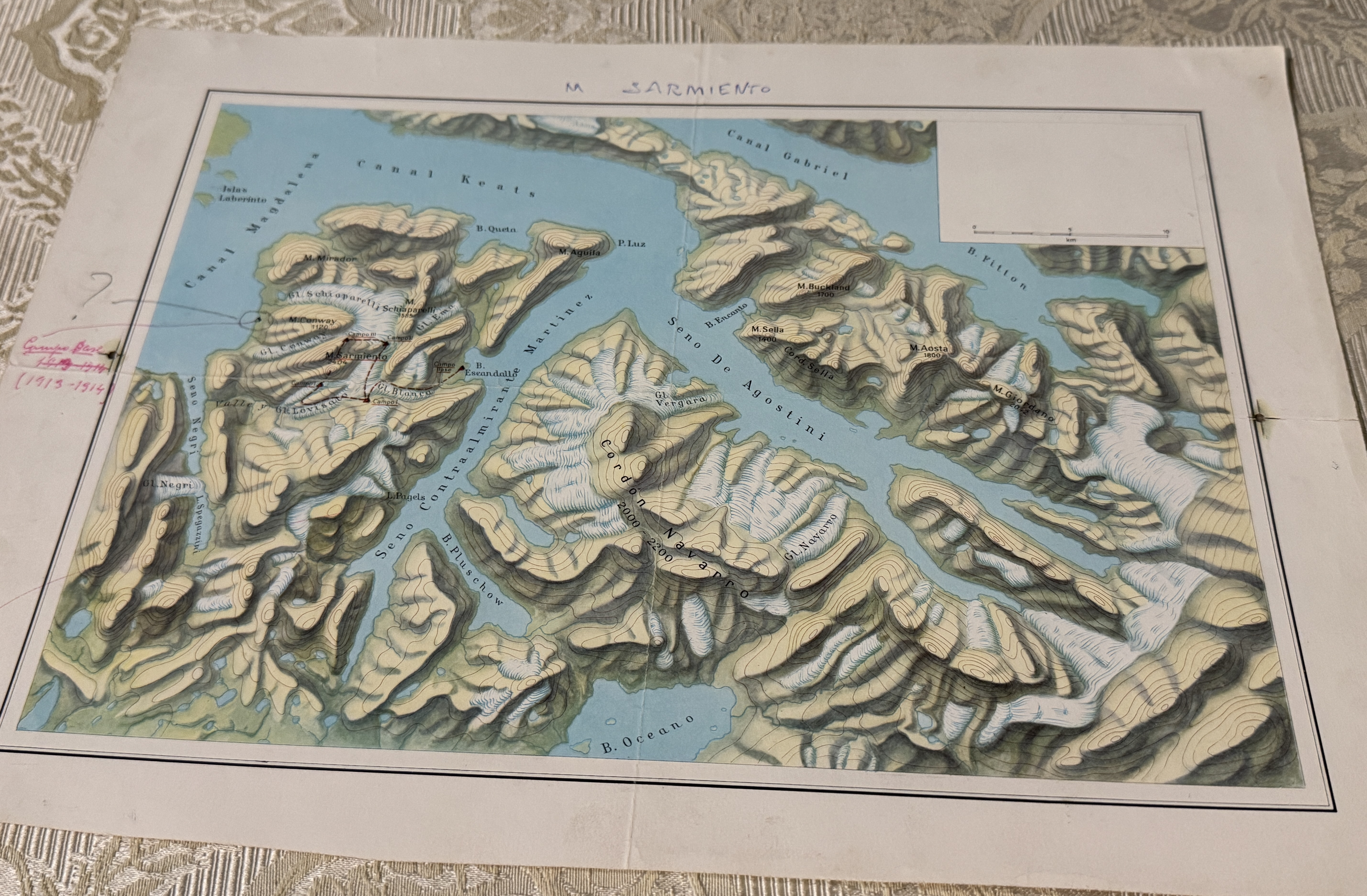
Topographic Map of Patagonia By Alberto Maria De Agostini (description page)

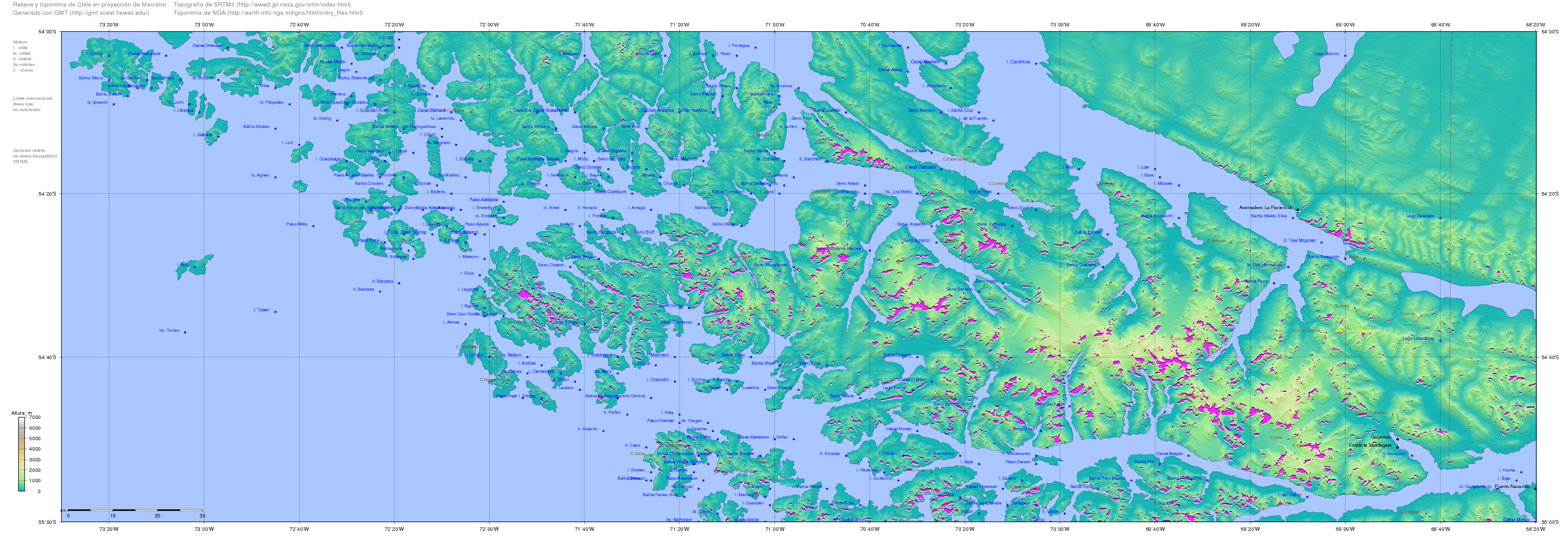

The maps shows the Beagle Channel (down), Cockburn Channel (horiz. waterway in the middle) and Magdalena Channel (vertical waterway)

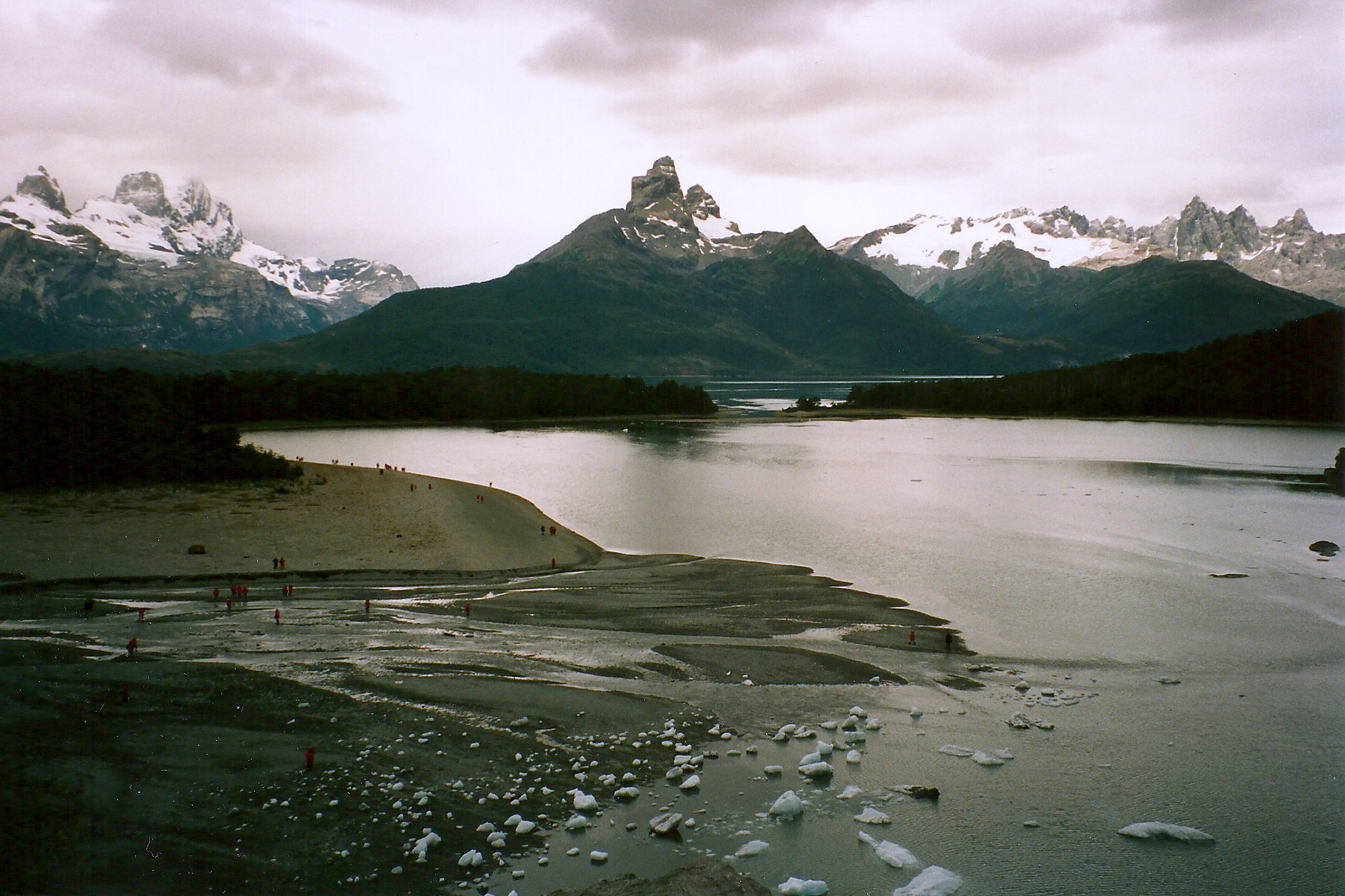
Águila Glacier area.

De Agostini Fjord, also known as De Agostini Sound (Spanish: Seno De Agostini), is a fjord in Tierra del Fuego that separates two branches of the Cordillera Darwin, the Cordón Navarro in the southwest and the mountain range that includes Monte Buckland in the northeast. It is named after the Italian explorer Alberto María de Agostini. The latter range contains some of the most rugged peaks in southern Chile and the former is a mostly ice-covered range. It connected to Magdalena Channel via Keats Sound.
