= Almirantazgo =

Almirantazgo may refer to:

- Almirantazgo Fjord, in Chile
- Yakutat Bay, in Alaska
