= Bel paese =

Classical poetical appellative for Italy

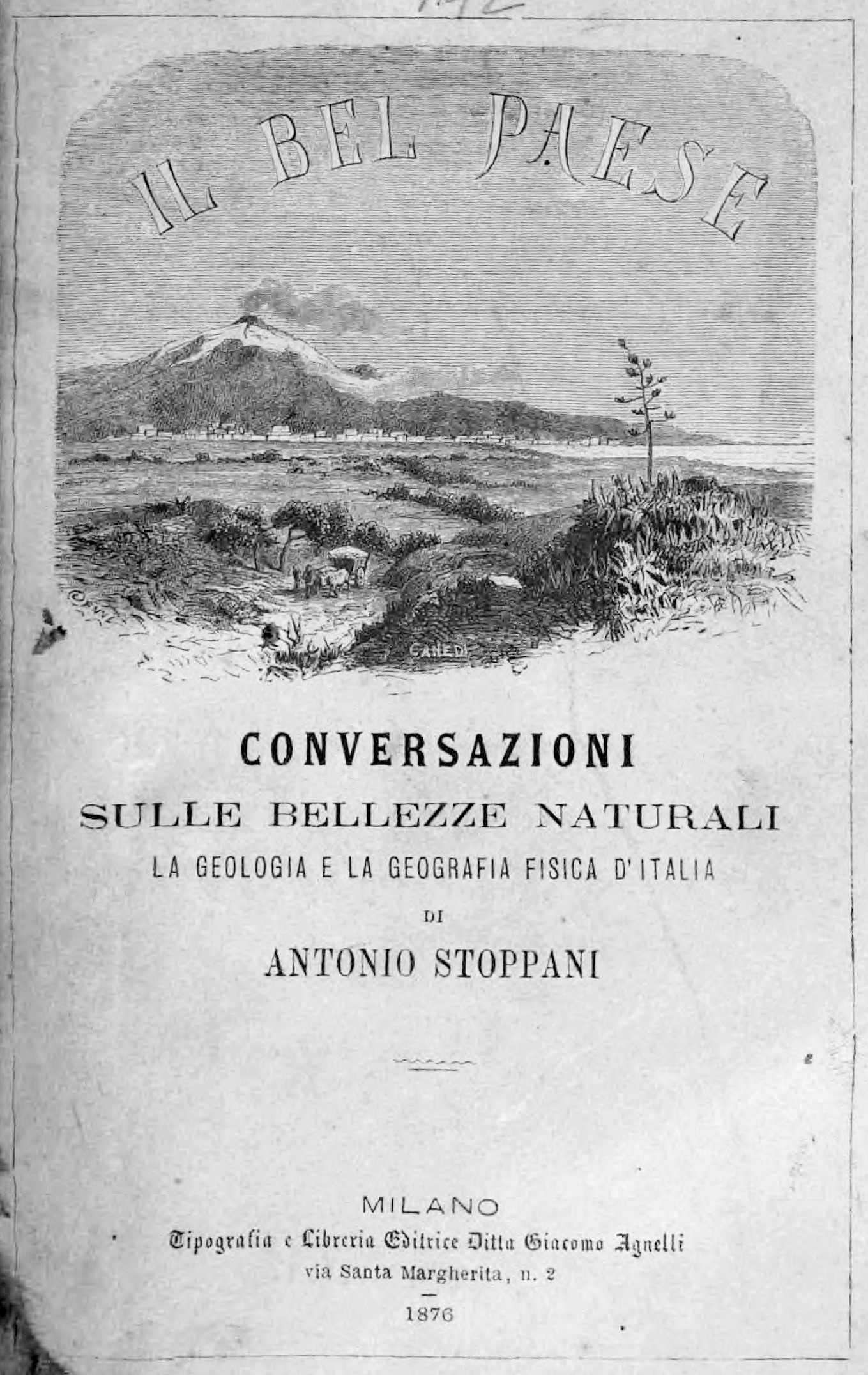
Stoppani's Il Bel Paese, 1867

Bel paese (Italian: [ˌbɛl paˈeːze]) or Belpaese is the classical poetical appellative for Italy, meaning the 'beautiful country' in Italian, due to its mild weather, cultural heritage, and natural endowment.

The usage of the term originated in the Middle Ages, being used by Dante Alighieri and Petrarch:

del bel paese là dove 'l sì suona,

— Dante, Divine Comedy: Inferno, canto XXXIII, line 80

Of the fair land there where the 'Sì' doth sound,

— Dante, Divine Comedy: Inferno, translated by Henry Wadsworth Longfellow

il bel paese
ch'Appennin parte e 'l mar circonda et l'Alpe

— Petrarch, Canzoniere, CXLVI, lines 13-14

that fair country
the Apennines divide, and Alps and sea surround

— Petrarch, Canzoniere, translation by A.S. Kline

In 1876, Antonio Stoppani wrote Il Bel Paese, conversazioni sulle bellezze naturali la geologia e la geologia e la geografia fisica d'Italia ('The Beautiful Land, conversations on the natural beauties, geology, and physical geography of Italy'), which inspired the creation of Bel Paese cheese, made in Lombardy from cow's milk.

The term is currently widely used in modern Italian as in other languages as a synonym for Italy. It is commonly used as a term of endearment by members of the Italian diaspora, and it is often used to endorse or promote goods and services both in Italy and abroad.
