= Yendegaia National Park =

National park in Chile

- IUCN category II (national park)
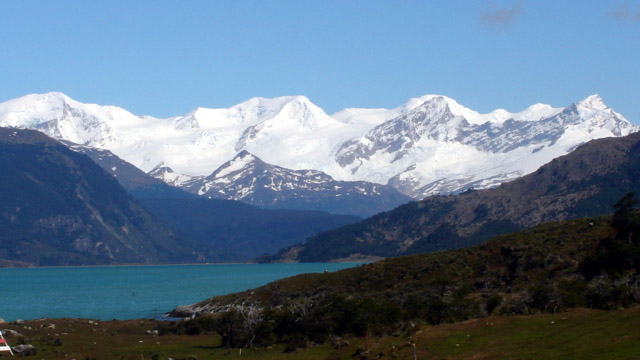
- Stoppani Glacier from Yendegaia fjord

- Location within Southern Patagonia
- Location: Tierra del Fuego (main island), Magallanes y la Antártica Chilena Region, Chile
- Nearest city: Porvenir, Chile
- Coordinates: 54.8490°S 68.8233°W
- Area: 111,832 ha (276,340 acres)
- Established: December 24, 2013
- Governing body: (CONAF) National Forest Corporation (Chile)

Yendegaia National Park is in Tierra del Fuego in the Magallanes y la Antártica Chilena Region of Chile and contains 150,612 ha (372,170 acres) of mountainous terrain and Valdivian temperate rain forest. It borders the Alberto de Agostini National Park, inside the Cape Horn Biosphere Reserve, and Tierra del Fuego National Park.

== Origin ==
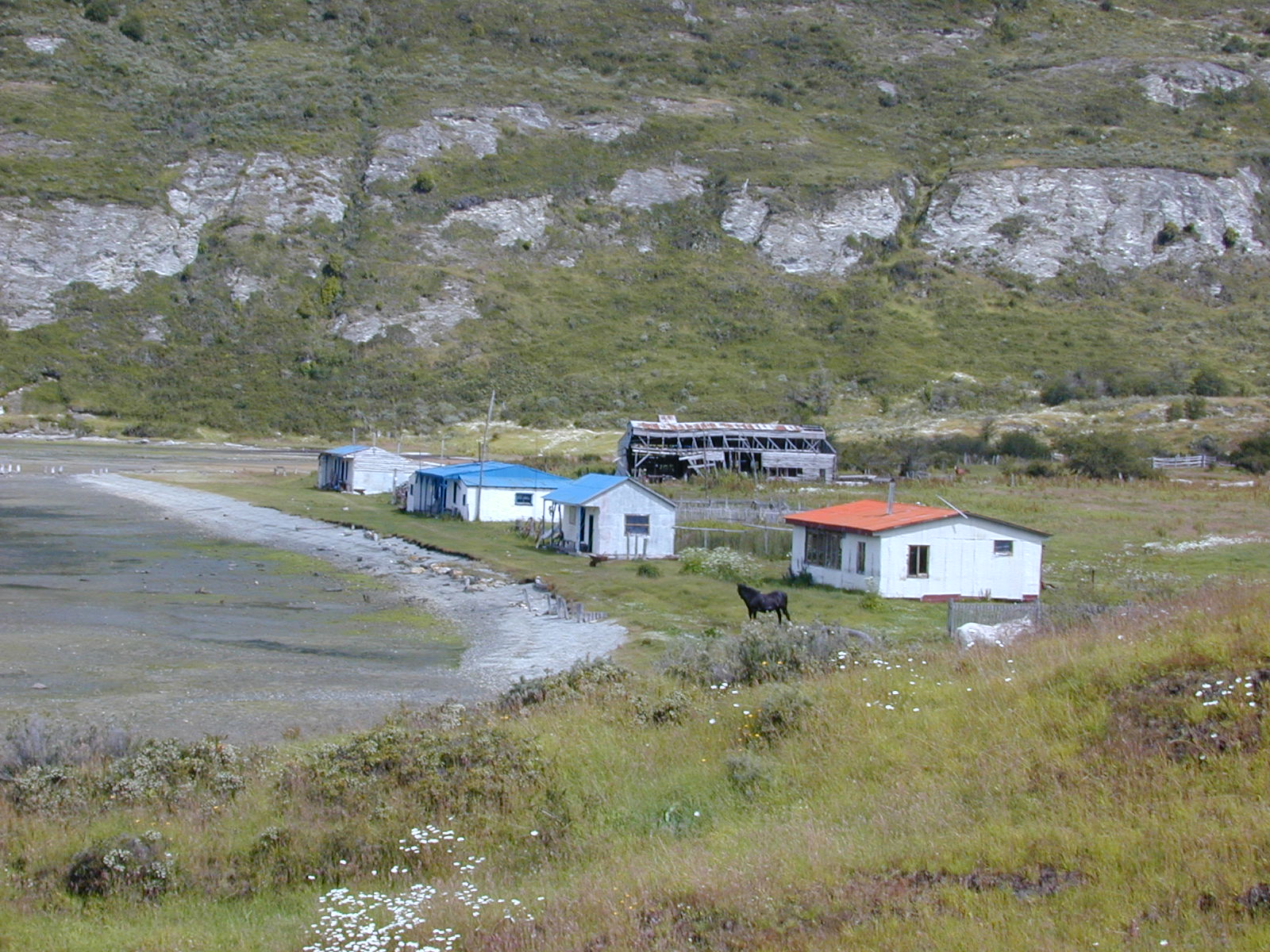
The remains of the old Yendegaia estate, now abandoned.

Yendegaia National Park is the result of public-private collaboration between the Government of Chile and the Yendegaia Foundation, a branch of the conservation project run by Douglas and Kris Tompkins. The park was first conceived in 2011 and was one of many projects created to celebrate the Bicentennial of Chile. It is made up of 111,832 ha (276,340 acres) of state owned land and 38,780 ha (95,800 acres) of the privately owned Estancia Yendegaia, which used to belong to the Tompkins' foundation of the same name, that gave the lands to the State of Chile in 2013 to create the National Park. Yendegaia's location on the border of Argentina's Tierra del Fuego National Park has allowed the creation of an International Union for Conservation of Nature trans-border park or "Peace Park".

== Geography ==
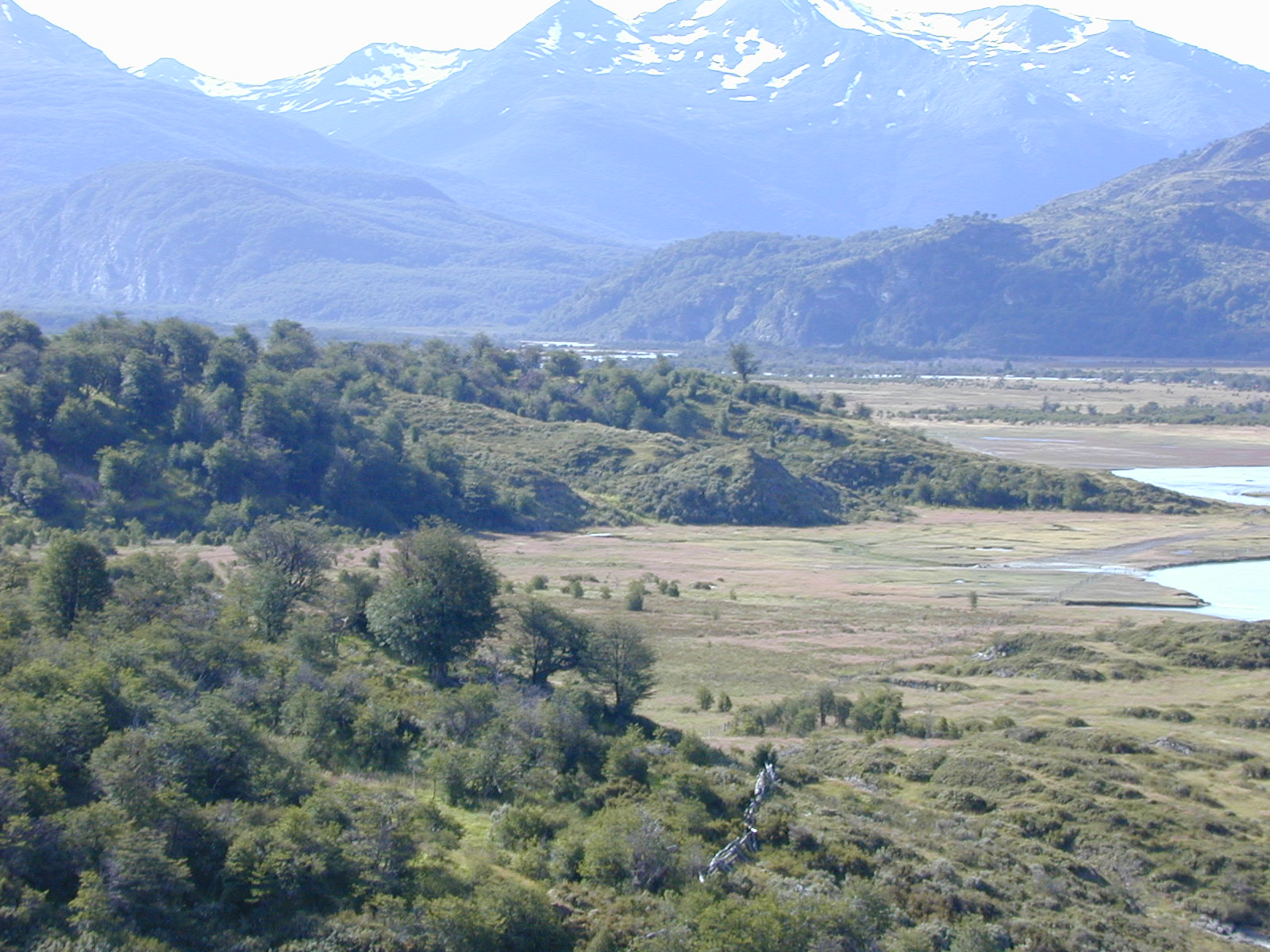
Yendegaia Valley

The park is located south of the Azopardo River and stretches from the Darwin Range to the Argentine border and from the Beagle Channel to Fagnago Lake. Yendegaia creates a contiguous ecological corridor between Chile's Alberto de Agostini National Park and Argentina's Tierra del Fuego National Park. The landscape is composed of mountains, glaciers, lakes, canals, rivers and fjords.

== Flora and fauna ==
The new park protects the last remaining sub-Antarctic beech forest, one of Earth's largest remnants of the Gondwana super continent dating back 180 million years ago. Other species that can be found in the park include Lenga (Nothofagus pumilio), Canelo (Drimys winteri) and Coigüe (Nothofagus dombeyi). The area provides an important habitat for three species in danger of extinction (the culpeo, the river otter, and the ruddy-headed geese), and a broad range of native flora and fauna, including 128 vascular plant species and 49 bird species.

== Administration and access ==
The park is administered by the Chilean National Forest Corporation (CONAF). The nearest urban area is the town of Porvenir in Chile, although the Argentinian city of Ushuaia is also nearby. The park can be reached by sea from Puerto Williams, or by road along the Y-85 route south from Porvenir.

== Trails ==
As the park was only founded in December 2013, official trails have not yet been created, but there are many non-official trails with various levels of difficulty starting from both the end of the Y-85 and from Fagnago Lake.

== Weather ==
Classified as subpolar oceanic climate, the weather in this region is variable and often inhospitable with heavy rain and regularly overcast skies. In winter, from June to September, the temperature can drop to 11 °C below zero. In summer, temperatures occasionally reach 24 °C.

== See also ==
- Alberto de Agostini National Park
- Diego Ramirez Islands & Drake Passage National Park
- Chile Route Y-85
