= Butterkäse =

German semi-soft cow's milk cheese

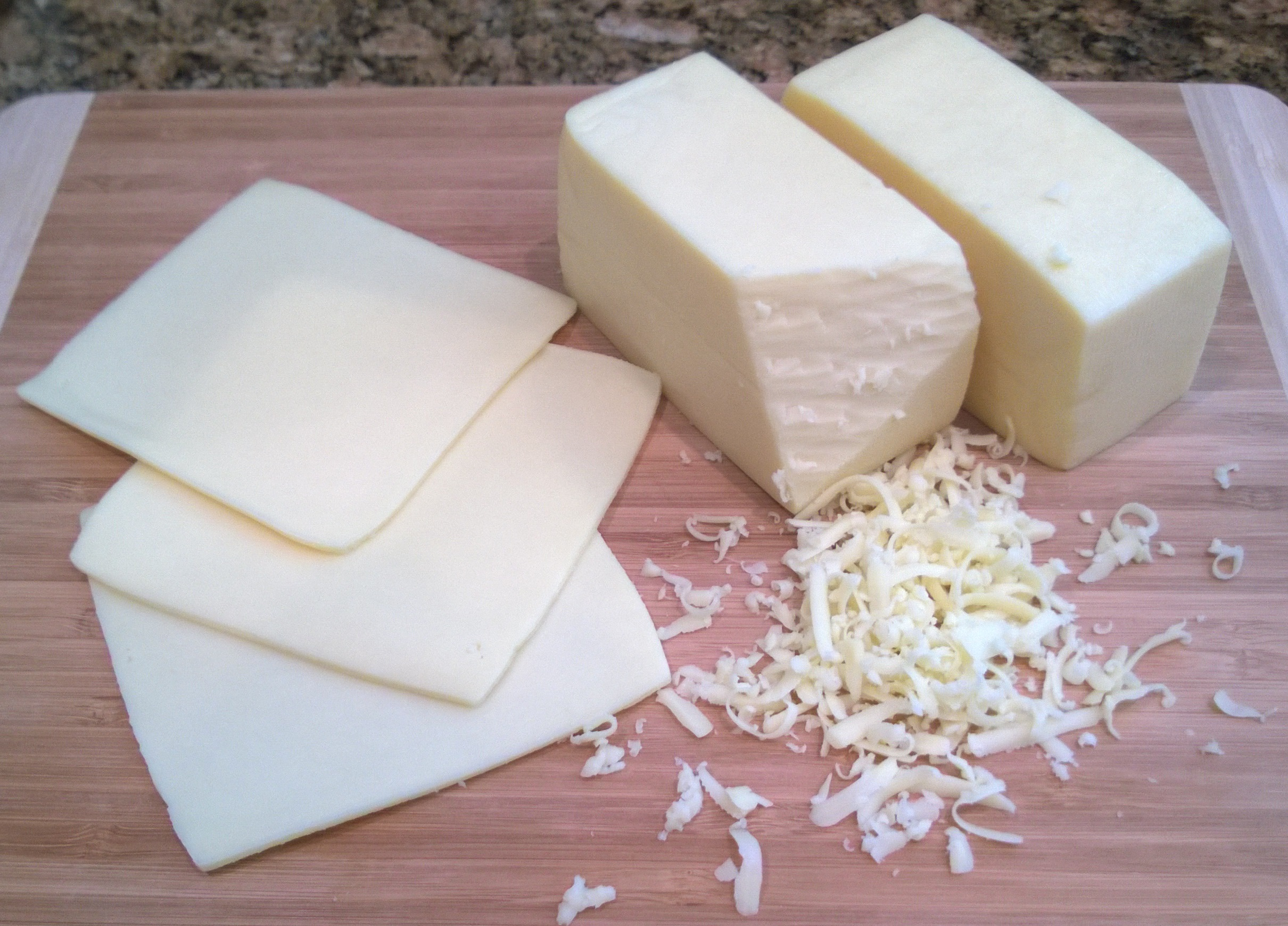
- Country of origin: Germany
- Source of milk: Cows
- Pasteurized: Yes
- Texture: semi-soft
- Aging time: 3–4 weeks

Butterkäse ("butter cheese" in German) is a semi-soft, cow's milk cheese moderately popular in Germanic Europe, and occasionally seen in the rest of the cheese-eating world. Although primarily produced in Germany, some Butterkäse is produced in Wisconsin.

== Description ==
As suggested by its name, Butterkäse has a buttery flavor and appearance. It is often described as mild, partly due to its brief aging time. The softness and mildly salty or acidic flavor is reminiscent of Muenster or Gouda cheeses. Butterkäse first appeared in 1928 as a variant of Italian Bel Paese. The texture of Butterkäse is smooth and creamy, sometimes nearly spreadable depending on the firmness desired by the cheese maker. Butterkäse is often sliced and added to rolls and sandwiches or melted for cooking.

Butterkäse is light in color, ranging from white to light yellow-orange. It is commonly found in a loaf shape convenient for slicing. It can also be found in a smoked variety.

== See also ==
- German cuisine
- List of German cheeses
- List of cheeses
