= Monte Sarmiento =

Mountain in Chile

Sarmiento
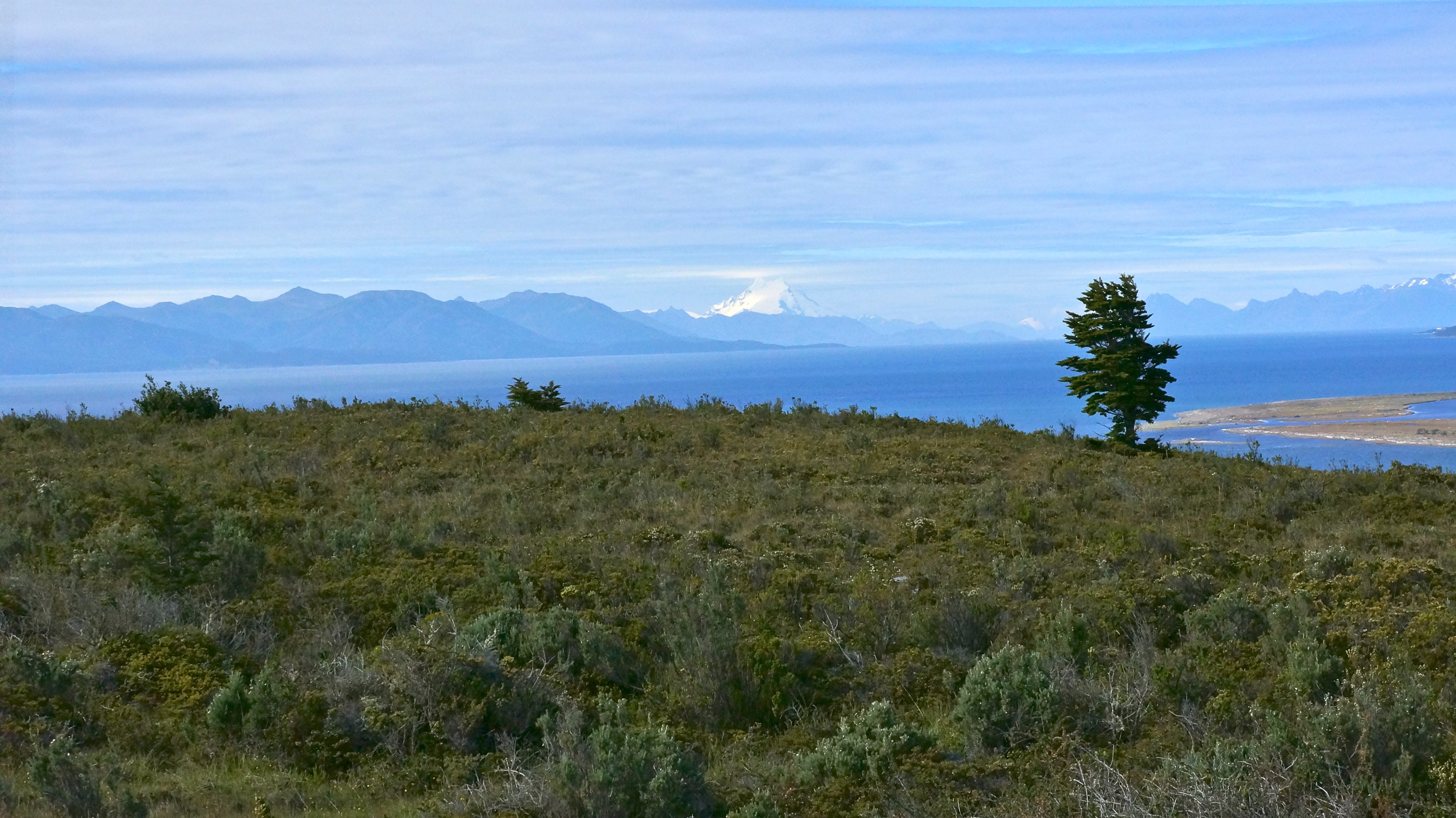
- Monte Sarmiento in the distance.

Highest point
- Elevation: 7,369 ft (2,246 m)
- Coordinates: 54°27′S 70°50′W

Geography
- Location: Chile
- Parent range: Andes

Climbing
- First ascent: 1956 by Carlo Mauri and Clemente Maffei

Monte Sarmiento is a pyramidal peak with a glaciated saddle-shaped summit located within Alberto de Agostini National Park, in the Chilean portion of Tierra del Fuego. It rises abruptly from the east shore of the Magdalena Channel and marks the western border of the Cordillera Darwin. The mountain is frequently shrouded in clouds, but when it is visible is "the most sublime spectacle in Tierra del Fuego" according to the words of Charles Darwin, one of the many people who have been captivated by the beauty of this mountain.

== History ==
The mountain was called "Volcán Nevado" (Snowy Volcano) by Pedro Sarmiento de Gamboa, who thought it was a volcano. Phillip Parker King named it Mount Sarmiento in honor of the mentioned explorer.

Several unsuccessful attempts were made to reach its summit, including those of Martin Conway in 1898 and of Alberto María de Agostini in 1913.

== 20th century ==
The eastern summit of Monte Sarmiento was climbed on 7 March 1956 by an expedition including the Italian mountaineers Clemente Gueret and Carlo Mauri. It was organized by Padre Alberto Maria De Agostini. The West Summit was climbed on 24 December 1986 by an Italian expedition of Ragni di Lecco including Gigi Alippi, Salvatore Panzeri, Lorenzo Mazzoleni, Pinuccio Castelnuovo, Bruno Pennati, Clemente Maffei, Gian Maria Confalonieri, Franco Baravalle, Salvatore Fantozzi e Luciano Bovina. This expedition opened a new route on the North Face. The west summit of Monte Sarmiento was climbed in 1995 by a party including the British mountaineers Stephen Venables, John Roskelley and Tim Macartney-Snape. A German team composed of Robert Jasper, Jörn Heller and Ralf Gantzhorn, climbed the North Face to the western summit on April 4, 2010. This team followed the route opened in 1986.

== In literature ==
The mountain is mentioned in the novels Twenty Thousand Leagues Under the Seas and Robur the Conqueror, both by Jules Verne, and in This Thing of Darkness by Harry Thompson.

== In cinema ==
An attempt to climb the mountain in 2003 is the subject of the Brazilian documentary film Extremo sul.
