= Mount Darwin (Andes) =

Mountain in Chile

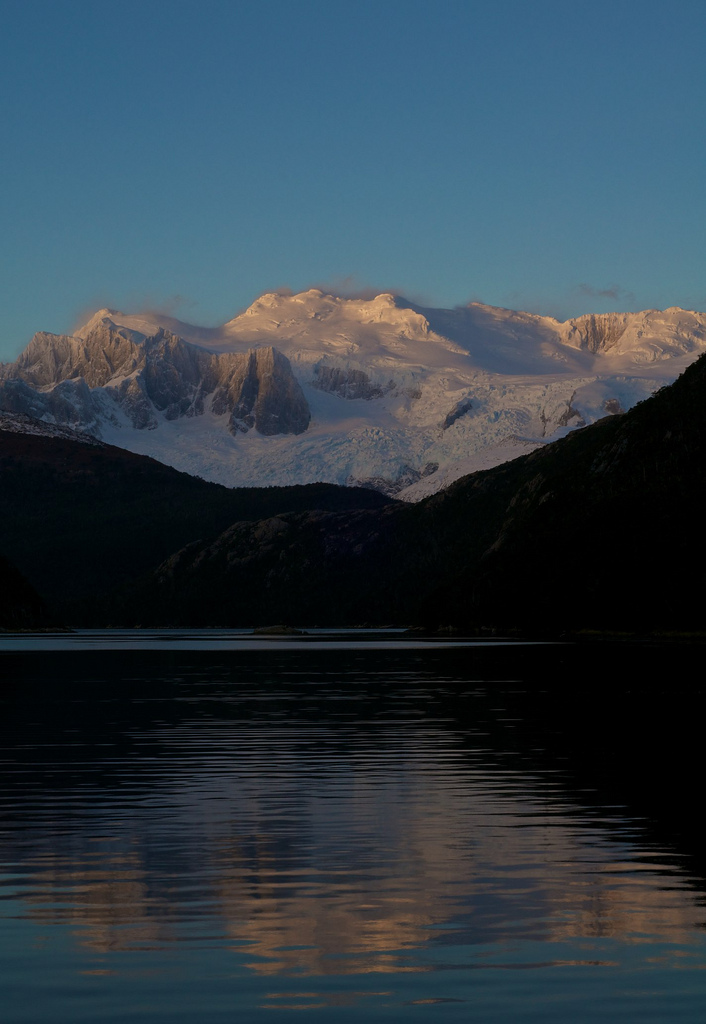
- Bahía Pía

Highest point
- Elevation: 2,438 m (7,999 ft)
- Coordinates: 54°45′S 69°29′W

Geography
- Location within Southern Patagonia
- Location: Tierra del Fuego, Chile
- Parent range: Andes

Climbing
- First ascent: 1970 by M. Andrews, N. Banks, M. Taylor, P. Radcliffe, P. James, N. Bennett and R. Heffernan

Mount Darwin (Spanish: Monte Darwin) is a peak in Isla Grande de Tierra del Fuego forming part of the Cordillera Darwin, the southernmost range of the Andes, just to the north of the Beagle Channel. It is 2,438 m (7,999 ft) high.

Monte Darwin was for a long time considered as the highest peak in Tierra del Fuego, but that distinction corresponds to a nearby mountain unofficially named Monte Shipton (also somewhat confusingly referred to as Darwin or Agostini-Darwin), which is about 2,580 m (8,460 ft) high and is located at 54°39′33″S 69°35′54″W. Both peaks are best climbed in late December, January, February and March. Monte Shipton was first climbed in 1962 by Eric Shipton, E. Garcia, F. Vivanco and C. Marangunic.

Mount Darwin was given its name during the voyage of the Beagle by HMS Beagle's captain Robert FitzRoy to celebrate Charles Darwin's 25th birthday on 12 February 1834. A year earlier FitzRoy had named an expanse of water to the southwest of the mountain the Darwin Sound to commemorate Darwin's quick wit and courage in saving them from being marooned when waves from a mass of ice splitting off a glacier threatened their boats.

The mountain is part of Alberto de Agostini National Park. It is formed of crystalline schists and has massive glaciers down its steep southern slopes.
