= Lorenzo Mazzoleni =

Italian mountaineer

Personal information
- Nickname: Aleghér
- Born: December 15, 1966 Lecco, Italy
- Died: July 29, 1996 (aged 29) K2
- Resting place: K2
- Monument(s): Amici di Lorenzo Association, Namaste di Bulciago
- Occupation(s): Chef, alpine guide
- Years active: 1980—1996

Sport
- Sport: Alpine Mountaineering
- Club: Ragni della Grignetta

Lorenzo "Aleghér" Mazzoleni (Lecco, December 15, 1966 – K2, July 29, 1996) was an Italian mountaineer. At the time of his death on K2 at age 29, he was considered one of the most promising Italian climbers of his generation.

== Biography ==
Considered a climbing prodigy, Mazzoleni began climbing at age ten, when he signed up for youth mountaineering courses at the Italian Alpine Club in Lecco. He soon was climbing in the nearby Lombardy foothills.

In 1980, at age 14, Mazzoleni climbed his first 4,000 m peak, Gran Paradiso. A t 18, he joined his local mountaineering club, the "Grignetta Spiders" (in Italian: Ragni della Grignetta), a section of the Italian Alpine Club in his hometown of Lecco, dedicated to international mountaineering.

=== Climbing abroad ===
In 1986, aged 19, he travelled to Patagonia with the Spiders mountaineering group, where they made a first ascent on the West face of Monte Sarmiento, in the Terra del Fuego. The team reached the summit on December 24, 1986.

Two years later at age 21, Mazzoleni climbed his first eight-thousander, Cho Oyu. That year, he led his first expedition to Mount Everest, for a summit attempt via the north face. The team reached a high point of 7,500 m before turning back due to poor weather.

In 1990, Mazzoleni made three successful first winter ascents: two direct routes on Cima Busazza, and a direct ascent of the South-West face of the Croz dell'Altissimo. That year he made his second attempt on Mount Everest, where he reached the south summit (8,750 m) before turning back due to high winds.

Mazzoleni returned to the Himalayas in 1991, where he was part of an expedition led by Casimiro Ferrari to climb the as-yet unclimbed west face of Makalu. The team managed to reach 7,300 m before turning back due to high winds.

In 1992, he made the first winter ascent of the central pillar of Monte Civetta. Alongside Marco Anghileri, Mazzoleni would make the first repeat and first winter ascent of the Marino Stenico route (VI+, A4) in five days. Then the pair would then make the first repeat and first winter ascent of the Via delgi Amici on Sasso Cavallo.

Later that year, he made his third attempt to climb Mount Everest. He reached the summit on September 28, 1992. He was 25 years old. The successful summit led Mazzoleni on a goal to climb the remainder of the Seven Summits.

In 1993, Mazzoleni returned to South America, where he summited Aconcagua, the tallest peak on the continent in winter. Climbing via the Messner route, Mazzoleni and climbing partner Simone Moro were trapped for five days in a bivoauc, fearing they would die. The pair filmed a "epitaph" video as conditions deteriorated. Eventually the weather cleared and they descended safely. Mazzoleni immediately started dancing upon reaching base camp.

Two years later he reached the highest summit in North America in 1995, when he summited Denali.

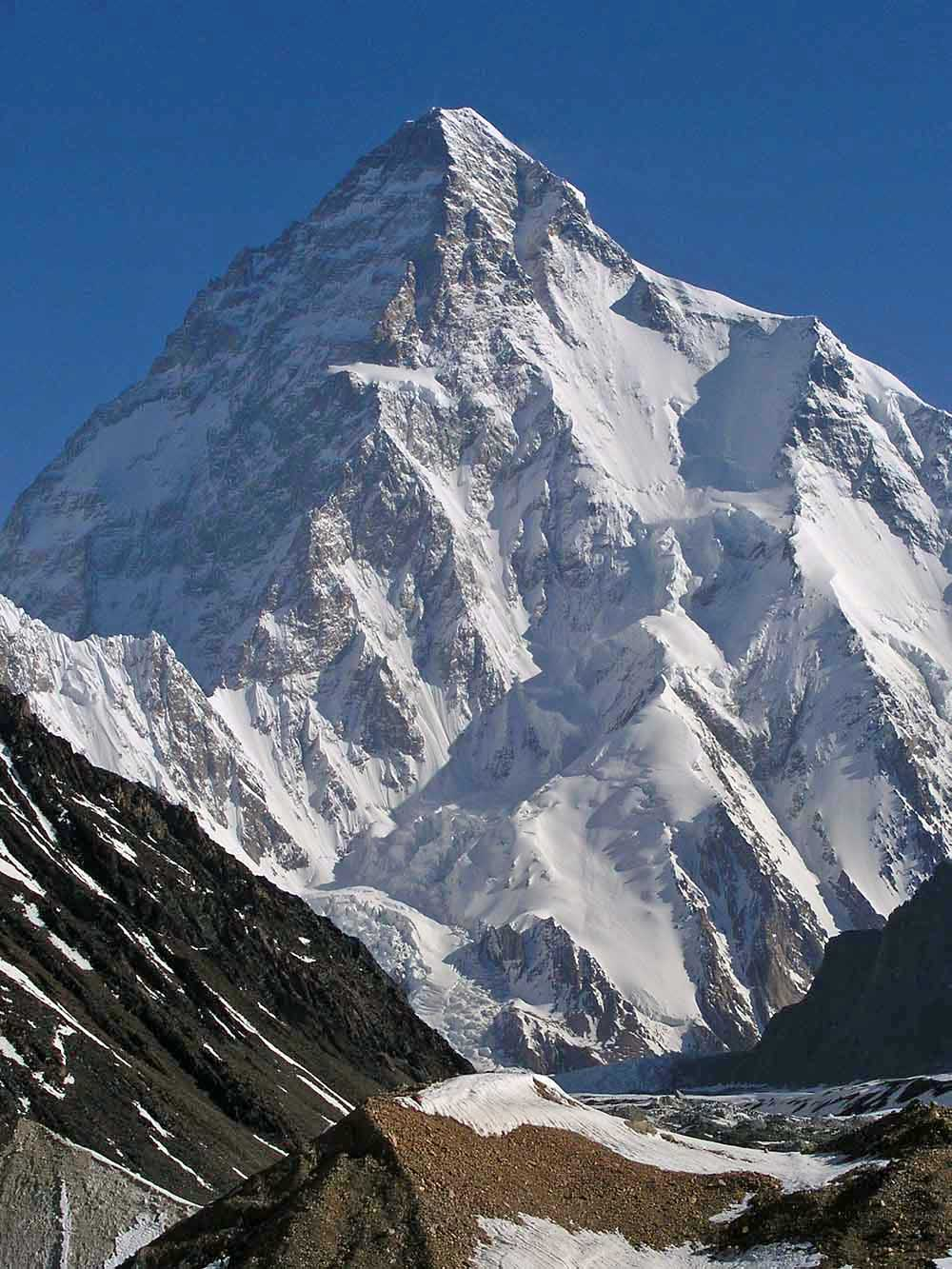
K2, the destination of Mazzoleni's last climb

=== K2 expedition ===
In 1996, his mountaineering club the Grignetta Spiders led an expedition to K2 for the fiftieth anniversary of the group. On July 29, he reached the summit. As he was descending from the mountain, Mazzoleni fell to his death from the Shoulder (8,000 m). The circumstances which Mazzoleni fell are unknown, as he was behind his climbing companions when the accident occurred. The next day, his body was spotted by a member of his climbing team on a serac above 8,000 m.

Due to the difficulty of terrain and altitude of where he was found, he could not be reached by his expedition team and his body remains on the mountain.

=== Memorials ===
Mazzoleni was known for making close connections with the people in the communities around the mountains where he travelled to on his expeditions, taking thousands of photographs. After his death, two foundations were established in Mazzoleni's memory: the "Amici di Lorenzo", which opened a clinic in Pakistan, and "Namaste di Bulciago", which opened a school in Nepal and supports the local community. In 2008, the Ragni della Grignetta awarded the Cassin Award for Culture to the Amici di Lorenzo for their efforts to care for children in Askole. The organizations remain operational. Mazzoleni's photographs have been shown in a number of commemorative exhibitions after his death.

In 2013, reports appeared in Italy suggesting that a search expedition was being undertaken to find Mazzoleni's body and return it to his family. In response, his family issued a statement requesting that Mazzoleni should remain in his final resting place.

On July 19, 2024, Mazzoleni's backpack was found on K2, by an all-female Italian expedition 28 years after he fell to his death on the mountain. The backpack was brought to K2's Gilkey Memorial. No trace of Mazzoleni's body has been found.
