= Bel Paese (cheese) =

Semi-soft Italian cheese type

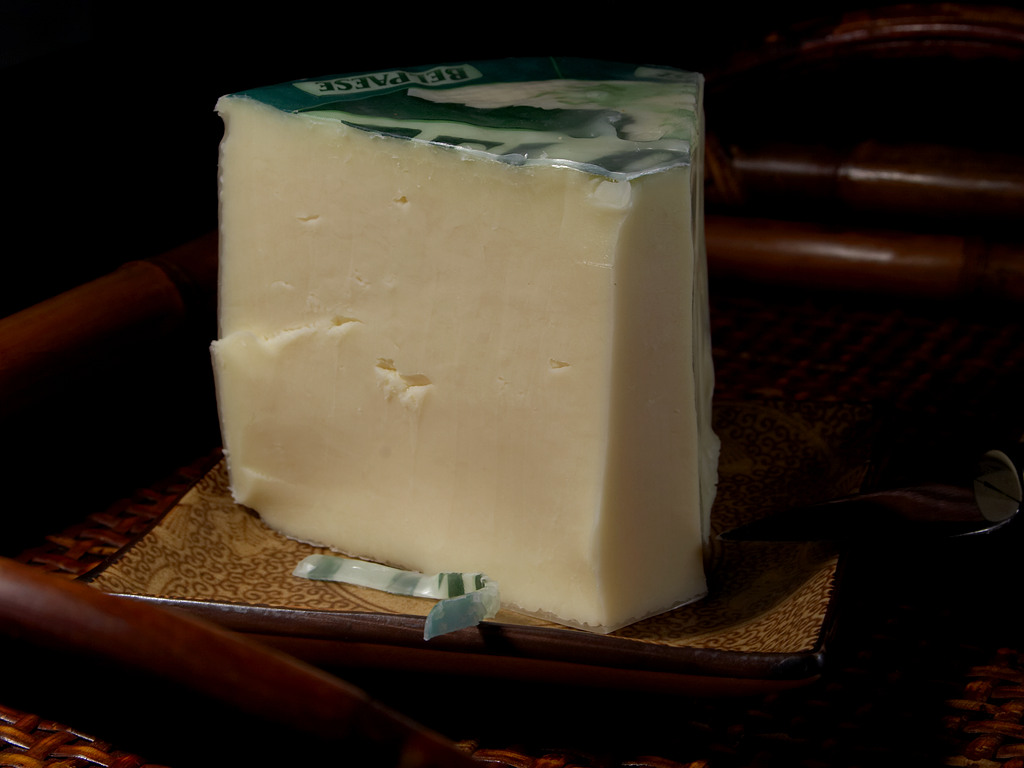
- Country of origin: Italy
- Region: Lombardy
- Town: Melzo
- Texture: semi-soft

Bel Paese (Italian pronunciation: [ˌbɛl paˈeːze]) or Italico is a semi-soft Italian cheese. It was invented in 1906 by Egidio Galbani who wanted to produce a mild and delicate cheese to sell mainly in Italy. The name Bel Paese comes from the title of a book written by Antonio Stoppani (though the reference is much older, being used by Dante and Petrarch). It is Italian for "beautiful country", and is used as a phrase for Italy itself.

Originally produced in Melzo, a small town near Milan in the Lombardy region, it is now made in both Italy and the United States. Bel Paese is a cow's milk cheese. It matures for six to eight weeks, and has a creamy and light milky aroma. The color is a pale, creamy yellow. It is made in small wheels, and is very similar to the French Saint-Paulin cheese and German Butterkäse. It has a mild, buttery flavor, and it has been popularly eaten with fruity wines, such as dry red or white. It is favored by many as a snack or dessert cheese and melts easily for use on pizzas or in casseroles. It is often used as a substitute for mozzarella cheese.

Genuine Bel Paese cheese can be determined by the wrapping. It has an image of the Italian geologist and paleontologist Antonio Stoppani, whose geological treatise Il bel paese gave its name to Galbani's cheese; but while on the wrapping of the cheese made in Italy Stoppani's image comes with a map of Italy, cheese made in the United States has a map of America.
