= Yendegaia River =

Coordinates: 54°48′14″S 68°53′15″W

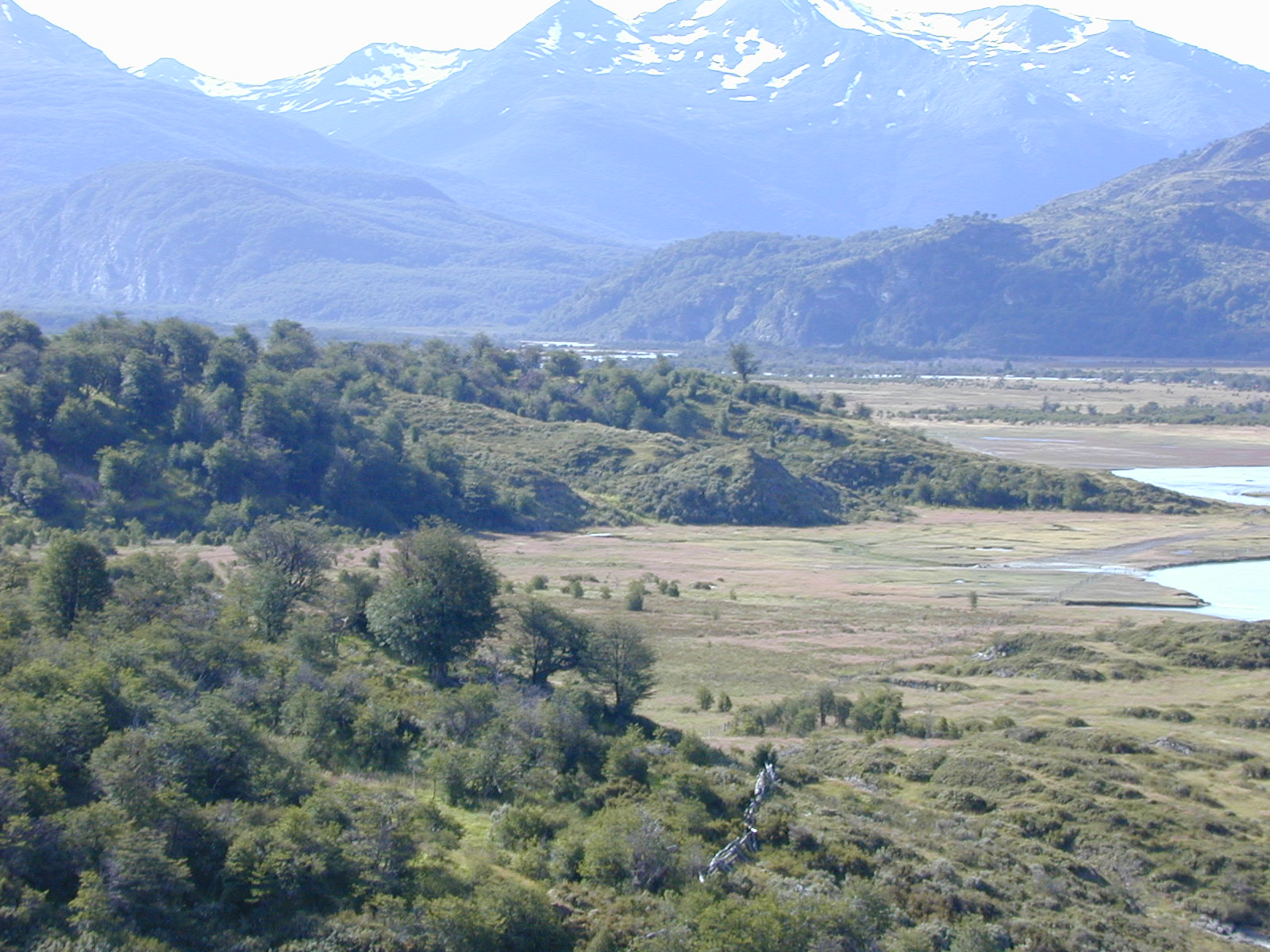
- Native name: Río Yendegaia (Spanish)

Location
- Country: Chile

Physical characteristics
- Source
  - location: Stoppani Glacier
- Mouth
  - location: Yendegaia Bay, Beagle Channel
  - elevation: 0 m (0 ft)
- Length: 13 km (8.1 mi)

The Yendegaia River originates from the terminus of Stoppani Glacier in Cordillera Darwin located at southwestern Isla Grande de Tierra del Fuego. It is part of Yendegaia National Park. It is approximately 13 km (8.1 mi) long and flows into the Yendegaia Bay.

== See also ==
- List of rivers of Chile
- Chile Route Y-85
