= Cordillera Darwin =

Mountain range in Chile

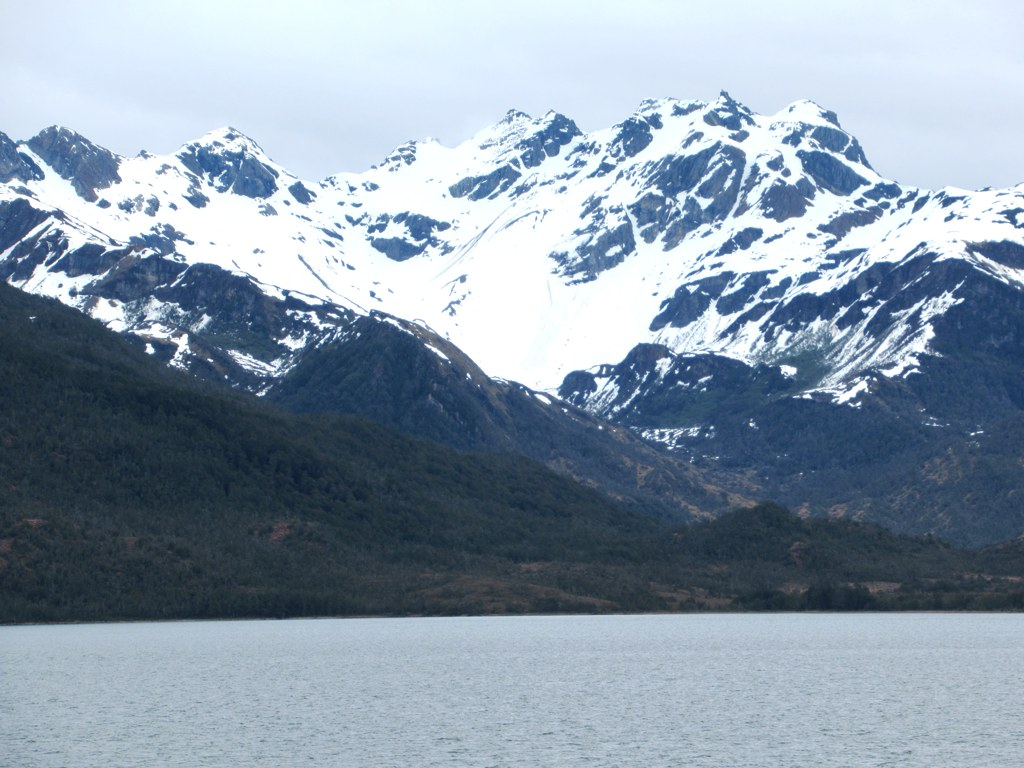

Highest point
- Peak: Monte Shipton

Geography
- Location within Southern Patagonia
- Country: Chile
- State: Magallanes Region
- Range coordinates: 54°45′S 69°29′W

The Cordillera Darwin is an extensive mountain range, the southernmost portion of the Andes, mantled by an ice field that is located in Chile.

== Description ==
Cordillera Darwin is located in the southwestern portion of Isla Grande de Tierra del Fuego, entirely within the Chilean territory. It is part of the longest Andes range and includes the highest mountains in Tierra del Fuego, with elevations reaching over 2,000 m (6,600 ft); The ice field of the Cordillera Darwin covers an area greater than 2,300 square kilometres (890 sq mi). The Darwin Range extends in a west–east direction from the Monte Sarmiento (located in the vicinity of Magdalena Channel) to Yendegaia Valley. It is bounded by the Almirantazgo Fjord on the north and the Beagle Channel on the south. The range is named after Charles Darwin and is the most important feature of Alberto de Agostini National Park, which includes a number of well-known glaciers including the Marinelli Glacier, which is now under prolonged retreat as of 2008.

In October 2011, a team of French mountaineers from the French Army's Groupe Militaire de Haute Montagne announced the first crossing of the Cordillera Darwin in a 29-day trip which included the second ascent of Mount Darwin.

== Geology ==
The Cordillera Darwin metamorphic core complex is a geological complex composed mainly of metamorphic rocks. It has been suggested to be analogous to the Eastern Andes Metamorphic Complex. The Cordillera Darwin metamorphic complex is the only metamorphic complex in the southern Andes known to have amphibolite facies rocks containing kyanite and sillimanite, evidence of high-grade metamorphism. This took place during the Cretaceous, presumably in association with the closure of the Rocas Verdes basin.

The protoliths of the Cordillera Darwin metamorphic complex are not related to the Tierra del Fuego igneous and metamorphic complex, despite the present-day proximity.

== Major peaks ==
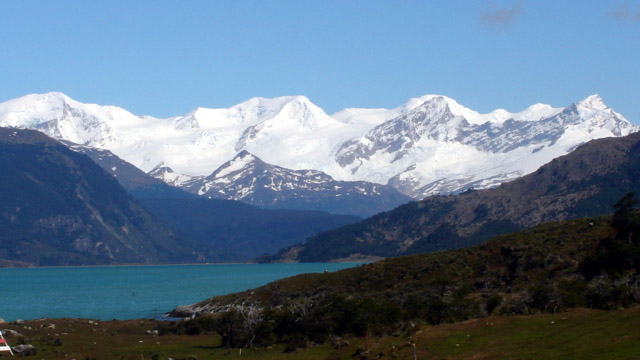
Stoppani Glacier in Cordillera Darwin

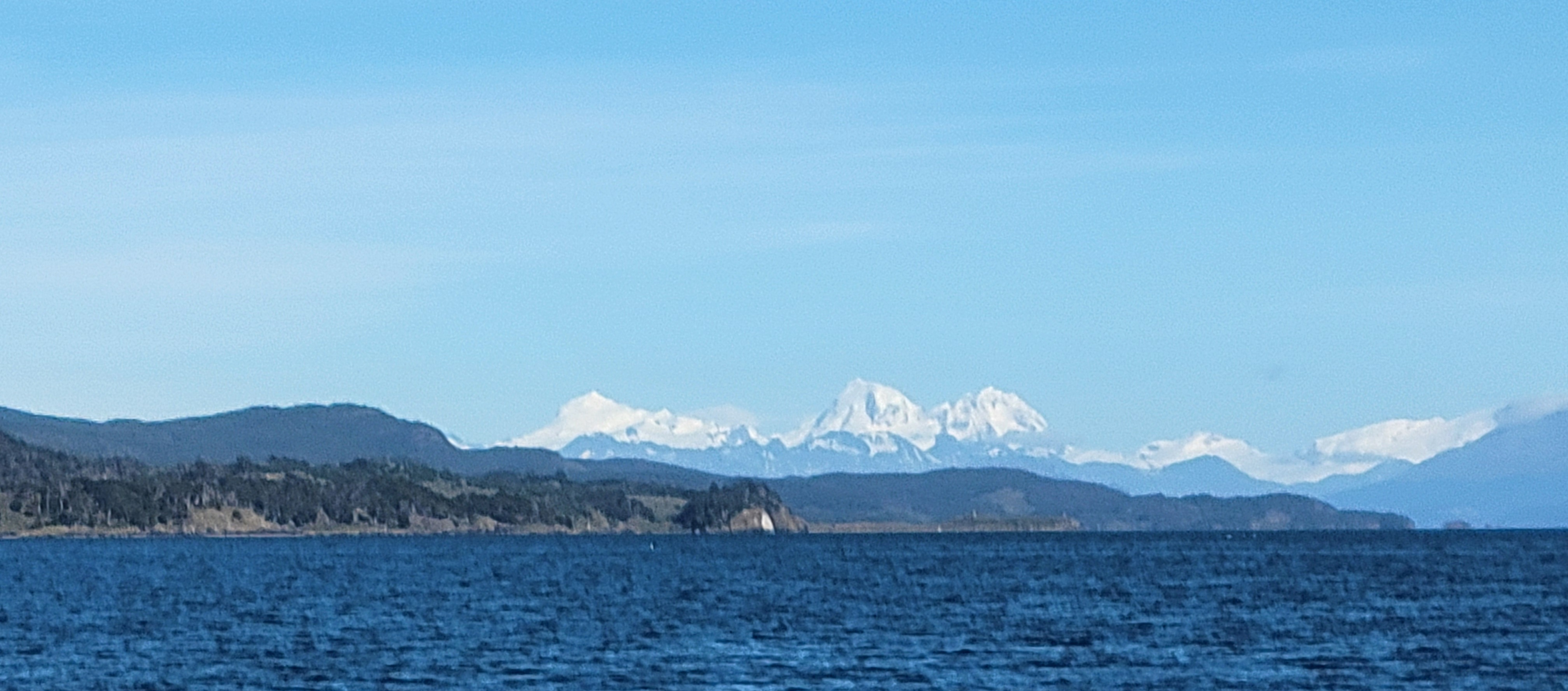
- Monte Frances, Monte Bove, and Monte Roncagli (left to right) dominating the eastern Cordillera Darwin. Seen from the Beagle Channel (looking west), with Isla Navarino in the foreground.
  Monte Shipton
- Monte Darwin
- Monte Sarmiento
- Monte Italia
- Monte Frances
- Monte Bove
- Monte Roncagli
- Monte Luis de Saboya
- Monte Della Vedova
- Monte Buckland

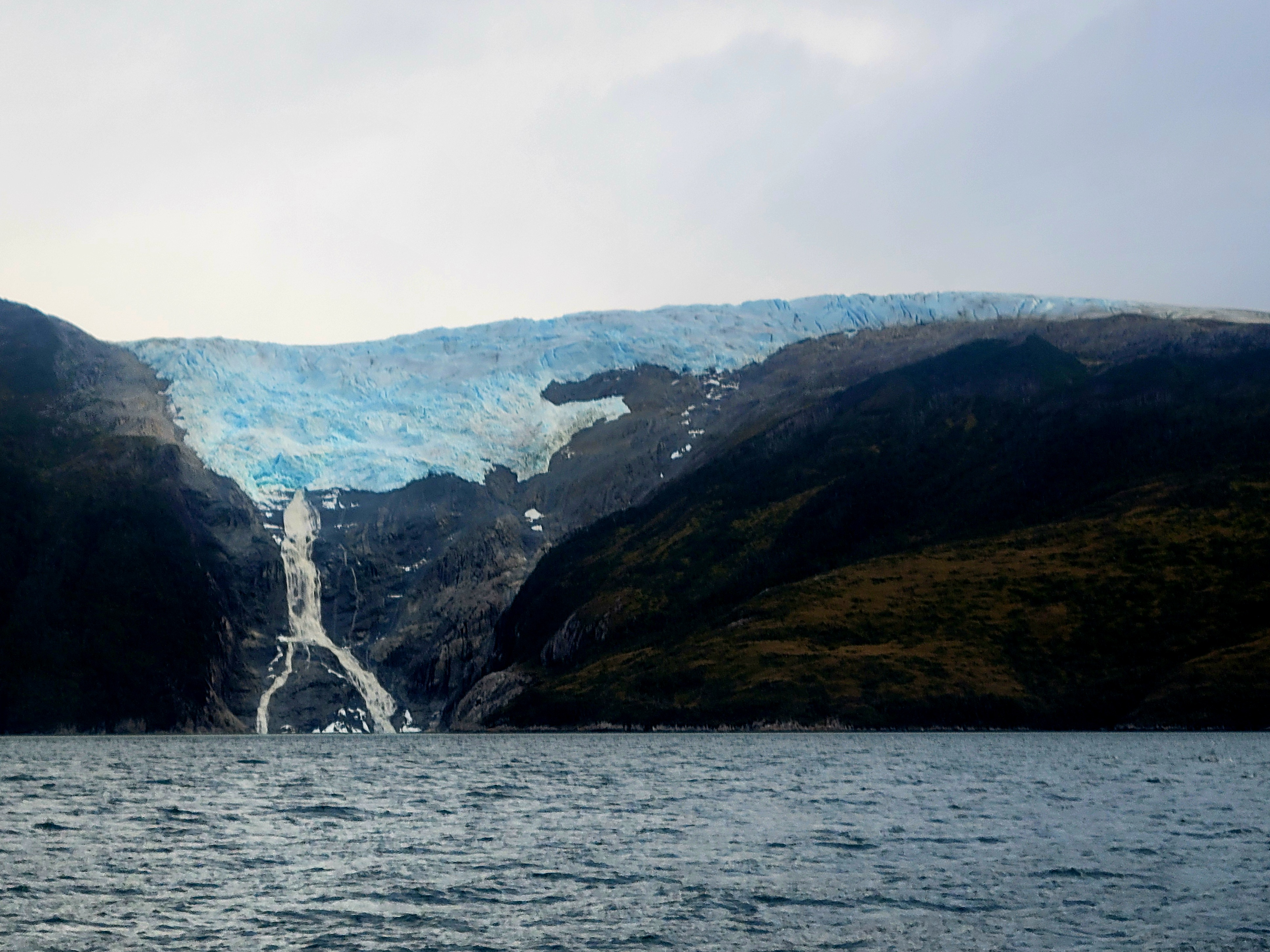
Mouth of the Romanche Glacier south of Monte Darwin.

== Other peaks ==
While most major peaks (by elevation) have been climbed, many of the other peaks in the Cordillera Darwin have not seen any reported ascents as of 2020.

== See also ==
- Ainsworth Bay, Chile
- Cordillera Darwin Metamorphic Complex
