= Monte Bove (Chile) =

Mountain in Chile

Bove
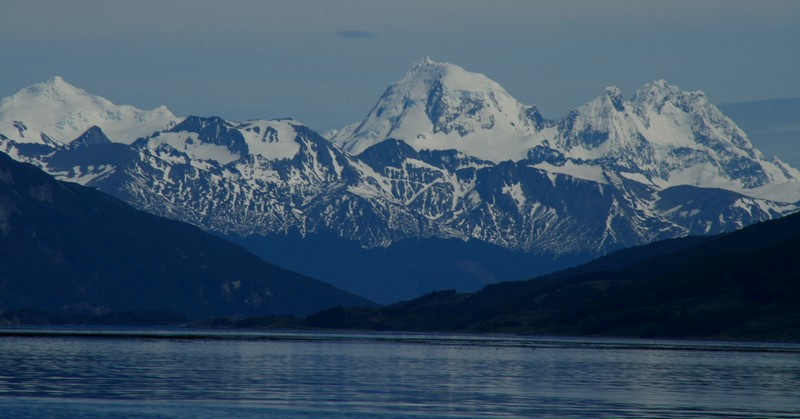
- From left to right: Monte Francés, Monte Bove and Monte Roncagli. A minor peak between Monte Bove and Roncagli is named Monte Ada.

Highest point
- Elevation: 7,546 ft (2,300 m)
- Coordinates: 54°51′48″S 69°05′33″W

Geography
- Country: Chile
- Parent range: Andes

Climbing
- First ascent: 1963 by Eric Shipton, John Earle, Claudio Cortés and Peter Bruchhausen

Monte Bove is an ice-capped mountain at the eastern end of the Cordillera Darwin, Chile. The summit was reached for the first time in 1963 by a team led by Eric Shipton. The second recorded ascent of Monte Bove was made in 1990.
