= Marinelli Glacier =

Glacier in Chile

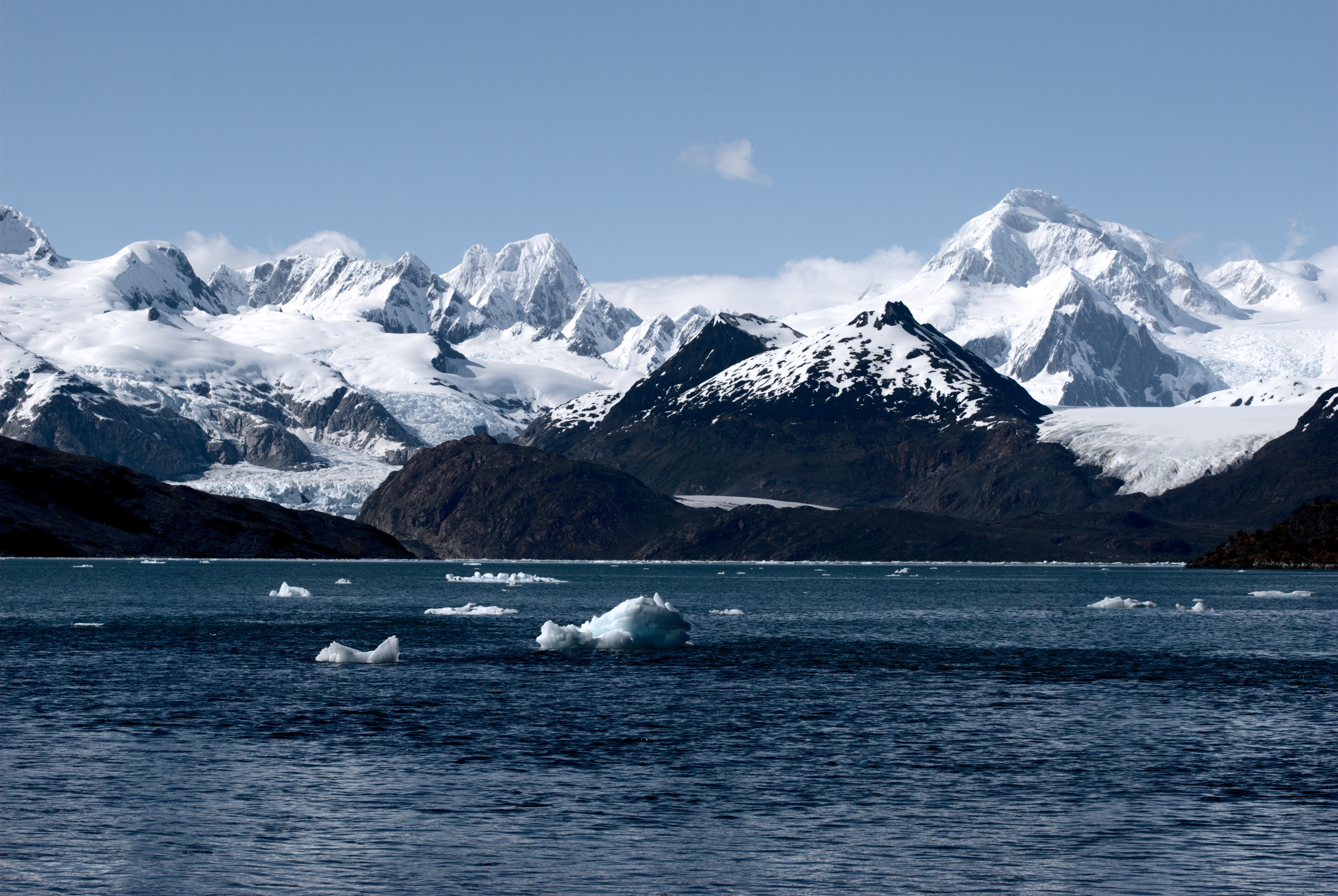
- Ainsworth bay and Marinelli Glacier
- Interactive map of Marinelli Glacier
- Type: Tidewater glacier
- Location: Chile
- Coordinates: 54°32′S 69°34′W
- Area: 142 km^{2} (55 sq mi)
- Status: Retreating

Marinelli Glacier is a tidewater glacier located in Alberto de Agostini National Park, Isla Grande de Tierra del Fuego. The glacier spills out from the backbone of the Cordillera Darwin and calves into Ainsworth Bay, an embayment of the Almirantazgo Fjord. The Marinelli Glacier is in a state of retreat, beginning at least as early as 1960 and continuing to the present time. Meltwater of Marinelli glacier discharges to form the headwaters of Marinelli Creek.

== See also ==
- Retreat of glaciers since 1850
