= Monte Buckland =

Mountain in Chile

Buckland
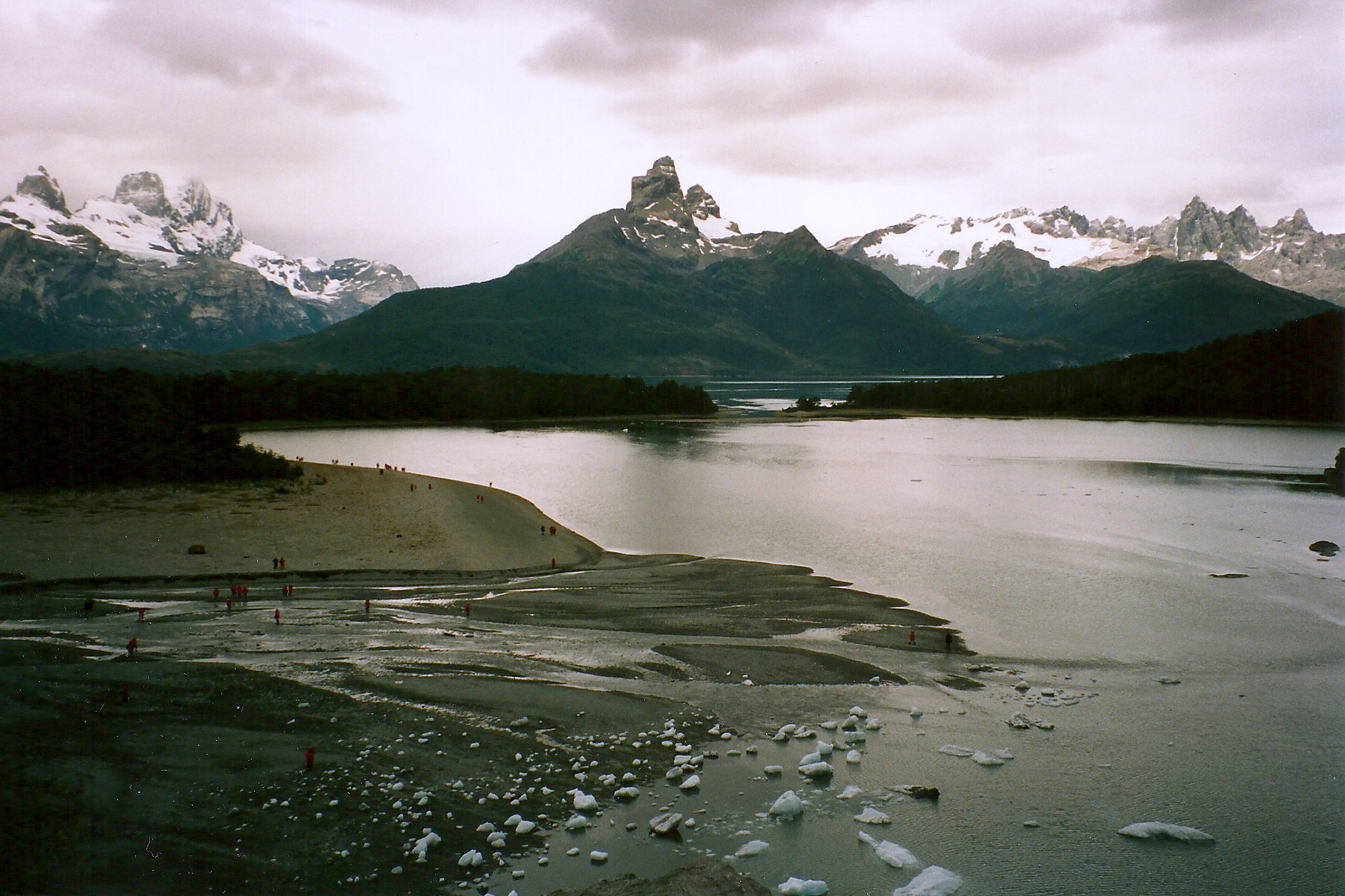
- Monte Buckland (left) with its summit covered with clouds. At the center of the image is Monte Sella.

Highest point
- Elevation: 1,746 m (5,728 ft)
- Coordinates: 54°22′36″S 70°21′41″W

Geography
- Location: Chile
- Parent range: Andes

Climbing
- First ascent: 1966 by Carlo Mauri and party. 2012 by Robert Koschitzki and party.

Monte Buckland is a prominent peak in Alberto de Agostini National Park, in the Chilean portion of Tierra del Fuego. It towers over a narrow peninsula between Agostini Fjord and Fitton bay, which is an eastward projection of the Gabriel Channel, which separates Dawson Island from Isla Grande de Tierra del Fuego. The mounts Sella, Aosta and Giordano are located to the southeast of Mt Buckland and have distinctive shapes.

Phillip Parker King's description of the mountain:

Close to the east end of the Gabriel Channel is Mount Buckland, a tall obelisk-like hill, terminating in a sharp needlepoint, and lifting its head above a chaotic mass of 'reliquiæ diluvianæ,' covered with perpetual snow, by the melting of which an enormous glacier on the leeward, or north-eastern side, has been gradually formed.

Monte Buckland was climbed in 2012 by a German expedition after several decades since its first ascent.
