= Alberto Maria de Agostini =

Italian explorer (1883–1960)

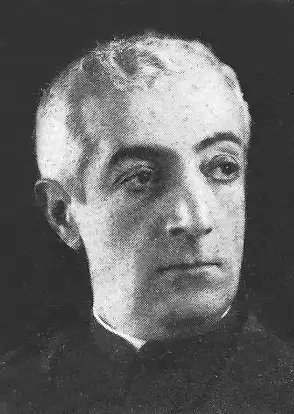

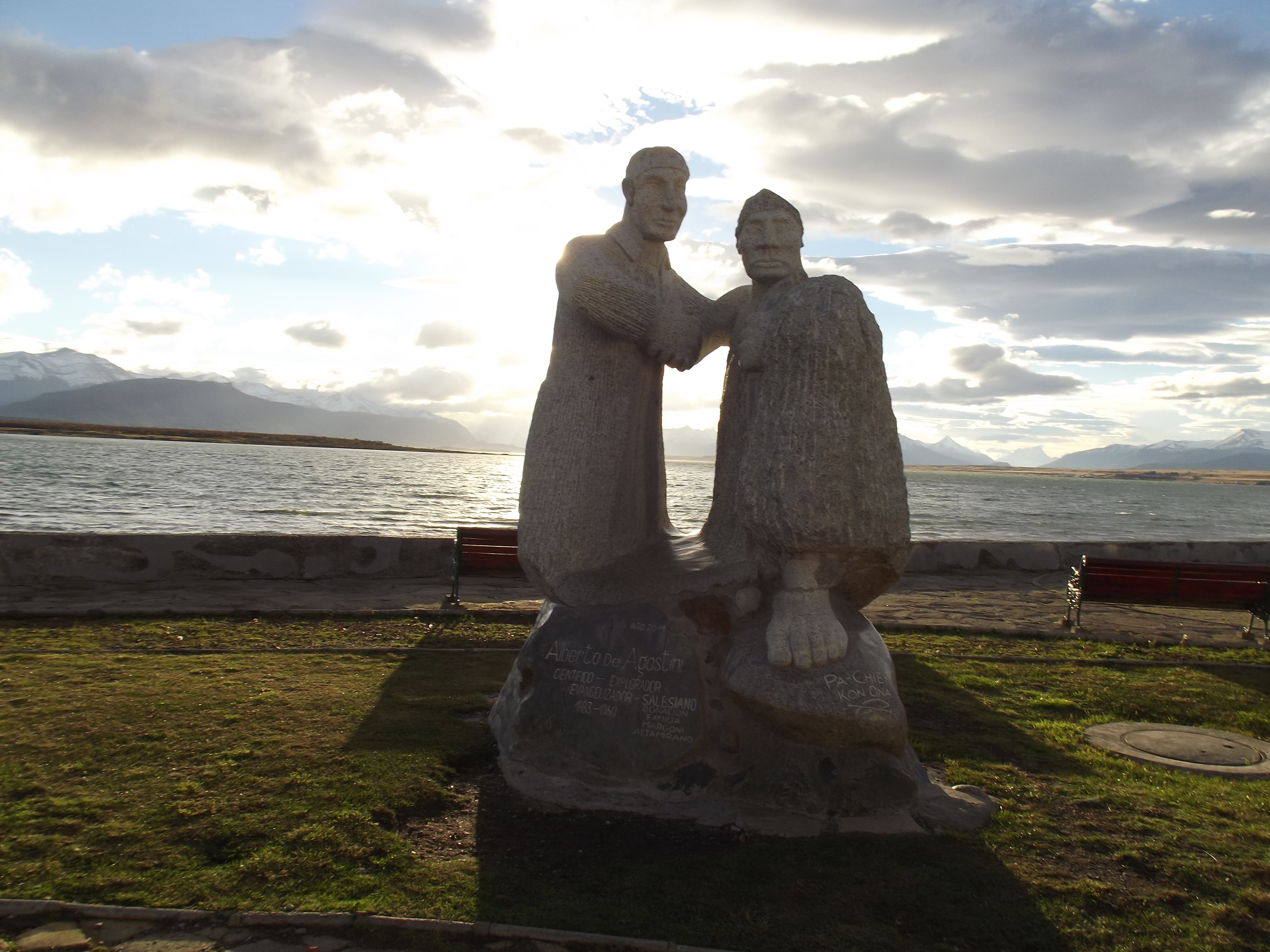
Statue of Alberto Maria de Agostini

Father Alberto Maria de Agostini (2 November 1883 – 25 December 1960) born in Pollone, Piedmont was an Italian missionary of the Salesians of Don Bosco order as well as amountaineer, explorer, geographer, ethnographer, photographer and cinematographer.

== Life ==
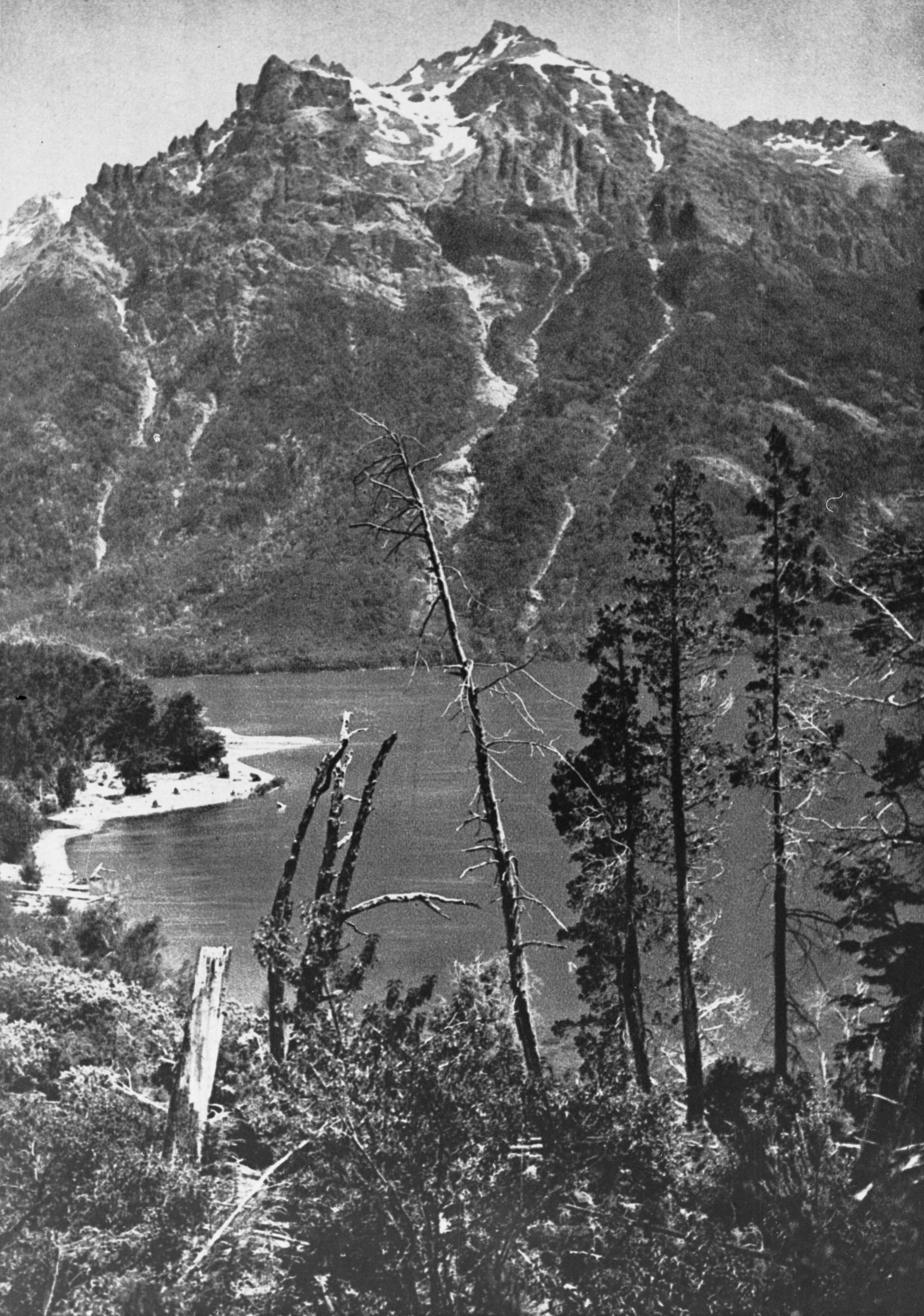
Gutiérrez Lake on photo by Alberto Maria de Agostini

De Agostini lived as a missionary in Tierra del Fuego and Patagonia, between Chile and Argentina, where he was the first person to reach several mountain peaks, glaciers and sea sounds; and discovered others, some named after him.

In January–February 1931 he, Egidio Feruglio, and the alpine mountain guides Croux and Bron, were the first to fully cross the Southern Patagonian Ice Field; they did it from Lago Viedma (Argentina) to the vicinity of Patagonian channels of the Pacific Ocean (Chile), and back.

In 1941, he was the first to write about Cueva de las Manos.

He also sustained a good relationship with the native people of Tierra de Fuego.

In addition he has left behind 22 books and written works in Italian, German and Spanish; a precious collection of several hundred photographs; and a documentary film; all of them on Patagonia and Tierra de Fuego and the Fuegian tribes.

He died in Turin on Christmas Day, 1960.

There is now an Alberto de Agostini National Park in the western part of Tierra del Fuego named after him.

== Published works ==
=== Books ===
- Guía Turística de Magallanes y Canales Fueguinos (1924)
- Guía Turística de los Lagos Argentinos y Tierra del Fuego (?)
- El Lanín y sus alrededores. Parque nacional (1941)
- Ande Patagoniche – viaggi di esplorazione nella Cordigliera Patagonica australe (1949)
- Trent'anni nella Terra del Fuoco (1955)
- Sfingi di ghiaccio (1958)

=== Films ===
- Terre Magellaniche (1933)

== Bibliography ==
- F. Surdich: De Agostini, Alberto Maria. In: Dizionario Biografico degli Italiani vol. 33 (online by treccani.it, Italian)

== See also ==
- Agostini Fjord
- Monte Sarmiento
