= Leonardo Marinelli =

Leonardo Marinelli was a Commander for the Guardia di Finanza in Tirano, Italy. In 1943, he greatly assisted in the liberation of Jews from an internment camp in Aprica.

== Liberation of the Jews ==
Leonardo Marinelli was a Commander in the Guardia di Finanza in 1943. He was stationed in Tirano and was in charge of the internment camp in Aprica. On September 12, Pope Pius XII sent Giuseppe Carozzi, a young Italian priest with a secret request. The Pope wanted Marinelli to liberate 300 Yugoslavian Jews from the internment camp and give them safe passage into Switzerland. Marinelli went against strict Nazi orders forbidding Jews, prisoners of war, or anyone who had not joined Benito Mussolini's northern Italian Republic of Salo from crossing the border, and that same night let them escape from the camp. Leonardo's diary states that he even ordered guards to help carry the belongings of the Jews. After four days of travelling through unbeaten paths, the prisoners, being primarily led by Carozzi and another priest, Cirillo Vitalini, along with the help of Marinelli, safely managed to cross into Switzerland.

== Escape to Switzerland ==
Following the escape of the Jewish prisoners, the Nazis, who had not yet mobilized in that region, began sending more and more troops in an effort to stop illegal border crossings. They also put into effect a decree which proclaimed that anyone helping the Jews would be put to death. A captain from the SS confronted Marinelli, asking for collaboration and information. Marinelli agreed to his requests, and the SS captain left. Marinelli, seeing the upcoming danger, decided it was best to leave. On the 22 of September, of that same year, Marinelli, along with his family, fled to Switzerland. He remained in a refugee camp until 4 July 1945.

== References (MLA) ==
- "Gli Auti Ai Profughi Ebrei Ed Ai Perseguitati." Guardia Di Finanza. Guardia Di Finanza. Web. 18 April 2010.
- Luciani, Luciano, and Gerardo Severino. Gli Aiuti Ai Profughi Ebrei E Ai Perseguitati. Rome: Museo Storico Della Guardia Di Finanza, 2005. Print.
- Marchione, Margherita. Man of Peace: Pope Pius XII. New York: Paulist, 2004. Print.
- "Pope Pius XII." Jewish Virtual Library. American-Israeli Cooperative Enterprise. Web. 18 April 2010.
