= Azopardo River =

Coordinates: 54.4739°S 68.9731°W

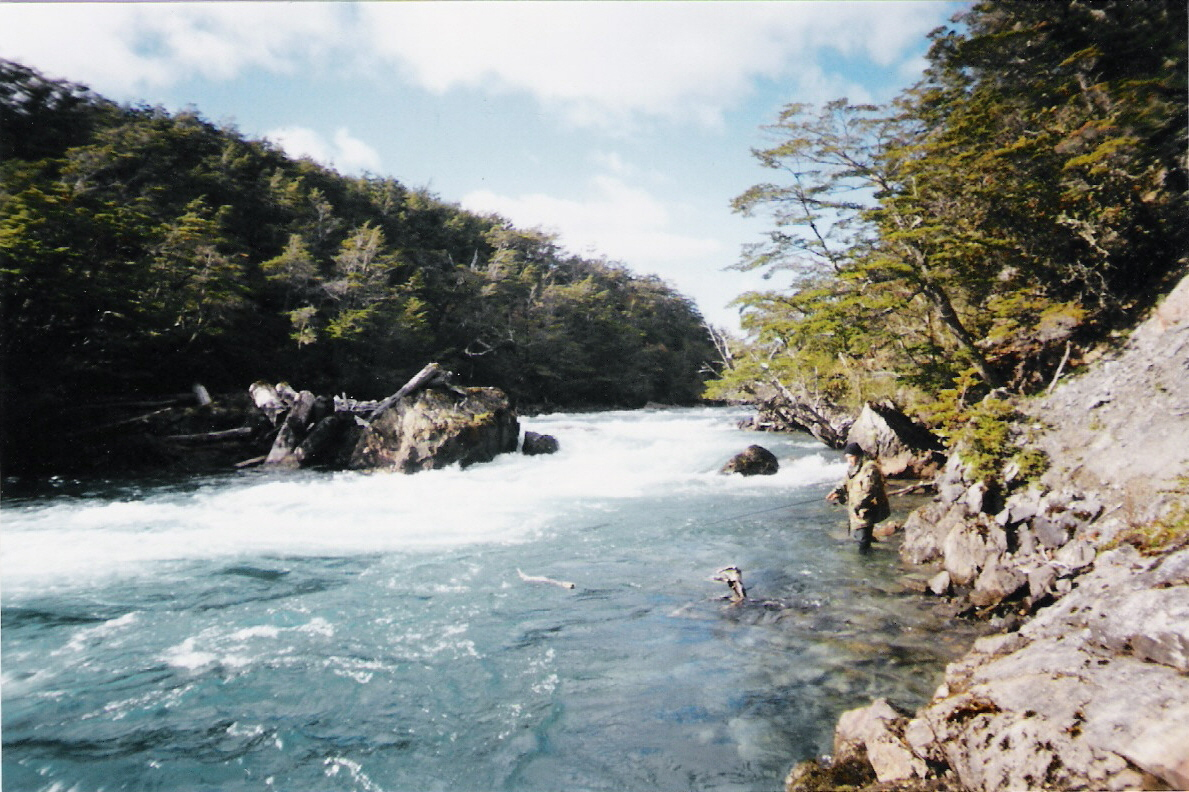
- Native name: Río Azopardo (Spanish)

Location
- Country: Chile

Physical characteristics
- Source
  - location: Cami Lake (also called Fagnano Lake)
  - elevation: 140 m (460 ft) (see Cami Lake)
- Mouth
  - location: Almirantazgo Fjord (Pacific Ocean)
  - elevation: 0 m (0 ft)
- Length: 11 km (6.8 mi)

The Azopardo River (Spanish: Río Azopardo), is a river in Isla Grande de Tierra del Fuego, Chile at the southern tip of South America. It flows in a westerly direction and drains the waters of Fagnano Lake (also called Cami Lake) into Almirantazgo Fjord.

The Azopardo is the northern limit of Yendegaia National Park.

== See also ==
- Marinelli Creek
