= Marinelli Creek =

Watercourse in Chile

Marinelli Creek is a watercourse whose headwaters emerge from the melting of Marinelli Glacier in Tierra del Fuego, Chile. Marinelli Creek discharges to Ainsworth Bay, a notable inlet along the Almirantazgo Fjord. The Marinelli Glacier has been in a state of retreat since at least 1943, and the retreat continues to the present time of 2008.

== See also ==
- Southern elephant seal

== Sources ==
- C. Michael Hogan. 2008 Bahia Wulaia Dome Middens, The Megalithic Portal, ed. A. Burnham
- United States Geological Survey (USGS). 1999. Historic Fluctuations of Outlet Glaciers from the Patagonian Ice Fields
