= Almirantazgo Fjord =

Fjord in Chile

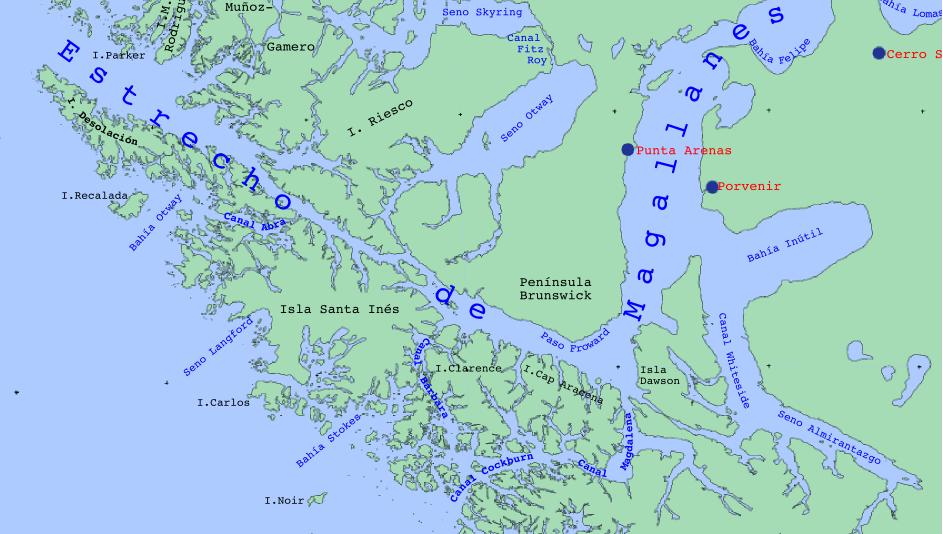
Riesco Island, R N Alacalufes

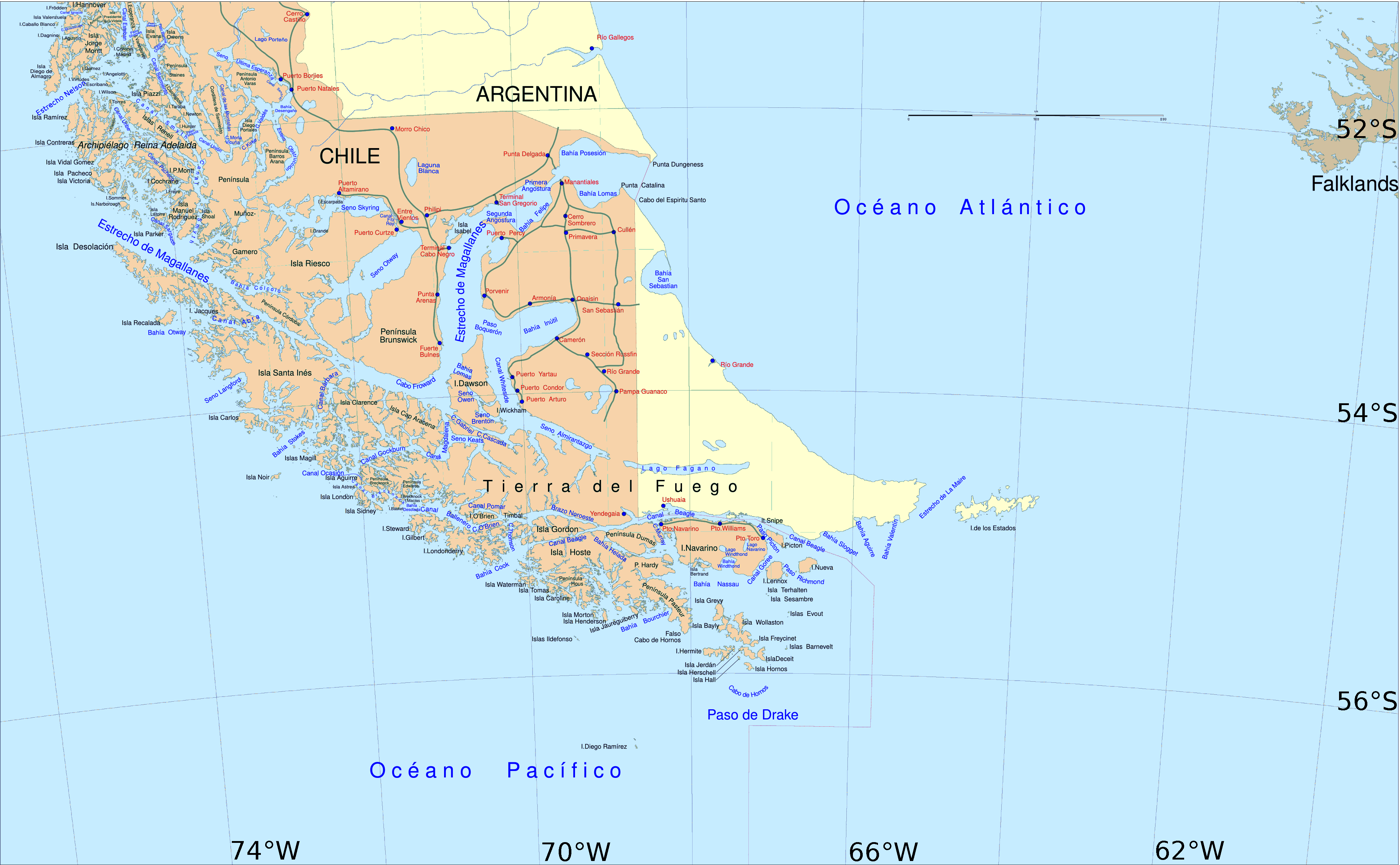

Almirantazgo Fjord in Tierra del Fuego (right, marked as Seno Almirantazgo).

Almirantazgo Fjord (Spanish: Fiordo Almirantazgo), also known as Almirantazgo Sound (Spanish: Seno Almirantazgo) or Admiralty Sound, is a Chilean fjord located in the far south of the country at 54°19′S 69°30′W. The fjord cuts deeply into the west coast of the Isla Grande de Tierra del Fuego, extending southeastwards from the Whiteside Channel, which separates Isla Grande from Dawson Island. On its south side several smaller fjords and bays make significant indentations into the north coastline of the Cordillera Darwin. One of these, Ainsworth Bay, is home to a colony of elephant seals. Azopardo River empties into the head of the fjord.

The sound was discovered in 1827 by the British Captain Phillip Parker King and named after the British Admiralty.

== Geography ==
Ainsworth Bay, fed by the meltwater of Marinelli Glacier is a notable inlet along the Almirantazgo Fjord. The Marinelli Glacier has been in a state of retreat since at least 1960, and the retreat continues to the present time of 2008.

== See also ==
- Marinelli Creek
