= Yendegaia Bay =

Coordinates: 54°52′12″S 68°44′02″W

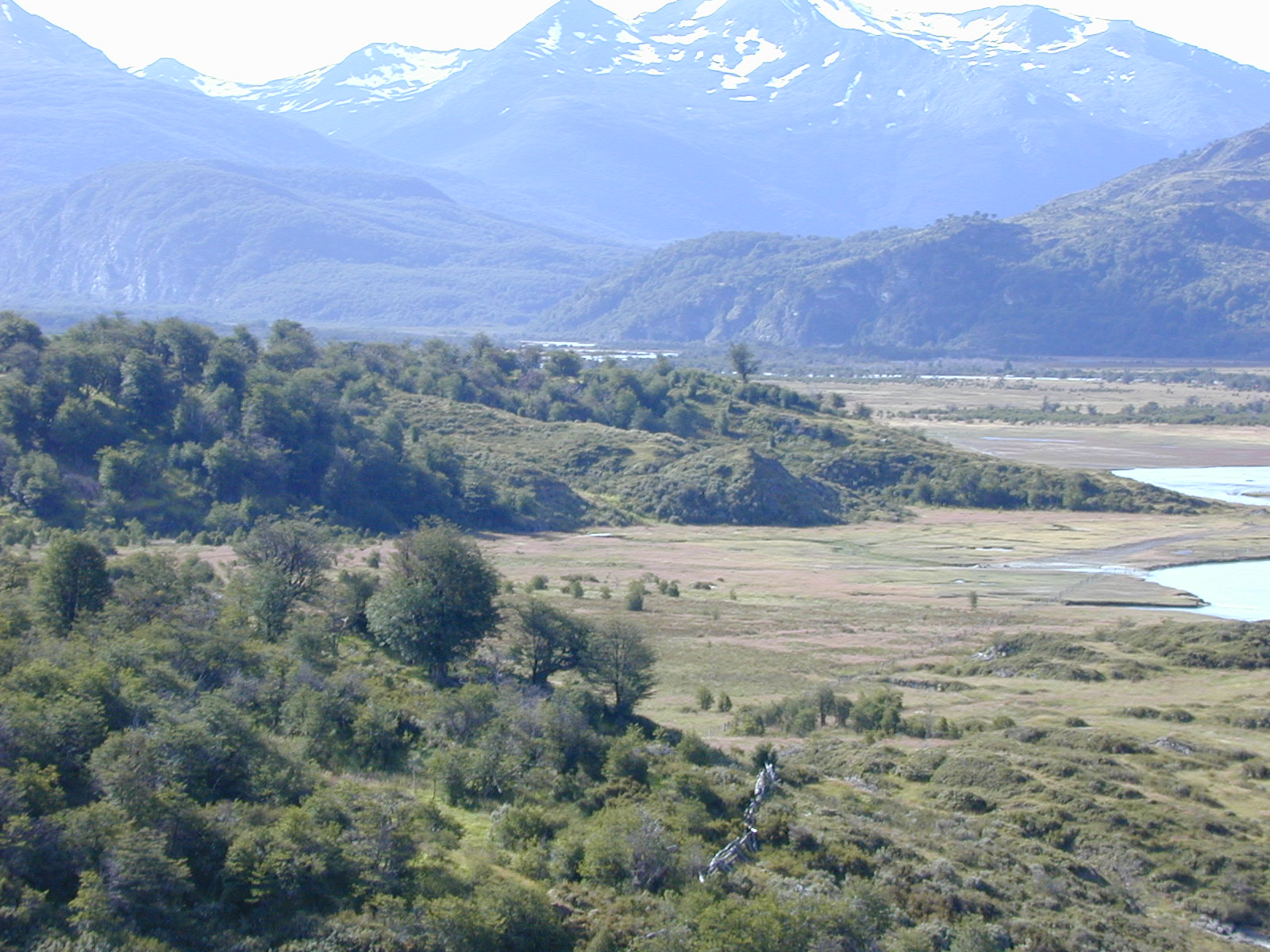
Valle de Yendegaia

Yendegaia Bay is a bay in the Beagle Channel, in the southern coast of the Chilean part of Isla Grande de Tierra del Fuego. The bay is at the mouth of Yendegaia River and the only settlement on its shores is Caleta Ferrari.

In 1998 the land around Yendegaia Bay was purchased by the Conservation Land Trust, a U.S.-based charity led by Douglas Tompkins. It is possible to trek from the bay to the Stoppani Glacier.

In August 2011 it was reported that the Chilean Army is building a road south from the Azopardo River to Yendegaia Bay, which will provide the first road access to the Chilean section of the Beagle Channel.
