= Antonio Stoppani =

Italian priest and scientist (1824–1891)

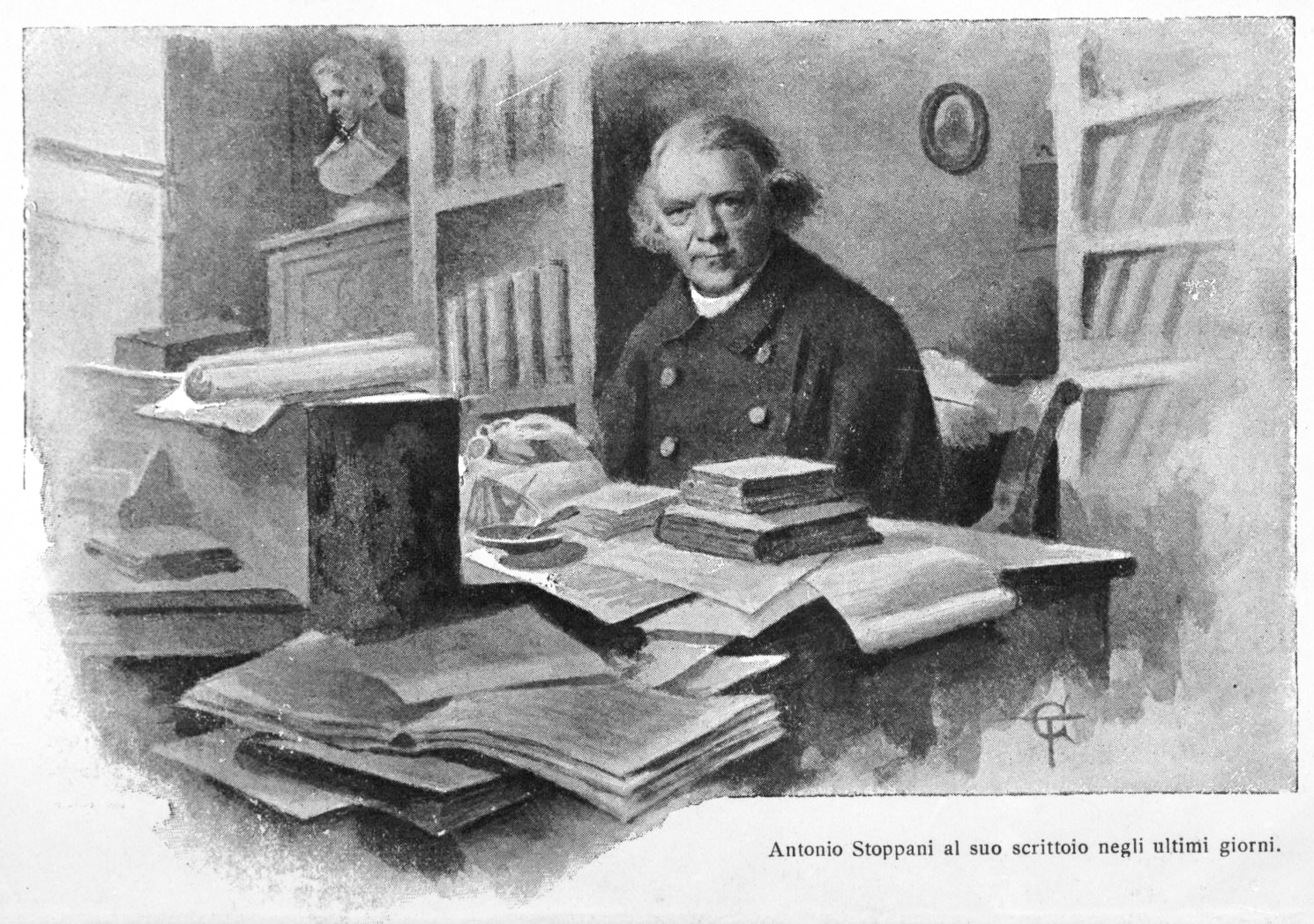
- Antonio Stoppani towards the end of his life
- Born: 24 August 1824; Lecco, Kingdom of Lombardy–Venetia (now in Italy)
- Died: 1 January 1891 (aged 66); Milan, Kingdom of Italy
- Education: Archiepiscopal seminary of Milan
- Known for: Anthropocene
- Scientific career
- Fields: Geology; Paleontology
- Workplaces: University of Pavia; Polytechnic University of Milan

Antonio Stoppani (24 August 1824 – 1 January 1891) was an Italian Catholic priest, patriot, geologist and palaeontologist. He studied the geology of the Italian region and wrote a popular treatise, Il Bel Paese (Italian for "the beautiful country"), on geology and natural history. He was among the first to propose a geological epoch dominated by human activities that altered the shape of the land.

== Life ==
Born in Lecco, Stoppani studied theology and became a priest in the order of the Rosminians. He was ordained in 1848, a year of turmoil with the Siege of Milan. During this siege, the Five Days of Milan, he became a hero for his role in the use of hot air balloons to send messages out of the besieged city. Along with Vincenzo Guglielmini, he ensured that the balloons could move over the walls of the city from the Seminario Maggiore di Porta Orientale and carry messages to rally the Italians against the Austrian Empire. He later became professor of geology in the Royal Technical Institute of Milan, and was distinguished for his research on the Triassic and Liassic formations of northern Italy.

Stoppani was important as a populariser of science. His most popular work, Il Bel Paese, conversazioni sulle bellezze naturali la geologia e la geologia e la geografia fisica d'Italia (1876) ("The Beautiful country, conversation on the natural beauty of geology and the physical geography of Italy"), after which Bel Paese cheese was named by Egidio Galbani (the wrapper for the cheese included a portrait of Stoppani). It presents, by means of 32 didactic, scientific conversations supposedly in front of a fireplace, ideas and concepts from the natural sciences, in language accessible to the average 19th-century reader. It was so popular that it went into 120 editions by 1920 and was a textbook in schools. It deals especially with geological curiosities and the beauty of the Italian landscape. He commented on Italians who "know almost nothing about the natural beauty of our country; yet take delight when someone calls it a garden" and that the English fall in love with just one thing and devote their energies, emotions, and life to arrive dead or alive at the summit of mountains. His introduction to natural history declared that "man should never disappear from nature, nor should nature disappear from man". Stoppani, like many other clergyman naturalists of the period, was a supporter of the concordismo, a school of thought that sought to find concordance between the teachings of the bible and evidence from geology. He promoted the idea that Catholics needed to learn science and that the bible was to be interpreted rather than taken literally. He was also an important figure in "Catholic Alpinism", a movement that sought to use mountains to tell God's glory. Stoppani was however a critic of the ideas of evolution that Darwin's publication had brought into Europe.

Stoppani's works on palaeontology and geology include:

- Paleontologie Lombarde (1858–1881)
- Les Pétrifications d'Ésino, ou Description des fossiles appartenant au dépôt triasique supérieur des environs d'Esino en Lombardie] (1858–1860)
- Géologie et paleontologie des couches a Avicula Contorta en Lombardie (1860–1865)
- Corso di geologia (3 vols, 1871–1873) [ vol. 1 | vol. 2 | vol. 3 ]
- Geologia d'Italia
  - Volume 1: Descrizione del terreni componenti il suolo d'Italia (1874)
  - Volume 2: L'Era Neozoica (1880)

In this last work, the author discussed the glaciation of the Italian Alps and the history of Italy during the Pleistocene age. Stoppani described several species of fossil molluscs while other fossil species have been named in his honour, including Fedaiella stoppanii Marini 1896 (a snail), Placochelyanus stoppanii Oswald 1930, Lymnaea stoppanianus Coppi, 1876 and Gyraulus (Gyraulus) stoppanii (Sacco, 1886). Most of his collections are in the Museo di Storia Naturale, Milano, the building of which he was responsible for constructing as director from 1882 to 1891. Stoppani Glacier in Tierra del Fuego is named after him.

Stoppani was the great-uncle of Maria Montessori, famous for her work on education; he was the uncle of Maria's mother Renilde. The Italian painter Giovanni Battista Todeschini (1857–1938) was his nephew. An oil painting of Stoppani made by Todeschini is held in the Public Museum at Lecco.

== Anthropocene ==
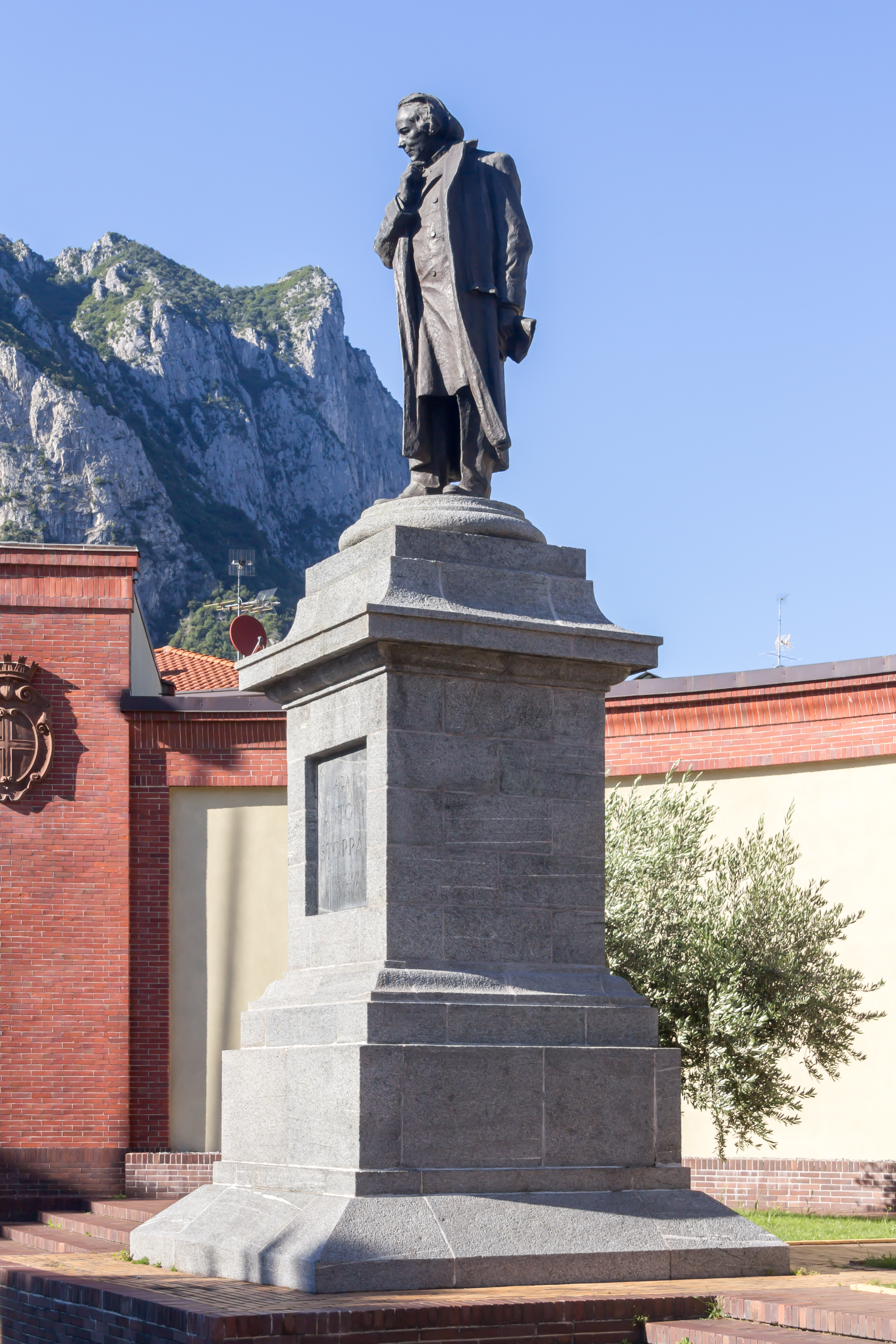
Monument to Stoppani in Lecco

In 1873 Stoppani acknowledged the increasing power and impact of humanity on the Earth's systems and referred to the anthropozoic era an idea that was possibly based on George Perkins Marsh who lived in Italy and whose work, Man and Nature, was translated into Italian in 1872. In a later edition of Man and Nature published as The Earth as Modified by Human Action in 1874, Marsh noted:

In a former chapter I spoke of the influence of human action on the surface of the globe as immensely superior in degree to that exerted by brute animals, if not essentially different from it in kind. The eminent Italian geologist, Stoppani, goes further than I had ventured to do, and treats the action of man as a new physical element altogether sui generis. According to him, the existence of man constitutes a geological period which he designates as the Anthropozoic era. ‘The creation of man’, says he, ‘was the introduction of a new element into nature, of a force wholly unknown to earlier periods’.

The idea of a new geological epoch, the anthropocene, was proposed in 2000 by Paul Crutzen and Eugene Stoermer. While some have pointed to the ideas of Marsh, Stoppani, Teilhard de Chardin and Vladimir Vernadsky (noösphere) as precursors, others have pointed out a distinction in the geological epoch proposed by Crutzen. Whereas the effects of man proposed in the past were small and gradual, the effects are sharply marked in Crutzen's anthropocene.
