= Farinelli (disambiguation) =

== People ==
- Carlo Maria Michelangelo Nicola Broschi
- Marcella Farinelli Fierro
- Piergiorgio Farinelli
- Roberta Farinelli

== In fiction ==
- Lucy Farinelli

== Works ==
- Farinelli (film)
- Farinelli (opera)
