= Stoppani Glacier =

Valley glacier in Chile

- Interactive map of Stoppani Glacier
- Type: Valley glacier
- Location: Chile
- Coordinates: 54°45′56″S 69°01′30″W
- Terminus: Yendegaia River

Stoppani Glacier is a valley glacier located in Alberto de Agostini National Park, Isla Grande de Tierra del Fuego. The glacier spills out from the backbone of the Cordillera Darwin and ends about 12 km (7.5 mi) from Yendegaia Bay giving origin to Yendegaia River.
