= Ainsworth Bay (Chile) =

Bay in Chile

Coordinates: 54.390°S 69.589°W

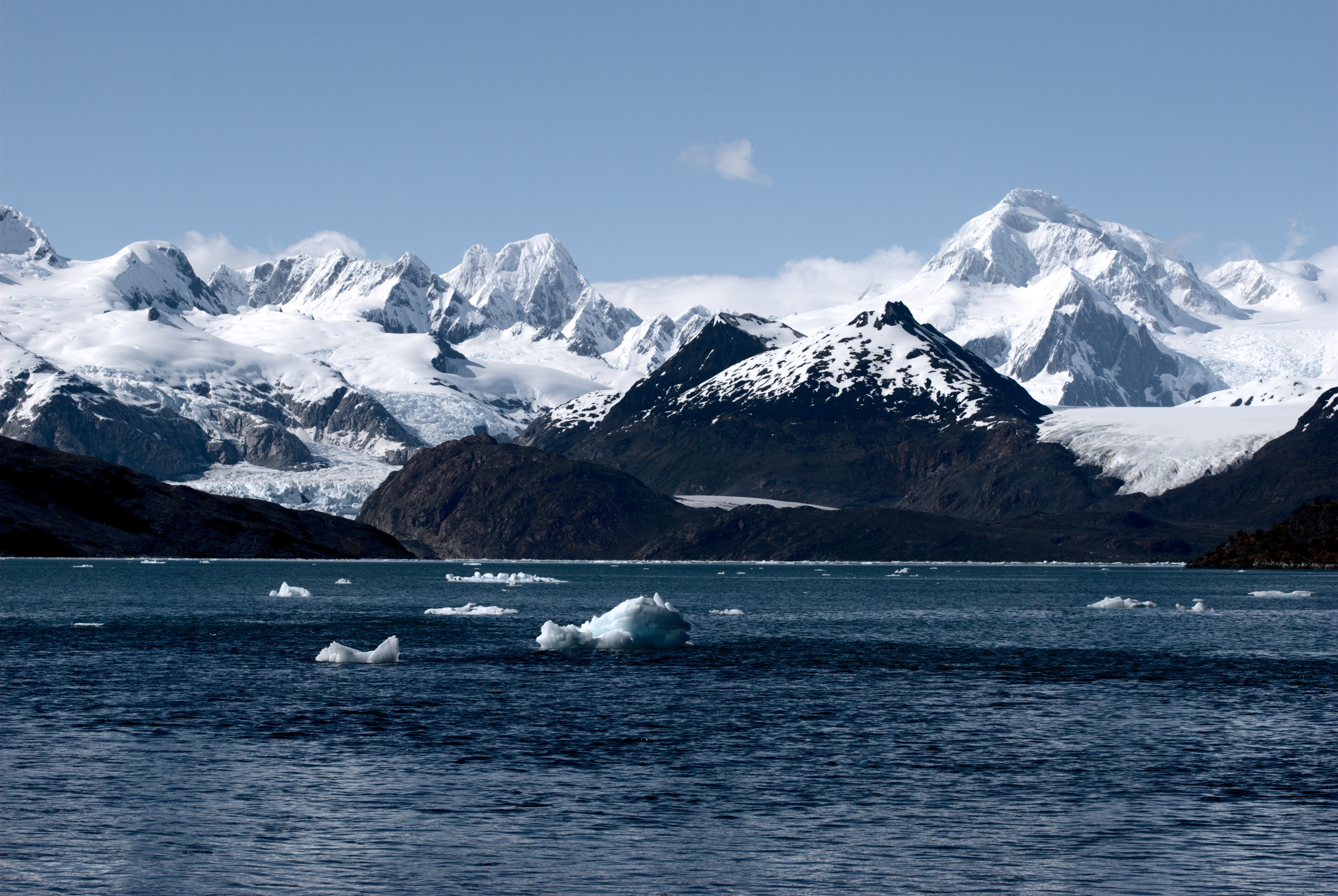
Ainsworth Bay and Marinelli Glacier.

Ainsworth Bay in the Tierra del Fuego region of Chile is a coastal inlet fed by the meltwater of Marinelli Glacier. The Marinelli Glacier is in a state of retreat.

== See also ==
- Southern elephant seal
