= USS Relief (1836) =

Cargo ship of the United States Navy

History

United States
- Name: USS Relief
- Builder: Philadelphia Navy Yard
- Laid down: 1835
- Launched: 14 September 1836
- Decommissioned: 1878
- Fate: Sold, 27 September 1883

General characteristics
- Type: Supply ship
- Displacement: 468 long tons (476 t)
- Length: 109 ft (33 m)
- Beam: 30 ft (9.1 m)
- Depth of hold: 12 ft (3.7 m)
- Propulsion: Sail
- Armament: 4 to 6 × 18-pounder guns; 2 × 12-pounder guns

The first USS Relief was a supply ship in the United States Navy.

Relief was laid down in 1835 at the Philadelphia Navy Yard and launched on 14 September 1836. Designed by Samuel Humphreys, she was built along merchant vessel lines and included trysail mast and gaffsail on all three masts to enable her to work to windward in strong winds. Her hull was pierced for 16 small guns, but she usually carried only four to six 18-pounder and two 12-pounders.

== Service history ==
=== United States exploring expedition ===
In early December 1836, Relief, commanded by Lieutenant Thomas A. Dornin, left Philadelphia for Norfolk, Virginia to join the ships assigned to the United States South Sea Surveying and Exploring Expedition. However, that expedition, held up by lack of money, ships, equipment, and trained personnel—and by administrative feuding since its first authorization in 1828—continued to be delayed until the summer of 1838. During her 19-month wait, Relief remained at Norfolk or engaged in runs along the east coast.

On 19 August 1838, the squadron, commanded by Lt. Charles Wilkes, cleared Hampton Roads and set a course for Rio de Janeiro. Sailing with the prevailing winds—westerlies and northeast trades—their planned course took them across the Atlantic to Madeira; then straight to Brazil. However, Relief, under Lt. A. K. Long, proved to be a slow sailer. She soon fell behind and was detached with orders to rejoin the other five vessels in the Cape Verde Islands. The rendezvous was accomplished in early October and the squadron sailed for Brazil. Relief, the last to arrive, reached Rio on 26 November.

On 6 January 1839, the squadron sailed for the Río Negro and Cape Horn. Relief, bypassing the former where surveys were conducted, rounded the Cape and reached Orange Harbor, on the Hardy Peninsula, Hoste Island, on the 30th. There for almost three weeks, her crew kept hourly registers of the tides, placed navigation lights, and cut wood. On 18 February, the others arrived and toward the end of the month they were dispersed on various missions. Two followed James Weddell's course to Antarctica; others traced James Cook's path. Relief was ordered north to the Straits of Magellan, via the Cockburn Channel, to survey harbors in the straits. Caught in storms, however, she was unable to penetrate the channel and, in mid-March, was almost wrecked off Noir Island. The loss of her anchor during her battle with the sea off Noir, prohibited further attempts to enter the channel and she headed for Valparaíso.

On 15 April she entered the anchorage to make repairs and await the remainder of the squadron which by mid-May was reunited. In June, they moved on to Callao, where the ships were refitted and replenished. When Relief was unloaded and smoked, her dead rats filled three barrels.

Because of her slowness, Relief was ordered to proceed from Callao to Sydney, then sail home—carrying the sick and malcontents with her. Sailing in mid-July, she spent two weeks in the Sandwich Islands (Hawaiian Islands) and three months after leaving Peru, put into Sydney. She discharged her remaining cargo, took on water, wood, and rock ballast and headed east. En route home, she again doubled Cape Horn and on 28 March 1840 she reached New York.

=== Further service ===
At the end of the year, Relief, repaired and overhauled, sailed again for the Pacific, where she remained for five years operating primarily off the west coast of South America. She returned to New York in April 1846. In May, war with Mexico broke out; and, in July, Relief joined the Home Squadron. From then until June 1848, she cruised in the Gulf of Mexico, attempting to maintain a steady supply line to the ships engaged in the blockade of the Mexican coast despite the distance to supply bases and the scarcity of ships of her type.

In July 1848, Relief returned to New York and in the fall sailed from Norfolk for the Brazil Station. The following spring, she was back at Norfolk, but, with the autumn, she headed east. She operated in the Mediterranean Sea until she returned to the United States in July 1850, and engaged in resupply runs to Brazil until placed out of commission for overhaul 20 November 1855. She recommissioned 19 February 1856 and resumed her runs to the Brazil Station and continued them through 1857.

In late 1858 she rejoined the Home Squadron and cruised in the Gulf of Mexico. In 1861, she crossed the Atlantic again, resupplied the African Squadron and, with the outbreak of the American Civil War, returned to the United States to resupply the ships of the South Atlantic Blockading Squadron. In July 1862, she returned to the Gulf of Mexico and, until the fall of 1863, served primarily as station store ship at Ship Island in Mississippi Sound.

Then ordered to Boston, Massachusetts for overhaul, she was decommissioned 5 December 1863. Recommissioned 29 April 1864, she was ordered back to the Pacific. In July she delivered supplies at Rio de Janeiro, whence she continued on to China, arriving at the Portuguese colony of Macau in December. After service on the Asiatic Station, she returned to New York in late 1866 and was placed in ordinary. In 1871 she was ordered to Washington, D.C., where she served as receiving ship until 1877. The following year she was laid up, at Washington, and on 27 September 1883 she was sold to J. B. Agnew.

== See also ==
- Union Navy
