= Dornin =

Dornin is the surname of:

- Bernard Dornin (1761–1836), the first publisher in the United States of distinctively Catholic books
- Peadar Ó Doirnín (c. 1700–1769), Irish poet and educator
- Robert Edson Dornin (1912–1982), United States Navy captain and World War II submarine commander
- Thomas Aloysius Dornin (1800–1874), United States Navy commodore
