= Romanche =

Romanche may refer to:

- Romanche Glacier, a glacier in Alberto de Agostini National Park, Chile
- Romanche (river), a river in south-eastern France
- Romanche Trench, a trench in the Atlantic Ocean
- The French language name for something of, from, or related to Romanshia, the Romansh language and Romansh people
