= Alberto de Agostini National Park =

National park of Chile

- IUCN category II (national park)
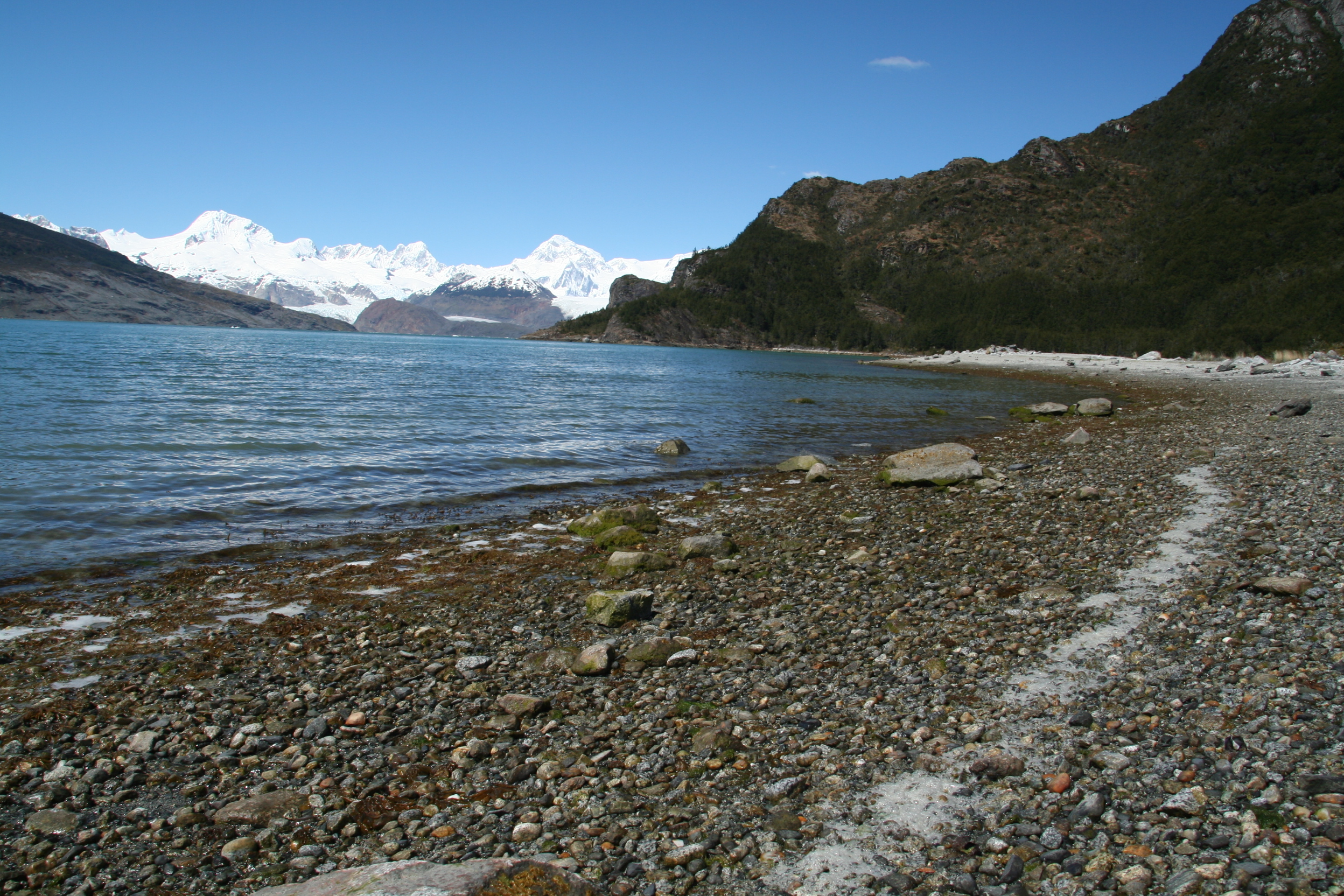
- Marinelli Glacier

- Location within Chile
- Location: Magallanes Region, Chile Chile
- Nearest city: Punta Arenas
- Coordinates: 54°44′57″S 70°26′23″W
- Area: 1,460,000 ha (3,607,739 acres)
- Established: January 22, 1965
- Governing body: National Forest Corporation (Chile)

Alberto de Agostini National Park (Spanish pronunciation: [alˈβeɾto ðe aɣosˈtini]) is a protected area that was created on January 22, 1965, on land that was formerly part of the "Hollanda" forest reserve and "Hernando de Magallanes National Park". It covers 1,460,000 hectares (3,607,739 acres) next to the Yendegaia National Park, and includes the Cordillera Darwin mountain range, which is the final land-based stretch of the Andes before it becomes a chain of mountains appearing as small islands that sink into the Pacific Ocean and the Beagle Channel.

The park, along with Cabo de Hornos National Park, was designated a Biosphere Reserve by UNESCO in 2005. As part of the Magallanes Sub-Polar (or Sub-Antarctic) Evergreen Rainforest, UNESCO highlights the area's "mosaic of contrasting ecosystems and unique and singular characteristics on a world level".

Several tidewater glaciers and steep fjords can be found in the park. It also comprises the Gordon, Cook and Londonderry islands, as well as part of Hoste Island (excluding the Hardy Peninsula and other portions).

== History ==
The park is named after one of the most important Salesian priests in Chilean history, Father Alberto Maria De Agostini. The Italian missionary, explorer, photographer and writer is known for his discoveries, photographs and maps of the region.

The region was visited by Charles Darwin, who encountered its native Fuegian peoples in the Murray Channel. Fuegian peoples include the Selkʼnam, Haush, Manekʼenk and Yaghan), the latter settling the lands along the channel approximately 10,000 years ago. The encounter would be of vital importance when the scientist sat down to write his theory on human evolution. Other areas of the park, such as the picturesque Agostini Fjord, were only discovered in the past century.

Alberto de Agostini National Park, along with Cabo de Hornos National Park, was named the Cabo de Hornos World Biosphere Reserve by UNESCO in 2005.

== Location ==
The park is 148 km (80 nautical miles) southwest of Punta Arenas, the nearest city, in Magallanes y la Antártica Chilena region, stretching over three provinces: (Magallanes, Tierra del Fuego and Antártica Chilena).

== Geography ==
The park features a highly irregular coastline, which is deeply indented by fjords. The centerpiece of the park is the Cordillera Darwin, whose slopes drop precipitously to the sea. The Darwin range is dominated by Monte Darwin and Monte Sarmiento. The valleys not filled by the sea are covered by glaciers, which also occupy small high plateaus.

== Geology ==
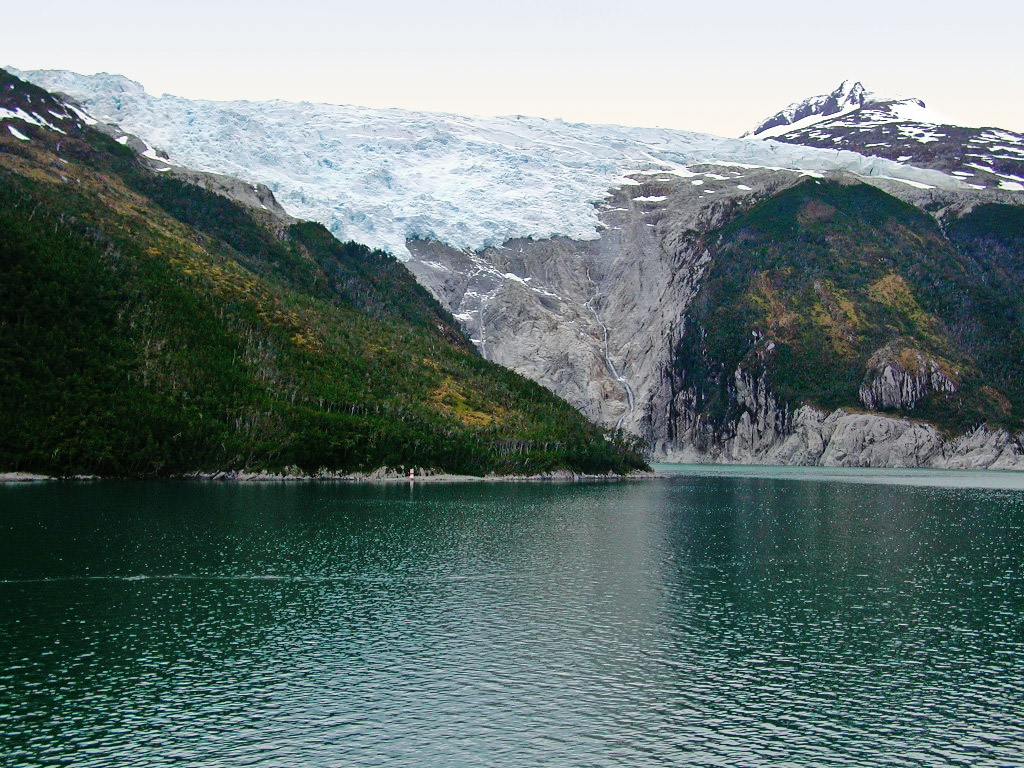
Romanche Glacier

Much of the landscape of the park has been sculpted by glaciers. The largest glacier is the Marinelli, which is in a state of retreat as of 2008. One of the most stunning portions of the park is the Seno Pía, an embayment of the Beagle Channel. The glaciers and mountains in this area form an amazing scenery, which also comprises the majestic Mount Darwin. Another glacier-related highlight of the park is the Avenue of the Glaciers, where the word avenue is used in a figurative sense describing part of the north-west arm of the Beagle Channel where it is possible to view several glaciers along the north shore. These glaciers are: España, Romanche, Alemania (also known as Roncagli), Italia, Francia and Holanda.

== Climate ==
Tierra del Fuego experiences extreme weather. The climate of the park is classified as subpolar oceanic climate and is wet, cold and windy.

== Biology ==
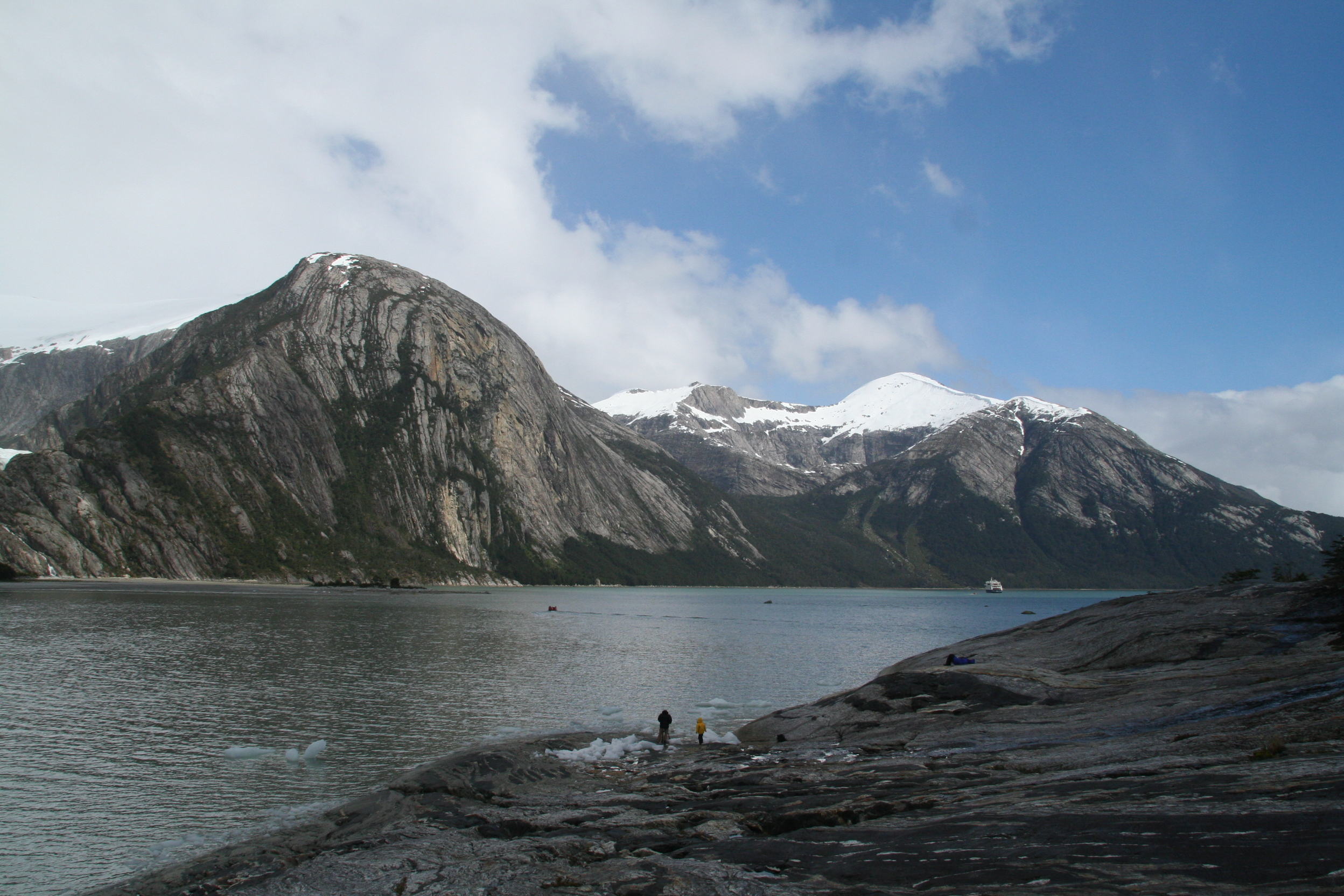
Seno Pía

=== Flora ===
The park is part of the Magellanic subpolar forests ecoregion. This pristine coastal ecosystem is home to various species of trees such as the coihue (nothofagus betuloides) and canelo (drimys winteri).

=== Fauna ===
Mammals found in the park include the Culpeo or Andean fox (lycalopex culpaeus), the South American gray fox (lycalopex griseus), also known as the Patagonian fox, the marine otter (lontra felina), known locally as chungungo, the South American sea lion, the southern elephant seals, the leopard seal (hydrurga leptonyx), the Chilean dolphin (cephalorhynchus eutropia, also known as the black dolphin or tonina), the Burmeister's porpoise (phocoena spinipinnis), Peale's dolphin (Sagmatias australis), the humpback whale (megaptera novaeangliae), and the guanaco (lama guanicoe).

Sea birds include the southern royal albatross (diomedea epomophora), the Magellanic woodpecker (campephilus magellanicus), the white-crested elaenia (elaenia albiceps), the cormorant, the austral thrush (turdus falcklandii) or Magellan thrush, among many others.

Alberto de Agostini National Park Fauna

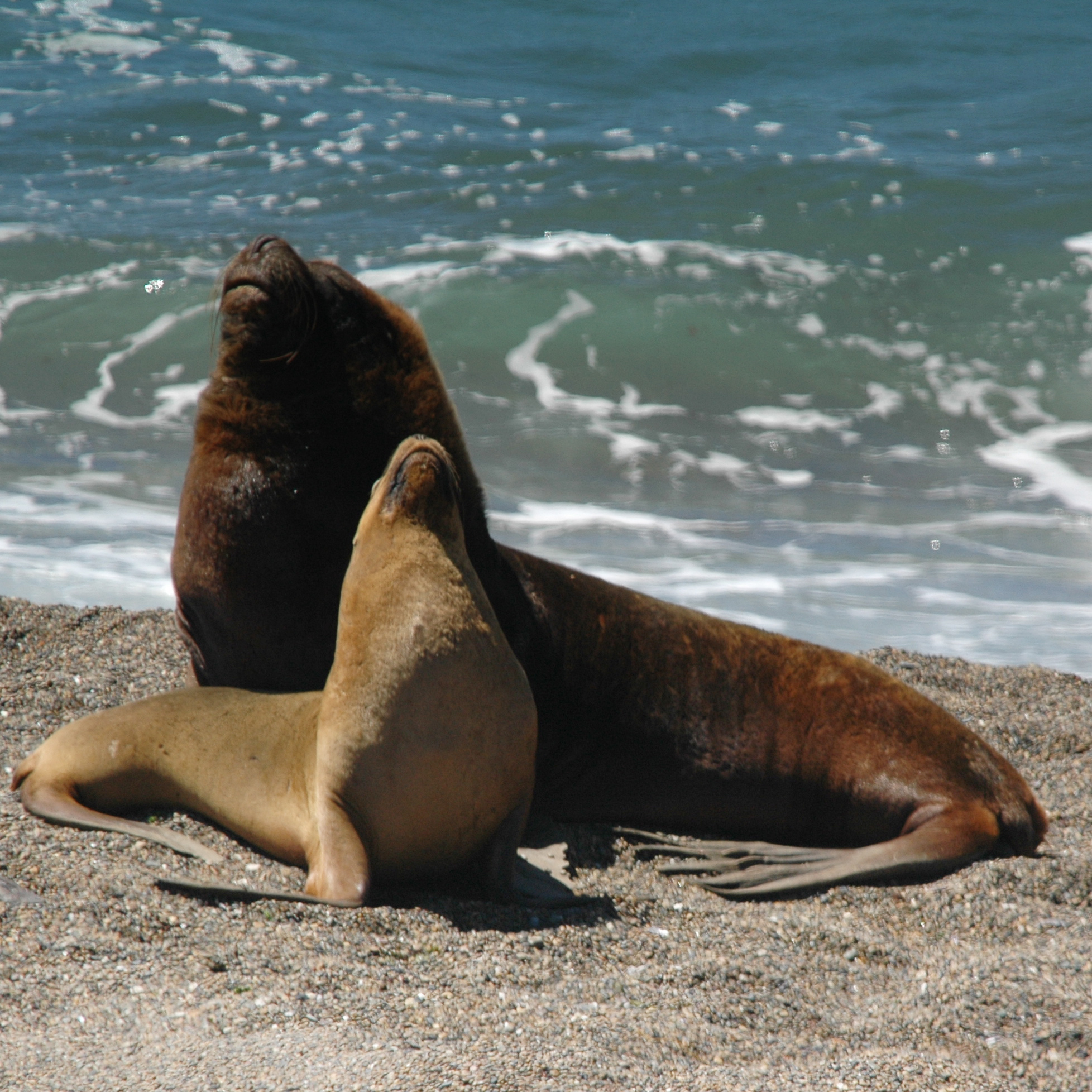
South American sea lion (otaria flavescens, formerly Otaria byronia), also known as the southern sea lion or Patagonian sea lion.

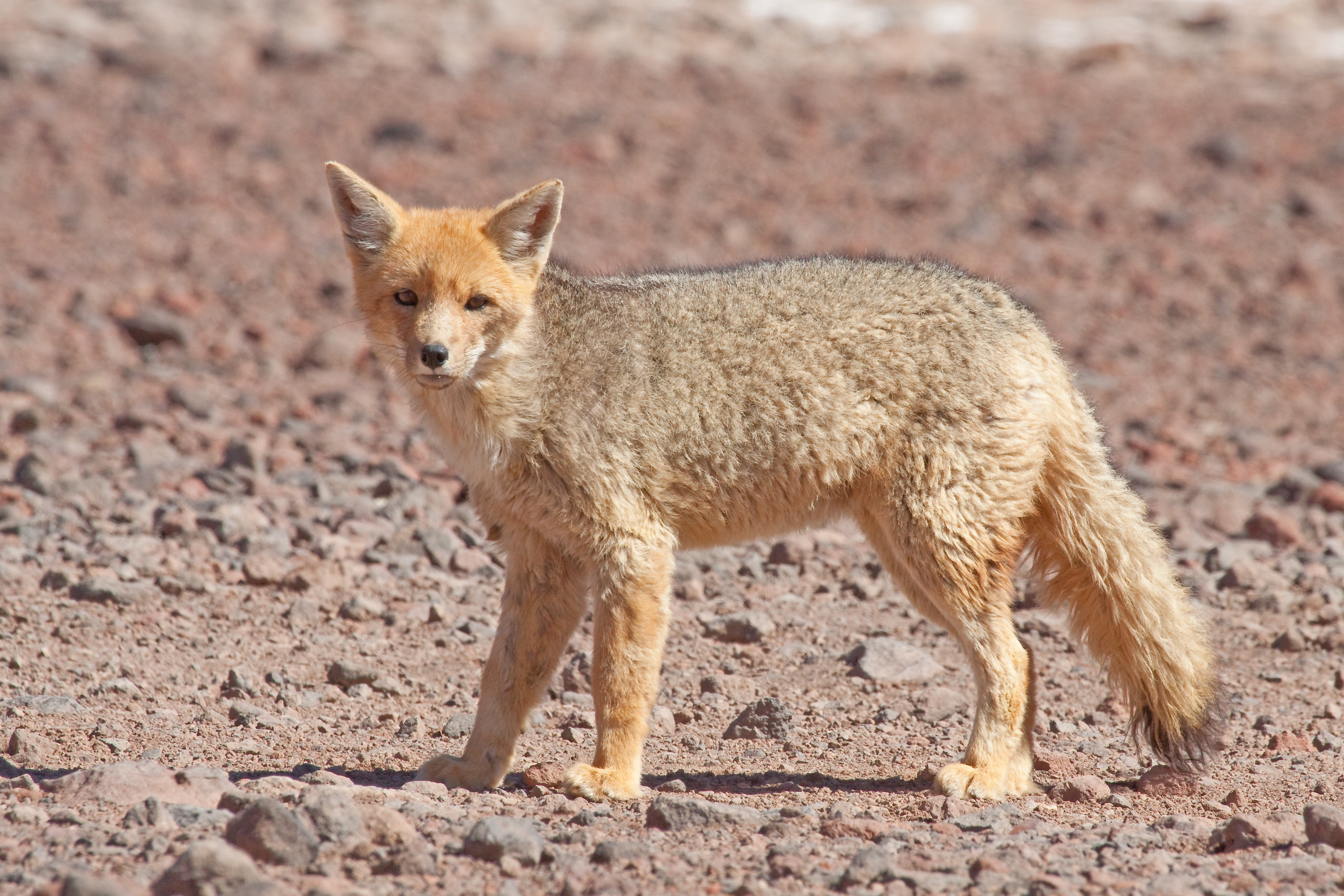
Culpeo (lycalopex culpaeus)

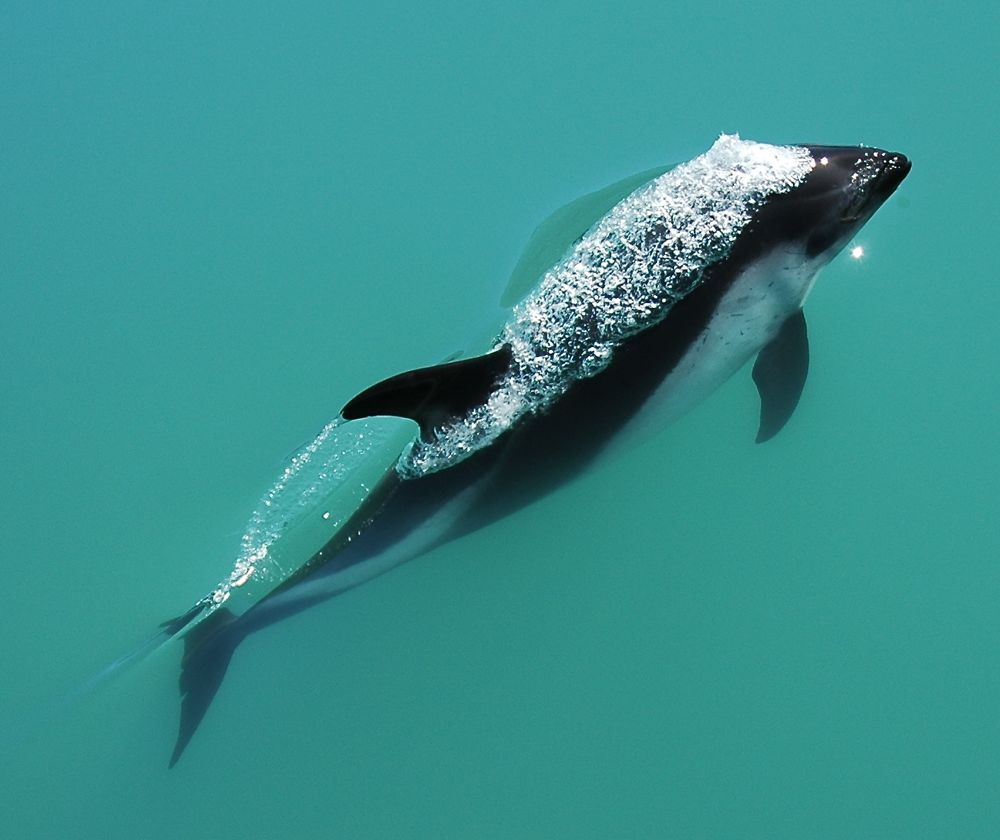
Peale's dolphin (lagenorhynchus australis)

Chilean dolphin (cephalorhynchus eutropia)

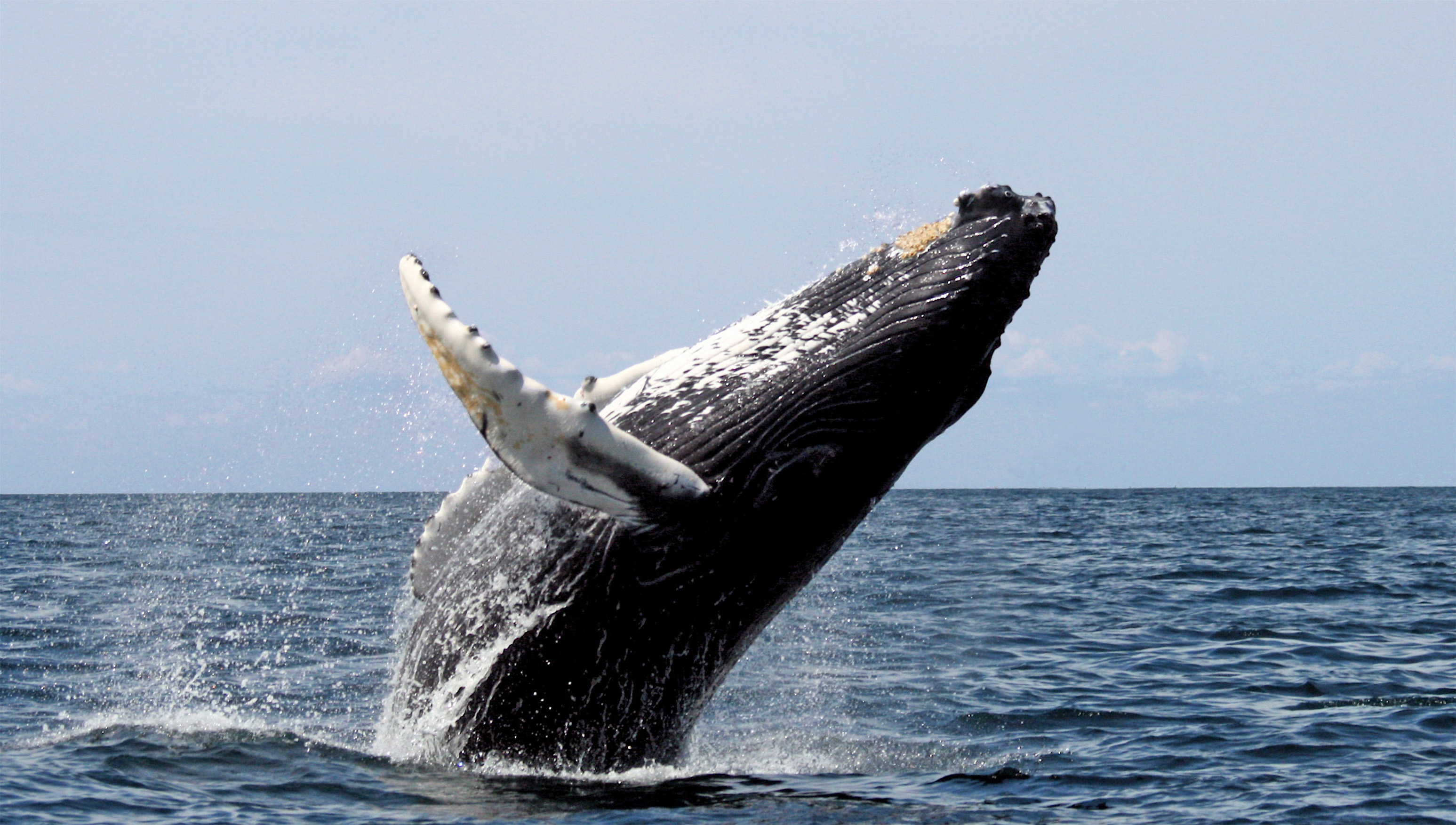
Humpback whale (megaptera novaeangliae)

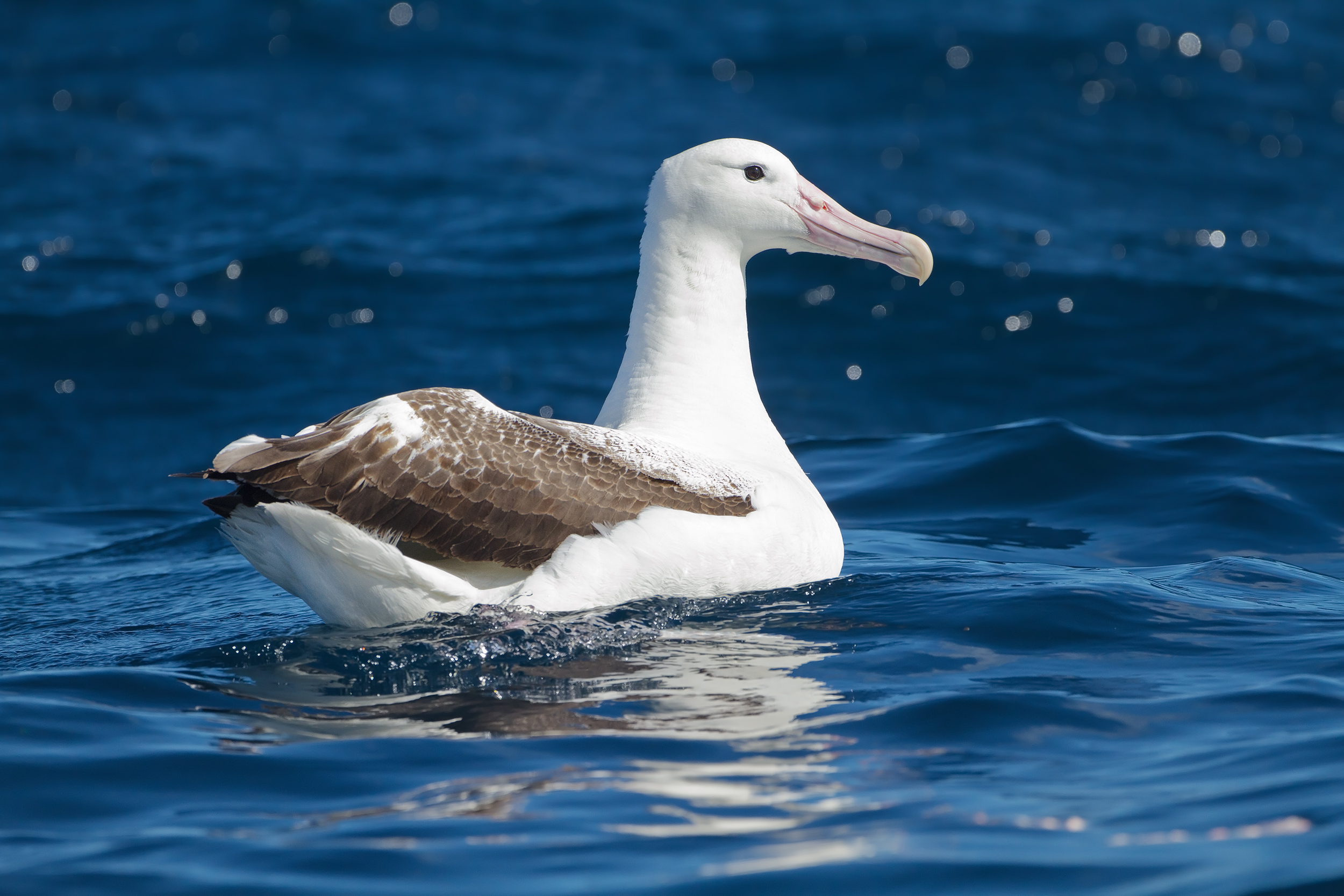
Southern royal albatross (diomedea epomophora).

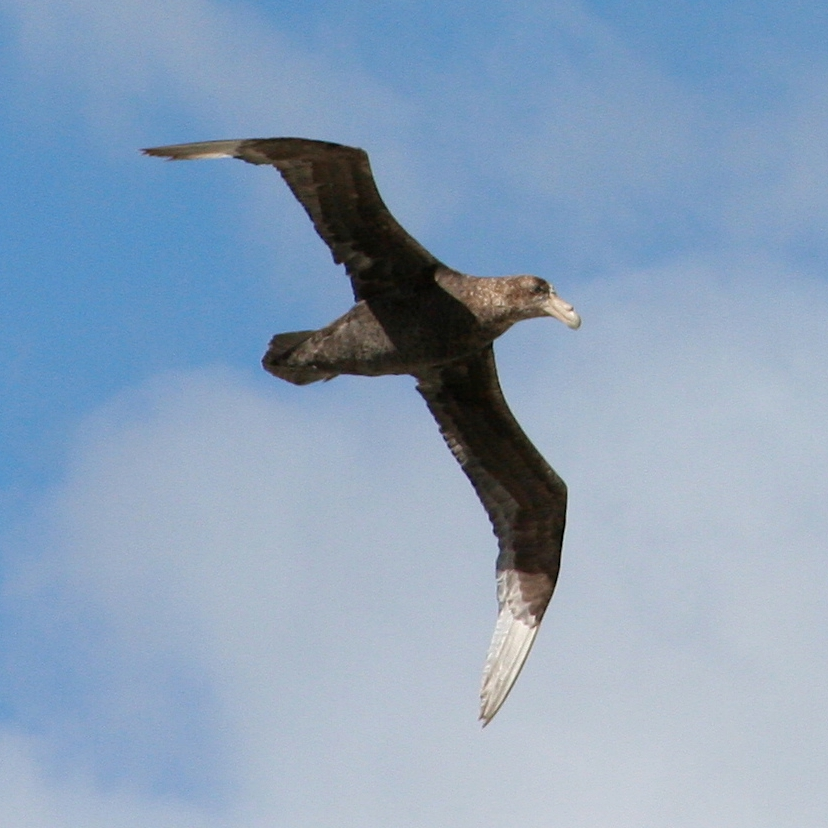
Southern giant petrel (macronectes giganteus), also known as the Antarctic giant petrel, giant fulmar, stinker, and stinkpot.

== Tourism ==
There are no roads to the park, and as such, most visitors arrive by cruise ships or other boats, generally from Punta Arenas, or else by aeroplane from Puerto Williams. There is an admission tariff (foreigners pay twice as much as Chilean nationals); there are few facilities for tourists, but there are park rangers.

== See also ==
- Cabo de Hornos National Park
- Darwin Sound
- Diego Ramirez Islands & Drake Passage National Park
- Cape Horn Biosphere Reserve
