= Thomas Aloysius Dornin =

US Navy officer (1800–1874)

Thomas Aloysius Dornin (b. in Ireland, 1800; d. at Savannah, Georgia, U.S.A., 22 April 1874) was an American naval officer.

He entered the United States Navy, 2 May 1815, as a midshipman, from Maryland. Commissioned a lieutenant in 1825, he commanded the USS Relief, and made a five-years' cruise with the United States Exploring Expedition.

In 1841 he was promoted to the rank of commander and helped to successfully carry out an expedition to prevent the invasion of Mexican territory by the filibuster William Walker. By 1854, he was serving as captain of the USS Portsmouth. In 1855, he engaged in destroying the slave trade as commander of the sloop USS Constellation.

During the American Civil War he attained the rank of commodore on the retired list, 16 July 1862, and at its close was put in charge of the fifth lighthouse district.

== Family ==
His father was Bernard Dornin, the publisher.
