= Cape Froward =

Southernmost point of mainland South America

Coordinates: 53°53′34.6″S 71°18′23.1″W

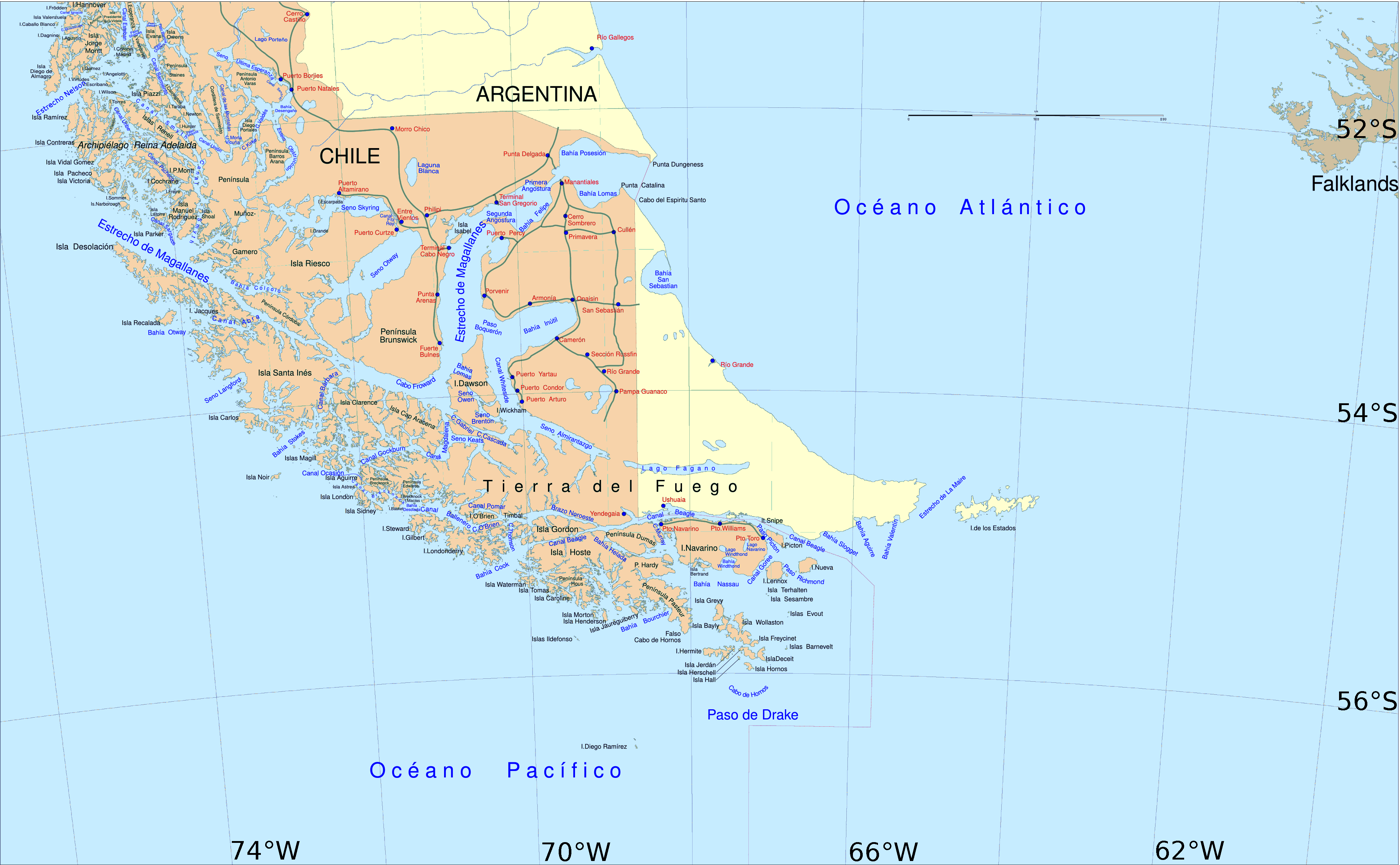
Location of Cape Froward in the Magallanes Region.

Cape Froward (Spanish: Cabo Froward) is the southernmost point of mainland South America. It is located in the Magallanes Region of Chile, along the north shore of Magellan Strait, being the southern tip of the Brunswick Peninsula. In January 1587, the English corsair Thomas Cavendish named the place after the region's rough climate (strong rains and winds).

A large metallic cross (Cruz de los Mares, Cross of the Seas) was built on the cape's hill in honor of Pope John Paul II's visit to Chile in 1987. It is the latest cross located on the site, the first of which was built in 1913 and replaced several times since then due to the harsh weather.

Cape Froward National Park is planned for creation in the area.

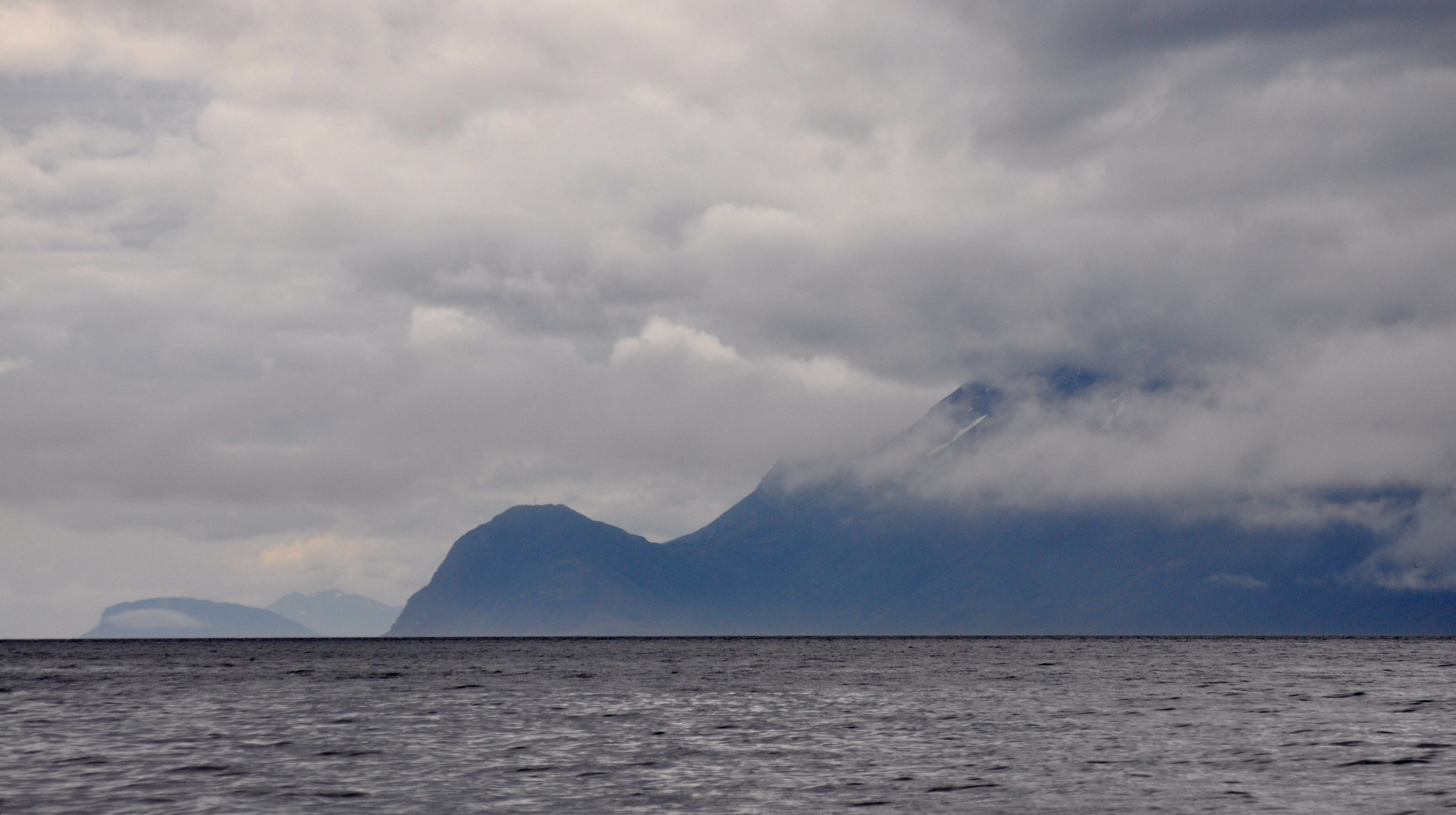
Harsh weather at Cape Froward

== See also ==
- Cape Horn
- False Cape Horn
- Froward Point
- XII Región de Magallanes
