= Alemania Glacier =

Glacier in Chile

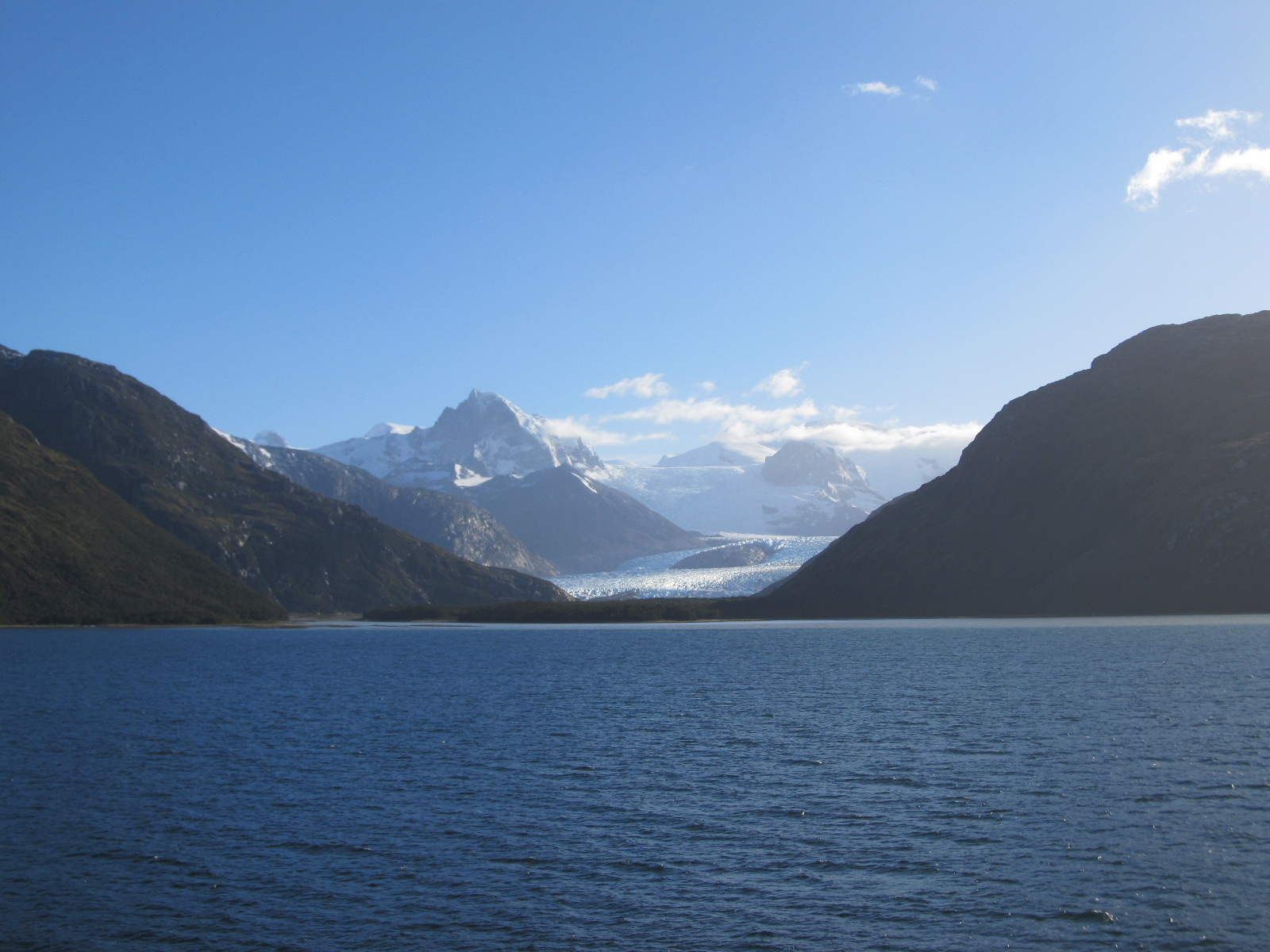
- The glacier as seen from the Beagle Channel.
- Interactive map of Alemania Glacier
- Location: Chile
- Coordinates: 54°52′S 69°23′W

Alemania Glacier, also known as Roncagli Glacier, is a glacier located in Alberto de Agostini National Park, Chile. The advance of one of its lobes blocked the drainage of some streams, forming Martinic Lake.
