= Hardy Peninsula =

Peninsula in southern Chile

Peninsula Hardy
- Location within Chile

Geography
- Coordinates: 55°30′S 68°12′W

Administration
- Chile

Hardy Peninsula of the Hoste

Peninsula Hardy (sometimes called "Pen Hardy") is a peninsula at one of the most southerly extremes of South America. It is the southern landform which extends into the Drake Passage to make the Bahia Nassau. It is part of a large island called Hoste, next to Isla Navarino and Isla Grande de Tierra del Fuego. It is located in the Commune of Cabo de Hornos, belonging to the Antártica Chilena Province of the Magallanes y Antártica Chilena Region, Chile. False Cape Horn is located at the southern tip of this peninsula.

Peninsula Hardy forms the transition zone of the Hardy Formation, a late Jurassic-Early Cretaceous volcanic arc.

== Species ==
- 1840, Lophotus nodipennis, a species of Curculionidae (weevils), was collected by Charles Darwin and described by G.R. Waterhouse.
- 1985, Pratylenchus australis and Eutylenchus fueguensis, two species of Nematoda Tylenchina, were first discovered here.
