= Romanche Glacier =

Glacier in Chile

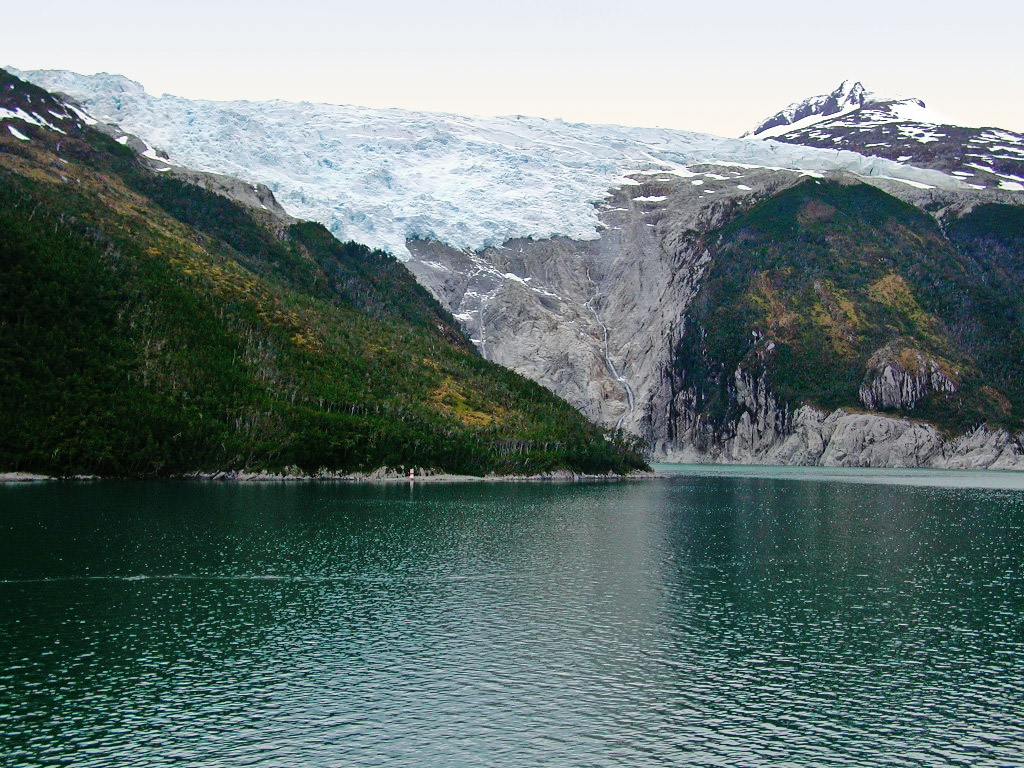
- Interactive map of Romanche Glacier
- Location: Chile
- Coordinates: 54°52′S 69°28′W

Romanche Glacier is a glacier located within the Cordillera Darwin in the Alberto de Agostini National Park, Chile. A cascade from the glacier tumbles into the Beagle Channel. The glacier was named for the French frigate La Romanche carrying a scientific expedition in 1882–1883.
