= False Cape Horn =

Headland in Chile

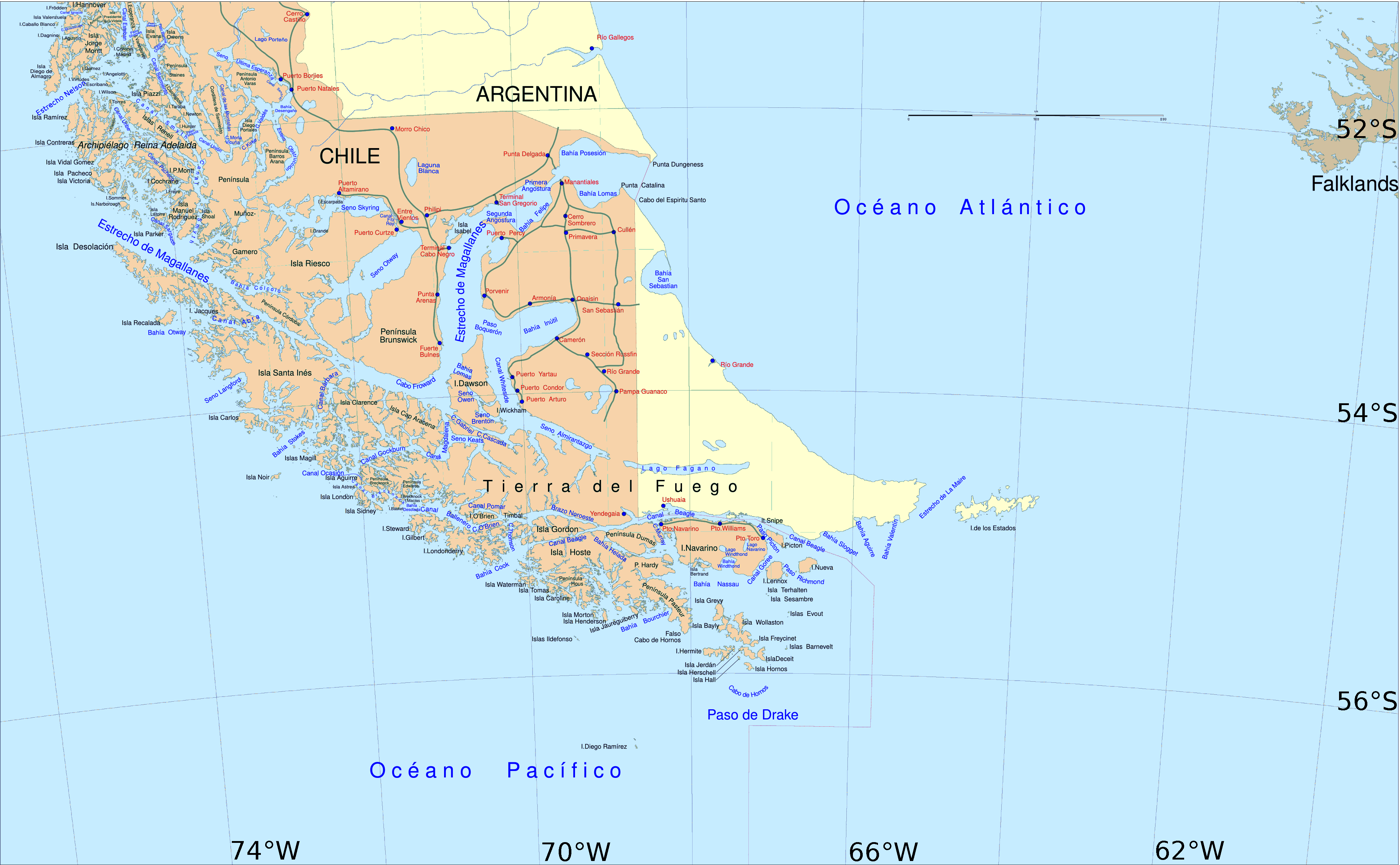
The islands around Cape Horn, showing False Cape Horn.

False Cape Horn or Falso Cabo de Hornos is a headland at the south end of Hoste Island, 35 statute miles (56 km) northwest of Cape Horn, located at 55°43′37″S 68°03′16″W. False Cape Horn is the southernmost point of the large islands of the Tierra del Fuego group, located close to the mainland of South America.

At least 100 ships were lost in the Cape Horn area between 1850 and 1900. There were three sailing routes through or around the Tierra del Fuego region: Drake Passage (the one going around Cape Horn), Magellan Strait, and Beagle Channel. All three were perilous, but only Drake Passage offered unlimited maneuvering room. It became the preferred route. Since the winds in the area are prevailing westerlies, False Cape Horn is a lee shore which from the west superficially resembles the real Cape Horn to the south. If the officers and crew of a ship saw land off the starboard bow (to the south), there was virtually no chance of stopping or turning, or even slowing, a ship in time to avoid wrecking on the Wollaston Islands. This mistake caused several shipwrecks.

Administratively, False Cape Horn, which belongs to the Commune of Cabo de Hornos, is part of the Antártica Chilena Province of the Magallanes y Antártica Chilena Region, Chile.

The islands around Cape Horn between South America and Antarctica

== See also ==
- Cape Froward
