= Bernard Dornin =

Bernard Dornin (1761, Ireland – 1836, Ohio, U.S.A.) was the first publisher in the United States of distinctively Catholic books.

He left Ireland in 1803 because of the political situation. Arriving in New York, he began a book-selling and publishing concern.

He got out a New Testament printed for him in Brooklyn in 1805, and an edition of Pastorini's History of the Church in 1807. He moved to Baltimore in 1809 and from there to Philadelphia in 1817.

For many years, he was the leading American Catholic publisher, with the support of Archbishop Carroll and other members of the hierarchy. In the early 1830s, he sold his business in Philadelphia and retired to Ohio.
