= Hoste Island =

Island in southern Chile

Native name: Isla Hoste
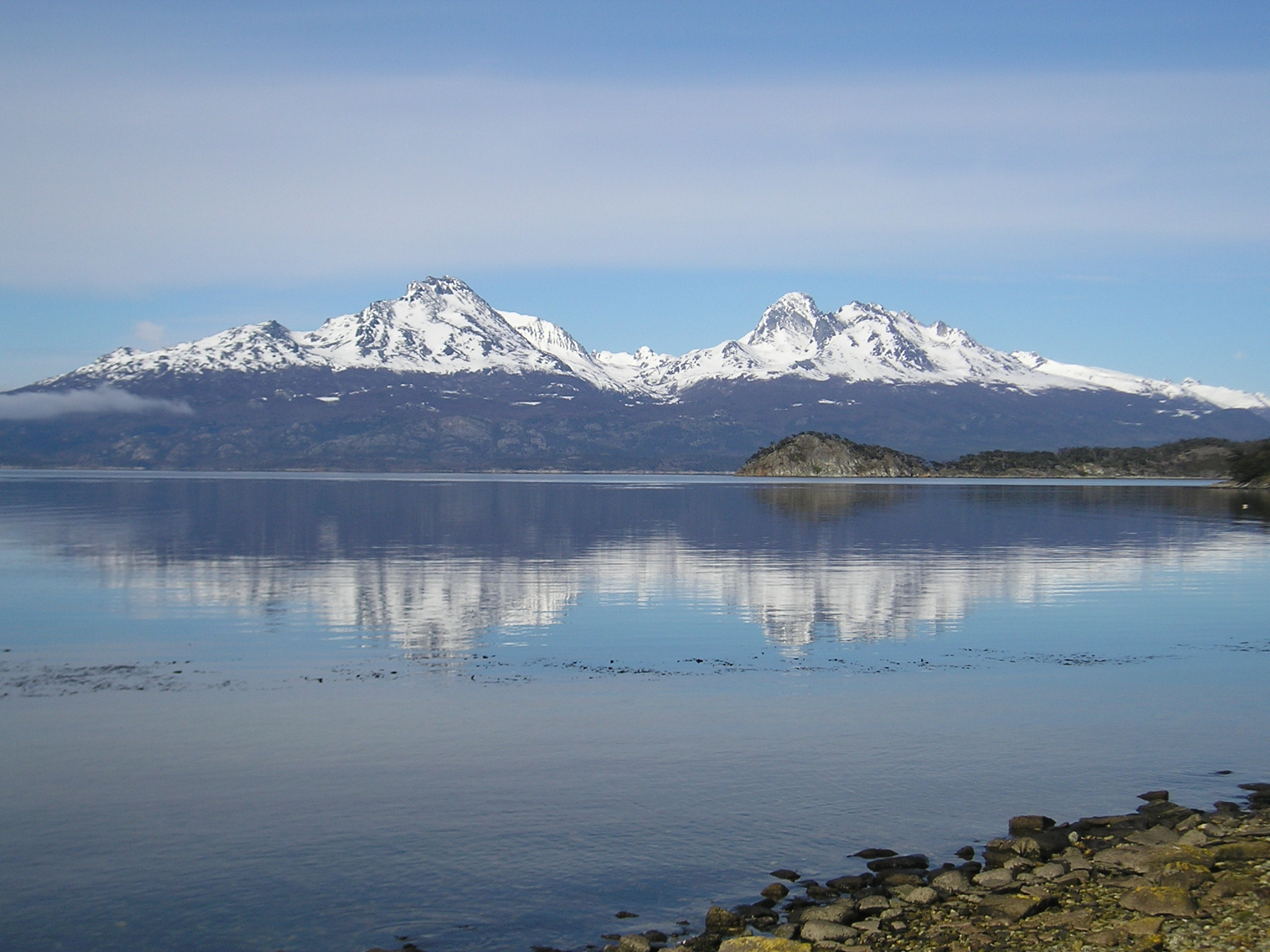
- A view across the Beagle Channel to Isla Hoste from Isla Grande de Tierra del Fuego, with the highpoint of the Pensinusla Dumas seen on the left.

- Location within Southern Patagonia

Geography
- Coordinates: 55°15′S 69°0′W
- Archipelago: Tierra del Fuego
- Area: 4,117 km^{2} (1,590 sq mi)
- Highest elevation: 1,310 m (4300 ft)
- Highest point: Hoste High Point

Administration
- Chile
- Region: Magallanes Region
- Province: Antártica Chilena Province
- Commune: Cabo de Hornos

Demographics
- Population: virtually uninhabited

Additional information
- NGA UFI -884382

Hoste island

Hoste Island (Spanish: Isla Hoste) is one of the southernmost islands in Chile, lying south, across the Beagle Channel, from Isla Grande de Tierra del Fuego and west of Navarino Island, from which it is separated by the Murray Channel. It is named after William Hoste, one of Lord Nelson's protégés.

== Geography ==
With an area of 4,117 square kilometers (1,590 sq mi), Hoste is the second largest island of the Tierra del Fuego archipelago, after Isla Grande de Tierra del Fuego. The western area of the island forms part of the Alberto de Agostini National Park. The most southern point of the island is the False Cape Horn, on the Hardy Peninsula. It has 5 major peninsulas: Hardy, Cloué, Rous, Pasteur and Dumas.

Peninsula Hardy (sometimes called "Pen Hardy") is located at one of the most southerly extremes of South America. It is the southern landform which extends into the Drake Passage to make the Bahía Nassau. False Cape Horn (Spanish: Falso Cabo de Hornos) is located at the southern tip of this peninsula.

Peninsula Cloué comprises the westernmost portion of the island.

Peninsula Rous, in the southwest, contains many fjords and is surrounded by numerous islands of varying sizes.

Peninsula Pasteur extends to the east.

Peninsula Dumas in the northeast is separated from Navarino Island by the Murray Channel and can be seen across the Beagle Channel from the population center Ushuaia on Isla Grande de Tierra de Fuego.

Peninsulas Dumas and Pasteur enclose Pononsby Sound in the east. Southward of Pononsby Sound, Peninsulas Pasteur and Hardy enclose Tekenika Bay. Peninsulas Pasteur, Hardy and Rous, together with the main portion of Hoste Island, enclose Año Nueva Sound to the south.

== History ==
=== French scientific mission to Cape Horn aboard the frigate La Romanche ===
The island was explored by the French La Romanche scientific expedition in 1882–1883.

=== Tekenika Bay ===
As of 1894 the Stirling House, a prefab house built on behalf of the South American Mission Society, was reinstalled in Tekenika Bay, on the southeast coast of Hoste Island in order to avoid the abuses and crimes caused by the recent arrival of miners and diseases in Ushuaia. (Eventually the house was declared a National Monument and was moved to the lands of the Martin Gusinde Anthropological Museum in Puerto Williams).

There had already been unsuccessful attempts at cattle farming by the Chilean government, after which the island was abandoned. Well into the 20th century, a few Yaghan families lived on the island. These indigenous peoples vanished after contact with adventurers and fishermen. Since then, the island has remained virtually uninhabited. The 1992 census reported a population of six living in three houses in the Hoste census enumeration district . However, some if not all, of this population could be located on one or more of the smaller islands nearby which also belonged to the same district.

=== Operation Soberania ===
In December 1978, the island served as a station for Chilean warships during Operation Soberania.

== Notable person ==
- Walter Baldwin Spencer (1860–1929), evolutionary biologist, anthropologist and ethnologist, died on Hoste Island

== See also ==
- Isla Navarino
- List of islands of Chile
