= Escondido =

Escondido means hidden in Spanish.

Escondido may also refer to:

== Places ==
- Escondido, California, a city and valley near San Diego, United States
- Escondido Lake, in Argentina
  - Lago Escondido, a settlement near the lake
- Escondido Valley AVA, a wine area in Texas, United States

=== Rivers ===
- Escondido River (Coahuila), tributary of the Rio Grande in Mexico
- Escondido River (Nicaragua)
- Nueces River in Texas, originally named Río Escondido

== Other uses ==
- Escondido, a Latin dance from Argentina
- Escondido (band), an American indie folk band
- A Minute to Pray, a Second to Die (film)

== See also ==
- El Escondido, a volcano in Colombia
- Puerto Escondido (disambiguation)
- Río Escondido (disambiguation)
