= Hidden River =

Hidden River may refer to:

- Hidden River (Colorado), a headwater of the South Platte River
- Hidden River, an underground stream in Hidden River Cave, Kentucky

== See also ==
- Río Escondido or Escondido River, (Spanish, 'Hidden River')
- Schuylkill or Schuylkill River, (Dutch, 'Hidden River')
- Cache River, (French, 'Hidden River')
