= Lago Fagnano =

Lake in Argentina and Chile

Cami Lake Fagnano Lake
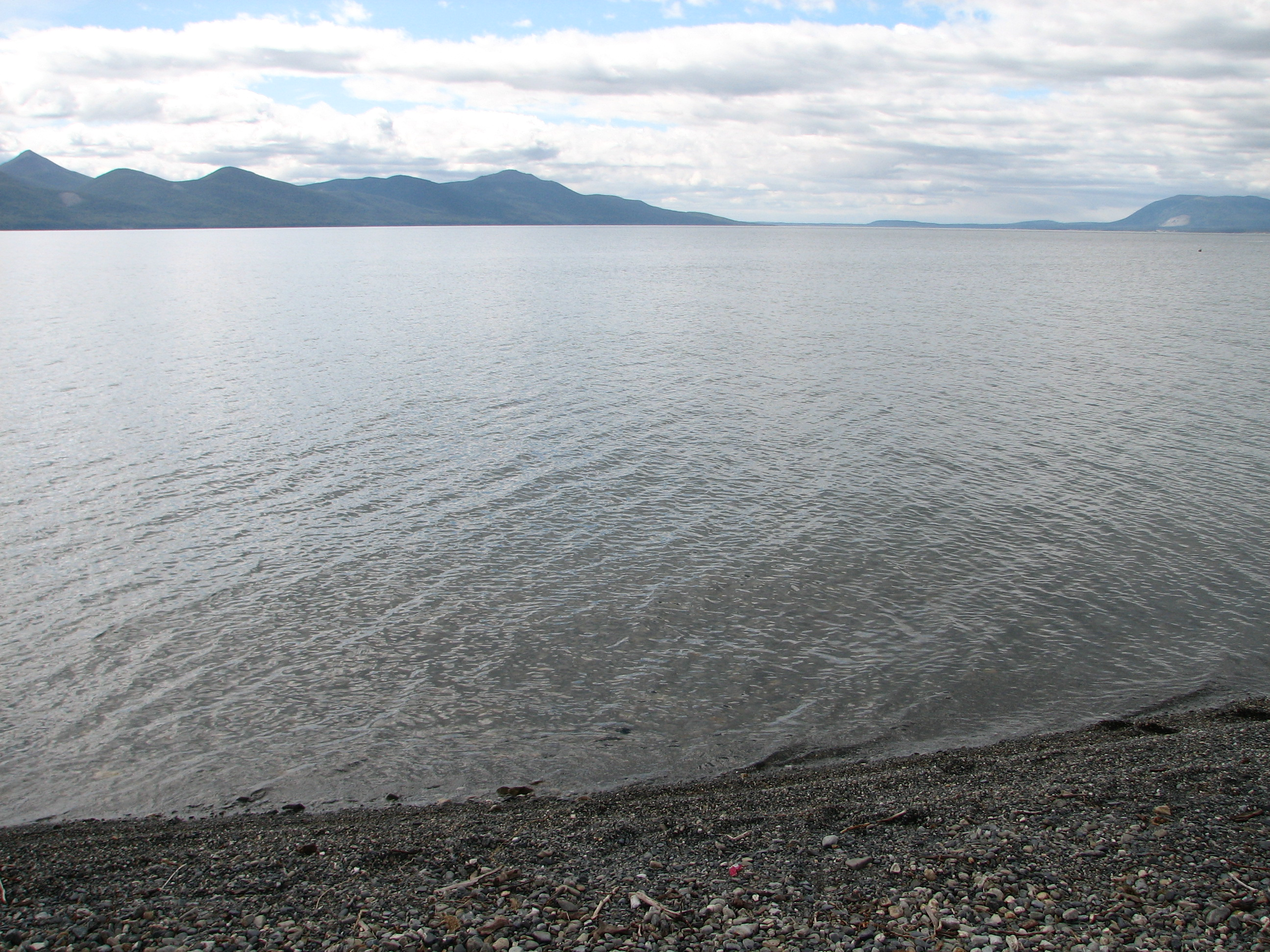

- Location within Argentina
- Location: Ushuaia Department / Tolhuin Department, Tierra del Fuego Province, Argentina / Tierra del Fuego Province, Magallanes and Antártica Chilena Region, Chile
- Coordinates: 54°32′36″S 67°59′00″W
- Primary outflows: Azopardo River
- Catchment area: 3,481 km (2,163 mi)
- Basin countries: Argentina, Chile
- Max. length: 98 km (61 mi)
- Surface area: 645 km^{2} (249 sq mi)
- Average depth: 193.8 m (636 ft)
- Max. depth: 449 m (1,473 ft)
- Water volume: 125 km^{3} (30 cu mi)
- Shore length^{1}: 269 km (167 mi)
- Surface elevation: 140 m (460 ft)
- Settlements: Tolhuin
- ^{1} Shore length is not a well-defined measure.

Fagnano Lake (Spanish: Lago Fagnano), also called Lake Cami (Spanish: Lago Cami), is a lake located on the main island of the Tierra del Fuego archipelago, and shared by Argentina and Chile. The 645 km^{2} lake runs east–west for about 98 kilometres, of which 72.5 km (606 km^{2}) belong to the Argentine Tierra del Fuego Province, and only 13.5 km (39 km^{2}) to the Chilean Magallanes y la Antártica Chilena Region. It has a maximum depth of 449 meters. The southern bank is steep compared to the northern one, and expands in a considerably wide and flat piedmont from which both levels of the plateaus can be appreciated. From its western end, the Azopardo River drains towards the Almirantazgo Fjord. On its eastern end is the town of Tolhuin. The lake is located in a pull-apart basin developed along the Magallanes–Fagnano Fault zone.

According to a Selkʼnam myth, the lake was created alongside the Strait of Magellan and Beagle Channel in places where slingshots fell on earth during Taiyín's fight with a witch who was said to have "retained the waters and the foods".

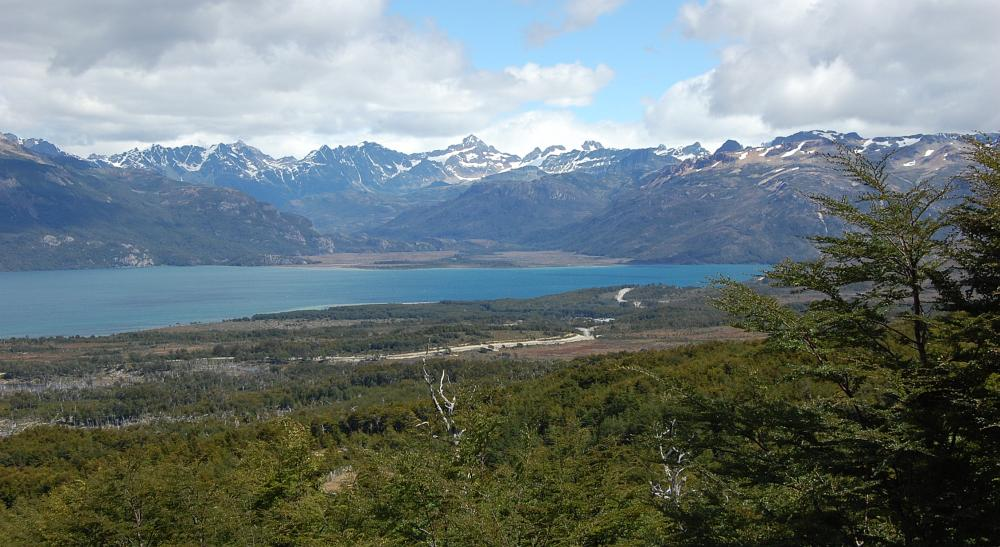
Fagnano Lake, from north to south, in its Chilean part

== Route ==
Initial explorations of Route Y-85, over a 1955 map from the Instituto Geográfico Militar de Chile at a 1:250000 scale. The route starts at CH 257, crosses Y-71, and roughly follows the path taken by the 1978 Vicuña–Yendegaia expedition, shown as the green line.

... (contenido previo conservado)

== Population, economy and ecology ==
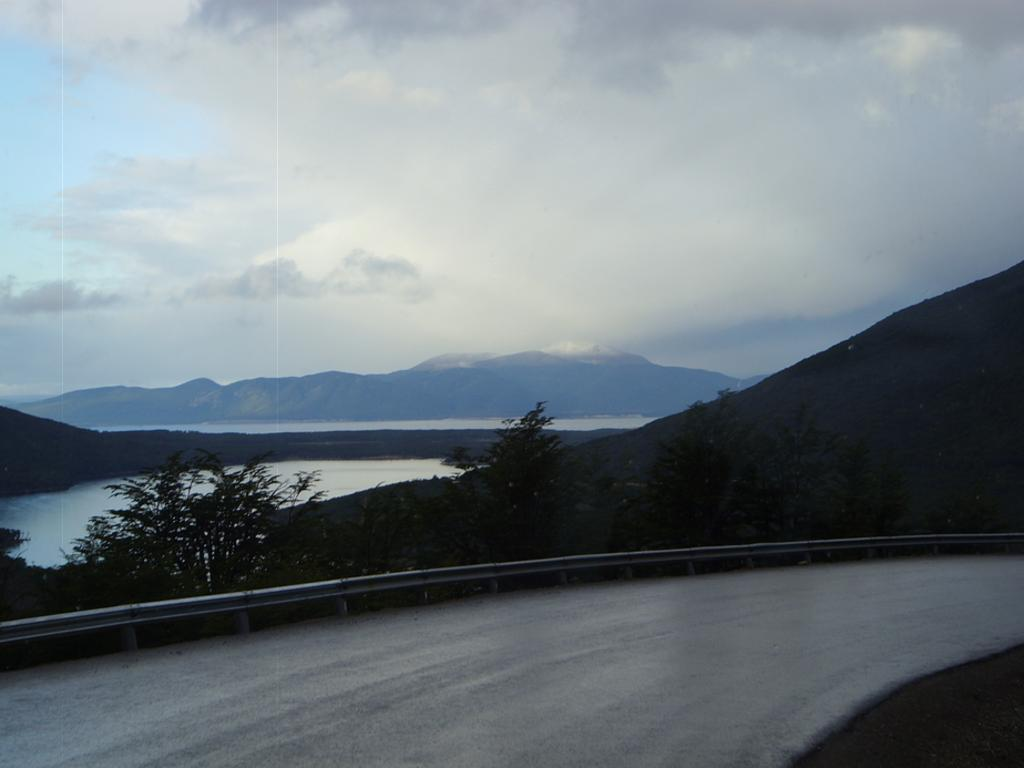
View of the eastern shores of Lake Fagnano (or Kami) from the Argentine side (National Route 3), which in Tierra del Fuego continues from National Route 40 (Argentina).

If starting from the Argentine city of Ushuaia, the lake is reached after a scenic 100 km drive along National Route 3, which is fully paved. The route passes through the canyon of the Olivia River, the Tierra Mayor Valley with its winter resorts, the Garibaldi Pass, Escondido Lake, and a sawmill area. On the eastern head of the lake lies Hostería Kaikén, just a few kilometers from the town of Tolhuin, and the Khami cabins. Although Route 3 moves away from the lake near its head, it is possible to follow a gravel road that branches left near the inn and runs along a gravel bar at the lake's head. A Bailey bridge allows for the crossing of the Turbio River. This route provides access to Tolhuin from the west.

From the Argentine city of Río Grande, the lake is also accessible via RN 3 (105 km), passing through transitional landscapes between steppe and the Andes.

From Chile, access is possible via the Route Y-85, which runs parallel to the Rasmussen River, crosses through the Karukinka Natural Park, passes near Deseado Lake, and crosses the mountains to reach the Azopardo River.
