= Tierra del Fuego National Park =

Argentine park

- Parque Nacional Tierra del Fuego
- IUCN category II (national park)
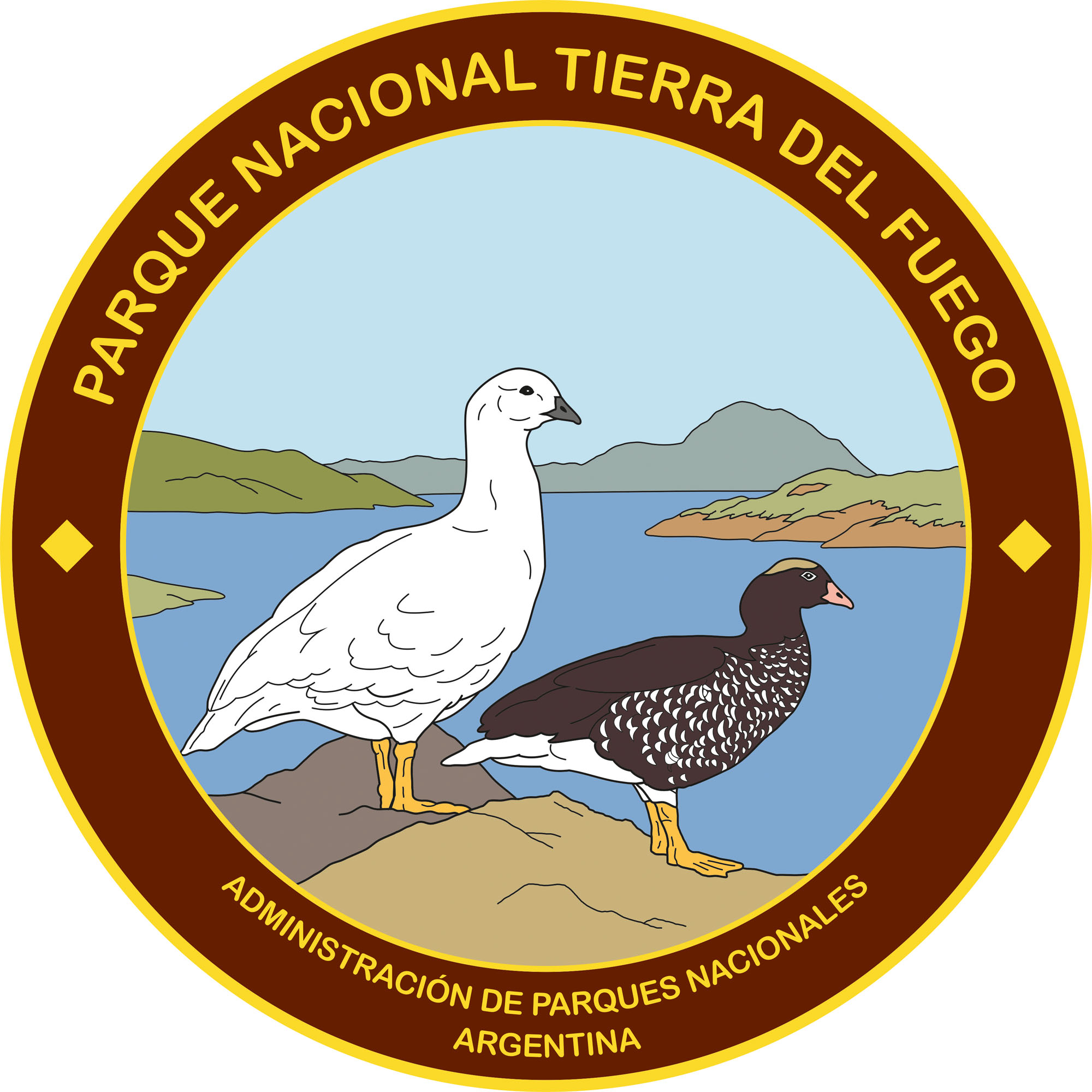

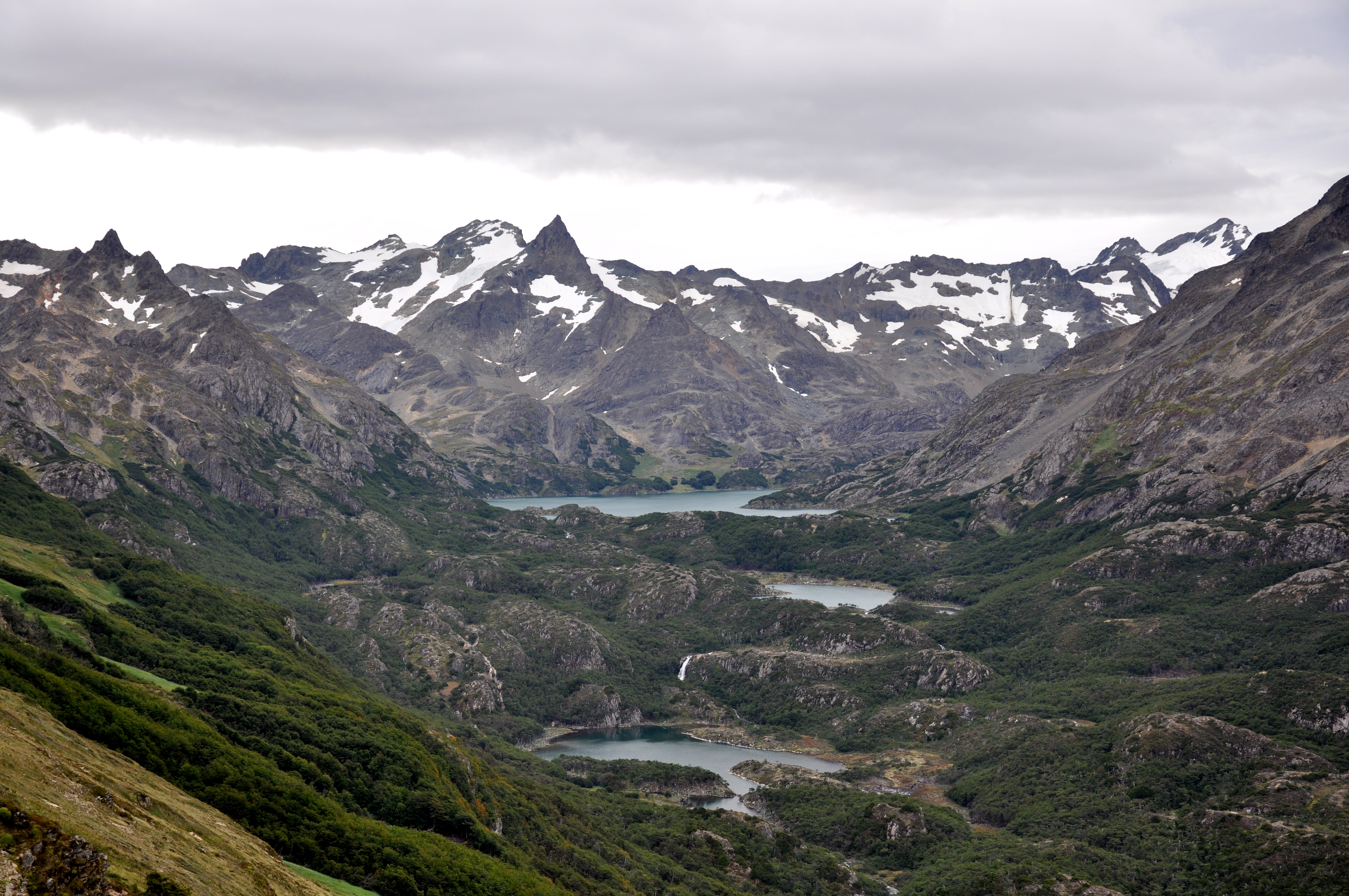

- Location within Argentina
- Location: Tierra del Fuego Province, Argentina
- Nearest city: Ushuaia
- Coordinates: 54°50′S 68°30′W
- Area: 630 km^{2} (243 sq mi)
- Established: 15 October 1960
- Governing body: Administración de Parques Nacionales

Tierra del Fuego National Park (Spanish: Parque Nacional Tierra del Fuego) is a national park on the Argentine part of the island of Tierra del Fuego, within Tierra del Fuego Province in the ecoregion of Patagonic Forest and Altos Andes, a part of the subantarctic forest. Established on 15 October 1960 under the Law 15.554 and expanded in 1966, it was the first shoreline national park to be established in Argentina.

The park has dramatic scenery, with waterfalls, forests, mountains, and glaciers. Its 630 km^{2} (240 sq mi) include parts of the Fagnano and Roca lakes. The Senda Costera (Coastal Path), connecting Ensenada Bay to Lapataia Bay on Lago Roca, is a popular hiking trail within the park. Forests of Antarctic beech, lenga beech, and coihue in the lower elevations of the park are home to many animal species. There are 20 species of terrestrial mammals, including the guanaco, Andean fox, North American beaver, European rabbit and muskrat. Among the 90 species of birds are the kelp goose, torrent duck, austral parakeet, Andean condor, blackish oystercatcher, and Magellanic oystercatcher.

The southernmost national park in Argentina, it is listed as an IUCN category II park. The park stretches 60 km (37 mi) north from the Beagle Channel along the Chilean border. Ushuaia, the capital of Tierra del Fuego Province, is 11 km (6.8 mi) from the park. The park can be reached by car or by train. The southern terminus of the Pan-American Highway is located within the park, as is the El Parque station of the End of the World Train.

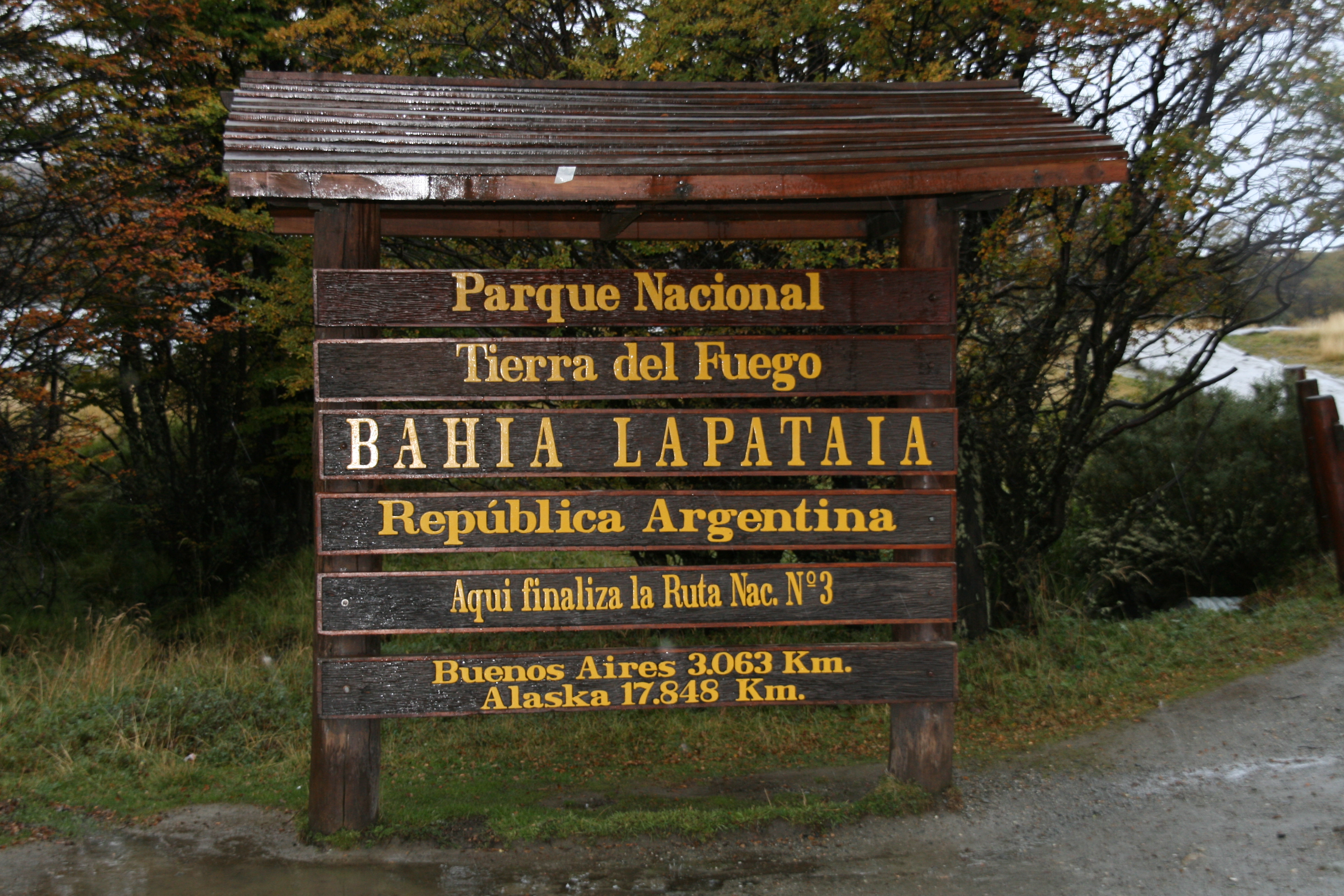
Tierra del Fuego National Park, Argentina

== Geography ==
The park forms the southern portion of the subantarctic forest and is known for its biological richness.

=== Flora ===
The subantarctic forest vegetation is dominated by tree species of coihue, nires, and lenga (a tree or shrub native to the Andes and also known as lenga beech) apart from a profusion of massbed. The flora that characterizes the "Andino-Patagonico" forests, the lenga, is well distributed over the mountain slopes above sea level to a height of 600 m (2,000 ft). Above 600 m (2,000 ft) elevation, the flora consists of altoandina with small little bushes, plants en cojin and grasses.

IUCN has reported forests of southern beech species of Nothofagus pumilio, N. antarctica and N. betuloides. Other species include Berberis buxifolia, Embothrium coccineum, winter's bark Drimys winteri, and Crowberry, Empetrum rubrum and mosses. Magellan coihue (coihue de Magallanes) is found in the wettest parts of the Beagle channel coast of the park. Lenga is found in the Pipo River Valley and some parts of southern mountain slopes and may be thickly set and reach great heights. Chinese lantern, hemiparasite and Pande Indian or Llao Llao, which are fungus parasites, are found over the branches of the trees. Cinnamon is also reported in many small forest areas of the park. Peat bogs are extensively found in the park. These are made up of sphagnum moss and aquatic grasses in damp valleys where low temperatures and slow-moving acidic waters prevent decomposition.

The flower varieties found are calafate, chaura and michay, which are orange coloured. Flag tree, strawberry devil and little ferns, yellow orchids and luzuriagas are seen in the understory of forest cover. Black bush, caulking, grill, and Embothrium cocci with red tubular flowers are typically seen in the Beagle Channel coast and the western part of Lapataia Bay. Also found is the chocolate scented Nassauvia.

Flora in Tierra del Fuego

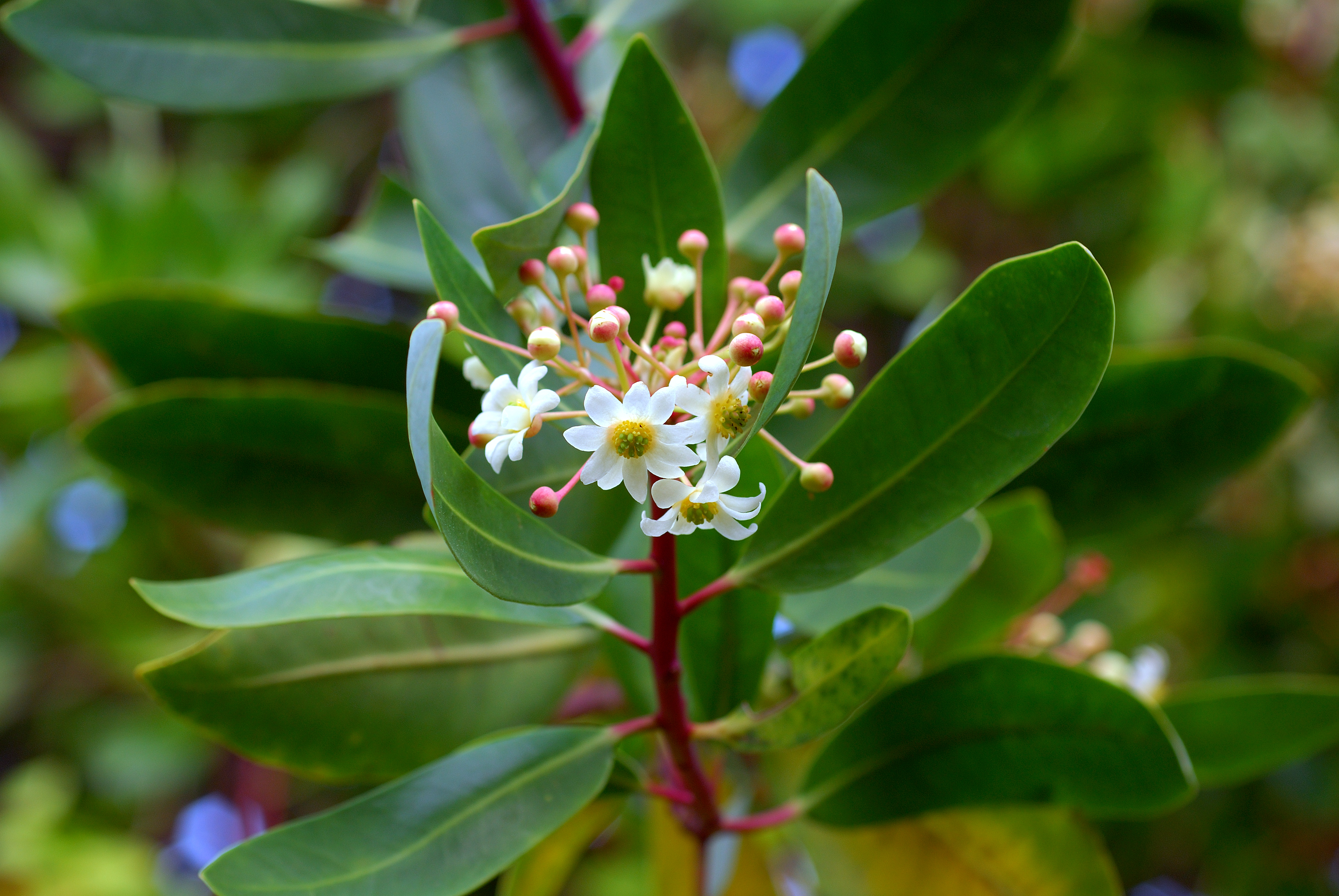
Drimys winteri flowers

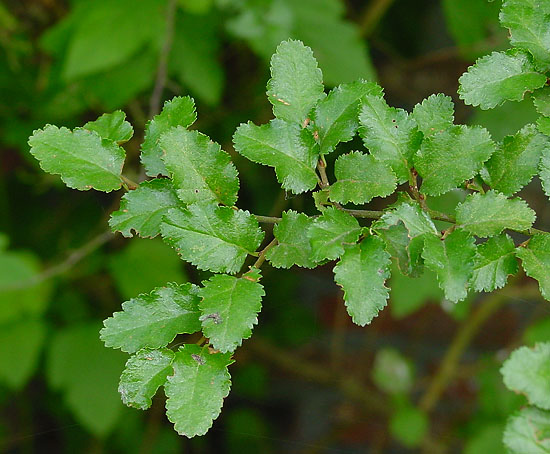
Nothofagus antarctica

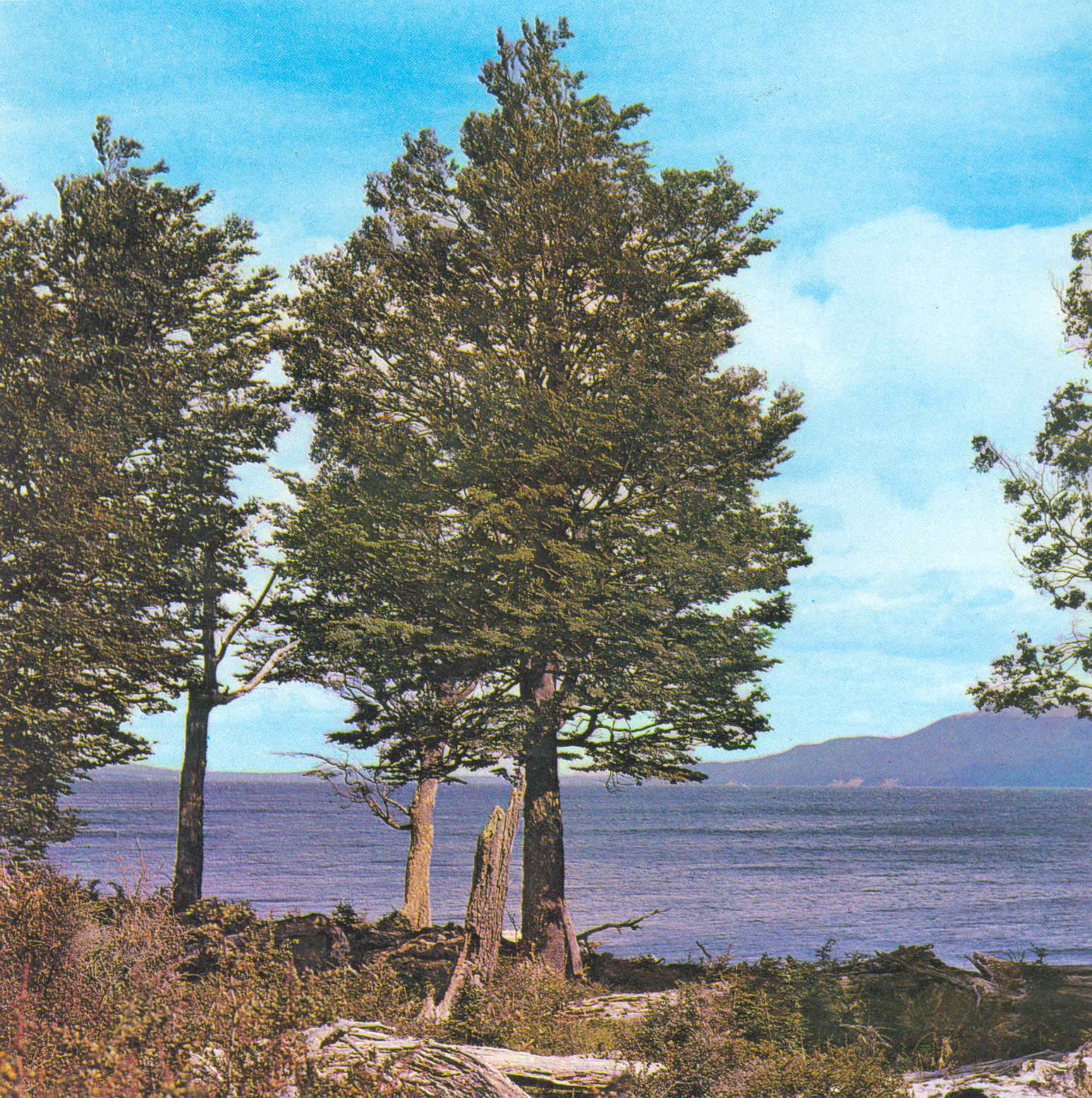
Nothofagus pumilio

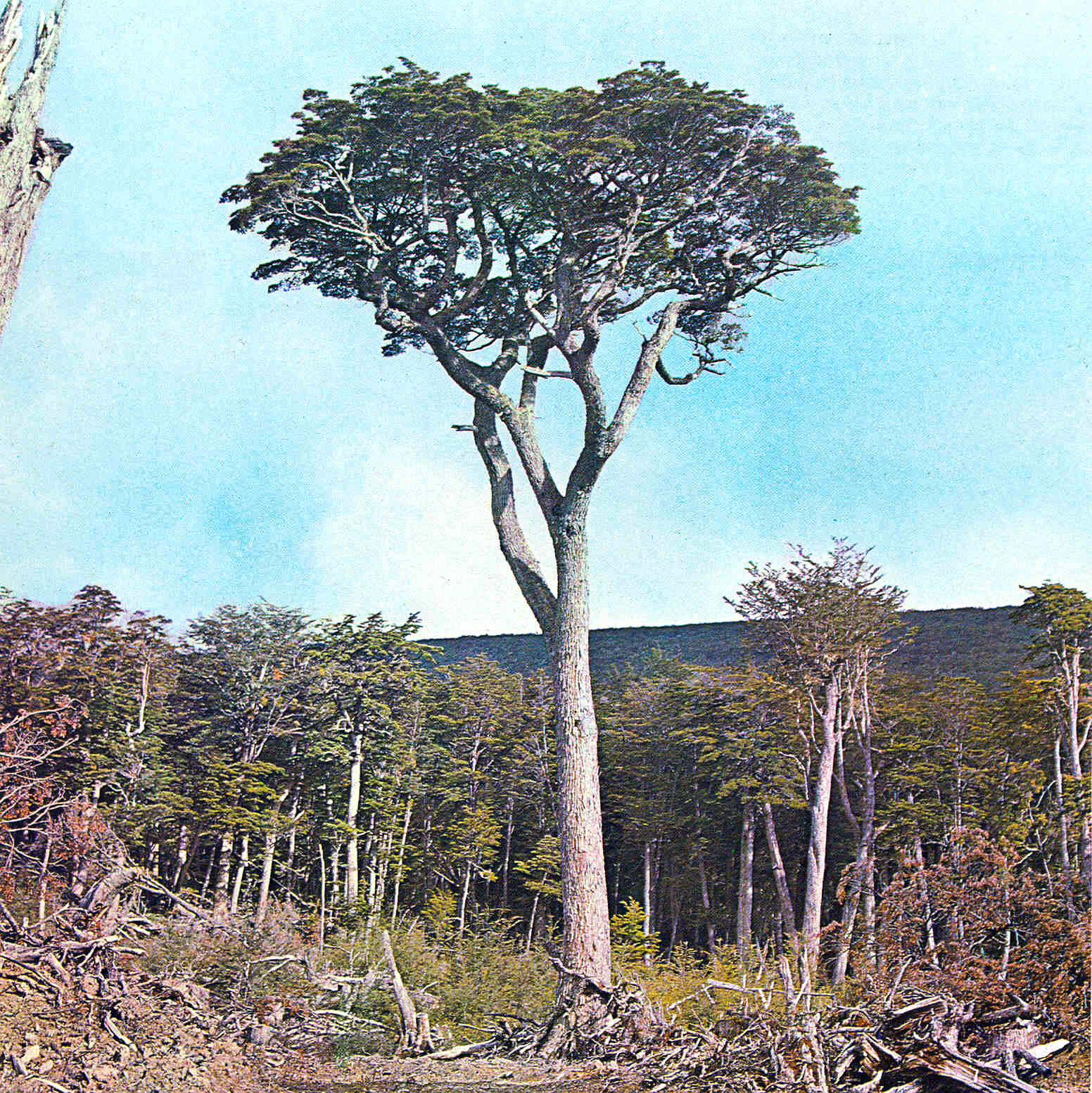
Nothofagus betuloides

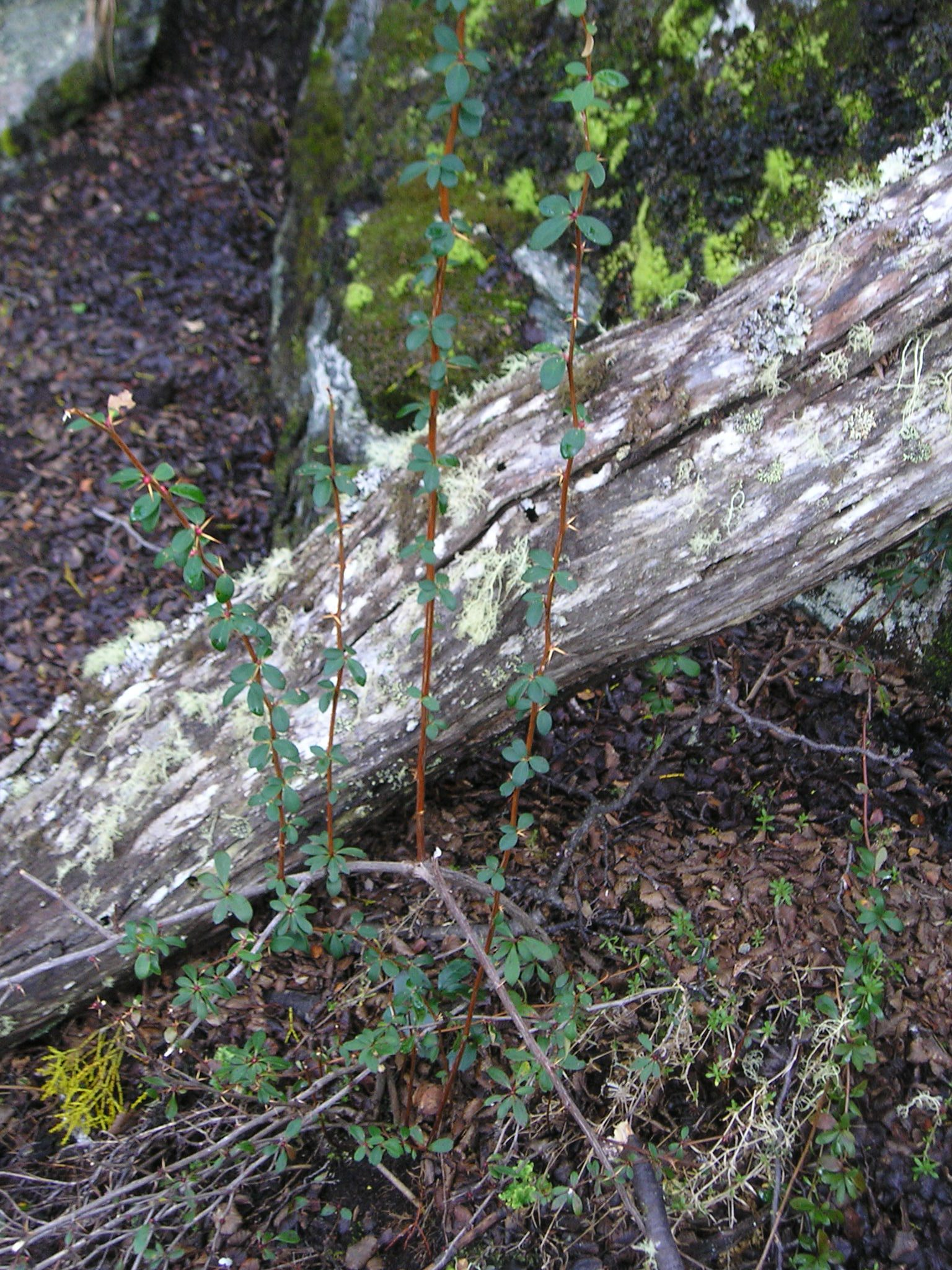
Calafate (Berberis buxifolia) plant west of Ushuaia

=== Fauna ===
Settlers from Europe and North America introduced many species of animals into the area, such as the European rabbit, North American beaver, and muskrat, which rapidly proliferated and caused significant damage to the environment.

Avifauna includes three types of cauquenes (sheldgeese) namely, cauquen comun (upland goose or Magellan goose), cauquen real (ashy-headed goose) and caranca (kelp goose ), found in open places and beaches. Other birds include Patagonian woodpeckers, notably the spectacular Magellanic woodpecker (maca común, common maca), heron, pato creston (crested duck). Andean condors are seen flying on the peaks and valleys of Tierra del Fuego. It is also home to the austral parakeet (Enicognathus ferrugineus), the southernmostly distributed species of parrot.

Aquafauna consists of scallop, moon snail, spiral tooth, few crustaceans like crabs and fishes such as sardines, Falkland sprat, Fueguina, merluza and Robalo de cola, jellyfish concentrations, steamer ducks and cormorants. Guanaco (Lama guanicoe) and South American sea lions are reported in the park.

Sea birds reported include petrels and albatrosses. Other notable fauna reported are several species of penguins, the South Andean deer (Hippocamelus bisulcus), and the southern river otter (Lontra provocax).

Fauna in Tierra del Fuego

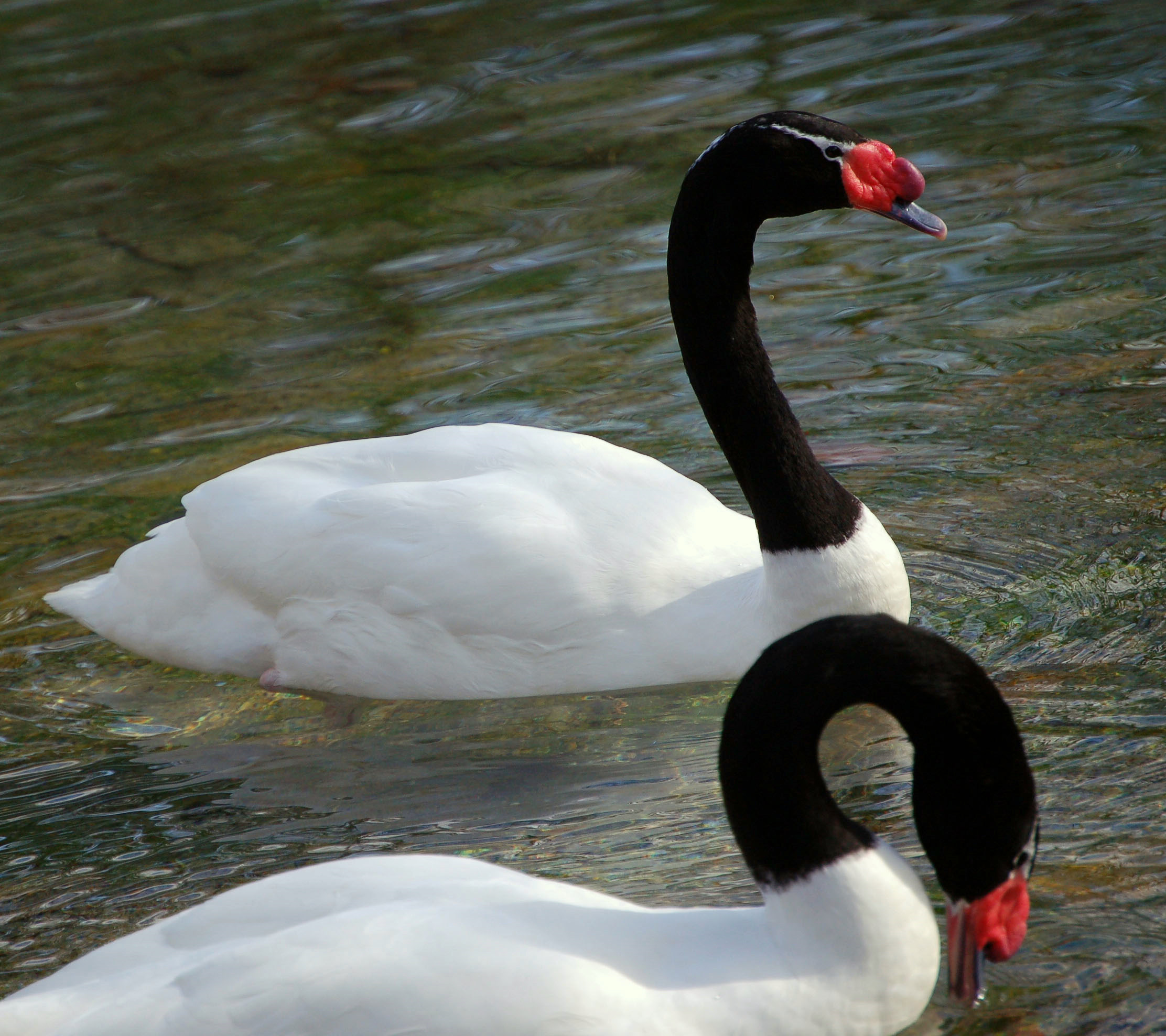
A pair of black-necked swans in the park

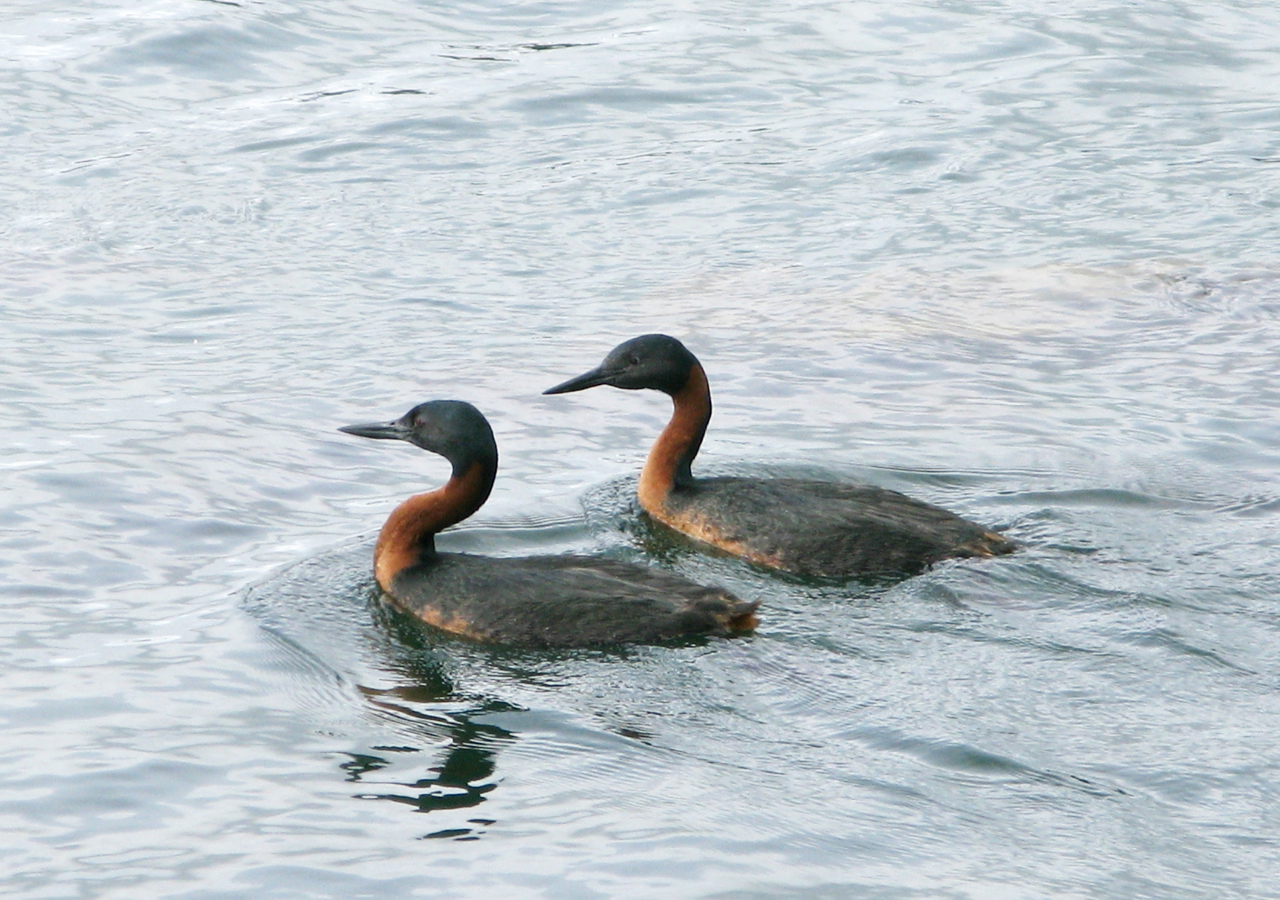
Podiceps major – great grebe- Tierra del Fuego National Park

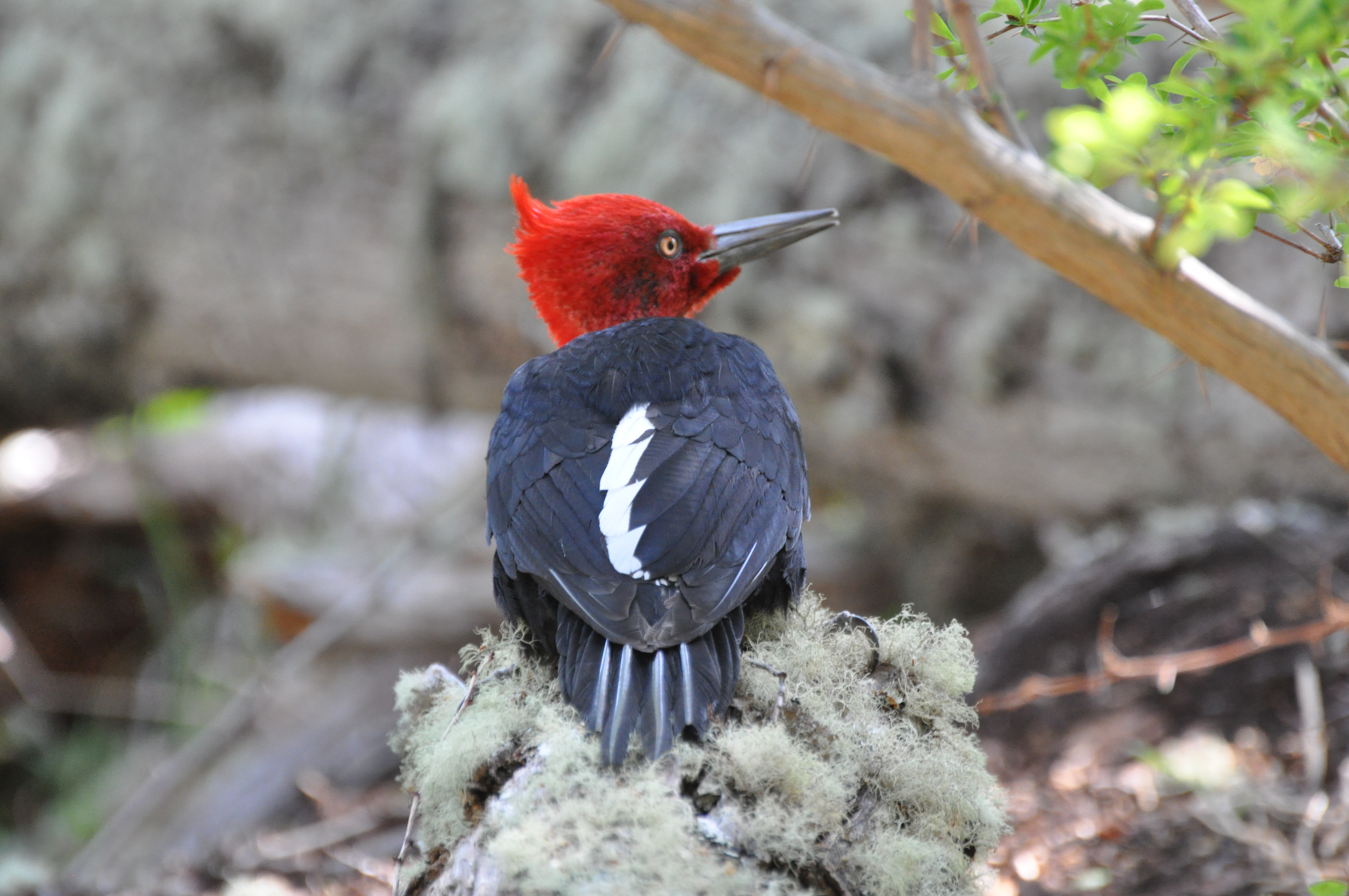
A Magellanic woodpecker (Campephilus magellanicus) near Ushuaia

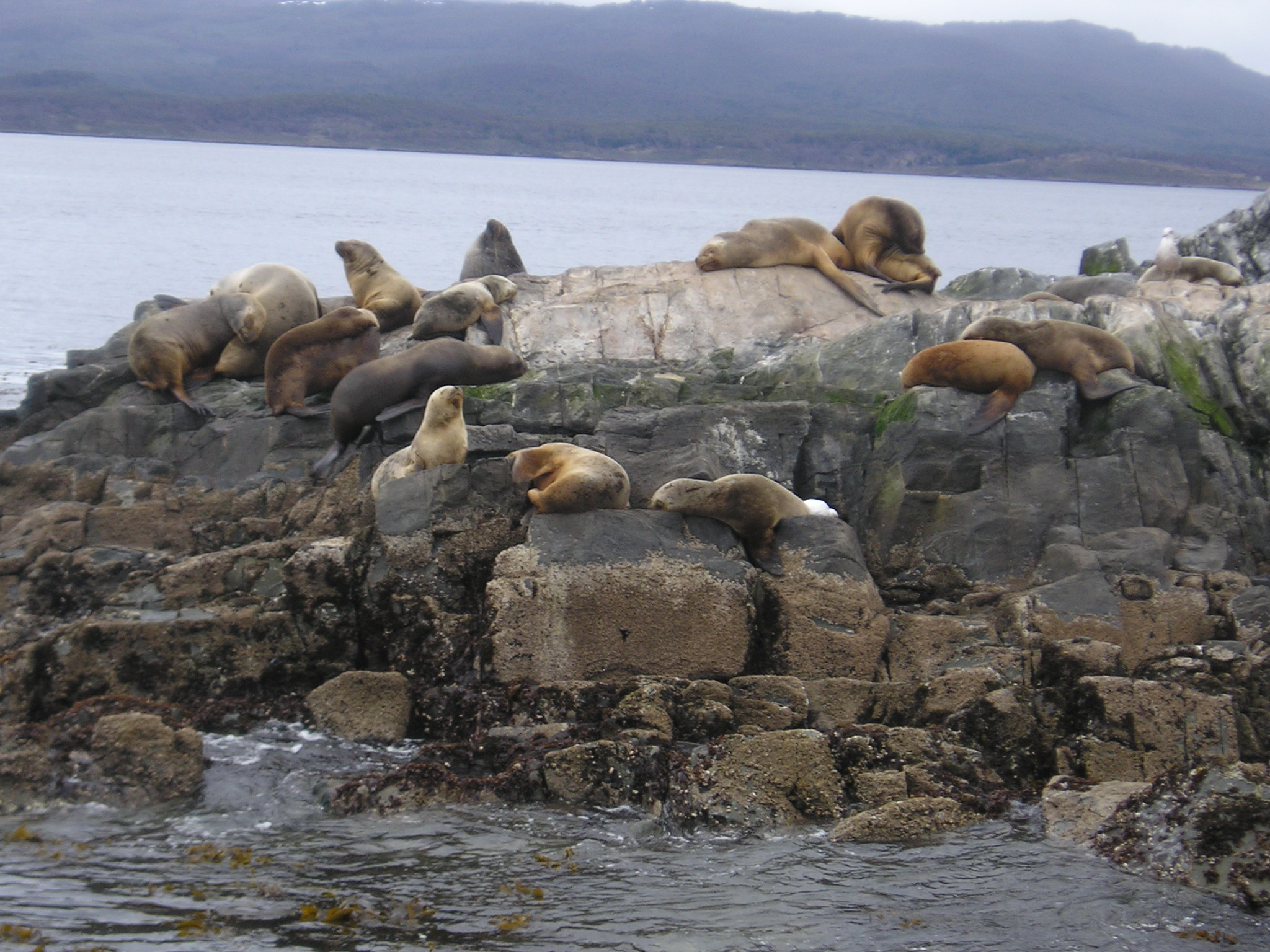
Sea lions at the Beagle Channel near Ushuaia

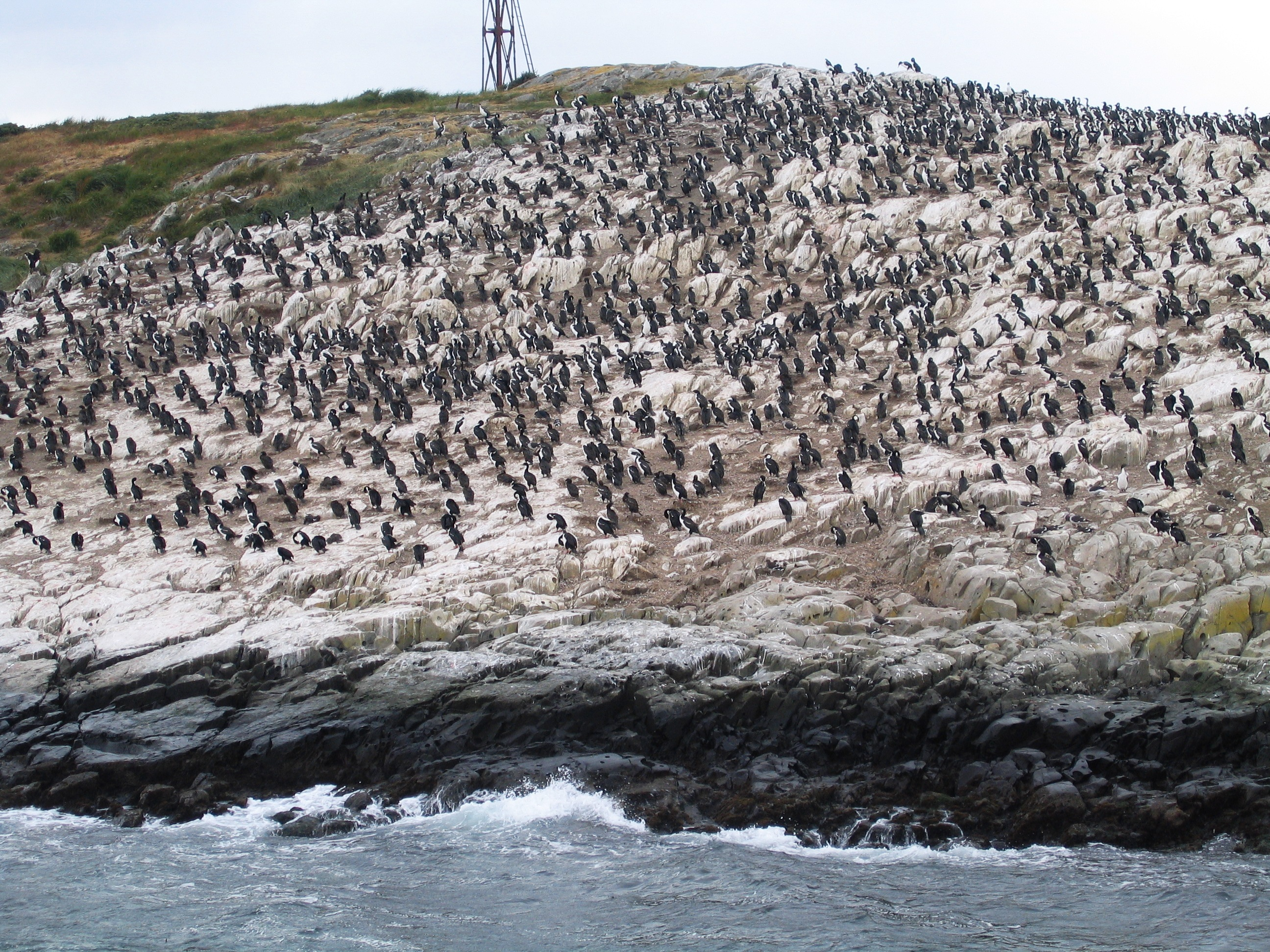
Cormorant colony on the shores of the Beagle Channel

=== Features ===
Tierra del Fuego National Park contains mountains, lakes, rivers, and valleys. It is bounded on the west by the Chilean border, on the north by Lago Fagnano, and on the south by the Beagle Channel, which forms the shoreline. It encompasses an area of 63,000 hectares (160,000 acres) and represents two ecoregions: the Altos Andes and the Patagonian Forest. While the former ecoregion is made up of hill ranges and slopes, the latter has high and jagged mountains, glacier valleys, and semi-deciduous forests. The landscape of the park is the result of glacial erosion, which has created bays and beaches against a backdrop of rugged mountains and valleys.

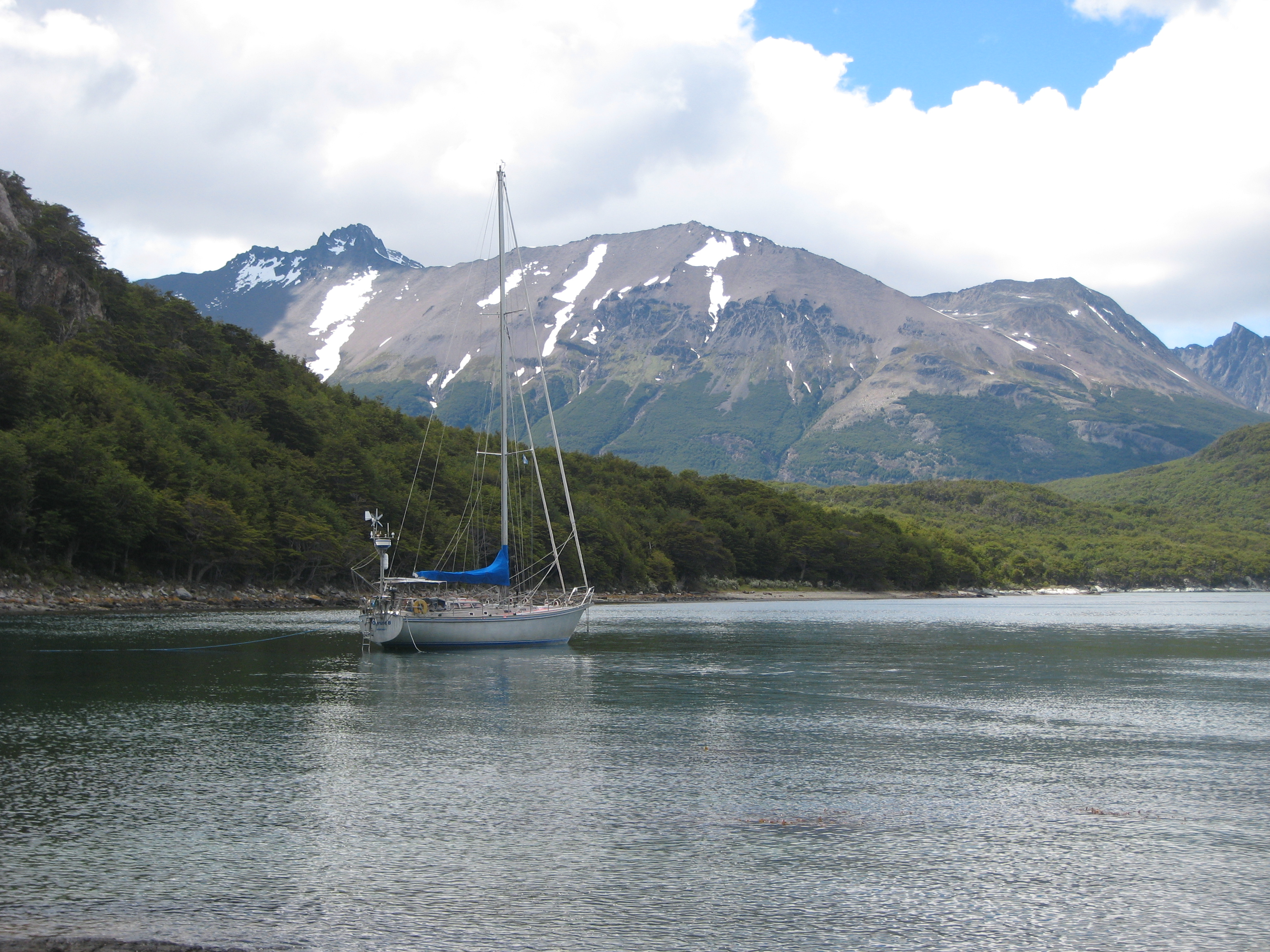
Beagle Channel in Ushuaia

The park is located 11 km (6.8 mi) to the west of the city of Ushuaia, on National Road 3. Ushuaia provides the main approach to the park through the highway or through the Southern Fuegian Railway.

==== Beagle Channel ====
The Beagle Channel or strait in Tierra del Fuego National Park is named after the British ship HMS Beagle, which sailed with the naturalist Charles Darwin aboard in 1833–34. The channel separates islands of the Tierra del Fuego Archipelago, in extreme southern South America. It separates Isla Grande de Tierra del Fuego from the islands of Nueva, Picton, Navarino, Hoste, Londonderry, Stewart, and other smaller islands to the south. It is oriented in an east–west direction, and runs for a length of 150 mi (240 km). Its width varies from 3 to 8 mi (4.8 to 12.9 km). The biggest settlement on the channel is Ushuaia in Argentina followed by Puerto Williams in Chile, two of the southernmost settlements in the world. Ancient middens where Yaghan tribes lived are seen on the beaches around the Beagle Channel.

==== Lago Fagnano ====
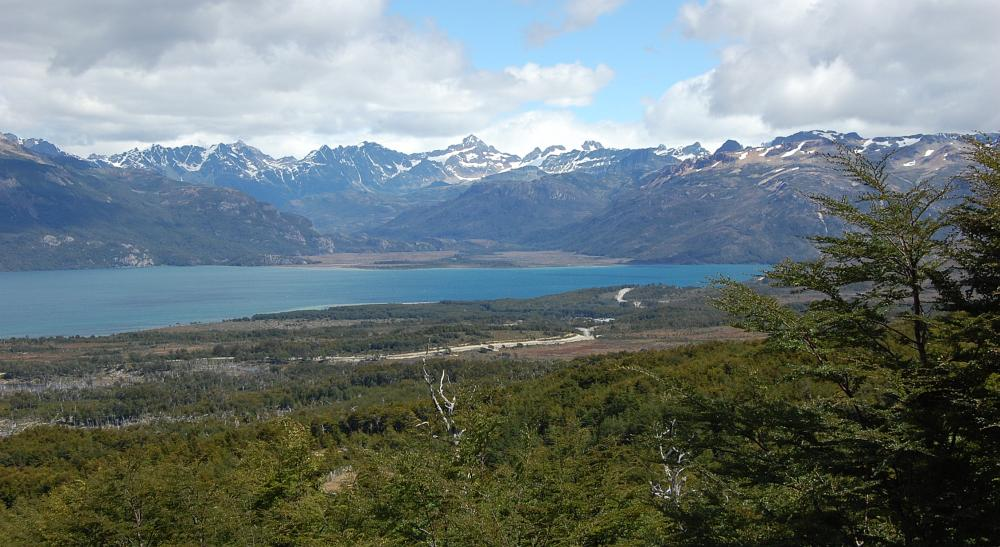
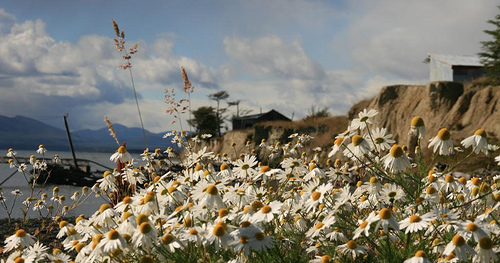
Left: Lago Fagnano. Right: flowers on the shores of the lake

Lago Fagnano (named after the Salesian monk José Fagnano), also known as Cami Lake, the southernmost lake of its size outside Antarctica, is the largest lake in Tierra del Fuego and flows southward along the eastern slope of the Andean Cordillera of Patagonia into the Magellan Strait through the Azopardo River. It is hemmed in the active tectonic plate (linked to the Magallanes-Fagnano fault) boundary between the South American and Scotia plates. Its East–west orientation in the southern part of Isla Grande de Tierra del Fuego encompasses the national territories of Argentina and Chile; only a small part of the lake lies in Chile. Its evolution is attributed to constant glaciation during the late Pliocene and Pleistocene era. The lake has a total drainage area of 3,042 km^{2} (1,175 sq mi) with basin elevation ranging from 27 m (89 ft) at the lake level to about 1,000 m (3,300 ft). The lake water spreads over an area of about 645 km^{2} (249 sq mi), with an average width of 6 km (3.7 mi) (maximum width is 10 km (6.2 mi) over a length of 104 km (65 mi) long and the maximum recorded depth is 204 m (669 ft), with an average depth reported as 70 m (230 ft). Its water volume is 1,000 km^{3} (240 cu mi).

=== Climate ===
The park experiences a temperate climate with frequent rain, fog, and strong winds. Westerly winds over the sea maintain a uniform climate in the park. The average annual rainfall is 700 mm (28 in). Peak rainfall (snowfall at higher elevations) occurs from March through May; no dry season exists. Average temperatures are about 0 °C (32 °F) in winter and 10 °C (50 °F) in the summer. At Ushuaia, the recorded mean annual temperature reported is 5.4 °C (41.7 °F) with maximum monthly mean of 14.2 °C (57.6 °F) and minimum of −10.4 °C (13.3 °F).

== History ==
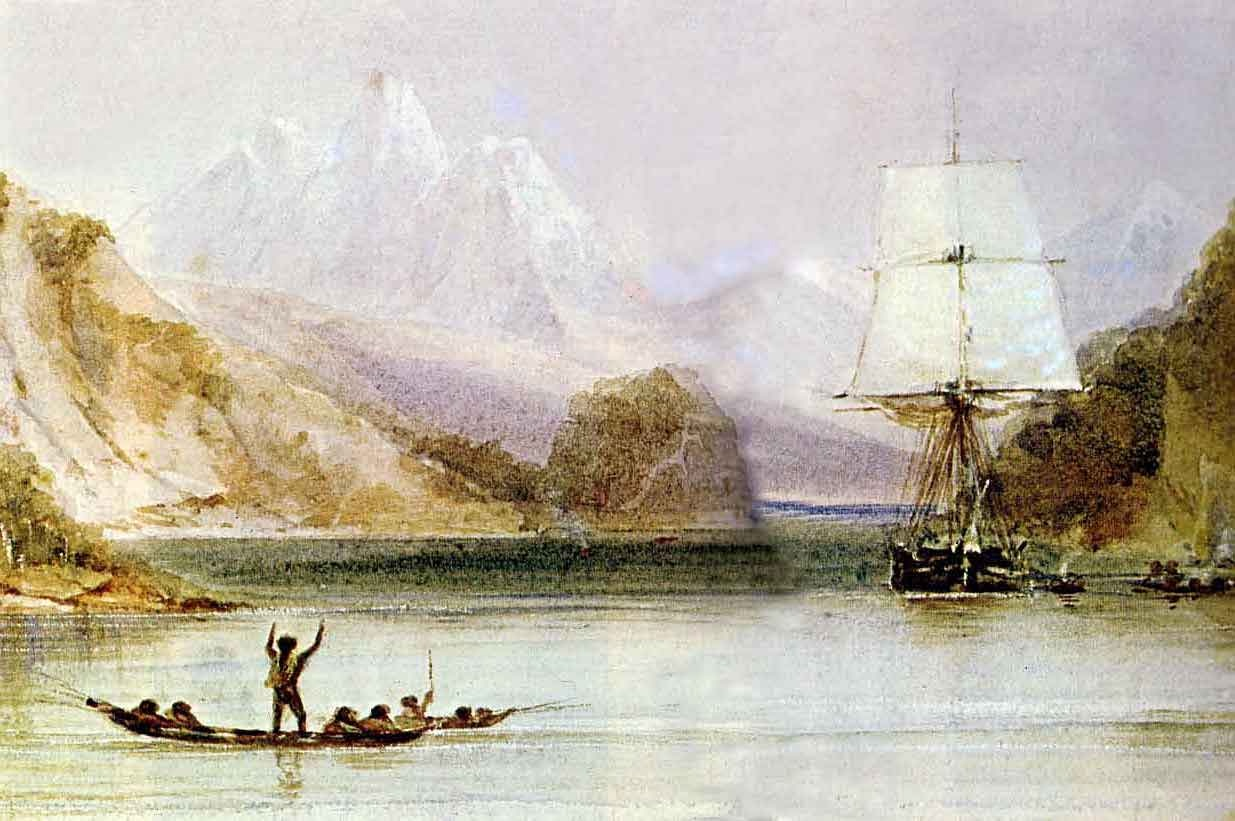
Period impression of HMS Beagle navigating along Tierra del Fuego, 1833

=== Etymology ===
The first Europeans who came to explore the southern tip of South America saw the campfires of the native inhabitants of the area (the Yaghan people, also called Yámana). The Spanish explorers hence named the area "Tierra del Fuego", meaning "land of the fires" in Spanish.

=== Pre-Columbian ===
Humans inhabited Tierra del Fuego as far back as 10,000 years ago. The Yaghan people, living in the harsh environment, survived on the natural resources of the sea. They lived on its beaches and made voyages into the sea in canoes made of lenga beech, hunted sea lions, and collected shellfish. They lived in huts made of tree branches and trunks and clothed themselves with leather made from sea lion pelts. They smeared their body with the fat and grease of these animals to waterproof their skins.

The southern group of the Selk’nam, the Yaghan people (also known as Yámana), occupied what is now Ushuaia, living in continual conflict with the northern inhabitants of the island.

=== Post-Columbian ===
Wasti H. Stirling, an Anglican missionary, settled here in 1870 and started to convert Yaghan tribes, the natives, the original residents of the Beagle Channel.

During the 1880s, many gold prospectors came to Ushuaia, following rumors of large gold fields, which proved to be false.

Trouble for the Yaghan people began in 1880 when European missionaries entered the area. European settlers brought diseases such as measles, causing a rapid and nearly complete extinction of the Yaghan people. The Yaghan tribe was reduced in number from about 3,000 people in 1880 to less than 100 by the 1990s. Many of them were killed by European settlers' "shoot exercises" and deliberate poisoning to exploit the sea lions, the staple of the Yaghan diet. Following the deaths of 84-year-old Emelinda Acuña (1921 – 12 October 2005) and her sister Cristina Calderón (1928 - 2022) of Villa Ukika on Navarino Island, Chile, no native speakers remain. What can be seen of the Yaghan people and their settlements today are mainly relics in the form of piles of mussel shells overgrown with grass near the seashore. Some antiquarian links with the tribals can also be seen in the "End of the World Museum" in Ushuaia.

The Boundary Treaty of 1881 was an attempted resolution of the territorial dispute between Argentina and Chile, and stipulated that the boundary between the two countries would run south from "Cape Espiritu Santo, on the northern shore of Tierra del Fuego till it touches the Beagle Channel". This division meant that Argentina would be entitled to the eastern portion while Chile would have the western part of the Tierra del Fuego. However, the Treaty did not clarify the terminus of the Beagle Channel, which created many territorial and collateral issues such as navigation rights. This resulted in a dispute between the two countries, particularly on the small islands (Picton, Lennox, and Nueva) up to Cape horn. The dispute, which started in 1840, almost resulted in war between the two countries in 1978. However, the issue was resolved with the intervention of the Vatican. The Pope ruled on the dispute, ratification ensued and a treaty was signed on 2 May 1985. Under this treaty, Chile retained control of all the disputed islands, and Argentina was entitled to navigational rights and maintained its limited presence on these islands.

After an Argentine naval base was established in 1884, the island was divided between Argentina and Chile.

Argentinian President Roca established a penal colony in 1902, on nearby Staten Island, which resulted in its development. Prisoners were the main workforce and were employed to construct the city and exploit the forests of the now Tierra del Fuego National Park. The train lines were also built by the prisoners, covering an area of 25 km (16 mi), which started from the Maipú Monte Susana camp and ran through the park. The city is now an important tourist center as the departure point not only for the park but also for voyages to Antarctica.

Following the establishment of a prison in Ushuaia, in late 1909 and early 1910 the railway line called the Southern Fuegian Railway or the End of the World train was established as a narrow gauge steam railway, replacing an old wood track railway drawn by bullocks. The steam engine-driven railway was built over a length of 25 km (16 mi) along the Maipu Avenue on the waterfront, followed the eastern slope of Mount Susana, and branched through the middle of the Pipo River valley into the Tierra del Fuego National Park. The line made with Decauville tracks of 500 mm (20 in) gauge, connected the prison camp with the forestry camp. The primary purpose of the railway was as a freight line to serve the prison of Ushuaia, and hence was known as the "Prison train", and was used specifically to transport prisoners to the camps and transport the logged timber from forests. The prison was closed in 1947, and the railway was finally closed in 1952, following the reduction in forest resources and an earthquake that damaged the tracks.

== Tourism ==
There are several attractions within the park including the Beagle Channel, the Pipo River cascade, the Lago Fagnano, Lago Roca, the Ensanada Bay, the Lapataia Bay, the End of the World Train, and the Laguna Negra.

=== End of the World train ===
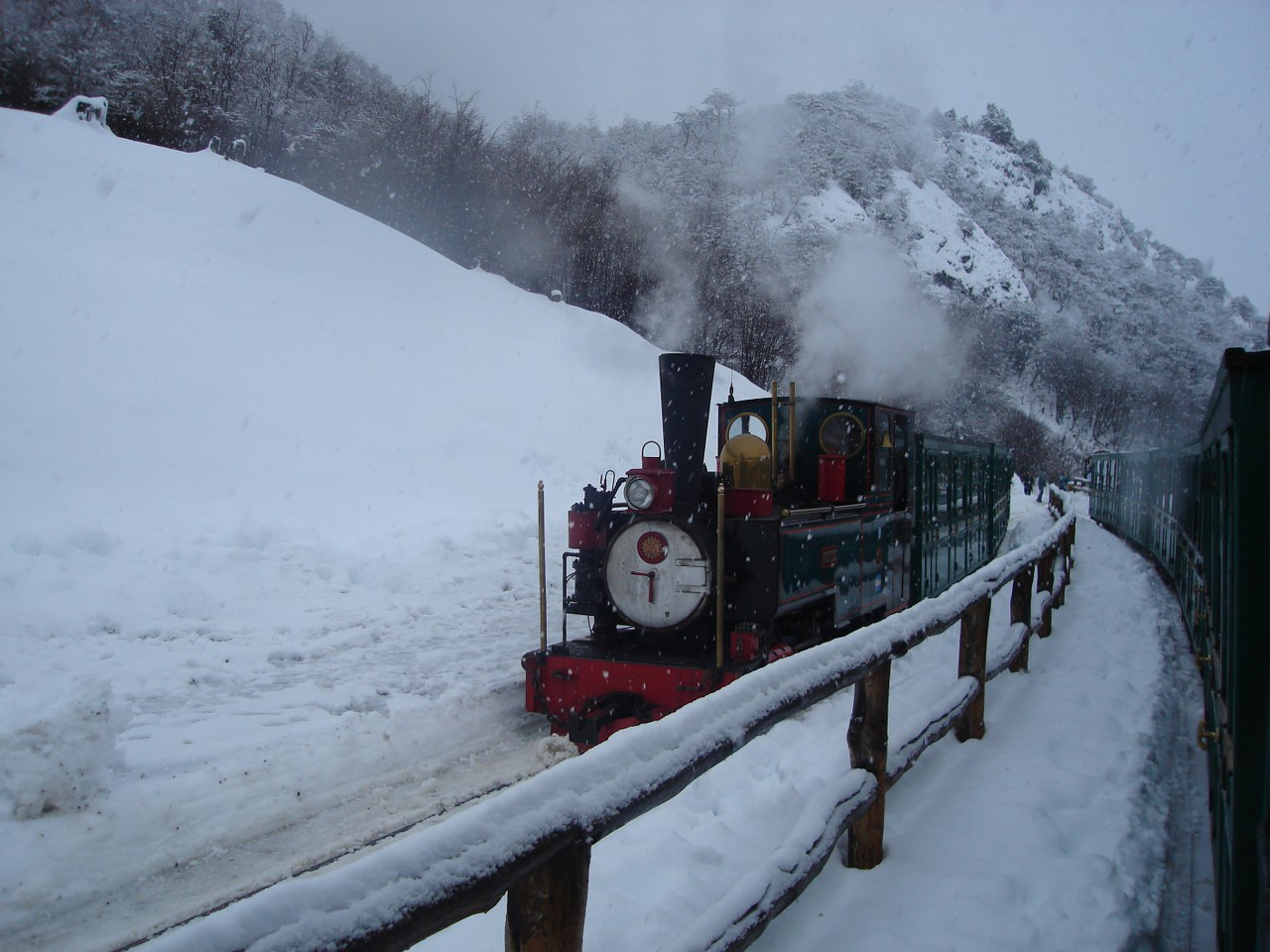
Southern Fuegian Railway in winter

In 1994, 40 years after it had been closed as a Prison train, the train was revived, refurbished with modern amenities, used as a heritage train, and claimed to be the southernmost functioning railway in the world. A new 2-6-2T steam locomotive (Camila, brought from England in 1995), another made in Argentina, and three diesel locomotives serve on the line. The park can now be reached from the outskirts of Ushuaia from the Fin del Mundo station (8 km (5.0 mi) west of Ushuaia) by the heritage railway line and runs over 5 km (3.1 mi), covering the distance in about 50 minutes.

== See also ==
- Treaty of Peace and Friendship of 1984 between Chile and Argentina
