= Buckskin Glacier =

Glacier in the United States

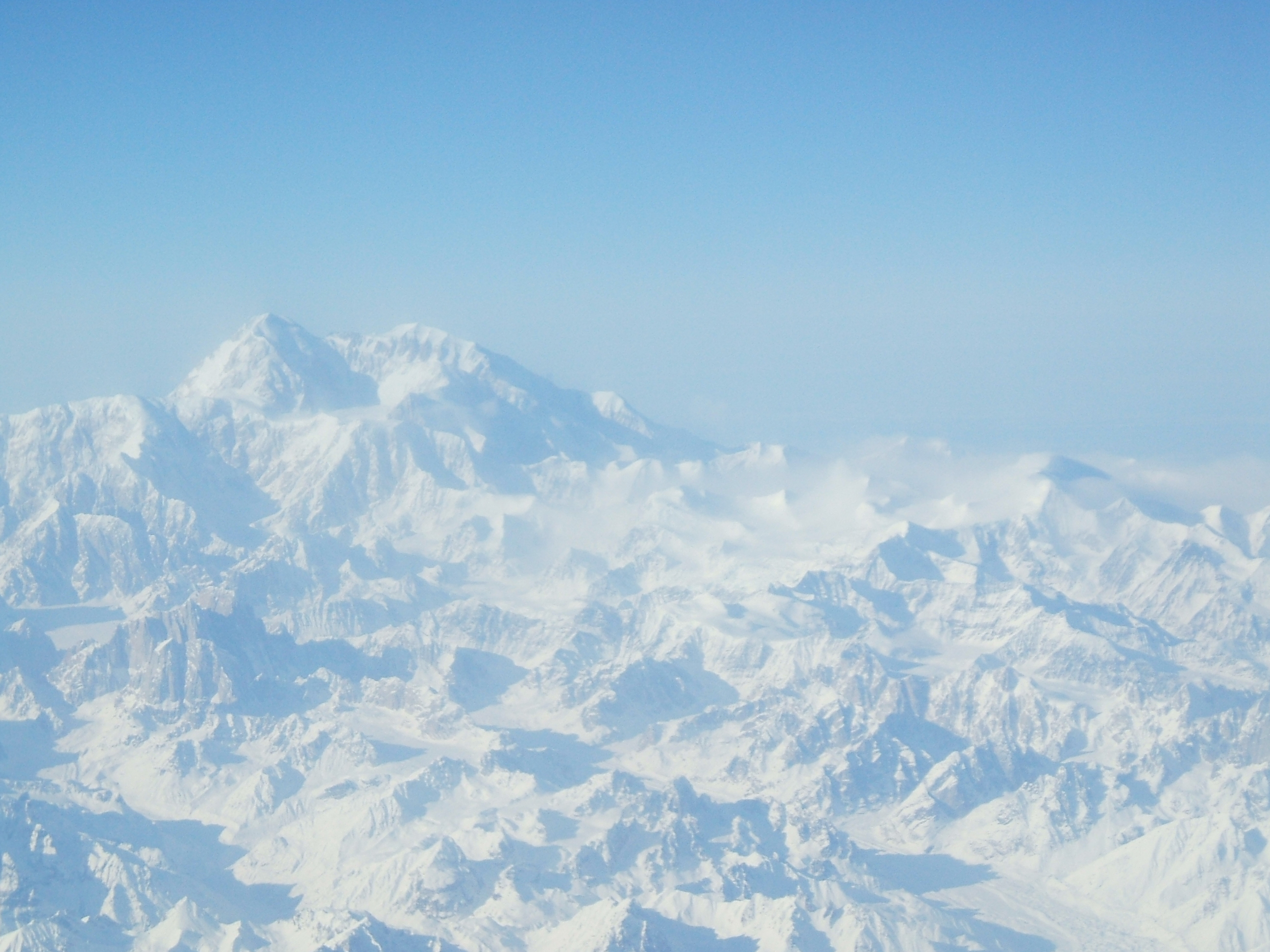
- Buckskin Glacier

- Location within Alaska
- Interactive map of Buckskin Glacier
- Type: Valley glacier
- Location: Matanuska-Susitna Borough, Alaska, U.S.
- Coordinates: 62°59′09″N 150°21′50″W
- Length: 14 miles (23 km)
- Terminus: Hidden River
- Status: Retreating

Buckskin Glacier is a glacier in Denali National Park and Preserve in the U.S. state of Alaska. The glacier originates on the east side of The Moose's Tooth, flowing east, then southeast, for 14 miles (23 km) before giving rise to the Hidden River.

== See also ==
- List of glaciers
