= Tolhuin =

- Town
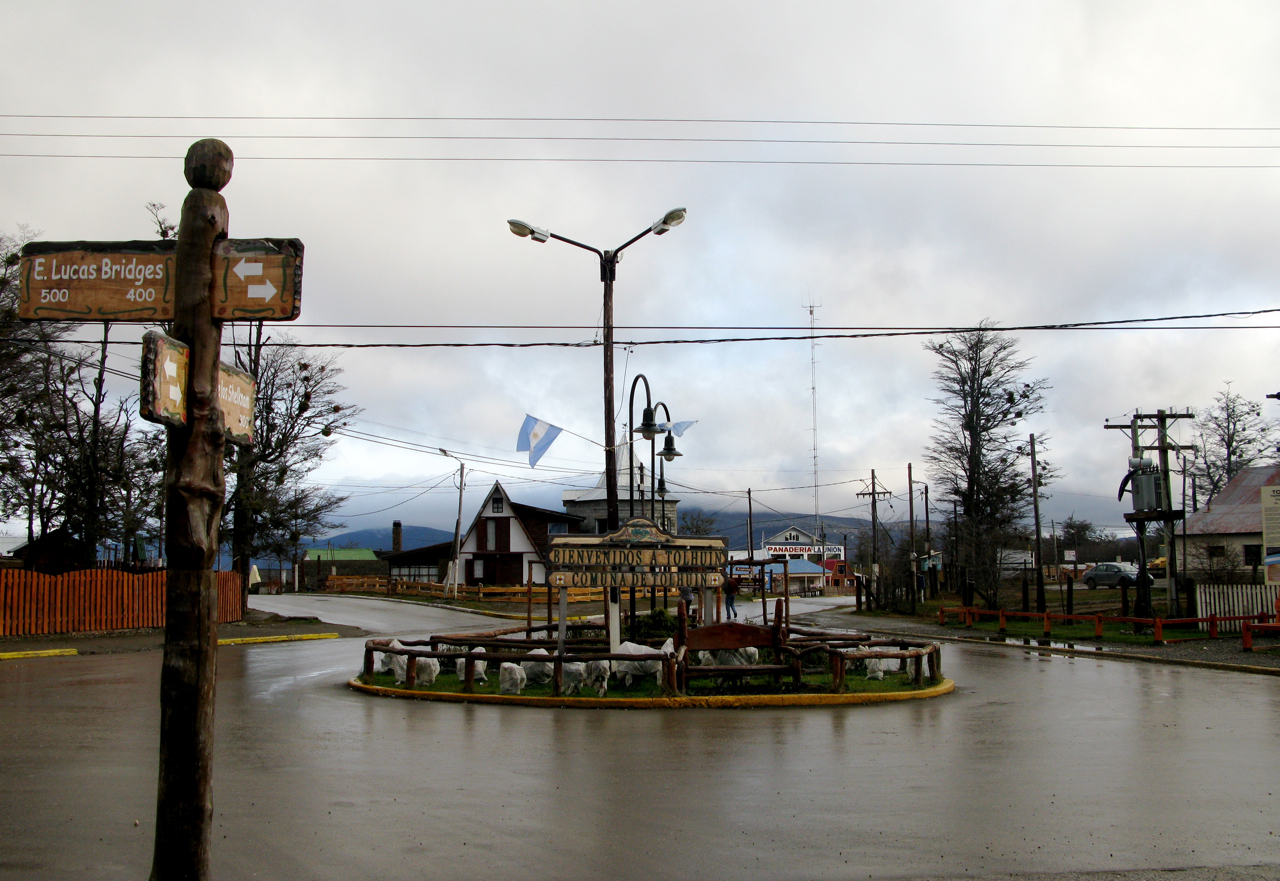

- Flag Coat of arms

- Location of Tolhuin in Argentina
- Coordinates: 54°30.37′S 67°11.43′W
- Country: Argentina
- Province: Tierra del Fuego
- Department: Tolhuin

Government
  - Type: Municipality
  - Intendant: Daniel Harrington (PJ)

Area
  - Total: 54 km^{2} (21 sq mi)

Population (2022)
  - Total: 9,879
  - Density: 183/km^{2} (470/sq mi)
- Time zone: UTC−3 (ART)
- CPA base: V9412
- Dialing code: +54 2901
- Climate: ET

Tolhuin is a town in the province of Tierra del Fuego, Argentina. It has 9,879 inhabitants as per the 2022 census. It is located on the eastern shore of Lake Fagnano, in the southern part of the Isla Grande de Tierra del Fuego. It is the third largest settlement on the Argentine side of Tierra del Fuego after Ushuaia and Río Grande.

Tolhuin was founded on October 9, 1972. The word means "like a heart" in Selkʼnam language. It lies on National Route 3, and is the only town between the cities of Ushuaia (about 103 kilometres to the south) and Río Grande (about 133 kilometres to the north) on this motorway.

== Attractions ==
There is a bakery called Panadería La Unión located in the town center that has become famous in the region. Most buses going to Ushuaia stop here so their passengers can have a coffee, and eat baked goods. The bakery's walls are lined with autographed photographs of Argentine celebrities who have visited the town over the decades.

== Top Gear incident ==
In 2014, Tolhuin was the site of an attack on the film crew of the BBC TV program Top Gear. The crew was confronted by what the presenters called "a mob", who blocked off the road access and began to pelt their cars with stones in a protest over the license plate (H982 FKL) on programme presenter Jeremy Clarkson's Porsche 928 that politicians and army veterans suggested could be seen to refer to the Falklands War. Following the attack, the crew abandoned the damaged vehicles at a police checkpoint and left the country.

== Climate ==
Tolhuin has a tundra climate (ET) that borders closely on a subpolar oceanic climate (Cfc) and subantarctic continental climate (Dfc).

Climate data for Tolhuin (1991–2010)
Month	Jan	Feb	Mar	Apr	May	Jun	Jul	Aug	Sep	Oct	Nov	Dec	Year
Record high °C (°F)	24.8 (76.6)	26.6 (79.9)	22.8 (73.0)	21.3 (70.3)	13.0 (55.4)	9.8 (49.6)	9.3 (48.7)	11.8 (53.2)	18.3 (64.9)	17.8 (64.0)	22.4 (72.3)	23.4 (74.1)	26.6 (79.9)
Mean daily maximum °C (°F)	14.1 (57.4)	13.9 (57.0)	12.0 (53.6)	8.9 (48.0)	5.4 (41.7)	2.7 (36.9)	2.5 (36.5)	4.3 (39.7)	6.9 (44.4)	9.9 (49.8)	11.9 (53.4)	13.2 (55.8)	8.8 (47.8)
Daily mean °C (°F)	9.4 (48.9)	9.0 (48.2)	7.1 (44.8)	4.6 (40.3)	1.6 (34.9)	−0.9 (30.4)	−1.3 (29.7)	0.7 (33.3)	2.8 (37.0)	5.1 (41.2)	6.9 (44.4)	8.4 (47.1)	4.5 (40.1)
Mean daily minimum °C (°F)	4.7 (40.5)	4.0 (39.2)	2.3 (36.1)	0.3 (32.5)	−2.2 (28.0)	−4.5 (23.9)	−5.0 (23.0)	−3.0 (26.6)	−1.4 (29.5)	0.3 (32.5)	2.0 (35.6)	3.6 (38.5)	0.1 (32.2)
Record low °C (°F)	−2.5 (27.5)	−3.6 (25.5)	−7.0 (19.4)	−7.8 (18.0)	−12.7 (9.1)	−23.0 (−9.4)	−23.5 (−10.3)	−17.0 (1.4)	−18.6 (−1.5)	−7.4 (18.7)	−7.2 (19.0)	−6.0 (21.2)	−23.5 (−10.3)
Average precipitation mm (inches)	64.4 (2.54)	46.4 (1.83)	54.1 (2.13)	51.7 (2.04)	52.0 (2.05)	49.8 (1.96)	41.6 (1.64)	41.4 (1.63)	38.1 (1.50)	35.8 (1.41)	40.7 (1.60)	59.8 (2.35)	575.8 (22.67)
Source: Servicio Meteorológico Nacional
