= Southern Fuegian Railway =

Steam railway in Tierra del Fuego Province, Argentina

Coordinates: 54.833164°S 68.424°W

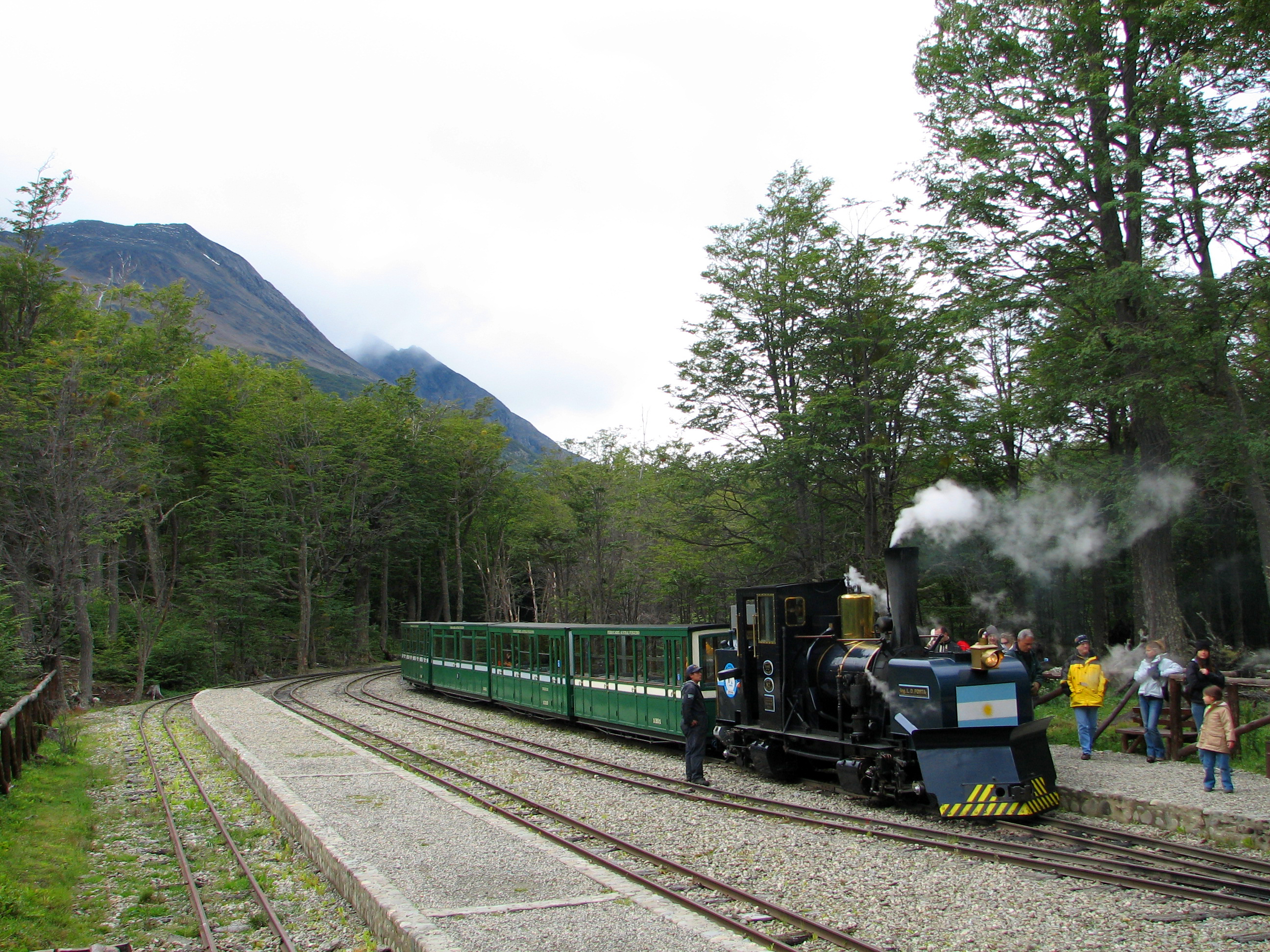
- Train at Macarena station

Overview
- Native name: Tren del Fin del Mundo
- Status: Active
- Owner: Ferrocarril Austral Fueguino
- Locale: Tierra del Fuego, Argentina
- Termini: Del Fin del Mundo; Parque Nacional
- Website: trendelfindelmundo.com.ar

Service
- Type: Heritage railway
- Services: 1

History
- Opened: 1910
- Reopened: 1994; 31 years ago
- Closed: 1952

Technical
- Track length: 7 km (4.3 mi)
- Track gauge: 500 mm (19 3/4 in)
- Old gauge: 600 mm (1 ft 11 5/8 in)
- Operating speed: 25 km/h (16 mph)

The Southern Fuegian Railway (Spanish: Ferrocarril Austral Fueguino (FCAF)) or the Train of the End of the World (Spanish: El Tren del Fin del Mundo) is a 500 mm (19 3/4 in) gauge steam railway in Tierra del Fuego Province, Argentina. It was originally built as a freight line to serve the prison of Ushuaia, specifically to transport rock, sand and lumber. It now operates as a heritage railway into the Tierra del Fuego National Park and is considered the southernmost functioning railway in the world.

== History ==
=== Origins ===
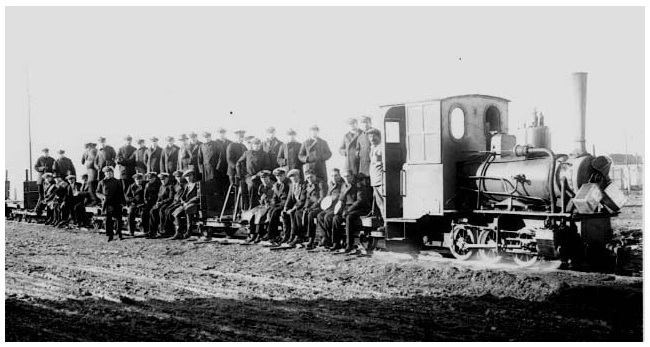
Train carrying jail staff, 1920

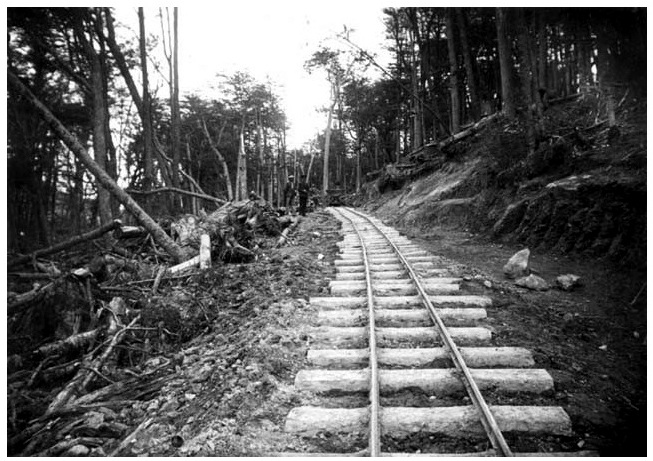
Rail tracks into the forest, 1920

In the late 19th century, Ushuaia on Isla Grande de Tierra del Fuego developed as a penal colony, with the first prisoners arriving in 1884. In 1902, work began on a proper set of buildings for the prison by inmates, and a railway on wooden rails was constructed to assist the transport of materials, mainly local rock, sand and lumber. Oxen pulled wagons along the narrow gauge of less than 1,000 mm (3 ft 3 3/8 in) metre gauge.

In 1909, the prison governor informed the government of the need to upgrade the line. Decauville tracks at a 600 mm (1 ft 11 5/8 in) narrow gauge were laid for use with two steam locomotives. The upgraded line opened in 1910. It connected the prison camp with the forestry camp and passed along the shoreline in front of the growing town of Ushuaia. The trains running on the line were known as the 'Train of the Prisoners' (Tren de los Presos) and brought wood for heating and cooking as well as building.

The railway was gradually extended further into the forest into more remote areas as wood was exhausted. It followed the valley of the Pipo River into the higher terrain. Constant building allowed expansion of the prison and of the town, with prisoners providing many services and goods.

In 1947 the prison was closed, and in 1950 it was replaced by a naval base. In the meantime, the 1949 Tierra del Fuego earthquake blocked much of the line. Initially, the railway line remained open to serve local sawmills. After the earthquake, the government made efforts to clear the line and get trains running on it again, but it was not viable and closed in 1952.

=== Rebirth as a tourist railway ===
In 1994, the railway was rebuilt in 500 mm (19 3/4 in) track gauge and began services again, although now as a heritage railway, the "Train of the End of the World". A new 2-6-2T steam locomotive (Camila) was brought from England in 1995. As of 2025, the line was operated by Camila, two Garratt steam locomotives, Héctor J. Rodríguez Zubieta and the Argentinian-built Eng. LD Porta, and two diesel–mechanical locomotives.

Services leave from the 'End of the World' station (about 8 km (5.0 mi) from Ushuaia). The route takes passengers along the Pico Valley in the Toro gorge and to Cascada de la Macarena station where visitors are able to learn about the Yámana people and climb to a viewpoint at a 15-minute stop. The train then criss-crosses the river before entering the national park and the forest, travelling through the valley below the mountains until it reaches El Parque station.

There is a plan to extend the line to a new station closer to Ushuaia and connect the station to the city with a tram.

== In popular culture ==
The train served as inspiration to singer Michale Graves in the song "Train to the End of the World" of his 2013 album Vagabond.

== Gallery ==
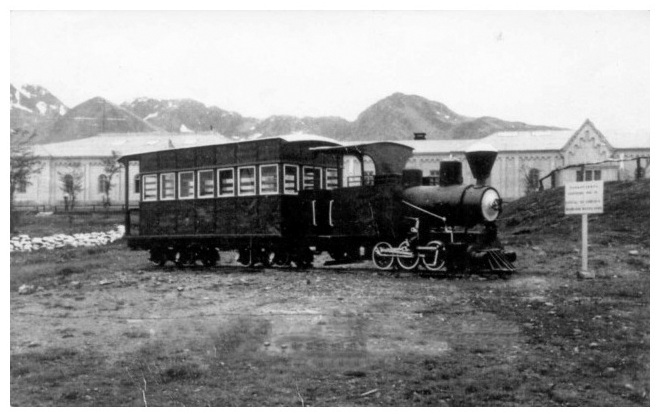
Train with passengers, 1930

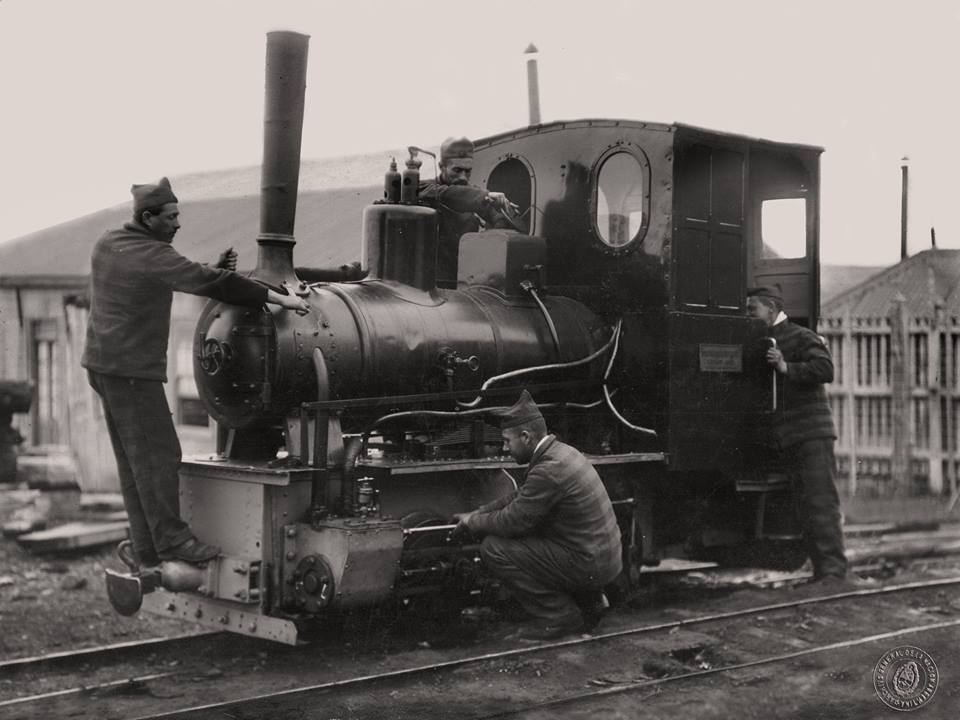
Convicts adjusting a locomotive, 1931

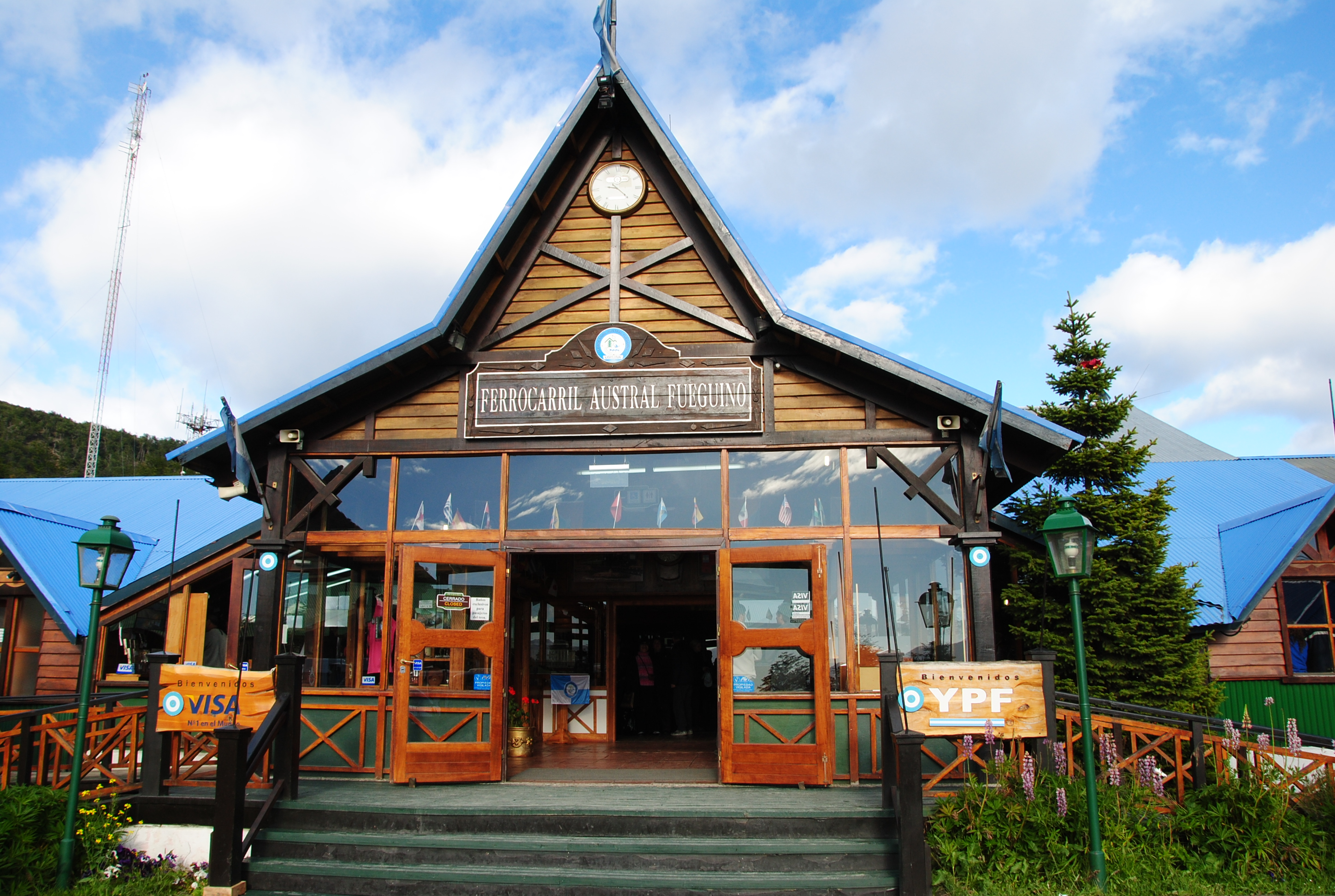
Fin del Mundo station

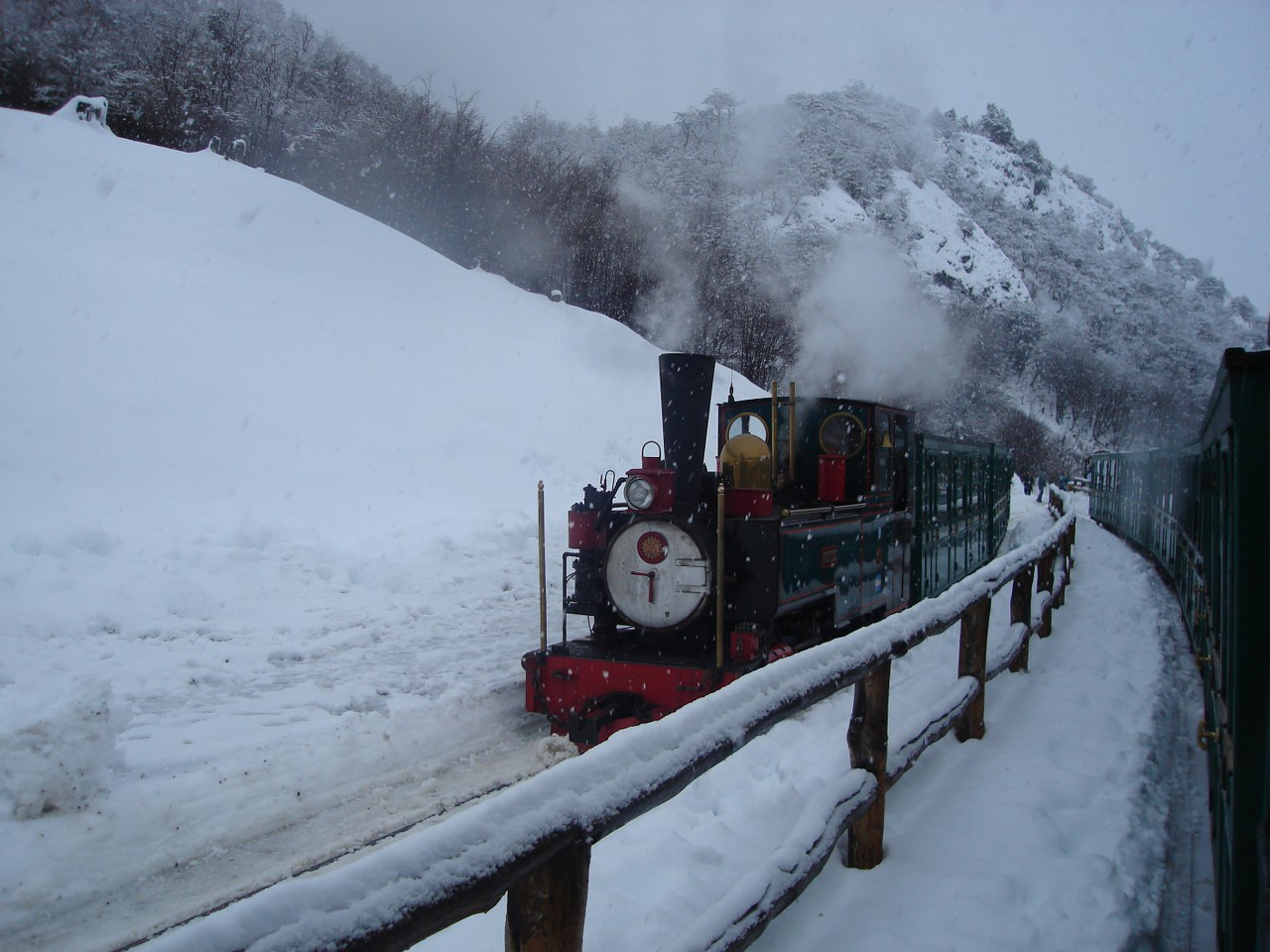
Train in Winter scene, 2008

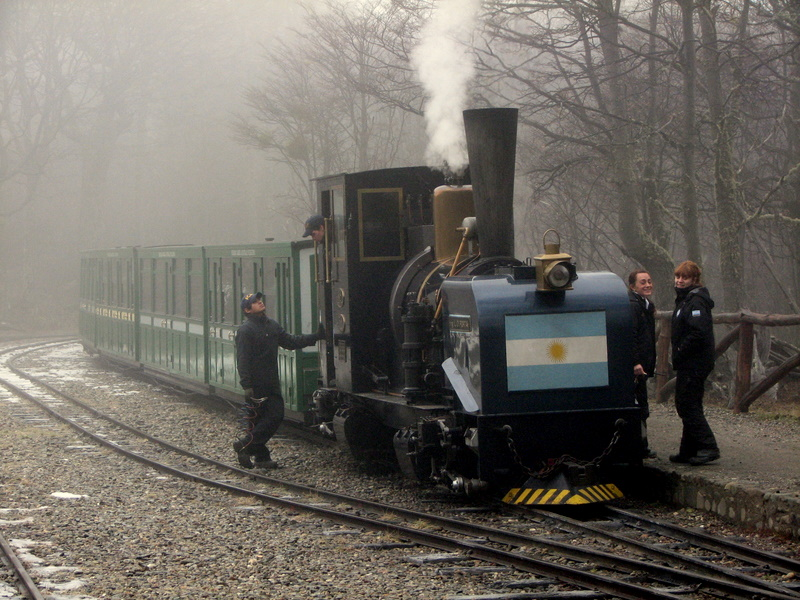
Locomotive, 2010

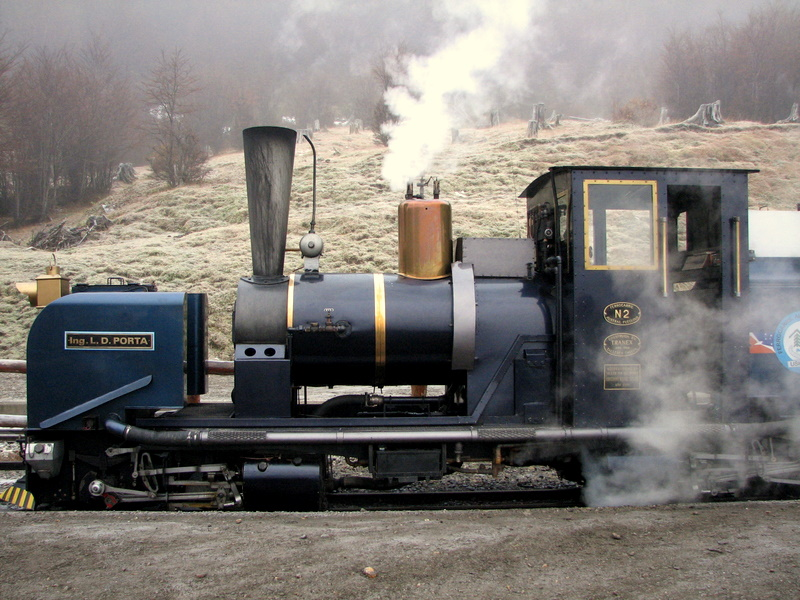
N° 2 locomotive

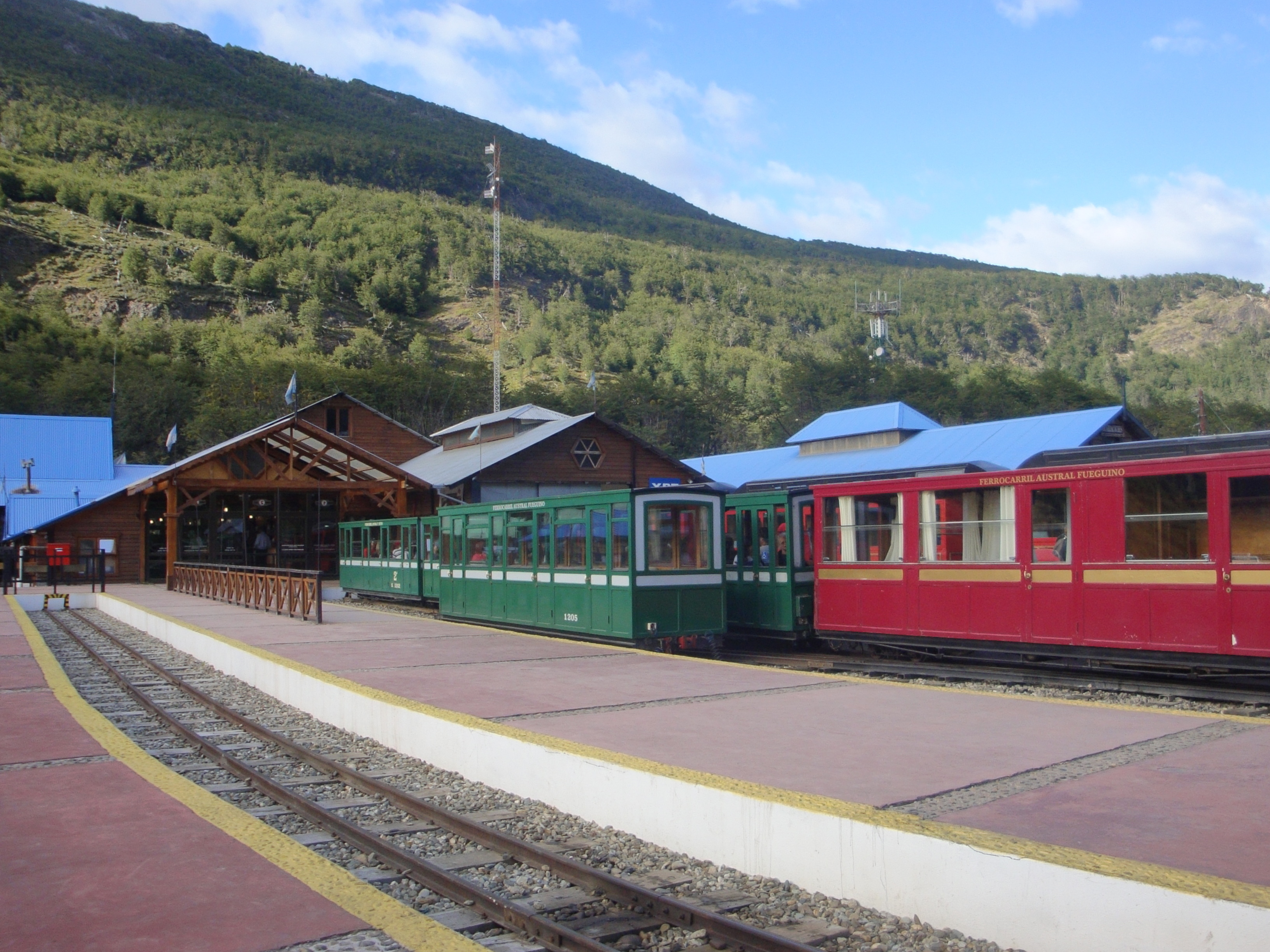
Train at Fin del Mundo station

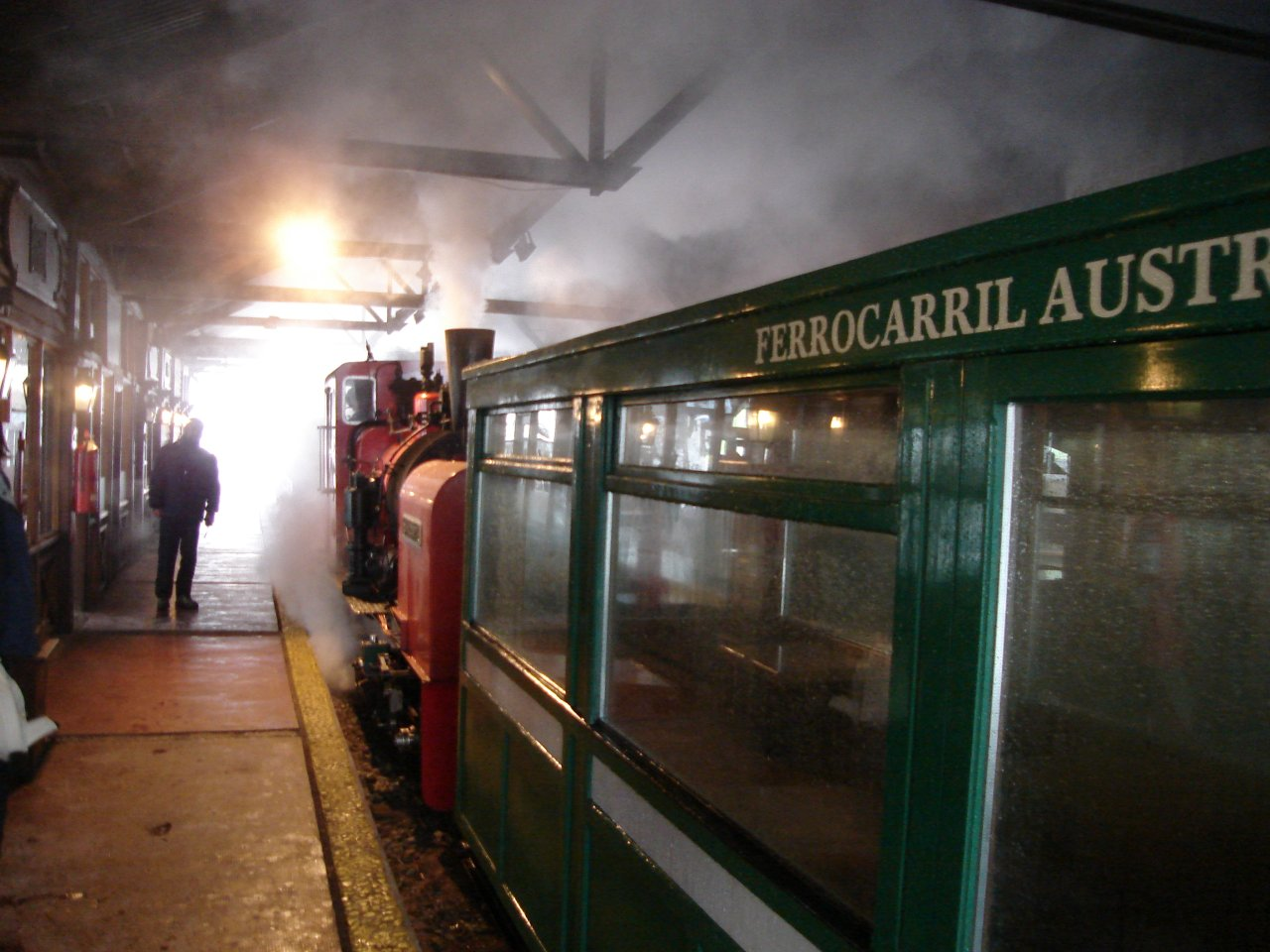
Arriving at terminal

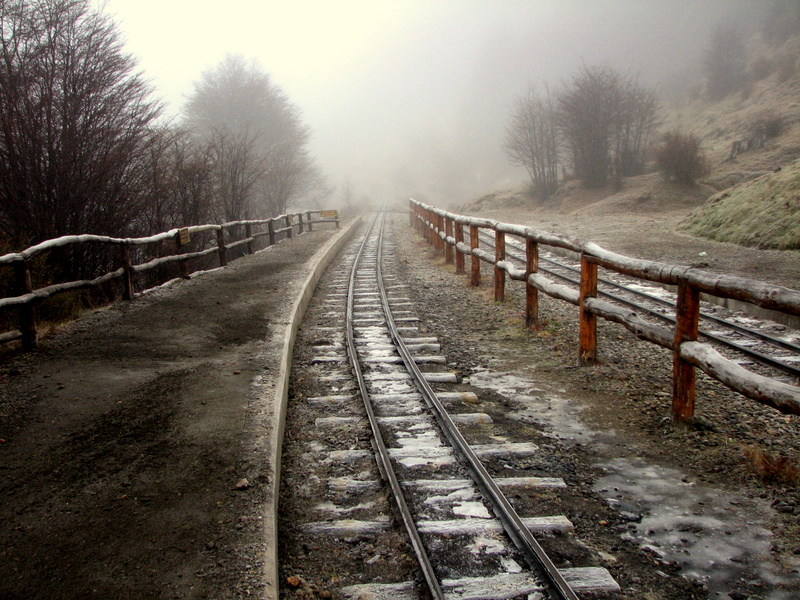
Rail tracks

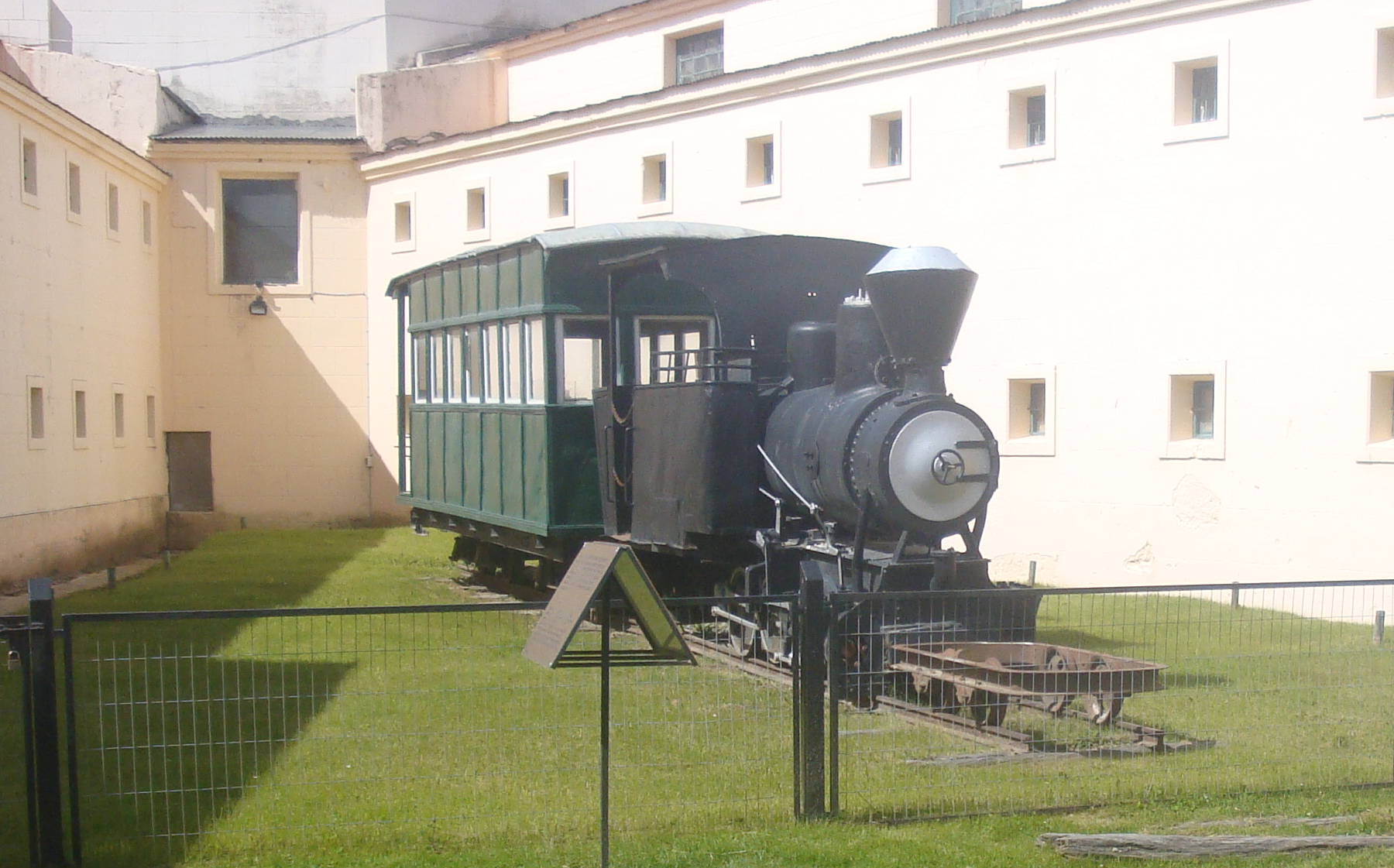
Preserved original train

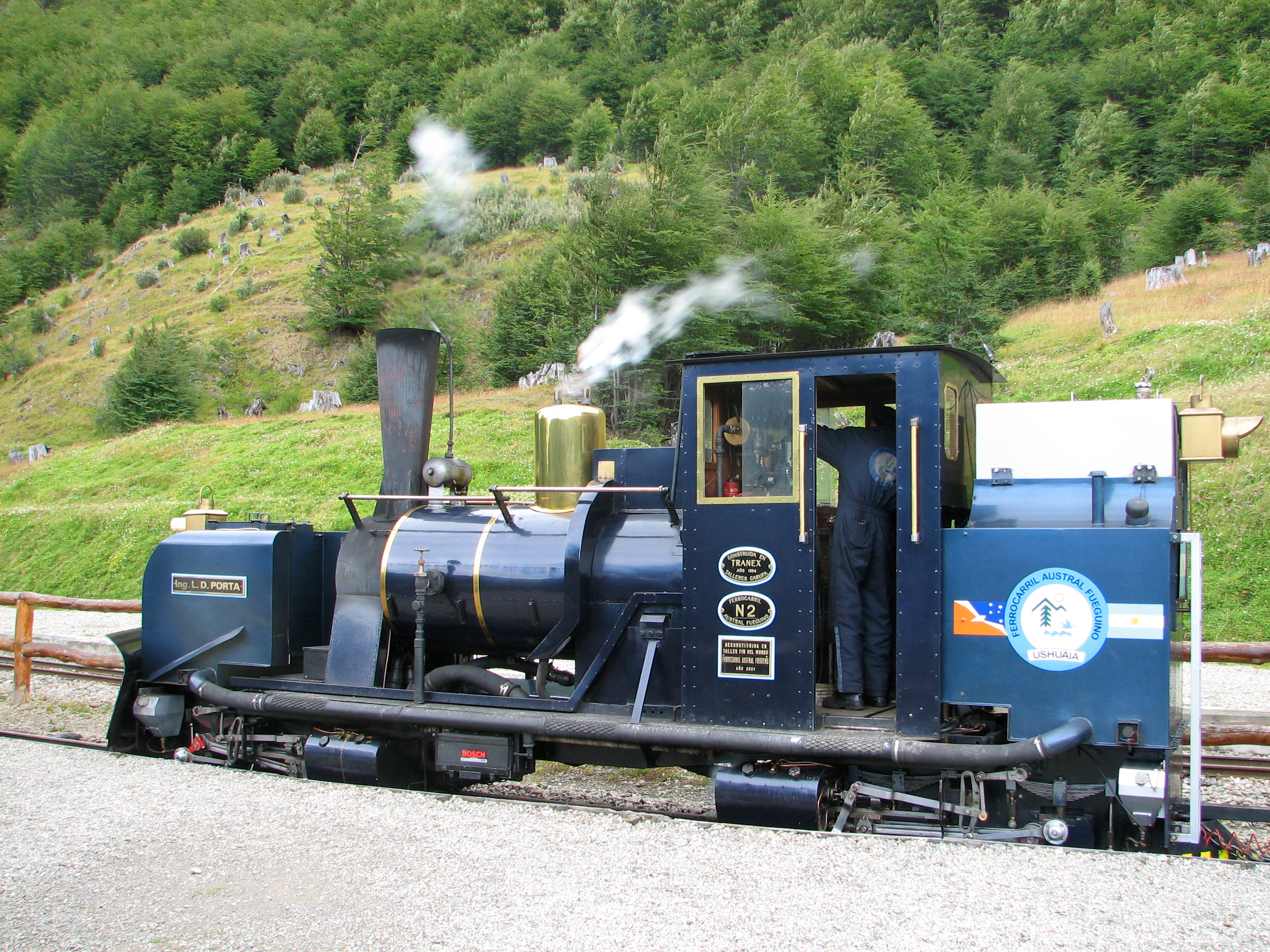
Ing. Porta locomotive

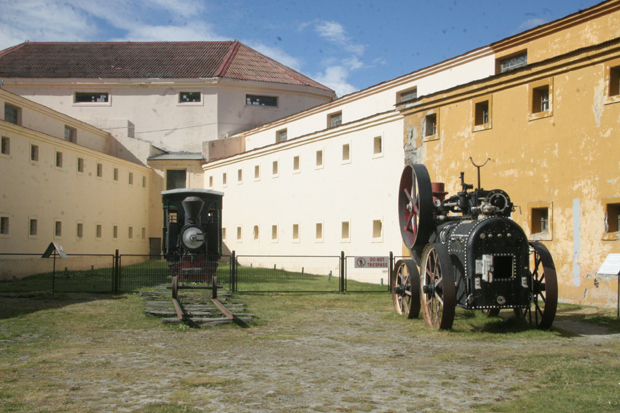
Train at Ushuaia Museum

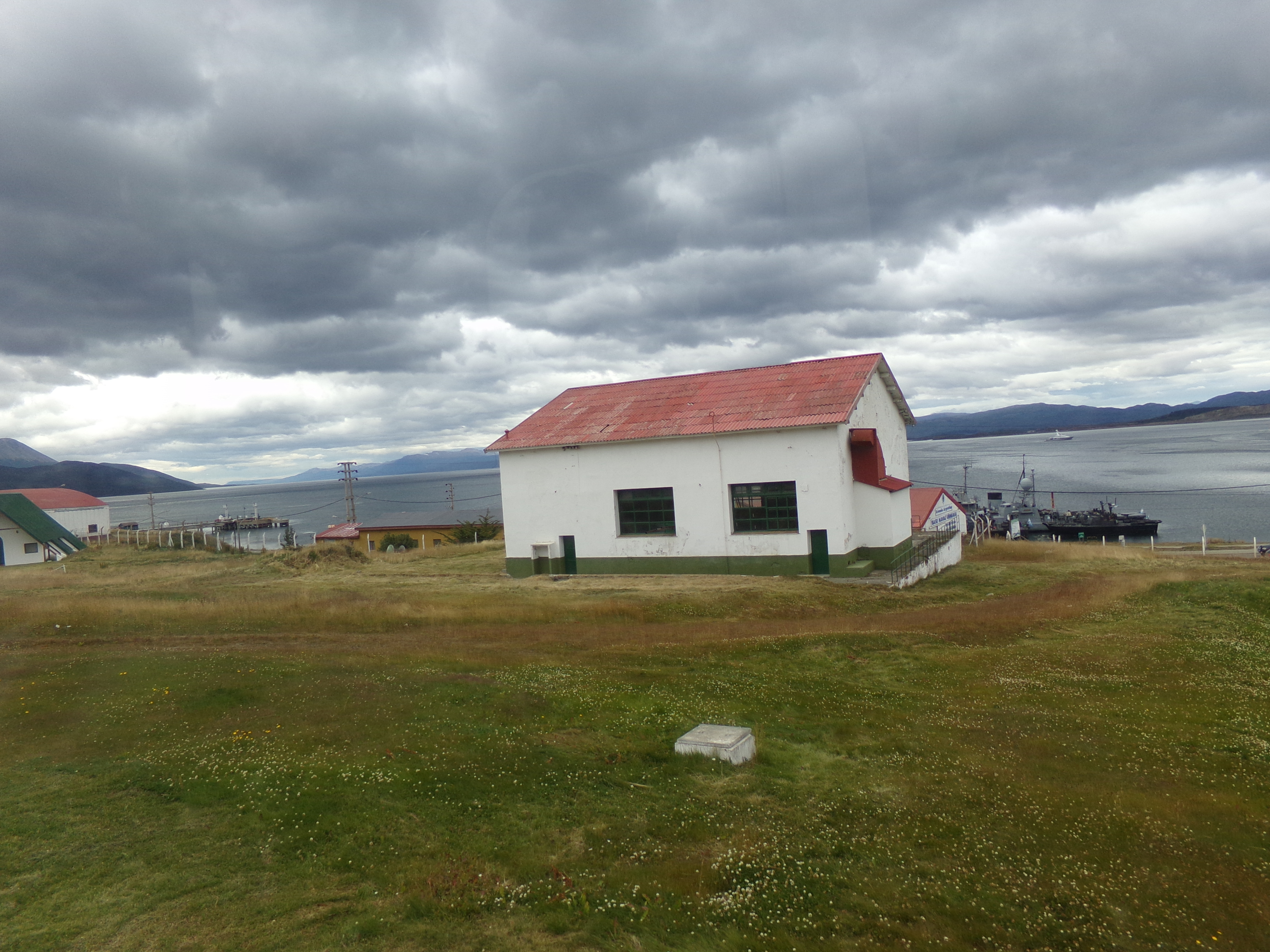
Old station terminus

== See also ==
- List of heritage railways
