= Deseado Lake =

Lake in Chile and Argentina

- Location within Southern Patagonia
- Location: Río Grande Department / Tolhuin Department, Tierra del Fuego Province, Argentina / Tierra del Fuego Province, Magallanes and Antártica Chilena Region, Chile
- Coordinates: 54°22′41.4″S 68°40′33.55″W
- Primary outflows: De la Turba River
- Basin countries: Argentina, Chile
- Max. length: 10.7 km (6.6 mi)
- Max. width: 1.1 km (0.68 mi)
- Surface elevation: 169 m (554 ft)

Deseado Lake (Spanish: Lago Deseado) is a lake located on the main island of the Tierra del Fuego archipelago. The lake has an east–west orientation and is bounded by mountains to the north and south. Most of the lake lies in Chile while the eastern end lies in Argentina. The lake lies in Lago Deseado Fault Zone.
