= Magallanes-Fagnano Fault =

Continental transform fault between the Scotia plate and the South American plate

The Magallanes–Fagnano Fault (Spanish: Falla Fagnano–Magallanes) is a continental transform fault. The fault marks a transform boundary between the Scotia plate and the South American plate, cutting across continental crust. It runs under the Strait of Magellan's western arm, Almirantazgo Sound and Fagnano Lake.

It has been suggested that the Magallanes-Fagnano Fault is a reactivated suture of pre-Jurassic age separating the basement of two terranes.
