= Lago Escondido =

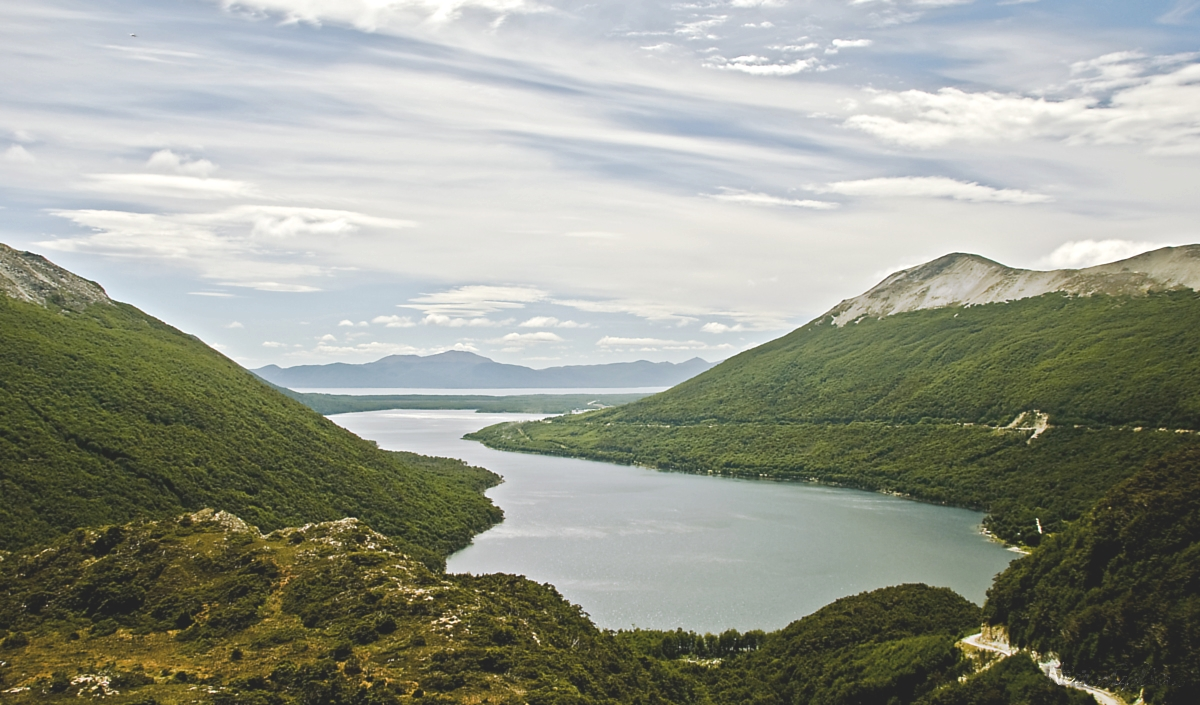

- Location within Southern Patagonia
- Coordinates: 54°32′0″S 67°12′0″W
- Country: Argentina
- Region: Patagonia
- Province: Tierra del Fuego Province
- Department: Ushuaia Department

Population (2001)
  - Total: 71
- Time zone: UTC−3 (ART)
- Climate: ET

Lago Escondido (Spanish for Hidden Lake) is a village and lake in the Ushuaia department in Tierra del Fuego Province, Argentina. As of 2001 it has a population of 71, growing from 46 in 1991.

The villages which thrives lives mainly on logging and tourism, is located 57 km north of Ushuaia. There is a major sawmill works and timber operation in the area.

Lago Escondido is situated on the east side of the Andean Patagonian Cordillera, is surrounded by forests and steep mountain ranges. The lake on which the village lies (and shares the same name) tends to change color depending on the sunlight.

== See also ==
- Escondido Lake
