= Río Escondido =

Río Escondido may refer to:

- Escondido River (disambiguation), several rivers in the Americas
- Río Escondido (film), a 1948 Mexican film

== See also ==
- Hidden River
