= Schuylkill =

Schuylkill (/ˈskuːl.kɪl, -kəl/, SKOOL-kill, kəl) refers to the Schuylkill River in Pennsylvania.

Schuylkill may also refer to:

== Places in Pennsylvania ==
- Schuylkill Gap, water gap through Blue Mountain in Pennsylvania
- Schuylkill County, Pennsylvania
  - Schuylkill Township, Schuylkill County, Pennsylvania
  - Schuylkill Haven, Pennsylvania, borough in Schuylkill County
  - Penn State Schuylkill, a college in North Manheim Township, Pennsylvania
  - Schuylkill Institute of Business and Technology, Pottsville, Pennsylvania
  - Schuylkill Regional Medical Center, Pottsville, Pennsylvania
  - Schuylkill Mall, Frackville, Pennsylvania
- Schuylkill Township, Chester County, Pennsylvania
- Schuylkill, Philadelphia, neighborhood in South Philadelphia
- Southwest Schuylkill, neighborhood in West Philadelphia
- Schuylkill River Park, Philadelphia
- Schuylkill College, now Albright College, Reading, Pennsylvania

== Transport infrastructure ==
=== Road ===
- Schuylkill Expressway, a portion of Interstate 76 in the Philadelphia area
  - Schuylkill Expressway Bridge on the Schuylkill Expressway over the Schuylkill River
- Schuylkill River Bridge on the Pennsylvania Turnpike over the Schuylkill River
- Schuylkill Parkway, an unfinished portion of Pennsylvania Route 23

=== Rail ===
- Schuylkill Branch, rail line in Pennsylvania
- Schuylkill (train), a New York to Philadelphia train service
- Schuylkill River Passenger Rail, a proposed Philadelphia to Reading train service

=== Trail ===
- Schuylkill River Trail, an intercity multi-use trail along the river
  - Schuylkill Banks, a section of the Schuylkill River Trail in Philadelphia

=== Canal ===
- Schuylkill Canal, (1815-1931) a navigation system along the river from Port Carbon to Philadelphia, Pennsylvania

== Organizations ==
- Schuylkill Navy, a rowing association in Philadelphia
- Schuylkill Fishing Company, a social club
- Schuylkill Valley School District, Berks County, Pennsylvania
- Schuylkill and Susquehanna Navigation Company (1791-1811), a transportation company

== Other ==
- USS Schuylkill (AO-76), a naval fleet oiler
- Le Schuylkill, a high-rise residential building in Monaco
- Schuylkill notes, messages of unknown origin found in Pennsylvania

== See also ==
- Hidden River
