= Puerto Escondido (disambiguation) =

Puerto Escondido is a port city in Mexico.

Puerto Escondido may also refer to:

- Puerto Escondido, Córdoba, Colombia
- Puerto Escondido, Baja California Sur, Mexico
- Puerto escondido (film), a 1992 Italian film
