= Escondido Lake =

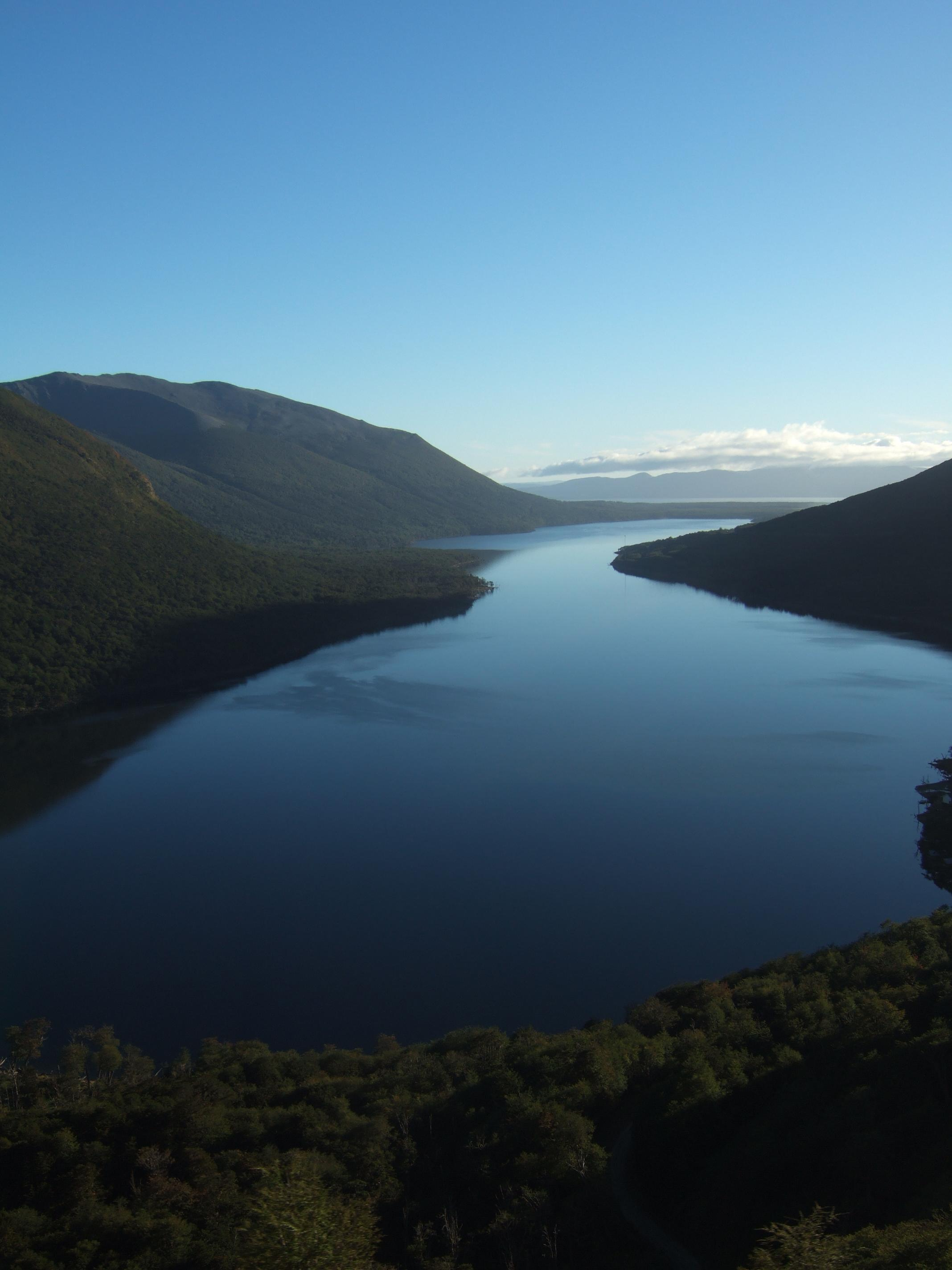

- Location within Argentina
- Location: Ushuaia Department, Tierra del Fuego Province, Patagonia
- Coordinates: 54.65°S 67.78°W
- Type: Glacial Lake
- Primary outflows: Milna river
- Basin countries: Argentina

Escondido Lake (Spanish: Lago Escondido) is a lake in Argentina. There is a settlement called Lago Escondido.
