= Tolhuin Department =

- Department
- Coat of arms

- Location of Río Grande Department within Tierra del Fuego Province
- Coordinates: 53°47′11″S 67°41′48″W
- Country: Argentina
- Province: Tierra del Fuego
- Established: October 27, 2017
- Head town: Tolhuin

Area
  - Total: 11,243 km^{2} (4,341 sq mi)
- Time zone: UTC-3 (ART)

Tolhuin Department (Spanish: Departamento Tolhuin) is a department of Argentina in Tierra del Fuego Province, Argentina. Previously part of the Río Grande Department, it was established as a separate department on October 27, 2017, by law of the provincial legislature. Tolhuin is the capital city of the department.
