= Pampa Guanaco Airport =

Airport in Tierra del Fuego Province, Chile

- IATA: DPB; ICAO: SCBI

Summary
- Airport type: Public
- Serves: Camerón, Timaukel, Tierra del Fuego Province, Magallanes Region, Chile
- Elevation AMSL: 591 ft / 180 m
- Coordinates: 54°03′00″S 68°48′30″W

Map
- Location of Pampa Guanaco Airport in Chile

Runways
Direction	Length		Surface
Direction	m	ft	Surface
08/26	800	2,625	Asphalt
- Source: Landings.com Google Maps GCM

Pampa Guanaco Airport Spanish: Aeropuerto Pampa Guanaco (IATA: DPB, ICAO: SCBI) is a rural airport near Inútil Bay, serving Camerón in the Timaukel commune, part of the Tierra del Fuego province in the Magallanes Region of Chile.

There is a low ridge south and west of the runway.

== See also ==
- Transport in Chile
- List of airports in Chile
