= MV Melinka =

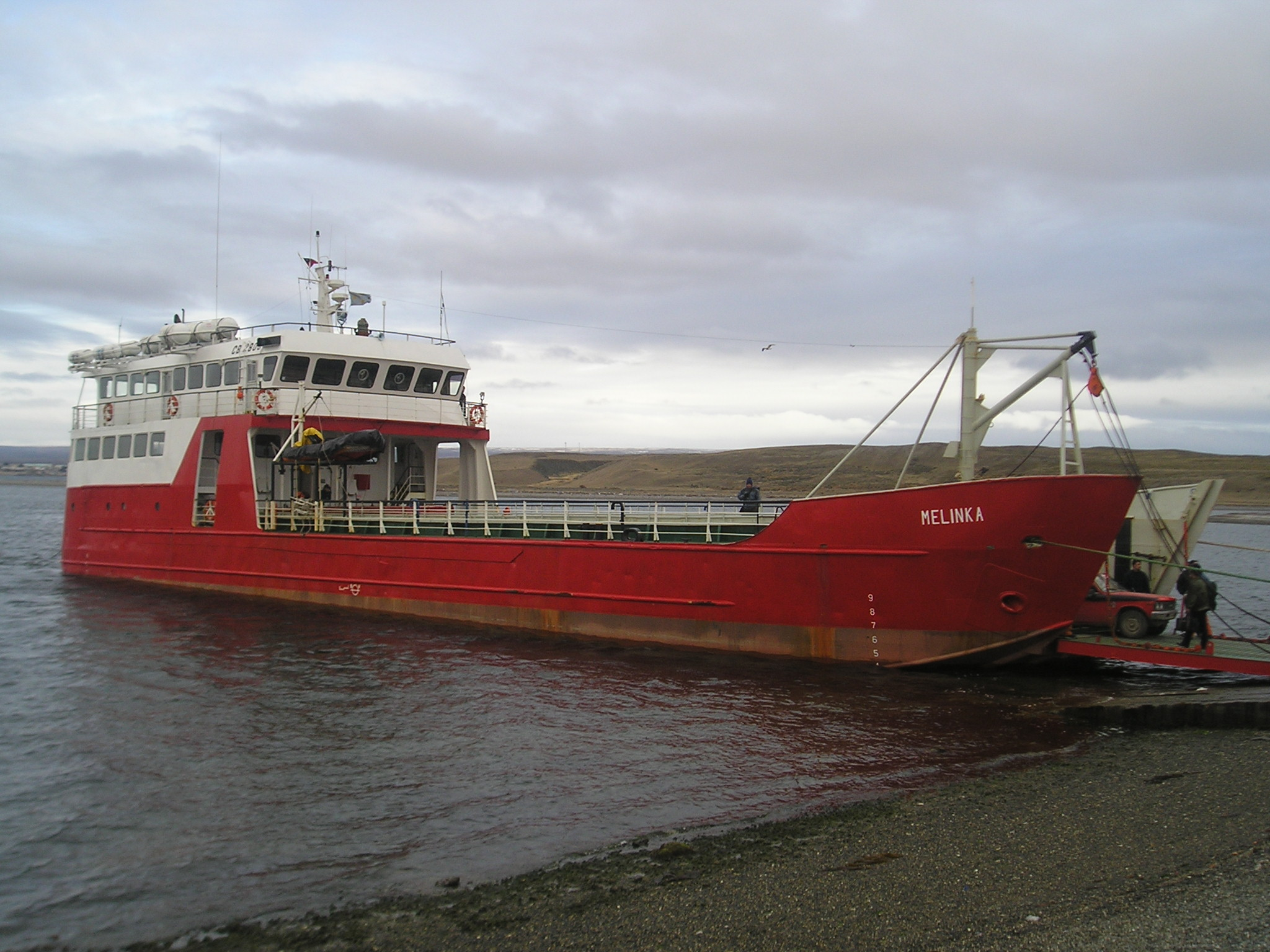
- Melinka at Porvenir, September 2006

History

Chile
- Name: Melinka
- Namesake: Melinka
- Owner: Transbordadora Austral Broom S.A.
- Builder: Tracor Marine, Port Everglades, Florida, USA
- Yard number: 128
- Launched: 1964
- Identification: IMO number: 6500832; Call sign: CB2808; MMSI number: 725000251
- Status: In service

General characteristics
- Type: Ro-Ro ferry
- Tonnage: 472 GRT; 244 NRT; 488 DWT
- Length: 40.5 m (132 ft 10 in)
- Beam: 10.02 m (32 ft 10 in)
- Depth: 3.6 m (11 ft 10 in)
- Propulsion: 2 diesel engines; 2 shafts
- Speed: 10.3 knots (19.1 km/h; 11.9 mph)
- Capacity: 230 passengers, 23 vehicles
- Crew: 22

M/V Melinka is a ferry (Spanish: Barcaza) owned by the Transbordadora Austral Broom S.A. shipping company in Tierra del Fuego, Chile.

The ship was built by Tracor Marine of Port Everglades, Florida, USA, and launched in 1964.

Until about 2009 Melinka provided a daily (or near-daily) transport service across the Strait of Magellan between Tres Puentes, near Punta Arenas and Bahía Chilote, near Porvenir. Since about 2009 other ferry ships have been used, and the Melinka has been used to transport vehicles, equipment, and passengers from the mainland to Isla Riesco. However, even as late a 2013 the Melinka has been used for its traditional route between Tres Puentes and Bahía Chilote.

Melinka can transport up to 230 passengers and has a deck for approximately 23 vehicles. It also has a coffee service for passengers.

== See also ==
- Pionero
