= Tierra del Fuego Province =

Tierra del Fuego Province may refer to:

- Tierra del Fuego Province, Argentina
- Tierra del Fuego Province, Chile
