= Transbordadora Austral Broom S.A. =

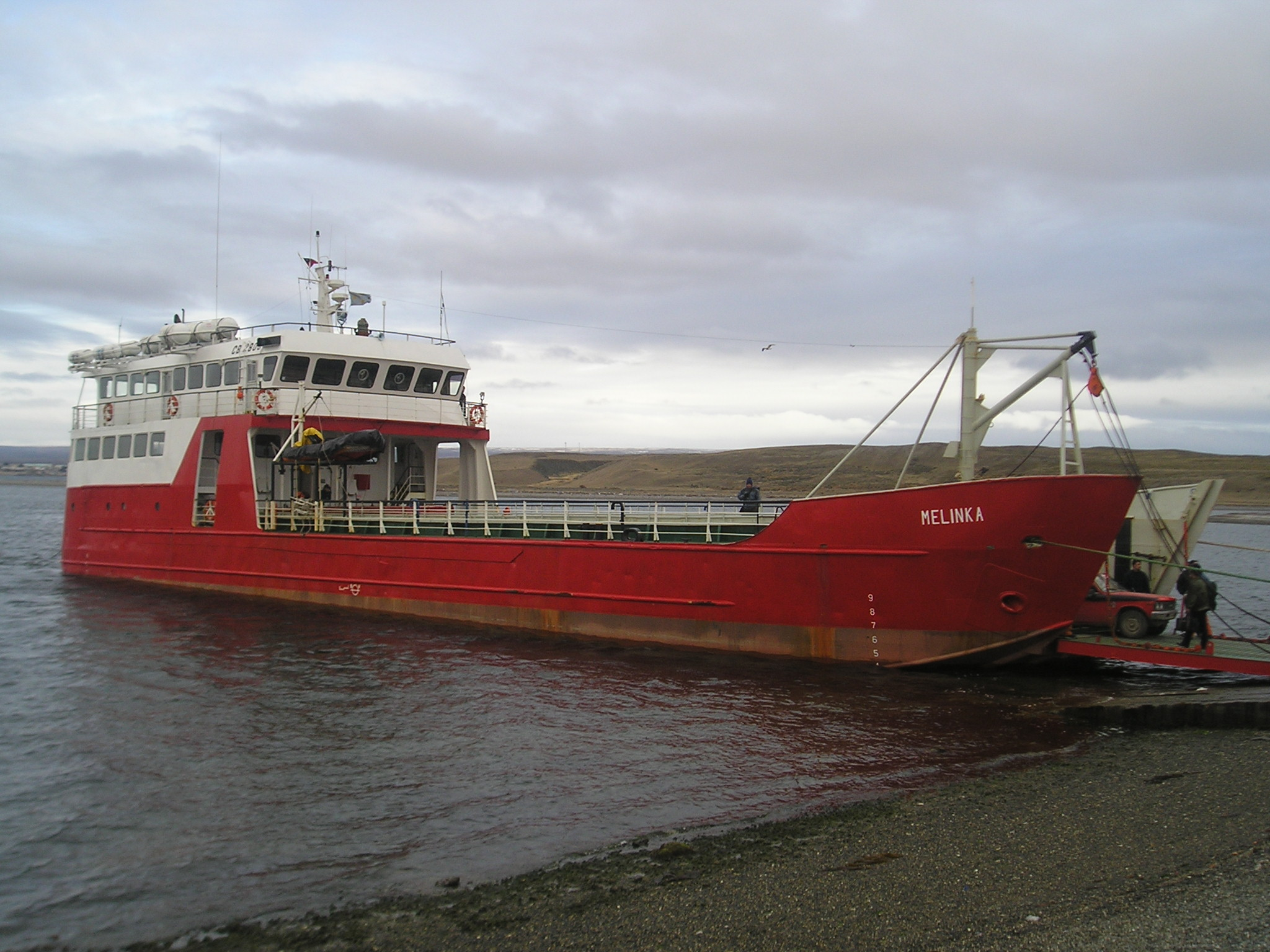
The Transbordadora Austral Broom S.A. owned Melinka ferry at Porvenir port

Transbordadora Austral Broom S.A is a Chilean water transportation company.

The company also owns and operates the Melinka ferry which services the Porvenir area.

== Crossing Service at Primera Angostura ==
Services between Patagonia and Tierra del Fuego have operated since 1968, via the eastern inlet of the Strait of Magellan. This is the narrowest part of the Strait between the islands and Primera Angostura.

At present, there are two ferries connecting Punta Delgada on the mainland and Bahía Azul in Tierra del Fuego. The Punta Delgada terminal is located 170 km north of Punta Arenas.

== Crossing Service at Porvenir ==
Since 1984, Transbordadora Austral Broom has had a daily crossing between the Tres Puentes terminal located 5 km north of Punta Arenas city center, and the Bahía Chilota terminal located 5 km from Porvenir. Porvenir is located in the west of Tierra del Fuego, and to the southeast of Punta Arenas. It is 20 miles from the continent and separated by the Strait of Magellan.

This service is provided by the landing craft Melinka which can transport 230 passengers and has a deck for approximately 23 vehicles. It also has coffee service for passengers.

The company also owns the Pionero ferry.

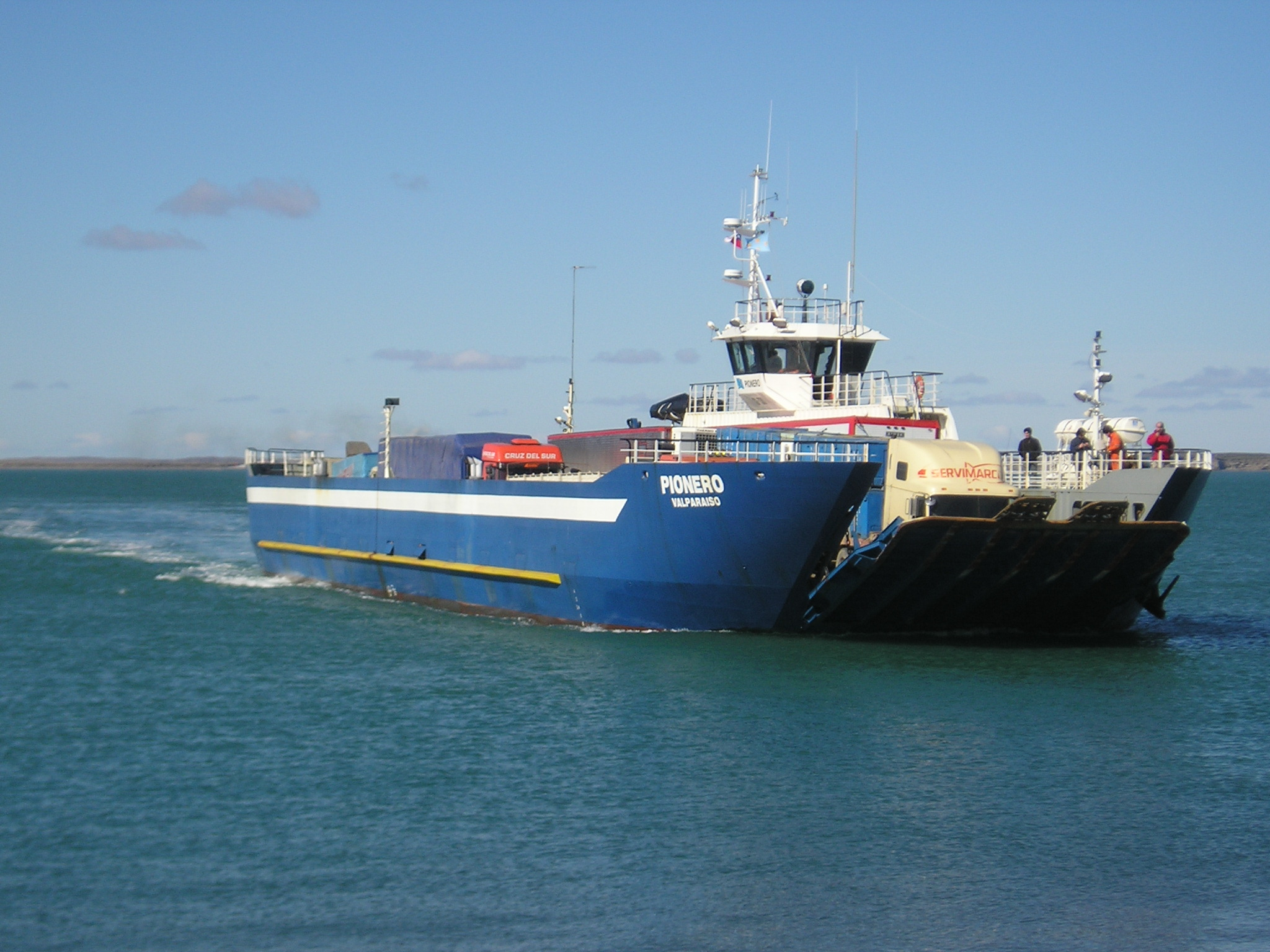
The Pionero approaching Punta Delgada ferry terminal in the Strait of Magellan

== Ferry to Puerto Williams ==
The company operates a weekly Roll-on/roll-off ferry from Punta Arenas to Puerto Williams on Navarino Island, a 30-hour journey. The service is operated by the Yaghan, built in 2011 by Asenav in Valdivia.
