= Penicillium lapatayae =

Scientific classification
- Kingdom: Fungi
- Division: Ascomycota
- Class: Eurotiomycetes
- Order: Eurotiales
- Family: Aspergillaceae
- Genus: Penicillium
- Species: P. lapatayae

Binomial name
- Penicillium lapatayae Ramírez, C. 1985

Type strain
- ATCC 60197, CBS 203.87, FRR 3308, IJFM 19012

Species of fungus

Penicillium lapatayae is an anamorph species of the genus of Penicillium which was isolated from Tierra del Fuego in Chile. Penicillium lapatayae produces (-)-lapatin B
