= Camerón =

Hamlet in Magallanes Region, Chile

Villa Cameron
- Interactive map of Villa Cameron
- Coordinates: 53°38′16″S 69°38′52″W
- Country: Chile
- Region: Magallanes
- Province: Tierra del Fuego
- Municipality: Timaukel
- Commune: Timaukel

Government
  - Mayor: Alfonso Simunovic

Population (2002 census )
  - Total: 62
- Time zone: UTC−04:00 (Chilean Standard)
  - Summer (DST): UTC−03:00 (Chilean Daylight)
- Area code: Country + town = 56 + ?
- Climate: Cfc

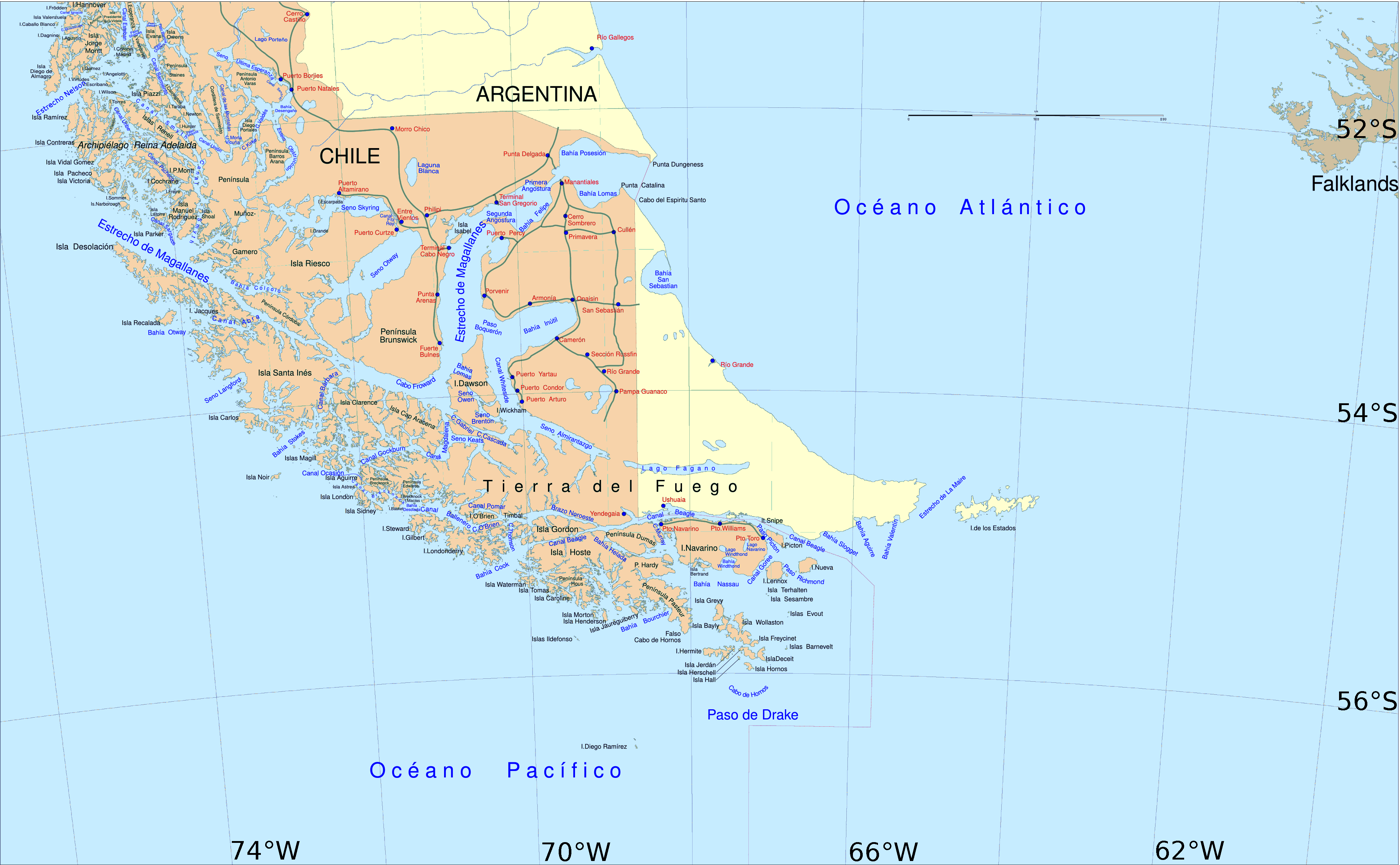
Location of Villa Cameron in the Magallanes Region.

Villa Cameron is a hamlet (Spanish: aldea) in southern Tierra del Fuego Island, and is the head of Timaukel commune, in Magallanes Region. Villa Cameron is located in the southern shore of Inútil Bay. The city is served by the Pampa Guanaco Airport (IATA: DPB, ICAO: SCBI).
