= Bahía Posesión =

Coordinates: 52.3000°S 68.9500°W

Site of the oil spill: south beach of the Primera Angostura in the Straits of Magellan

Bahía Posesión, also known in English as Possession Bay, is an ocean atlantic bay on the north shore of the Strait of Magellan located between Primera Angostura and Punta Dúngeness. It is approximately 37 km (23 mi) south of the Pali-Aike National Park, the location of some of the earliest known human settlement in the Americas, going as far back as the human occupation at the Pali-Aike crater lava tube 10,000 years ago.

In 1974, the oil tanker VLCC Metula, en route to Quintero Bay, Chile, ran aground here and lost some 60,000 tons of light Arabian crude before reflotation, severely affecting the local wildlife.

== See also ==
- Tierra del Fuego
