= Laguna de los Cisnes Natural Monument =

- IUCN category III (natural monument or feature)
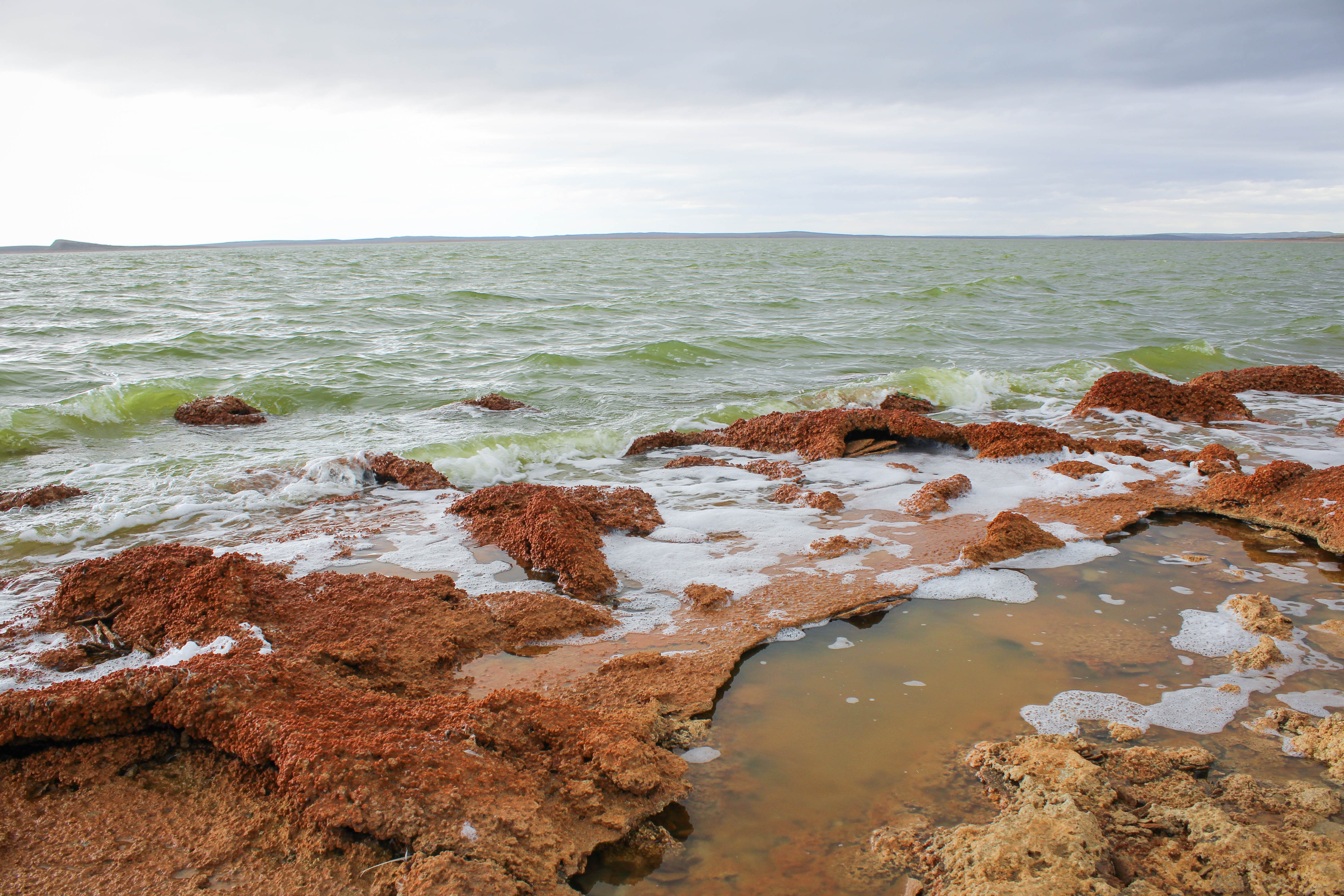
- Stromatolite park in the lagoon
- Interactive map of Laguna de los Cisnes Natural Monument
- Location: Magallanes Region, Chile
- Nearest city: Porvenir
- Coordinates: 53°15′00″S 70°22′00″W
- Area: 25 ha (62 acres)
- Established: 1982
- Governing body: Corporación Nacional Forestal (CONAF)

Monumento Natural Laguna de los Cisnes (Spanish for "Swan Lagoon Natural Monument") is a protected area in Chile located about 3.7 miles (6 km) north of the town of Porvenir, close to the Strait of Magellan. It encompasses the lake of the same name along with seven islets within it. The site also includes a stromatolite park, one of the few places in Chile and South America where these ancient microbial structures can be observed.

== Declaration ==
It was originally designated as a National Tourism Park by Decree No. 207 of 22 April 1982, issued by the Ministry of Agriculture. Later, on 13 October 1982, it was reclassified through Decree No. 160 of the same ministry, which revoked its national park status and established it as a Natural Monument.

== Flora and fauna ==
The flora of the reserve is minimal: the seven islets that compose the protected area are essentially devoid of vegetation. Meanwhile, the fauna is dominated by a rich avifauna, making the lagoon a vital sanctuary for birdlife. Among the species recorded are the black‑necked swan (Cygnus melancoryphus), the Coscoroba swan (Coscoroba coscoroba), the Chilean flamingo (Phoenicopterus chilensis), and various ducks, geese such as the Caiquén, and raptors like the Carancho (Polyborus plancus). As one of the few brackish lagoons in southern Patagonia — freshwater with notable saline characteristics — it also supports planktonic communities, including microalgae and brine shrimp, which in turn sustain waterbirds. The protected status of the area reflects its importance as a breeding, feeding and resting site for dozens of bird species, particularly during the austral spring and summer. Conservation measures prohibit disturbance to nesting sites, removal of biological material, and any activity that might harm the avifauna, underlining the lagoon's role as a refuge for wildlife diversity.
