= Porvenir, Chile =

Porvenir Karukinka
- Town and Commune
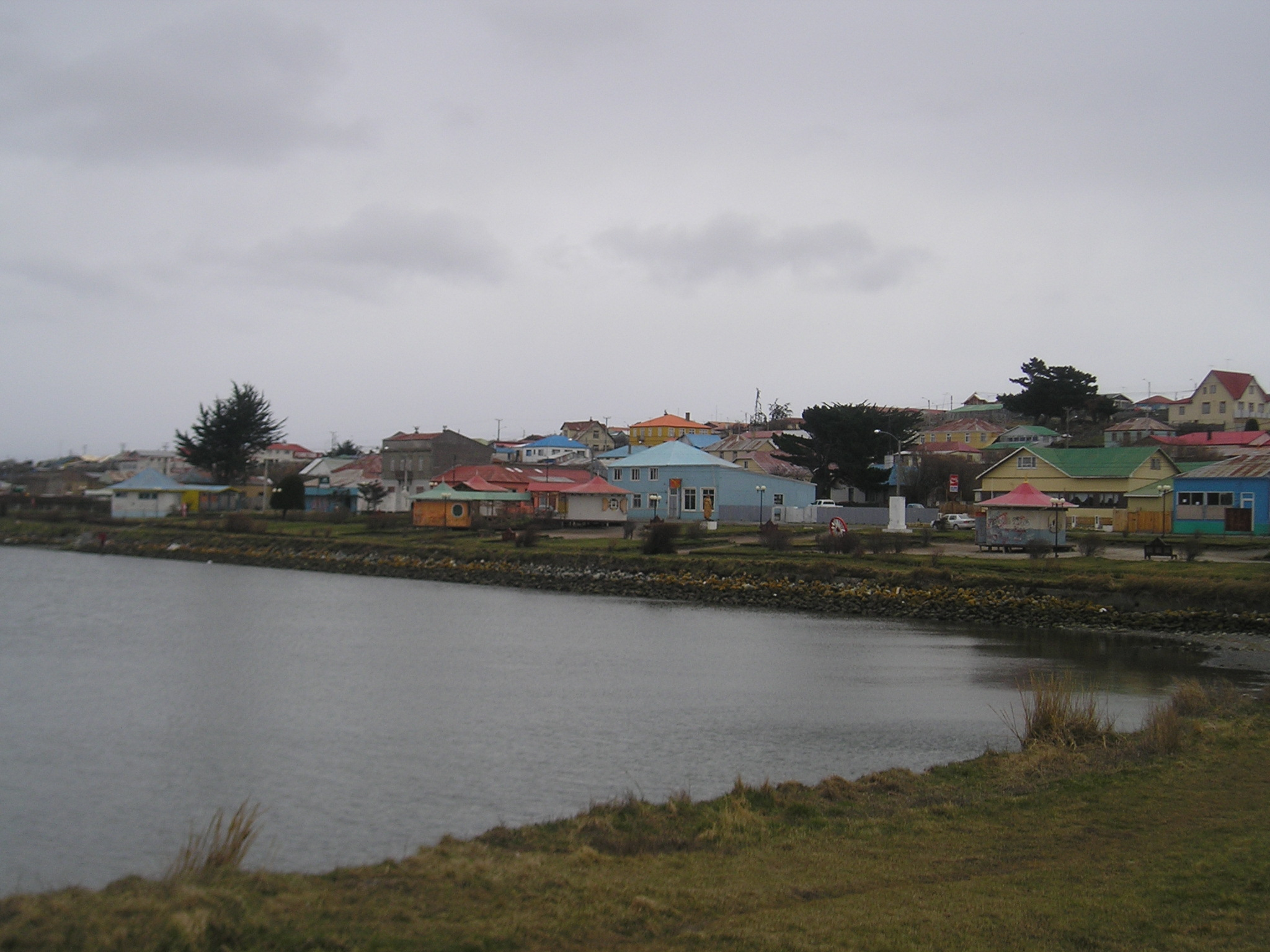
- A view of Porvenir

- Coat of arms Map of Porvenir commune in Magallanes and Antarctica Chilena Region Location in Chile
- Coordinates: 53°17′S 70°22′W
- Country: Chile
- Region: Magallanes y Antártica Chilena
- Province: Tierra del Fuego
- Founded: 1899

Government
  - Type: Municipality
  - Alcalde: Marisol Andrade Cárdenas (Christian Democratic Party)

Area
  - Total: 6,982.6 km^{2} (2,696.0 sq mi)
- Elevation: 17 m (56 ft)

Population (2012 Census)
  - Total: 5,907
  - Density: 0.8460/km^{2} (2.191/sq mi)
  - Urban: 4,734
  - Rural: 731
- Demonym(s): Porvenireño, -a

Sex
  - Men: 3,307
  - Women: 2,158
- Time zone: UTC−3 (CLST)
- Area code: 61
- Climate: Cfc
- Website: Official website (in Spanish)

Porvenir is the capital of both the homonymous commune and the Chilean Province of Tierra del Fuego of the Magallanes y la Antártica Chilena Region. It is one of Chile's southernmost towns, and has 4,734 inhabitants, including several thousand soldiers. It is the largest settlement in the Chilean half of Isla Grande de Tierra del Fuego.

Porvenir (Spanish for "hereafter" – literally "yet to come") was founded in 1883 by immigrants from Croatia and Chiloé in connection to the gold mining that preceded the larger Tierra del Fuego gold rush that started in 1884.

The main sources of income are sheep farming and small-scale fishing (wrecks in Porvenir bay prevent larger vessels from mooring). In addition there is a regiment of the Chilean army and a high-security prison. An abattoir operates for only short periods of the year.

Some gold deposits remain and are commercially mined. Porvenir also gives access to Cerro Sombrero, an oil town, 125 km (78 mi) north-east of Porvenir.

== Demographics ==
Historical population
Year	Pop.	±% p.a.
1930	1,793	—
1940	2,844	+4.72%
1952	2,654	−0.57%
1970	3,796	+2.01%
1982	7,219	+5.50%
1992	5,104	−3.41%
2002	5,465	+0.69%
2017	6,801	+1.47%
2024	6,809	+0.02%
Source: "Censo de Población y Vivienda". National Statistics Institute.

According to the 2002 census of the National Statistics Institute, Porvenir spans an area of 6,982.6 km^{2} (2,696 sq mi) and has 5,465 inhabitants (3,307 men and 2,158 women). Of these, 4,734 (86.6%) lived in urban areas and 731 (13.4%) in rural areas. The population grew by 7.1% (361 persons) between the 1992 and 2002 censuses.

== Administration ==
As a commune, Porvenir is a third-level administrative division of Chile administered by a municipal council, headed by an alcalde who is directly elected every four years. The 2016-2020 alcaldesa is Marisol Andrade Cárdenas .

Within the electoral divisions of Chile, Porvenir is represented in the Chamber of Deputies by Juan Morano (PDC) and Gabriel Boric (Ind.) as part of the 60th electoral district, which includes the entire Magallanes y la Antártica Chilena Region. The commune is represented in the Senate by Carlos Bianchi Chelech (Ind.) and Carolina Goic (PDC) as part of the 19th senatorial constituency (Magallanes y la Antártica Chilena Region).

== Tourism ==
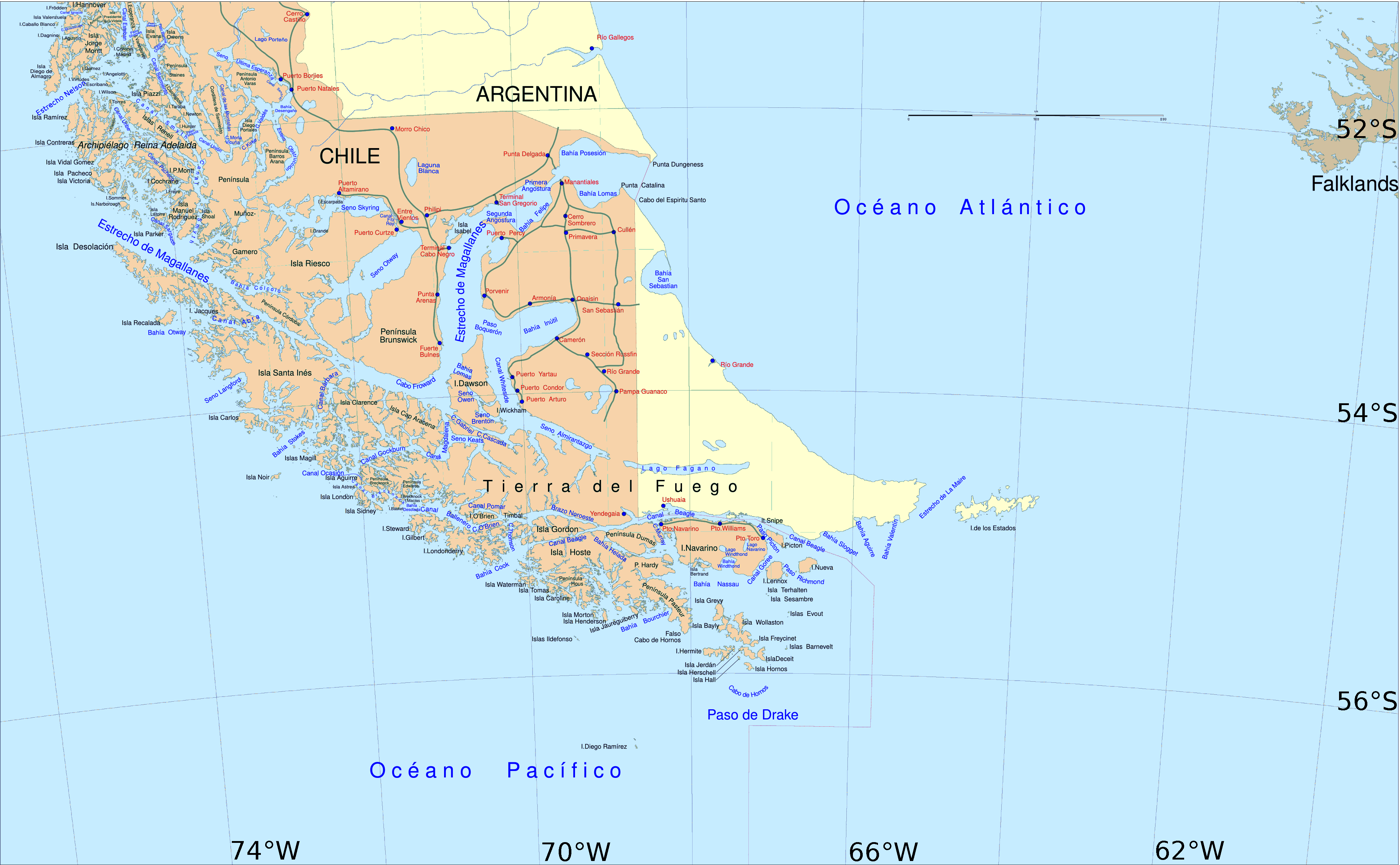
Porvenir in Tierra del Fuego

Though tourism is expanding, most tourists pass Porvenir by, or use it simply as a stopover on their way farther south. There are several hotels, cyber-cafes, restaurants, and one gas station. A small grocery store is located near the Chilean army base on the upper level of the town, and there are several small stores and supermarkets elsewhere in town.

Access is by ferry or by air from Punta Arenas or by road from the Argentine side of the island. All ferries across the Straits of Magellan are run by Austral Broom, a Chilean company. One service runs once daily except Mondays from the port near Punta Arenas and reaches the ferry terminal about 3 km from the town of Porvenir. The other service is at the northern end of the island running from Punta Delgada to Bahia Azul.

It is possible to reach the south of Chilean Tierra del Fuego from Porvenir. The southern region has several lakes and rivers available for fishing.

The Laguna de los Cisnes Natural Monument, located about 4 miles (6 km) north of Porvenir, was designated a protected area in 1982. The site includes a shallow brackish lagoon and a small group of islets that provide important habitat for aquatic birds. Visitors can observe species such as black-necked swans, Chilean flamingos, and various migratory shorebirds, making it one of the most notable wildlife-viewing areas near the city. The King Penguin Natural Reserve is a privately managed conservation area that allows visitors to observe a small, year-round colony of king penguins under controlled conditions. Tourism is regulated through designated viewing areas and limited visitor capacity to reduce disturbance to the birds. The site has become a regular stop on routes through Tierra del Fuego's natural attractions, offering opportunities for wildlife observation within a protected setting.

== Climate ==
The climate in Porvenir is a subpolar variety (Köppen: Cfc) of the oceanic climate. Temperatures in the warmest months, January and February average 10.7 °C (51.3 °F) while temperatures in the coolest month average 1.7 °C (35.1 °F). Precipitation is at around 749 millimetres (29.5 in). Also, due to its latitude, the length of the day varies tremendously across the year. Winter days can have as few as seven hours of sunlight, while summer days stretch to twenty hours. Frost occurs throughout the year, and winter temperatures can remain below freezing for relatively long periods of time. Freak snowfalls can occur even in midsummer. The highest temperature was 32.2 °C (90.0 °F) in February 2019.

Climate data for Porvenir (1991–2020, extremes 1986–present (Note: Please enter the value "530005" in the parameter "Estación"))
Month	Jan	Feb	Mar	Apr	May	Jun	Jul	Aug	Sep	Oct	Nov	Dec	Year
Record high °C (°F)	26.7 (80.1)	32.2 (90.0)	26.0 (78.8)	20.8 (69.4)	14.2 (57.6)	13.2 (55.8)	14.9 (58.8)	13.6 (56.5)	18.2 (64.8)	20.9 (69.6)	25.2 (77.4)	27.4 (81.3)	32.2 (90.0)
Mean daily maximum °C (°F)	16.5 (61.7)	15.8 (60.4)	15.4 (59.7)	12.4 (54.3)	8.9 (48.0)	6.3 (43.3)	5.7 (42.3)	7.1 (44.8)	10.4 (50.7)	12.9 (55.2)	14.1 (57.4)	16.0 (60.8)	11.8 (53.2)
Daily mean °C (°F)	10.8 (51.4)	10.6 (51.1)	9.1 (48.4)	6.8 (44.2)	4.2 (39.6)	2.1 (35.8)	1.7 (35.1)	2.9 (37.2)	4.7 (40.5)	6.7 (44.1)	8.6 (47.5)	10.1 (50.2)	6.5 (43.8)
Mean daily minimum °C (°F)	4.8 (40.6)	5.3 (41.5)	4.0 (39.2)	2.1 (35.8)	0.1 (32.2)	−1.3 (29.7)	−1.9 (28.6)	−1.0 (30.2)	−0.5 (31.1)	0.9 (33.6)	3.3 (37.9)	4.5 (40.1)	1.7 (35.0)
Record low °C (°F)	−2.0 (28.4)	−2.2 (28.0)	−4.4 (24.1)	−5.8 (21.6)	−10.0 (14.0)	−10.2 (13.6)	−15.7 (3.7)	−10.8 (12.6)	−7.0 (19.4)	−4.8 (23.4)	−2.9 (26.8)	−3.0 (26.6)	−15.7 (3.7)
Average precipitation mm (inches)	86 (3.4)	65 (2.6)	74 (2.9)	74 (2.9)	54 (2.1)	47 (1.9)	46 (1.8)	49 (1.9)	48 (1.9)	56 (2.2)	69 (2.7)	81 (3.2)	749 (29.5)
Average precipitation days	15	12	12	11	9	8	9	9	10	11	13	15	134
Average relative humidity (%)	70	71	73	77	80	82	82	79	76	71	69	69	75
Mean daily sunshine hours	8.4	7.8	6.6	5.5	4.8	4.4	4.6	5.6	6.3	7.6	8.4	8.7	6.6
Source 1: Climate-Data.org
Source 2: Dirección Meteorológica de Chile (normal temperatures and extremes)

== Gallery ==
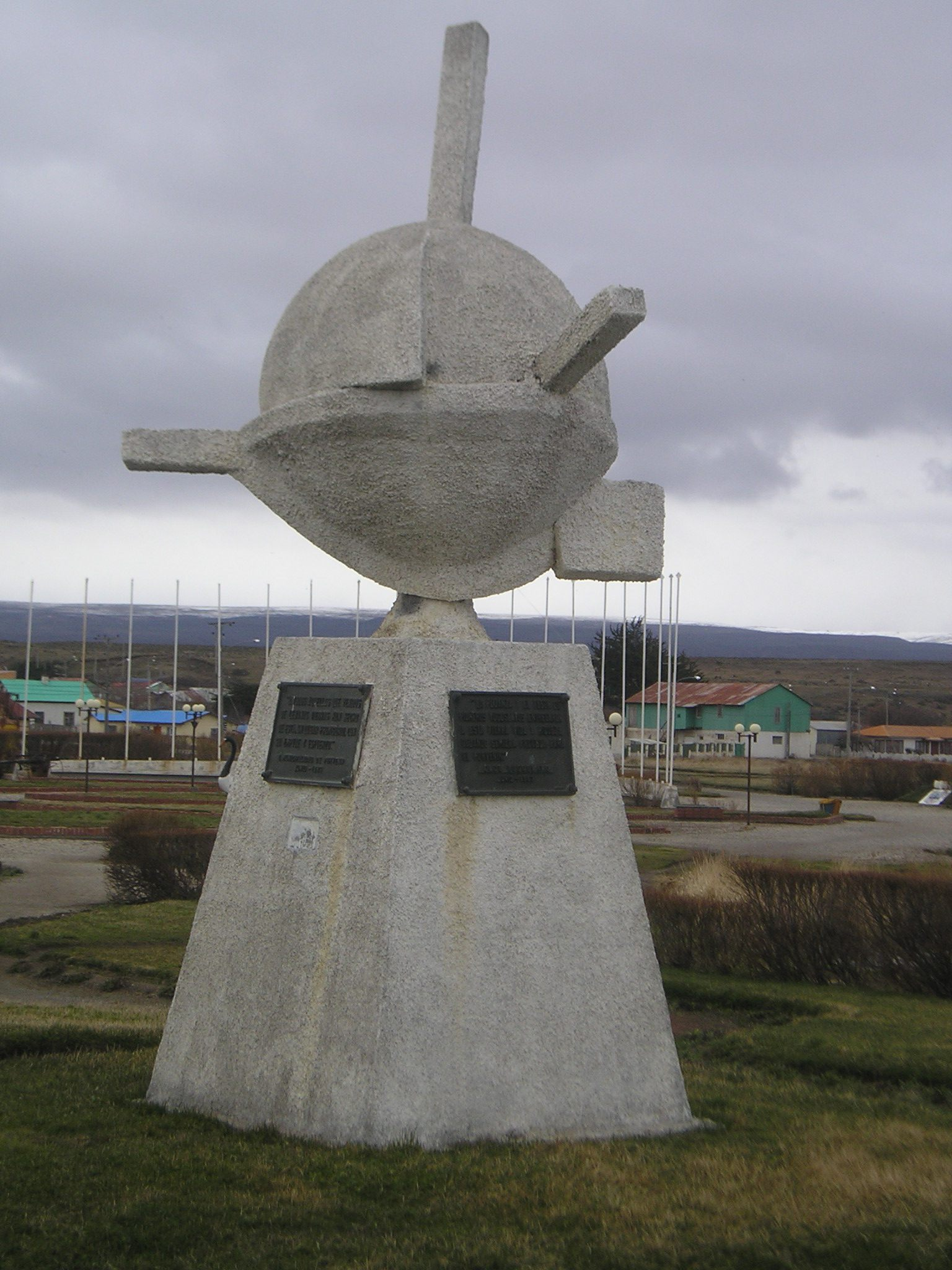
Monumento a los Inmigrantes.

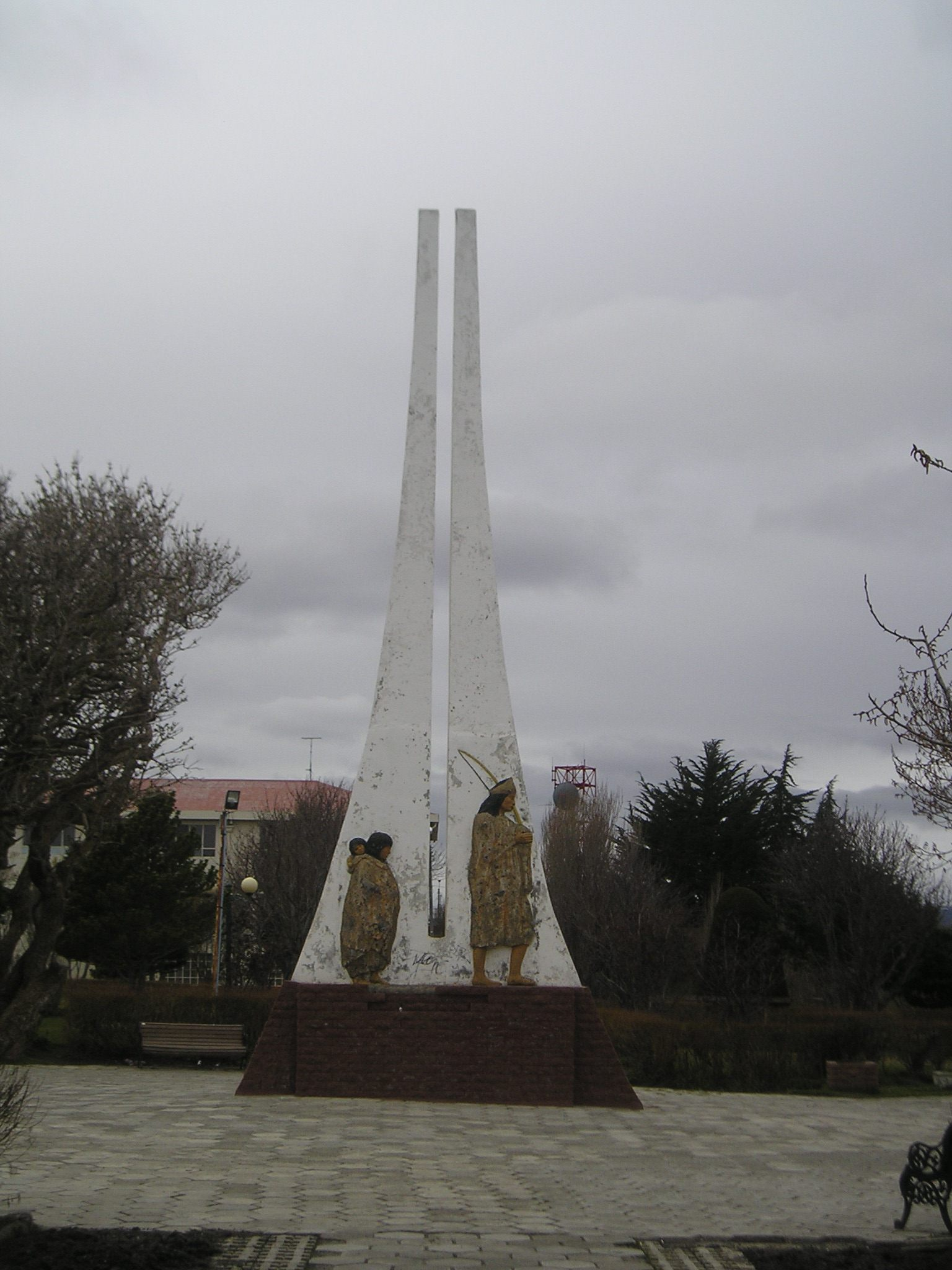
Monumento en la Plaza de Armas.

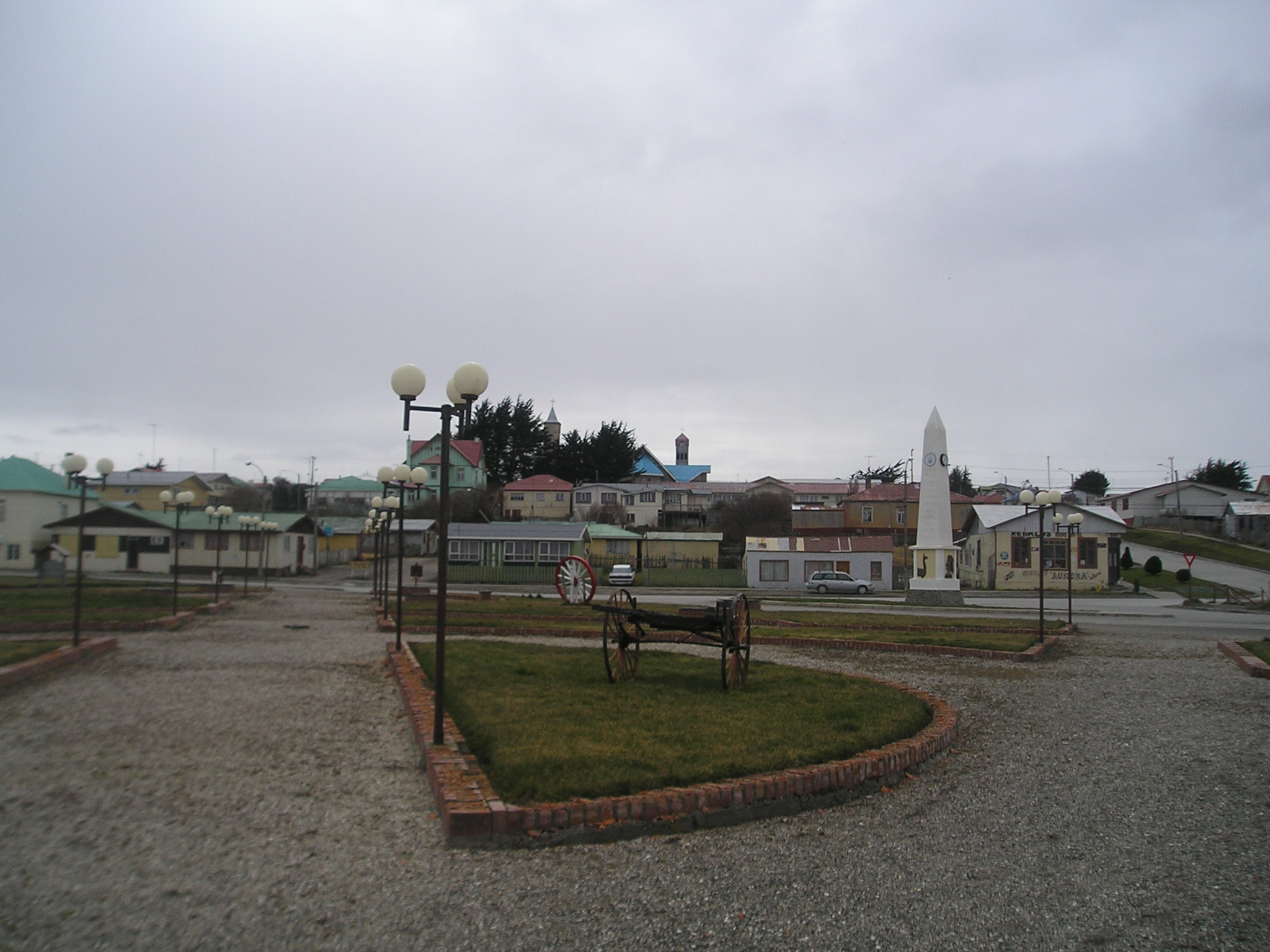
Parque Croata.

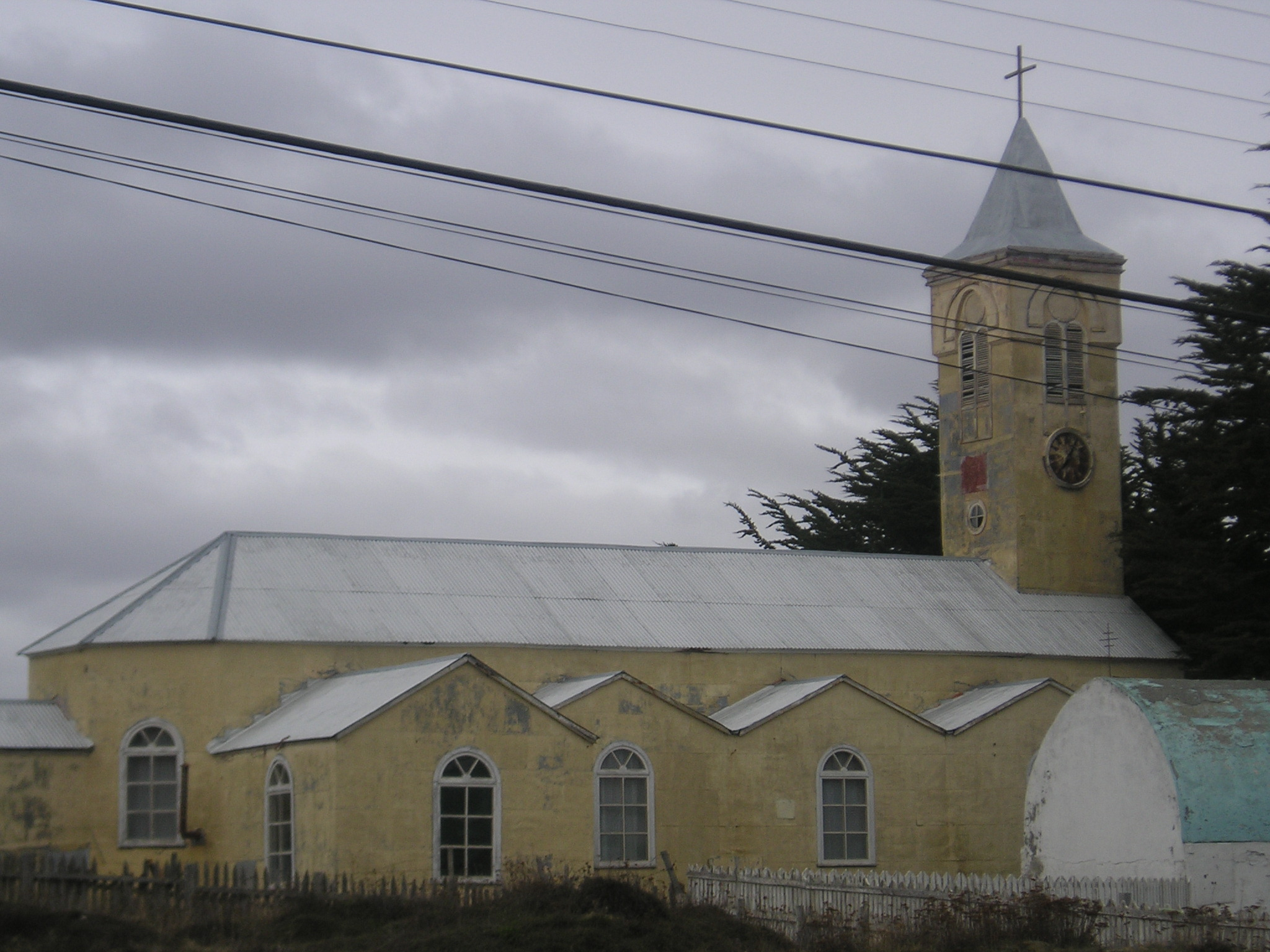
San Francisco De Sales Church

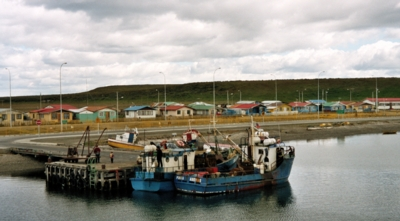
Porvenir
