= Primera Angostura =

Sound of the Strait of Magellan

Coordinates: 52°28′26″S 69°32′02″W

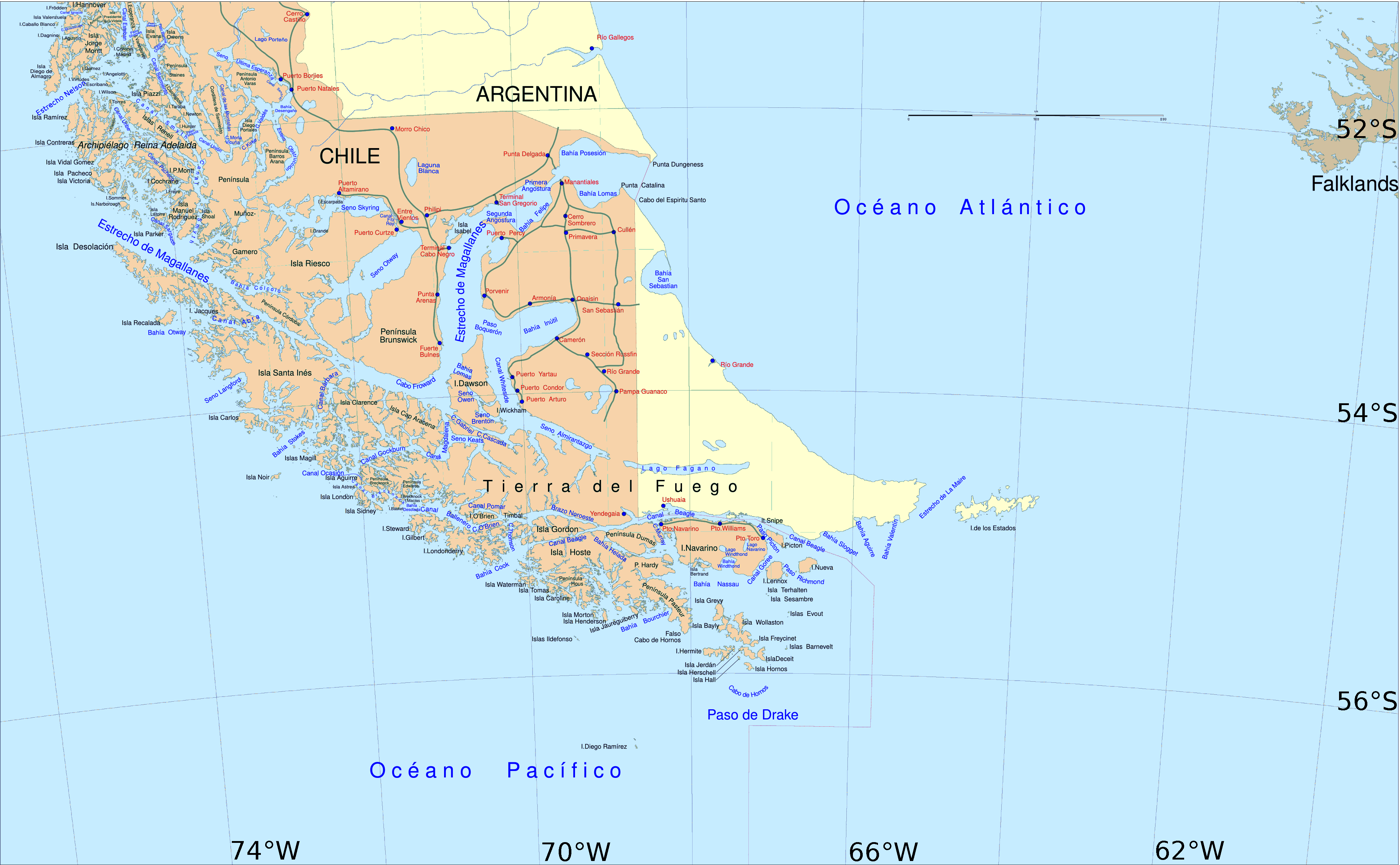
Primera angostura, west of Bahia Possession, at the east side of the Magellan straits

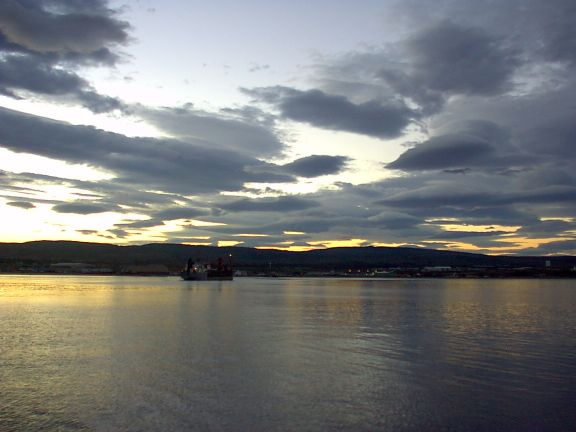
The Strait of Magellan at sunset

Primera Angostura is a sound of the Strait of Magellan in the Chilean region of Magallanes. It is located near Punta Delgada.

It lies between the commune of San Gregorio, in Magallanes Province, to the north, and the commune of Primavera, in Tierra del Fuego Province, to the south. It is the narrowest part of the Strait between the continent and the island of Tierra del Fuego.

The sound was named Primera Angostura (Spanish for First Narrows) as it was the first narrows of the strait that ships met when sailing through the strait from east to west.

The ferry company Transbordadora Austral Broom S.A. operates across the narrows.

During the White Earthquake in August 1995 the ferry service across Primera Angostura was suspended. The international road to Río Gallegos was also closed in the events.

== See also ==
- Bahía Posesión
- Segunda Angostura
- Spanish colonization attempt of the Strait of Magellan
