= Pionero =

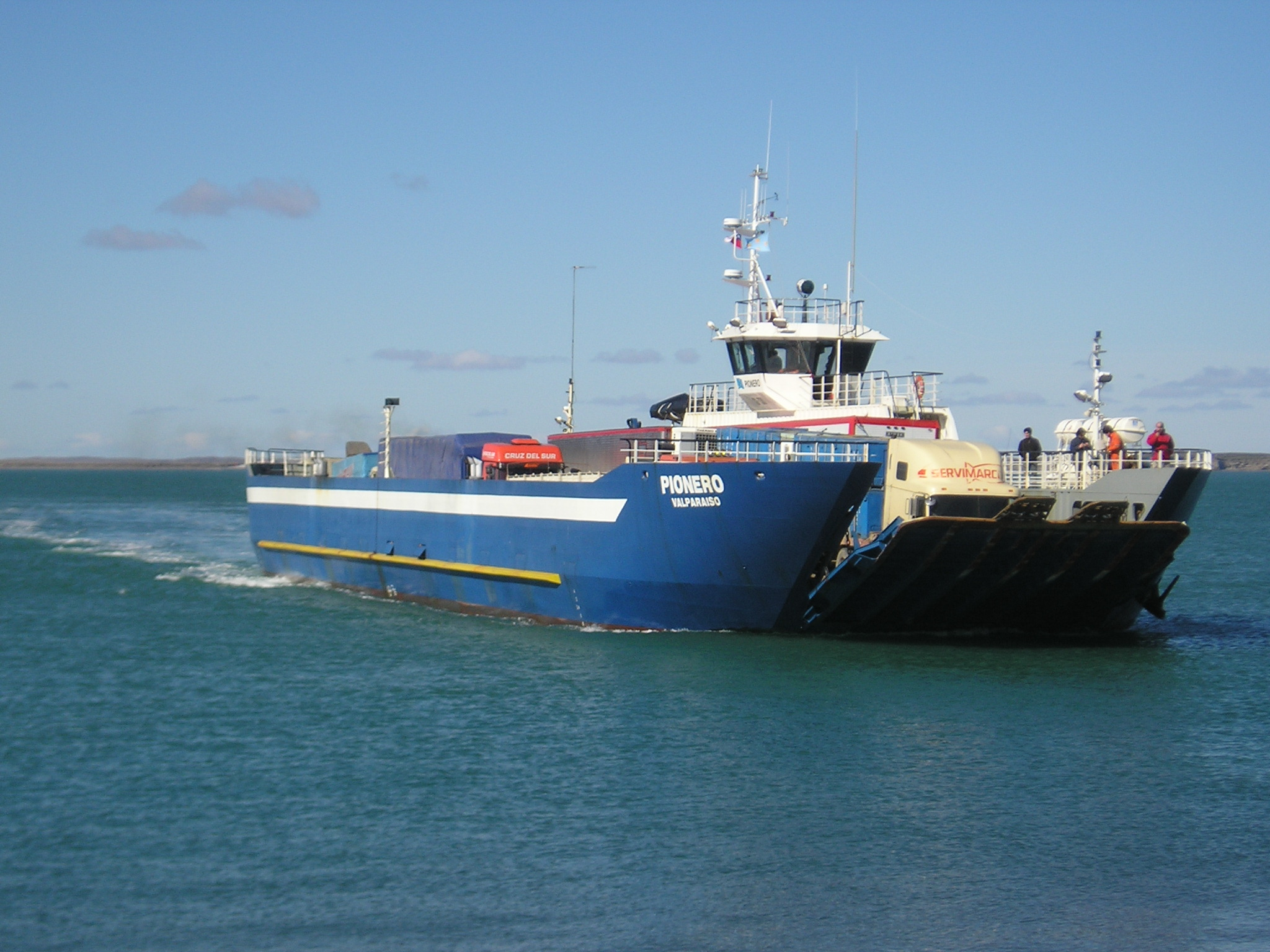
Approaching the Punta Delgada ferry terminal

The Pionero is a Roll-on/roll-off ferry operating in Tierra Del Fuego owned and run by the Chilean firm Transbordadora Austral Broom S.A. It serves the Strait of Magellan between Punta Delgada and Punta Espora across the Primera Angostura. It has a capacity of 200 passengers and is 77 meters long.

Pionero was launched on November 2, 2015.
