= Segunda Angostura =

Sound Of The Strait of Magellan

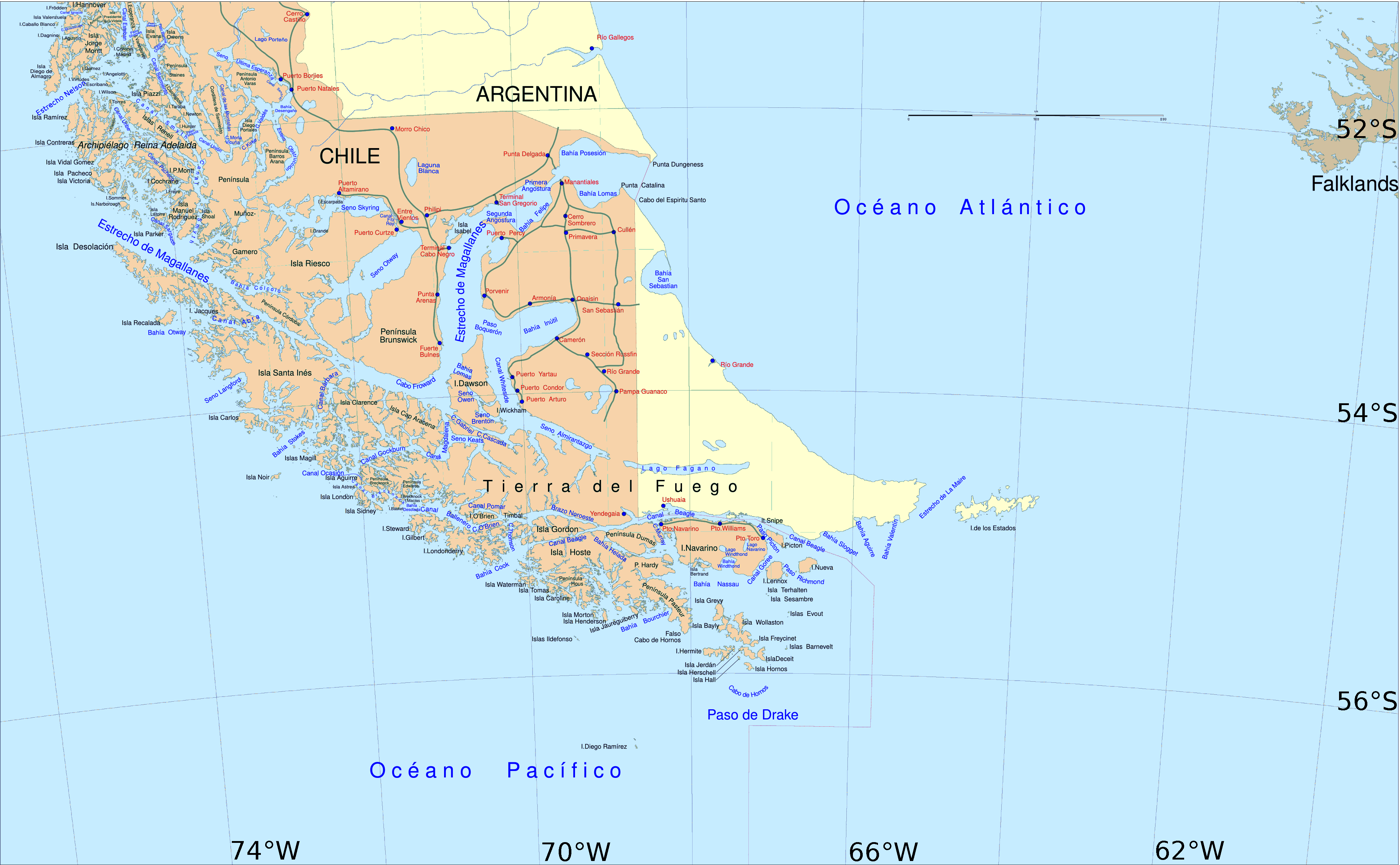
Segunda Angostura, south and west of Primera Angostura, at the east side of the Magellan straits

Segunda Angostura is a sound of the Strait of Magellan between the Patagonian mainland and Tierra del Fuego. It is located southwest of Primera Angostura, the narrowest part of the Strait between the island and the continent. The sound was named Segunda Angostura (Spanish for Second Narrows) as it was the second narrows of the strait that ships met when sailing through the strait from east to west.

Magdalena, Marta and Isabel Islands, North-East of Punta Arenas

== See also ==
- Primera Angostura
