= Cerro Sombrero =

Coordinates: 52°46′26″S 69°17′16″W

- village
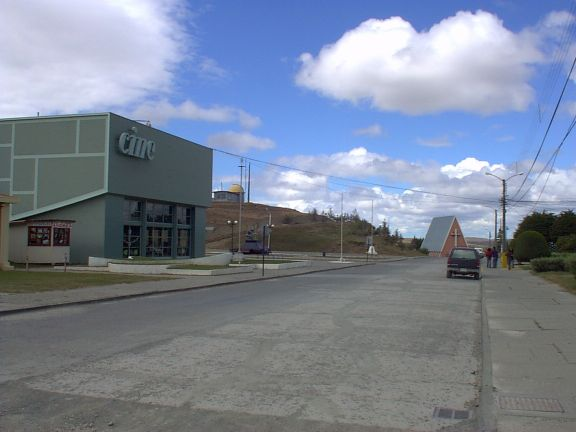
- Street in Cerro Sombrero
- Interactive map of Cerro Sombrero
- Region: Magallanes
- Province: Tierra del Fuego
- Municipalidad: Primavera
- Comuna: Primavera

Government
  - Type: Municipalidad
  - Alcalde: Blagomir Brztilo Avendaño

Population (2002 census )
  - Total: 687
- Time zone: UTC−04:00 (Chilean Standard)
  - Summer (DST): UTC−03:00 (Chilean Daylight)
- Area code: Country + town = 56 + ?
- Climate: Cfc

Cerro Sombrero (Spanish for "Hat Hill") is a village (Spanish: aldea) in southern Chile. It is located in the Primavera commune in the Magallanes Region, in the northern part of Tierra del Fuego, about 125 km from Porvenir. According to the 2002 census, it had 687 inhabitants.

The village is located near a small hill from which it received its name. It was founded in 1958 as a residential and services centre for the national Petroleum Company (ENAP) in Tierra del Fuego, with over 150 dwellings, a gym, swimming pool, bowling alley, botanical garden, movie theatre, church, hospital, warehouses, supermarket, restaurant, lodgings and gas station, in addition to the ENAP offices. This settlement is a natural entry point to the Chilean-Argentine Tierra del Fuego area. Nearby is Bahía Lomas, a place of biotic importance within the region with nesting places for a wide variety of shorebird species, both resident and migratory. Nearby Río del Oro, in the middle of the Tierra del Fuego steppe, is a popular fishing area for a variety of trout.

The town is served by Franco Bianco Airport.

== Weather ==
Cerro Sombrero has the typical "cold steppe climate" of Patagonia with low annual rainfall, fluctuating between a minimum of 250 mm, increasingly slightly near the south west coast (Felipe Bay), and reaching 400 mm on the east coast, near the Atlantic.

== Flora and fauna ==
Numerous species of birds can be observed in the area, including two kinds of sheldgoose, the cauquén colorado (ruddy-headed goose) and piuquén (also known as the ganso cordillerano or Andean goose), the pato juarjual, a kind of crested duck, the Chilean pintail, the coscoroba swan, the black-necked swan, and the Chilean flamingo. Migratory species also nest in the area, including the bandurria (black-faced ibis) and the queltehue (southern lapwing). Some come only in the summer, including the chorlo (rufous-chested plover), the playero (dunlin) and the falaropo picofino (red-necked phalarope).

The region has no woodland and is dominated by plains of native flora, typical of the Patagonian steppe. It predominantly consists of coarse grasses that grow in dense patches, perennial shrubs with deep roots and foliage resistant to the weather conditions and drought, and a variety of perennial herbaceous plants, often with small, thin, wavy-edged or tooth-edged leaves. The main species are Coirón (Festuca gracillima), Poaceaeas, Romerillo (Lomatia ferruginea), two kinds of Patagonian berries, Calafate (Berberis microphylla) and Murtilla (Ugni molinae), Vegas, coastal scrub, some species of Limonium and marshes.
