= Franco Bianco Airport =

Airport in Chile

- IATA: SMB; ICAO: SCSB

Summary
- Airport type: Private
- Serves: Cerro Sombrero, Chile
- Elevation AMSL: 106 ft (32 m)
- Coordinates: 52°44′12″S 69°20′05″W

Map
- Location of Franco Bianco Airport in Chile

Runways
Direction	Length		Surface
Direction	m	ft	Surface
07/25	1,545	5,069	Grass
01/19	1,150	3,773	Grass
- Source: Landings.com Google Maps GCM

Franco Bianco Airport (IATA: SMB, ICAO: SCSB) is an airport 5 kilometres (3.1 mi) northwest of Cerro Sombrero, a petroleum production town in the Magallanes Region of Chile. Cerro Sombrero is near the eastern entrance to the Strait of Magellan.

The Cerro Sombrero non-directional beacon (Ident: SOM) is 0.85 nautical miles (1.6 km) west of the approach threshold of Runway 07.

== See also ==
- Transport in Chile
- List of airports in Chile
