= 1949 Tierra del Fuego earthquakes =

Chilean natural disasters

- Location within Argentina
- UTC time: Doublet earthquake:
- A: 1949-12-17 06:53:32
- B: 1949-12-17 15:07:57
- ISC event
- A: 897093
- B: 897095
- USGS-ANSS
- A: ComCat
- B: ComCat
- Local date: December 17, 1949
- Local time
- A: 03:53 (UTC−03:00)
- B: 12:07 (UTC−03:00)
- Magnitude: Doublet earthquake:
- A: 7.7 M_{w}^{(ISC-GEM)}
- B: 7.6 M_{w}^{(OSC-GEM)}
- Epicenter: 53.97°S 69.56°W
- Max. intensity: MMI VIII (Severe)

The 1949 Tierra del Fuego earthquakes occurred slightly more than eight hours apart on 17 December. Their epicenters were located in the east of the Chilean Tierra del Fuego Province, close to the Argentine border on the island of Tierra del Fuego.

The two shocks measured 7.7 and 7.6 on the moment magnitude scale and were the most powerful ever recorded in the south of Argentina and one of the most powerful in austral Chile. They were felt with intensities as high as VIII (Severe) on the Mercalli intensity scale, and affected the settlements of Punta Arenas and Río Gallegos.

== See also ==
- List of earthquakes in 1949
- List of earthquakes in Chile
- List of earthquakes in Argentina
