= Isla Grande de Tierra del Fuego =

Island of Argentina and Chile

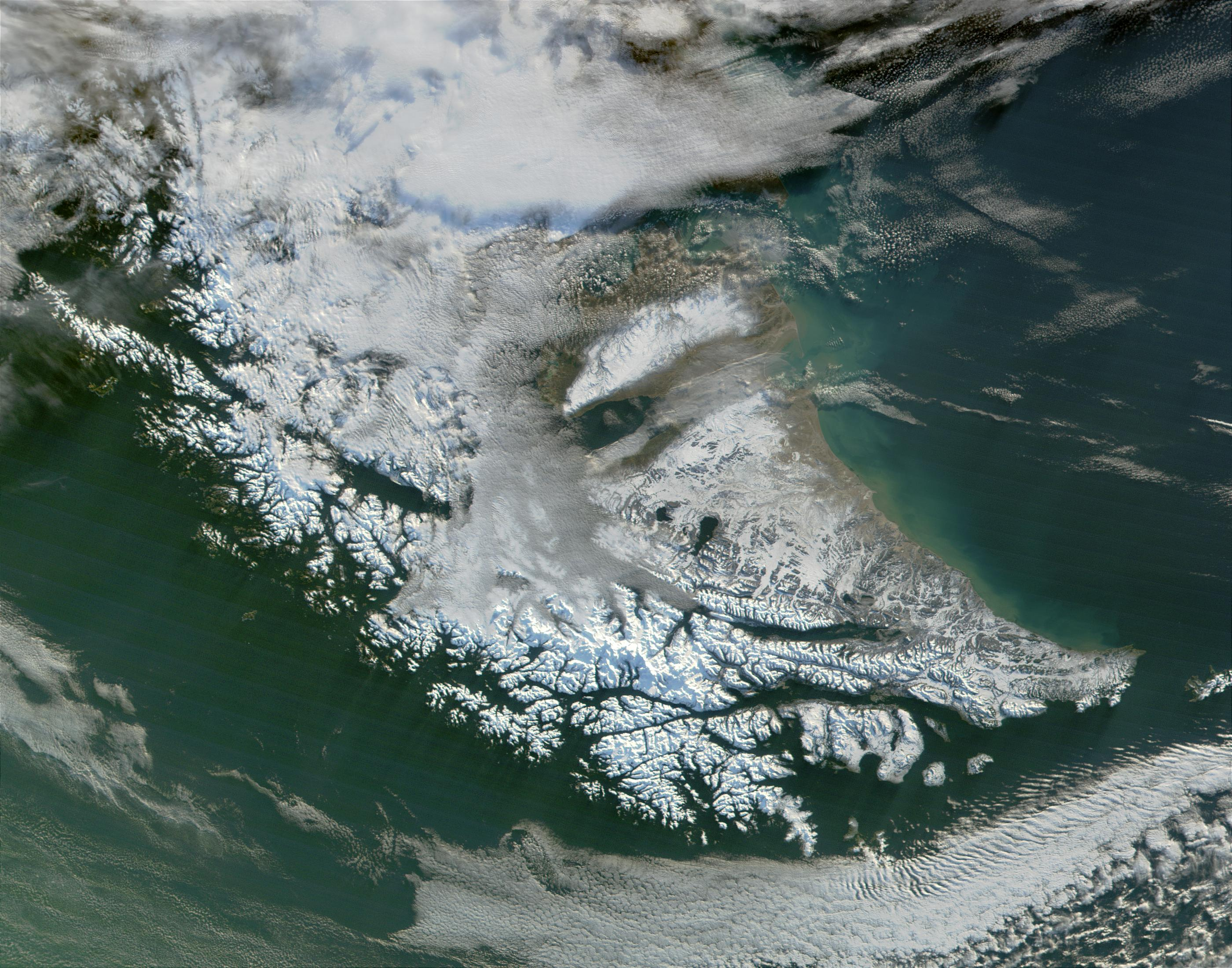
- Satellite image of Tierra del Fuego Island in autumn by NASA

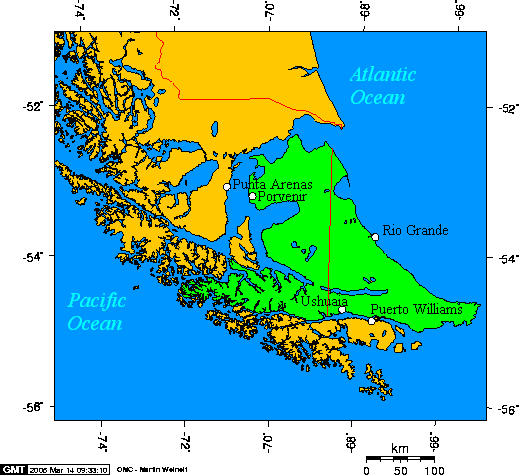
- Map of Isla Grande (lime green)

Geography
- Location: Tierra del Fuego
- Coordinates: 54°S 69°W
- Archipelago: Tierra del Fuego
- Area: 47,992 km^{2} (18,530 sq mi)
- Area rank: 29th
- Highest elevation: 2,580 m (8460 ft)
- Highest point: Monte Shipton

Administration
- Argentina
- Province: Tierra del Fuego
- Largest settlement: Río Grande (pop. 98,017)
- Chile
- Region: Magallanes Region
- Largest settlement: Porvenir (pop. 4,807)

Demographics
- Population: 172,797 (2016)
- Population rank: 151st
- Pop. density: 3.6/km^{2} (9.3/sq mi)
- Languages: Spanish (Chilean, Rioplatense); Selkʼnam (revived)
- Ethnic groups: White Chileans (Croatians, Irish); White Argentines; Afro-Argentines; Selkʼnam

Additional information
- Time zone: Argentina Time/Magallanes and Chilean Antarctica Time (UTC–3)

Isla Grande de Tierra del Fuego (Spanish for 'Great Island of Land of Fire'), also formerly called Isla de Xátiva, is an island near the southern tip of South America from which it is separated by the Strait of Magellan. The western portion (61.43%) of the island (27,294 km^{2} (10,538.3 sq mi)) is in Chile (Province of Tierra del Fuego and Antártica Chilena Province), while the eastern portion (38.57%, or 20,698 km^{2} (7,991.5 sq mi)) is in Argentina (Tierra del Fuego Province). It forms the major landmass in an extended archipelago (island group) also called Tierra del Fuego.

The island has an area of 47,992 km^{2} (18,530 sq mi), making it the largest island in South America and the 29th largest island in the world. Its two biggest towns are Ushuaia and Río Grande, both in Argentina. Other towns are Tolhuin, Porvenir, Camerón, and Cerro Sombrero. The Argentine side, Tierra del Fuego Province, has 190,641 inhabitants (2022), whereas the Chilean side has only 6,656 (2012), almost all located in the Tierra del Fuego Province.

Its highest point is unofficially named Monte Shipton (2,580 m (8,465 ft)), in Chile. Nearby Mount Darwin was previously thought to be the tallest mountain on the island, but is just less than a hundred metres shorter. The northern parts of the island have oil deposits; Cerro Sombrero in Chile is the main extraction centre in the island.

On 17 December 1949, an earthquake occurred in the Chilean portion, near the Argentine border. Recorded as 7.8 on the moment magnitude scale, it was the most powerful ever recorded in the south of Argentina.

== Geography ==
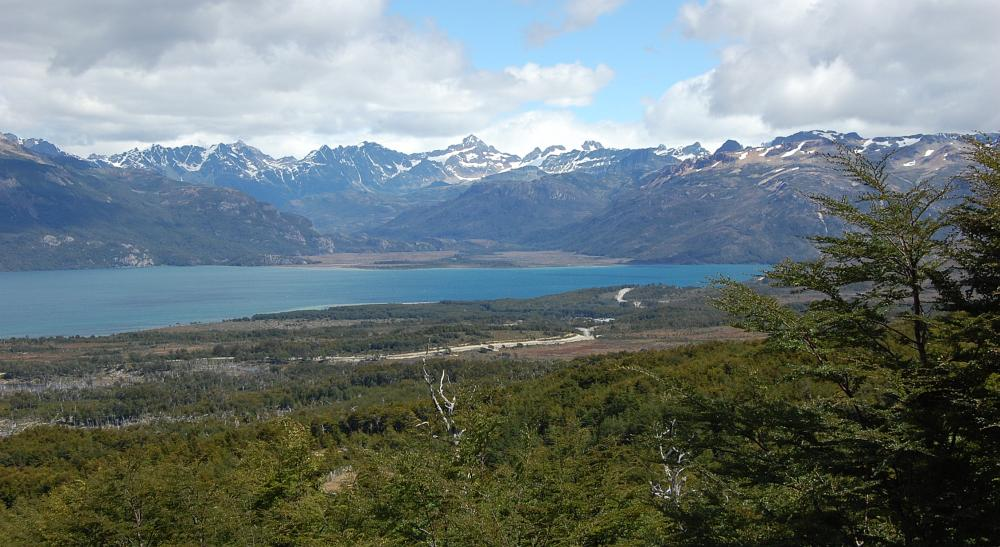
View of Fagnano Lake in Tierra del Fuego Island.

Tierra del Fuego is bounded on the east by the South Atlantic, on the north by the Magellan Straits and on the south and west by a series of fjords and channels linked to the Pacific Ocean. One of the few prominent features of the northeast shore is San Sebastián Bay. To the south the island is bounded by the Beagle Channel, south of which lie a series of islands included in Chilean territory. To the west the island has two major inlets, Inútil Bay and Almirantazgo Fjord. The latter lies along the Magallanes–Fagnano Fault and is a continuation of the Cami Lake depression in southern Tierra del Fuego.

The southwest part of the island, between the Almirantazgo Fjord and the Beagle Channel and extending west to end at Brecknock Peninsula on the Pacific Ocean, is mountainous with a heavily indented coastline, dominated by the Cordillera Darwin. Most of this part of the island is included in the Alberto de Agostini National Park of Chile.

== History ==
The earliest human settlement occurred more than 10,000 years ago, as people migrated from the mainland, perhaps under pressure from competitors. The Yaghan people were some of the earliest known humans settling in Tierra del Fuego. Certain archeological sites at locations such as Navarino Island, within the islands of Tierra del Fuego, have yielded artifacts and evidence of their culture from the Megalithic era.

The name Tierra del Fuego derives from Portuguese explorer Ferdinand Magellan, who was the first European to visit these lands in 1520, on his voyage to the Philippines from Spain. He believed he was seeing the many fires (fuego in Spanish) of the Amerindians, which were visible from the sea and that the "Indians" were waiting in the forests to ambush his armada. These were fires lit by the Yaghan who live in the northern part of the island, to ward off the low temperatures in the area. Originally called the "Land of Smoke", it was later changed to the more exciting "Land of Fire". (Note: There is no direct evidence that the name Tierra del Fuego was given to the island by Magellan himself or his companions, nor by King Charles I of Spain. In its modern form, the name appeared on maps only in the middle of the 16th century.)

The British commander Robert Fitzroy, on his first voyage aboard HMS Beagle in 1830, captured four native Fuegians after they stole a boat from his ship. The men included Orundellico, later named Jemmy Button by his crew. Fitzroy taught them English and took them with him on his return to England, where he took them to Court to meet the King and Queen in London. They became early celebrities. The surviving three were returned to Tierra del Fuego on the second voyage of Beagle, which included the naturalist Charles Darwin, who made extensive notes about his visit to the islands.

In July 1881 the island was divided between Argentina and Chile, each having previously claimed it entirely during the East Patagonia, Tierra del Fuego and Strait of Magellan Dispute.

The 1949 Tierra del Fuego earthquake took place on 17 December 1949, at 06:53:30. It recorded magnitude 7.8 in the Richter scale. Its epicenter was located in the east of the Chilean Tierra del Fuego Province, close to the Argentine border, at a depth of 30 km (19 mi). This was the most powerful earthquake ever recorded in the south of Argentina. It was felt with grade VIII in the Mercalli intensity scale, and affected the settlements and some others like Punta Arenas and Río Gallegos. Due to low population density, damage was limited.

== Climate ==
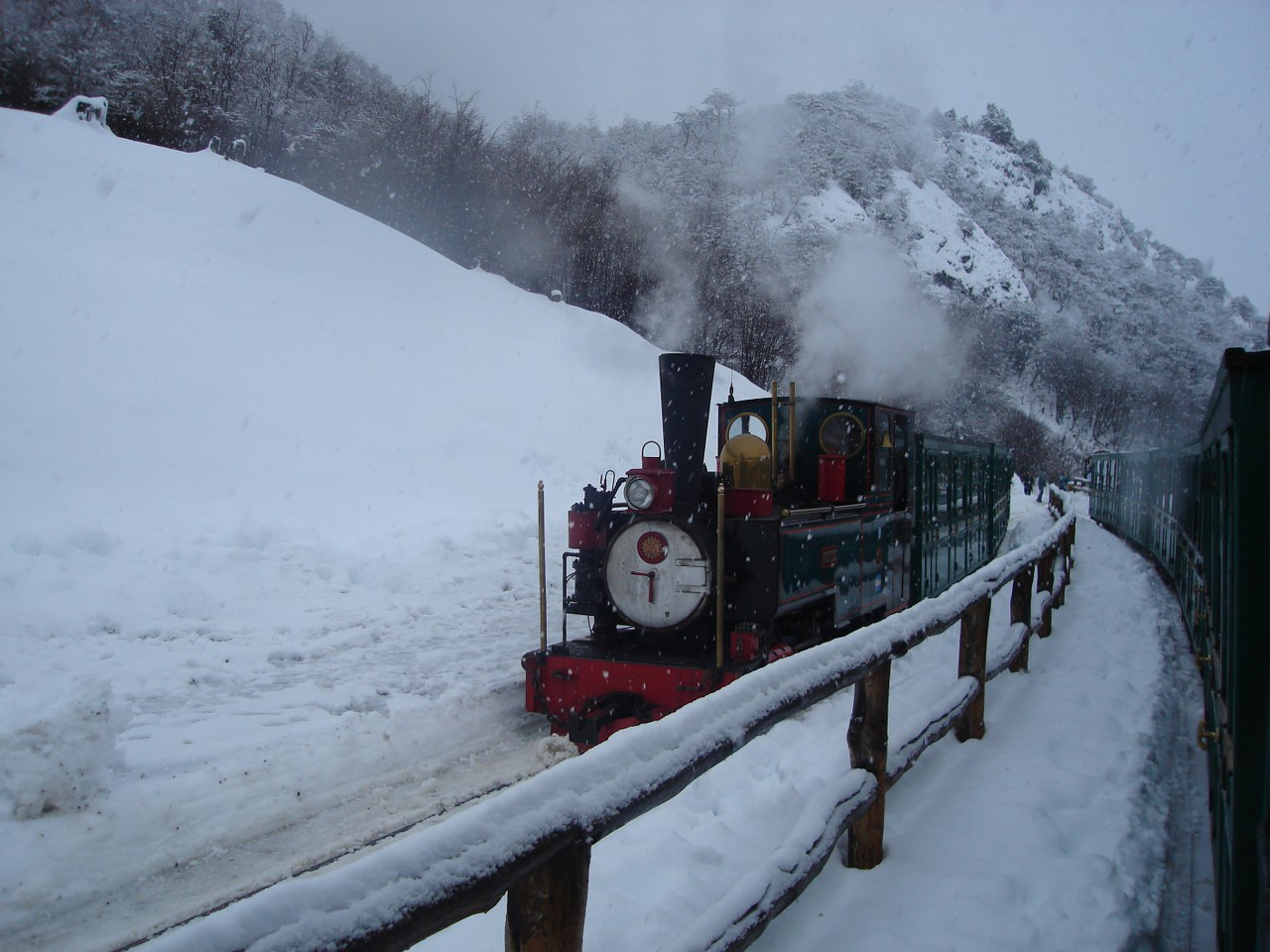
The Southern Fuegian Railway in Tierra del Fuego Province, Argentina.

The region has a subpolar oceanic climate and a mild tundra climate (Köppen climate classification Cfc and ET) with short, cool summers with a mean at around 10 °C (50 °F) and long, cool and wet winters with a mean at around 0 °C (32 °F). The northeast is characterized by strong winds and little precipitation, while in the south and west it is very windy, foggy, and wet most of the year, with precipitation levels averaging 3,000 millimetres (120 in) a year. The permanent snow line begins at 700 metres (2,300 ft). Places in the world with comparable climates are the Aleutian Islands, Iceland, Kuril Islands, Campbell Island, the Kerguelen Islands, the Scottish Highlands, and coastal areas of Norway.

In August 1995 the island was hit by an event of intense winds, cold and snowfall known as the White Earthquake. This caused the ferry service across Primera Angostura to be suspended, as well as the international road to Río Gallegos to be closed. In Timaukel alone the mayor reported that 150,000 sheep and 6,500 head of cattle were threatened by the event.

Climate data for Ushuaia Airport (1981–2010, extremes 1901–present) (Note: The record highs and lows are based on the Secretaria de Mineria link for the period 1901–1990 while records beyond 1990 come from the Servicio Meteorológico Nacional link since it only covers from 1961–present. When these 2 sources are used together, the record highs and lows are from the period 1901–present.)
Month	Jan	Feb	Mar	Apr	May	Jun	Jul	Aug	Sep	Oct	Nov	Dec	Year
Record high °C (°F)	29.5 (85.1)	28.9 (84.0)	25.6 (78.1)	22.2 (72.0)	20.3 (68.5)	19.0 (66.2)	17.5 (63.5)	18.0 (64.4)	22.3 (72.1)	21.2 (70.2)	26.3 (79.3)	29.0 (84.2)	29.5 (85.1)
Mean daily maximum °C (°F)	14.5 (58.1)	14.1 (57.4)	12.1 (53.8)	9.8 (49.6)	6.9 (44.4)	4.2 (39.6)	4.6 (40.3)	6.1 (43.0)	8.1 (46.6)	10.5 (50.9)	12.2 (54.0)	13.3 (55.9)	9.7 (49.5)
Daily mean °C (°F)	9.7 (49.5)	9.5 (49.1)	8.0 (46.4)	6.0 (42.8)	3.8 (38.8)	1.7 (35.1)	2.4 (36.3)	2.9 (37.2)	4.2 (39.6)	6.3 (43.3)	7.7 (45.9)	8.8 (47.8)	5.9 (42.6)
Mean daily minimum °C (°F)	5.6 (42.1)	5.6 (42.1)	4.3 (39.7)	2.9 (37.2)	1.1 (34.0)	−1.2 (29.8)	−1.1 (30.0)	−0.3 (31.5)	0.6 (33.1)	2.3 (36.1)	3.6 (38.5)	4.6 (40.3)	2.3 (36.1)
Record low °C (°F)	−2.0 (28.4)	−4.0 (24.8)	−4.3 (24.3)	−7.3 (18.9)	−20.2 (−4.4)	−18.2 (−0.8)	−21.0 (−5.8)	−19.6 (−3.3)	−10.6 (12.9)	−6.1 (21.0)	−6.0 (21.2)	−3.7 (25.3)	−21.0 (−5.8)
Average precipitation mm (inches)	49.5 (1.95)	42.1 (1.66)	46.8 (1.84)	55.9 (2.20)	47.6 (1.87)	56.4 (2.22)	40.1 (1.58)	36.0 (1.42)	34.5 (1.36)	36.1 (1.42)	41.3 (1.63)	50.7 (2.00)	537.0 (21.14)
Average precipitation days (≥ 0.1 mm)	17.1	14.2	14.9	15.8	14.0	14.2	15.3	14.4	13.3	14.4	16.0	16.8	180.4
Average snowy days	0.3	0.1	2	2	5	8	7	9	7	5	3	1	49.4
Average relative humidity (%)	75	76	78	80	81	82	82	80	76	73	72	74	77
Mean monthly sunshine hours	167.4	146.9	133.3	102.0	68.2	42.0	55.8	83.7	123.0	164.3	180.0	167.4	1,434
Percentage possible sunshine	32.0	34.5	33.5	31.5	25.7	18.5	22.5	27.5	34.0	37.5	37.0	28.5	30.2
Source 1: NOAA (humidity 1961–1990), World Meteorological Organization (average high and low, and precipitation), Secretaria de Mineria (extremes and sun, 1901–1990)
Source 2: Servicio Meteorológico Nacional (extremes), UNLP (snowfall data), Tokyo Climate Center (mean temperatures 1981–2010)

Climate data for Tolhuin (1991–2010 normals and extremes)
Month	Jan	Feb	Mar	Apr	May	Jun	Jul	Aug	Sep	Oct	Nov	Dec	Year
Record high °C (°F)	24.8 (76.6)	26.6 (79.9)	22.8 (73.0)	21.3 (70.3)	13.0 (55.4)	9.8 (49.6)	9.3 (48.7)	11.8 (53.2)	18.3 (64.9)	17.8 (64.0)	22.4 (72.3)	23.4 (74.1)	26.6 (79.9)
Mean daily maximum °C (°F)	14.1 (57.4)	13.9 (57.0)	12.0 (53.6)	8.9 (48.0)	5.4 (41.7)	2.7 (36.9)	2.5 (36.5)	4.3 (39.7)	6.9 (44.4)	9.9 (49.8)	11.9 (53.4)	13.2 (55.8)	8.8 (47.8)
Daily mean °C (°F)	9.4 (48.9)	9.0 (48.2)	7.1 (44.8)	4.6 (40.3)	1.6 (34.9)	−0.9 (30.4)	−1.3 (29.7)	0.7 (33.3)	2.8 (37.0)	5.1 (41.2)	6.9 (44.4)	8.4 (47.1)	4.5 (40.1)
Mean daily minimum °C (°F)	4.7 (40.5)	4.0 (39.2)	2.3 (36.1)	0.3 (32.5)	−2.2 (28.0)	−4.5 (23.9)	−5.0 (23.0)	−3.0 (26.6)	−1.4 (29.5)	0.3 (32.5)	2.0 (35.6)	3.6 (38.5)	0.1 (32.2)
Record low °C (°F)	−2.5 (27.5)	−3.6 (25.5)	−7.0 (19.4)	−7.8 (18.0)	−12.7 (9.1)	−23.0 (−9.4)	−23.5 (−10.3)	−17.0 (1.4)	−18.6 (−1.5)	−7.4 (18.7)	−7.2 (19.0)	−6.0 (21.2)	−23.5 (−10.3)
Average precipitation mm (inches)	64.4 (2.54)	46.4 (1.83)	54.1 (2.13)	51.7 (2.04)	52.0 (2.05)	49.8 (1.96)	41.6 (1.64)	41.4 (1.63)	38.1 (1.50)	35.8 (1.41)	40.7 (1.60)	59.8 (2.35)	575.8 (22.67)
Source: Servicio Meteorológico Nacional

Climate data for Rio Grande, Argentina (1981–2010, extremes 1941–1950 and 1961–present) (Note: The record highs and lows are based on the Secretaria de Mineria link for the period 1941–1950 and from 1971–1990 while records beyond 1961 come from the Servicio Meteorológico Nacional link. When these 2 sources are used together, the record highs and lows are from the periods 1941–1950 and from 1961–present)
Month	Jan	Feb	Mar	Apr	May	Jun	Jul	Aug	Sep	Oct	Nov	Dec	Year
Record high °C (°F)	27.5 (81.5)	30.8 (87.4)	27.0 (80.6)	23.0 (73.4)	15.4 (59.7)	13.5 (56.3)	11.6 (52.9)	12.8 (55.0)	17.5 (63.5)	21.0 (69.8)	23.4 (74.1)	24.8 (76.6)	30.8 (87.4)
Mean daily maximum °C (°F)	16.1 (61.0)	15.7 (60.3)	13.5 (56.3)	10.5 (50.9)	6.5 (43.7)	3.1 (37.6)	3.0 (37.4)	5.2 (41.4)	8.3 (46.9)	11.4 (52.5)	13.4 (56.1)	15.1 (59.2)	10.2 (50.4)
Daily mean °C (°F)	10.9 (51.6)	10.3 (50.5)	8.1 (46.6)	5.5 (41.9)	2.6 (36.7)	−0.1 (31.8)	−0.2 (31.6)	1.4 (34.5)	3.5 (38.3)	6.2 (43.2)	8.4 (47.1)	10.0 (50.0)	5.6 (42.1)
Mean daily minimum °C (°F)	5.7 (42.3)	5.4 (41.7)	3.5 (38.3)	1.6 (34.9)	−0.8 (30.6)	−3.2 (26.2)	−3.1 (26.4)	−1.7 (28.9)	−0.2 (31.6)	1.6 (34.9)	3.3 (37.9)	4.8 (40.6)	1.4 (34.5)
Record low °C (°F)	−5.1 (22.8)	−6.0 (21.2)	−8.2 (17.2)	−13.2 (8.2)	−13.1 (8.4)	−20.0 (−4.0)	−22.2 (−8.0)	−14.9 (5.2)	−10.7 (12.7)	−8.2 (17.2)	−6.6 (20.1)	−5.5 (22.1)	−22.2 (−8.0)
Average precipitation mm (inches)	36.0 (1.42)	29.7 (1.17)	27.2 (1.07)	28.8 (1.13)	29.4 (1.16)	26.7 (1.05)	23.9 (0.94)	20.7 (0.81)	17.1 (0.67)	18.5 (0.73)	27.0 (1.06)	36.0 (1.42)	321.0 (12.64)
Average precipitation days (≥ 0.1 mm)	12.4	10.9	9.9	9.8	9.9	8.0	7.6	7.6	7.9	7.8	9.2	11.3	112.3
Average relative humidity (%)	72.7	74.6	77.8	82.4	86.0	87.7	86.5	84.5	79.5	73.8	70.0	70.6	78.8
Mean monthly sunshine hours	170.5	175.2	155.0	114.0	77.5	84.0	86.8	114.7	147.0	186.0	186.0	192.2	1,688.9
Percentage possible sunshine	33	43	40	36	29	37	35	39	42	44	39	36	37.8
Source 1: Servicio Meteorológico Nacional
Source 2: Secretaria de Mineria (extremes and sun 1941–1950 and 1971–1990)

== Flora ==
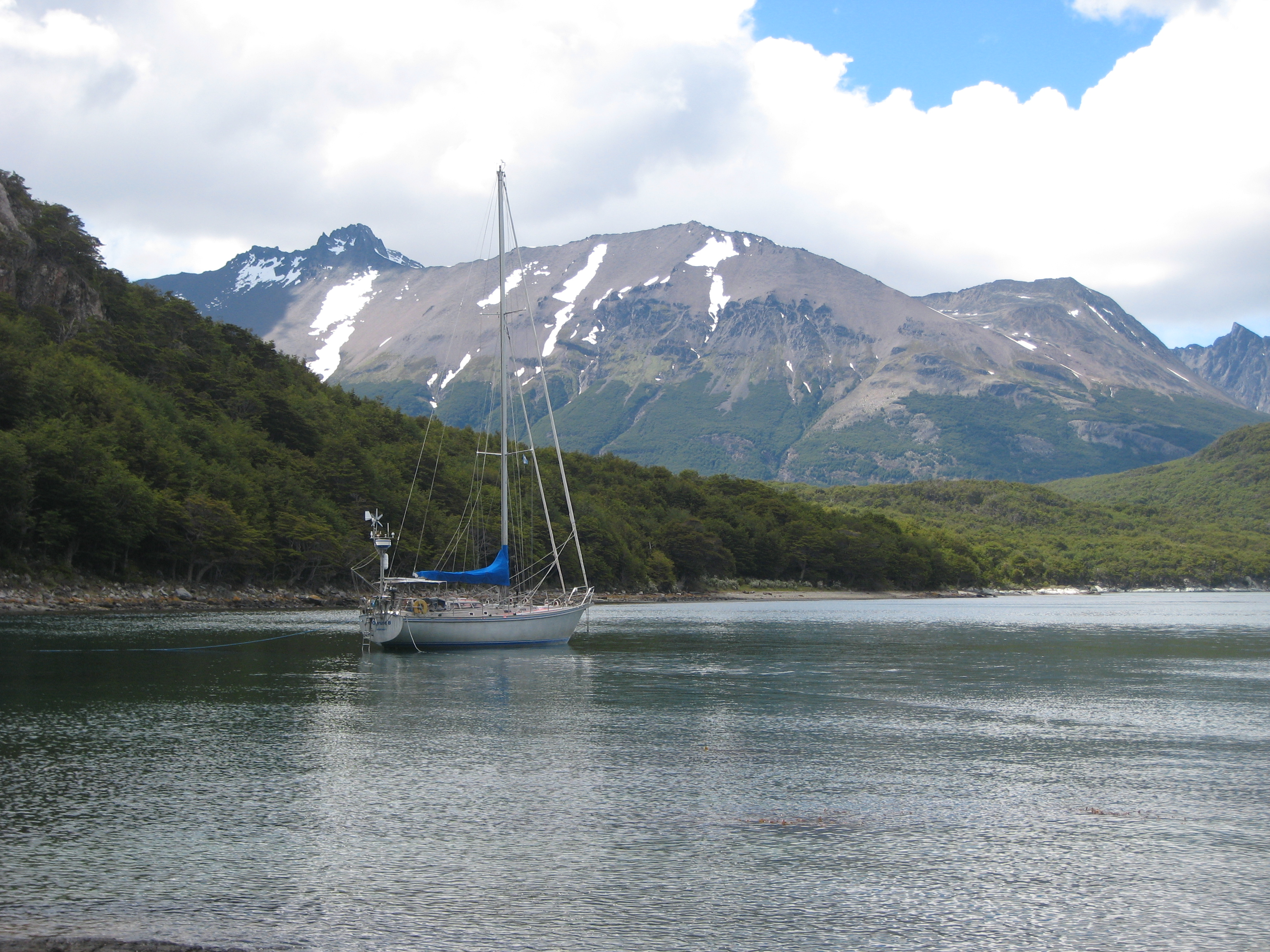
View of the Magellanic subpolar forests in Tierra del Fuego National Park, Argentina.

Only 30% of the islands have forests, which are classified as Magellanic subpolar; the northeast is made up by steppe and cool semidesert.

There are six species of tree found in Tierra del Fuego: Canelo or Winter's Bark (Drimys winteri), Maytenus magellanica, Pilgerodendron uviferum the southernmost conifer in the world, and three kinds of southern beech; Nothofagus antarctica, Nothofagus pumilio and the evergreen Nothofagus betuloides. Edible fruits grow in open spaces in these forests, such as beach strawberry (Fragaria chiloensis var. chiloensis forma chiloensis) and calafate (Berberis buxifolia), which have been collected by Indians and residents alike. These forests are unique in the world for having developed in a climate with such cold summers. Tree cover extends very close to the southernmost tip of South America. Winds are so strong that trees in wind-exposed areas grow twisted by the force of winds, and people call the trees "flag-trees" for the shape that they need to take in the fight with the wind. Tree vegetation extends as far south as the Isla de los Estados, Navarino Island and the north of Hoste Island. At altitudes above, dwarf Nothofagus communities are found. Going further south, Wollaston Islands and the south of Hoste Island are covered by subantarctic tundra.

The forests of Tierra del Fuego have been a source of trees that have been planted abroad in places with a similar climate but that were devoid of trees, such as the Faroe Islands and nearby archipelagos. Most species were gathered from the coldest places in Tierra del Fuego bordering the tundra. This resulted in positive changes, as the heavy winds and cool summers in the Faroe Islands had not formerly allowed the growth of trees from other regions in the world. In the Faroe Islands, the imported trees are used ornamentally, as curtains against wind, and for fighting erosion caused by storms and grazing.

== Economy ==
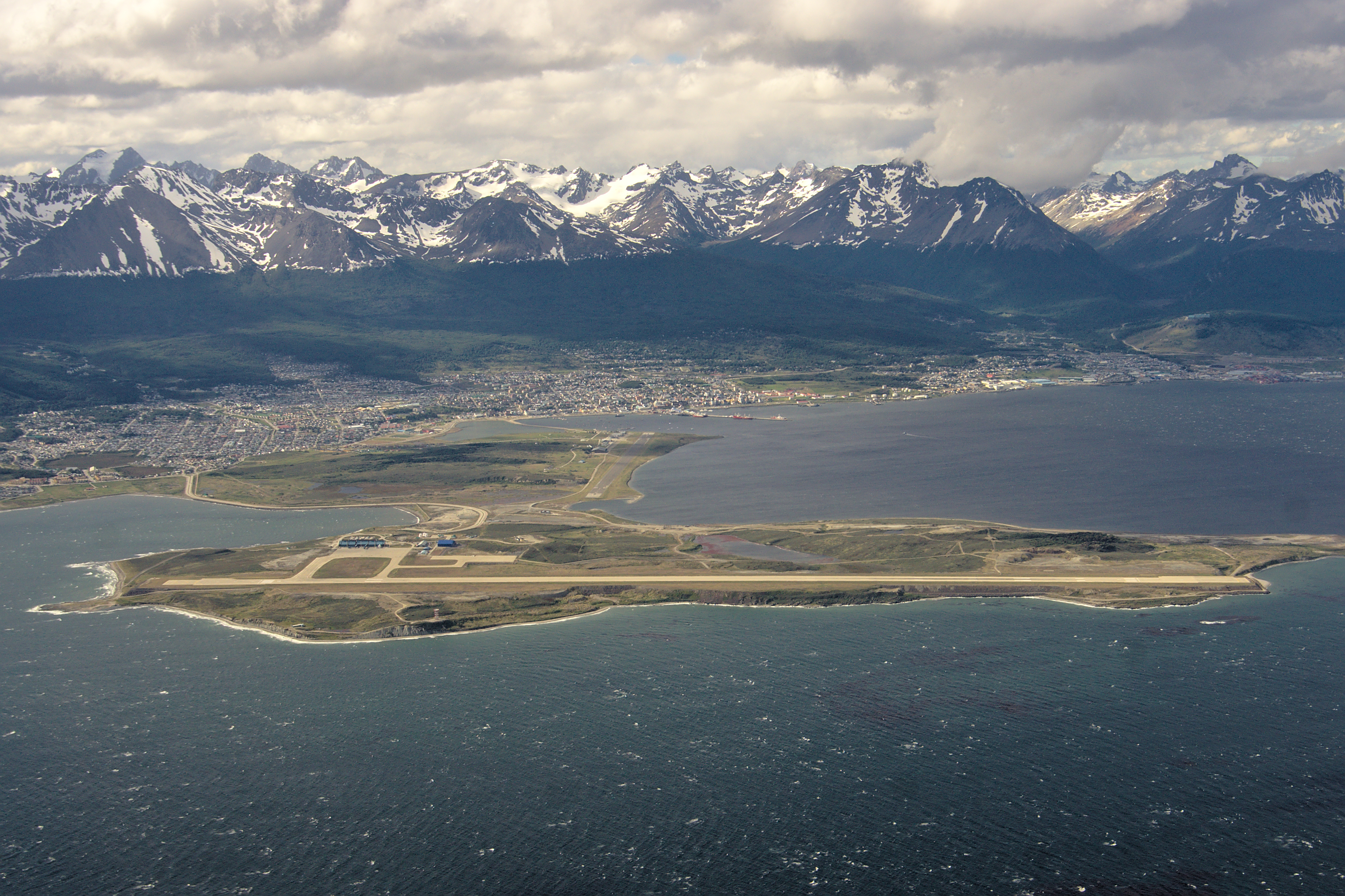
Ushuaia – Malvinas Argentinas International Airport in Argentina.

The main industries are oil, natural gas, sheep farming and ecotourism. On the Argentine side, several electronics companies have been established. Ushuaia is home to the small brewing company Cervecería Fueguina, which produces three beers under the Beagle brand name.

The fishing industry in Tierra del Fuego centers around the export of spider crabs, mussels, and other mollusks. Krill are abundant in nearby waters, but have not yet been successfully harvested. The agricultural sector in Tierra del Fuego is underdeveloped.

== See also ==
- Diego Ramírez Islands
- Karukinka Natural Park
- List of divided islands
- Magallanes and Antártica Chilena Region
- Tierra del Fuego gold rush
