= Karukinka Natural Park =

Private natural park in Isla Grande de Tierra del Fuego, Chile

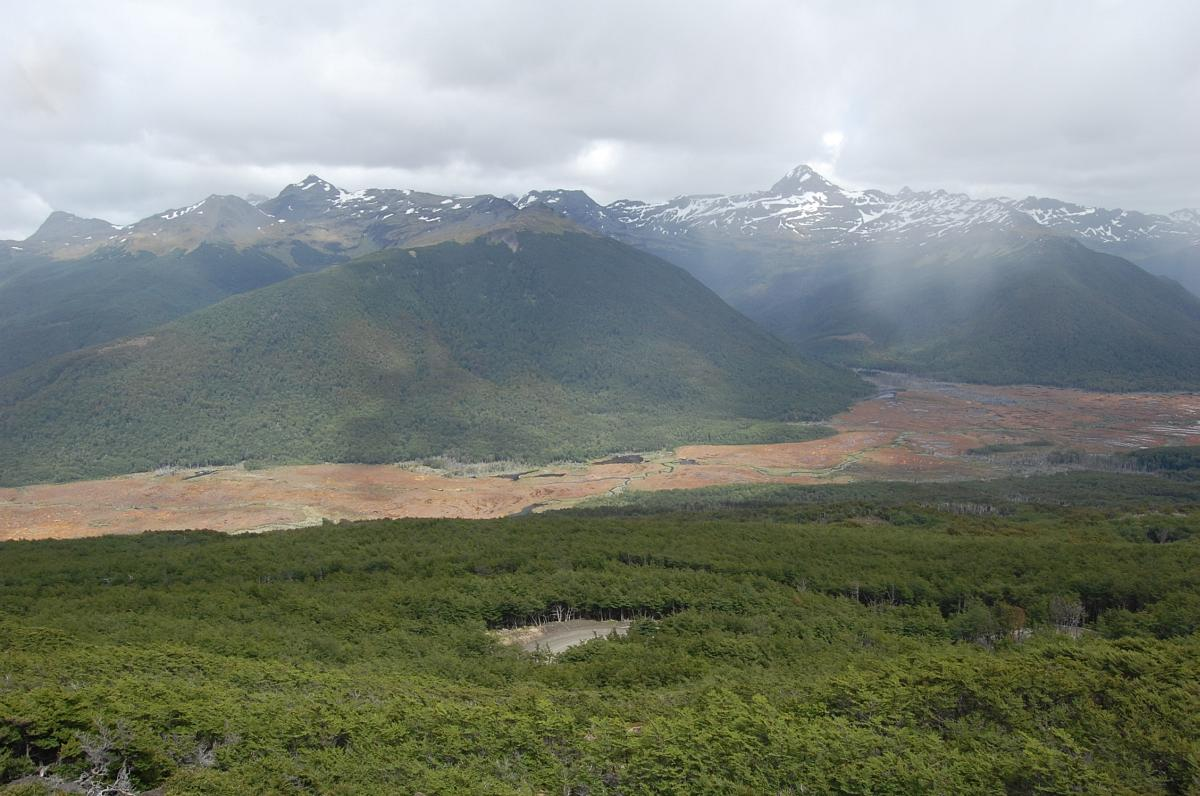

- Location within Southern Patagonia
- Location: Magallanes Region, Chile
- Coordinates: 53°42′S 69°18′W
- Area: 2,720 km^{2} (1,050 sq mi)
- Website: www.karukinkanatural.cl

Karukinka Natural Park (Spanish: Parque Natural Karukinka) is a private natural park located in the Chilean portion of the Isla Grande de Tierra del Fuego. The lands for the park were donated to the Wildlife Conservation Society by Goldman Sachs.
