= Punta Delgada, Chile =

Punta Delgada lighthouse
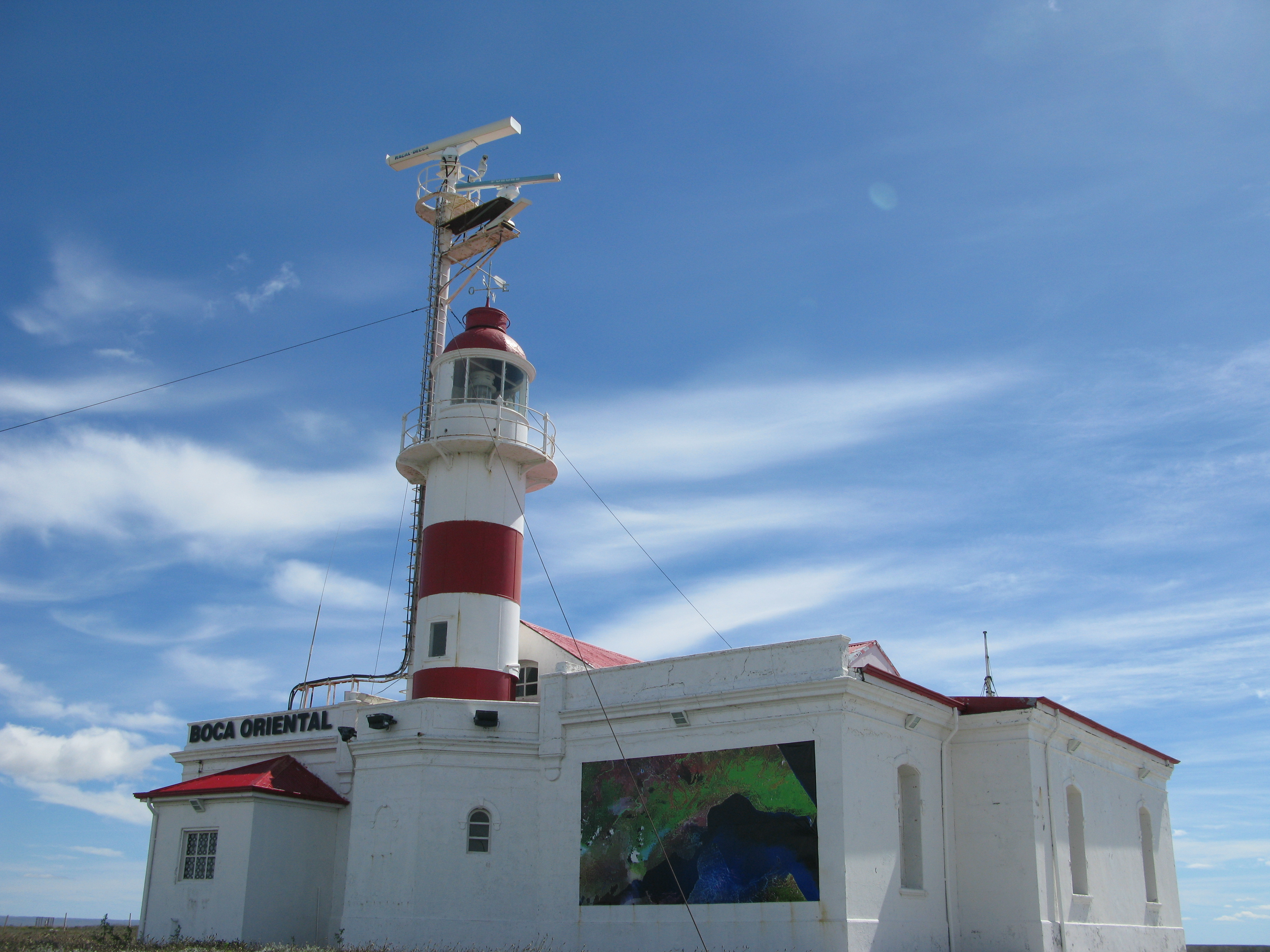
- Location: Punta Delgada, San Gregorio, Chile
- Coordinates: 52°27′24″S 69°32′48″W

Tower
- Constructed: 1898
- Construction: metal tower
- Height: 12 m (39 ft)
- Shape: cylindrical tower with balcony and lantern rising from 1-story signal station
- Markings: white tower with two horizontal bands, white lantern and red dome
- Power source: mains electricity
- Heritage: Historical Monument of Chile

Light
- Focal height: 21 m (69 ft)
- Range: 19 nmi (35 km; 22 mi)
- Characteristic: Fl W 5s

Punta Delgada is a small town in the far south of Chile, close to the border with Argentina, on the RN255 between Punta Arenas and Rio Gallegos. It is the principal settlement in the San Gregorio commune in Magallanes Province.

Since 1921, there has been a military station in the town holding an infantry battalion of the Chilean Army plus a small boat flotilla of the Chilean Navy, a Naval Signals/Communications headquarter, as well as a Navy SIGINT and naval intelligence forward base. Nearby is a ferry terminal at the Primera Angostura, from where the Pionero crosses the Strait of Magellan to Tierra del Fuego. Pali-Aike National Park lies 18 kilometers north of the town.

== See also ==
- Lighthouses in Chile
- List of lighthouses in Chile
