= Inútil Bay =

Bay in the Chilean part of Tierra del Fuego Island

Coordinates: 53°30′S 69°30′W

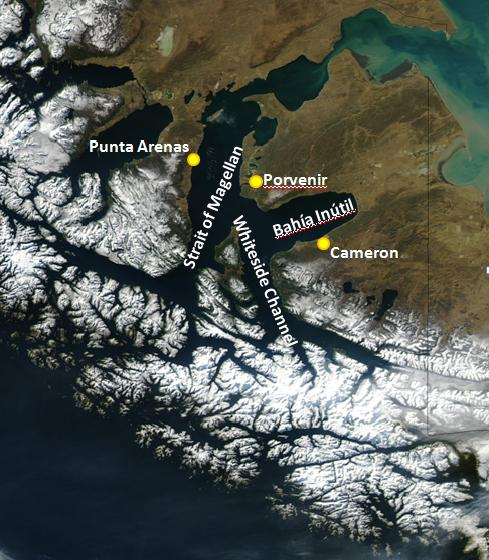
Satellite image of Inútil Bay and the Strait of Magellan. Selected settlements are marked with yellow dots.

Inútil Bay (Spanish: Bahía Inútil) or Useless Bay is a bay in the western and Chilean part of Tierra del Fuego Island. Located as a body of water in the Strait of Magellan, Inútil Bay provides access to Camerón and other settlements in Timaukel commune. Timaukel commune used to be called Bahía Inútil.

The Spanish word inútil can be translated as useless. The bay was thus named in 1827 by Captain Phillip Parker King, because it afforded "neither anchorage nor shelter, nor any other advantage for the navigator".

== Formation and natural features ==
During the last glacial period, glaciers covered what is now Bahía Inútil. At the peak of the Last Glacial Maximum, the ice field extended from north of present-day Punta Arenas, passing through the Strait of Magellan and reaching as far as the middle of the bay. As the glaciers retreated, a proglacial lake filled much of the area until the most recent glacial advance, which ended approximately 12,000 to 10,000 years ago.

Today, Bahía Inútil is a broad, flat bay lined by a coastal road that links several hamlets and small riverside settlements, including Caleta Rosario, Armonía, Caleta Jorquera, Puerto Nuevo, Onaisin (formerly Estancia Caleta Josefina), Estancia La Florida, Villa Cameron, and Timaukel. Along its eastern shore lies King Penguin Nature Reserve, a unique site on the continent where king penguins are regularly observed.

In recent years, the harvesting of mollusks and crustaceans has also been permitted in certain areas of the bay. Species such as navaja de mar (Ensis macha), Magellan mussel, Chilean mussel, Mytilidae, clams, picoroco (Austromegabalanus psittacus), maucho (Nacella magellanica), and lapa (Patellogastropoda) are among those collected in zones rich in marine life.

== Fauna ==
The macrobenthos of Inútil Bay is dominated by polychaete species, with 211 taxa recorded in a 2025 study.
