= Festuca gracillima =

Scientific classification
- Kingdom: Plantae
- Clade: Tracheophytes
- Clade: Angiosperms
- Clade: Monocots
- Clade: Commelinids
- Order: Poales
- Family: Poaceae
- Subfamily: Pooideae
- Genus: Festuca
- Species: F. gracillima

Binomial name
- Festuca gracillima Hook.f.

Species of grass

Festuca gracillima is a species of grass in the family Poaceae. This species is native to southern Argentina, and southern Chile. It is perennial and prefers temperate biomes. Festuca gracillima was first described in 1847.

In its native range, it is known in Spanish as coirón dulce ("sweet tussock grass") and coirón fueguino ("tussock grass of Tierra del Fuego").
