= Timaukel =

Commune in Magallanes y Antártica Chilena Region, Chile

- Commune
- Location of the Commune of Timaukel in Magallanes and Antartica Chilena Region Location in Chile
- Coordinates: 54°17′41″S 69°10′3″W
- Country: Chile
- Region: Magallanes y Antártica Chilena
- Province: Tierra del Fuego
- Founded as: Bahía Inútil
- Founded: December 30, 1927

Government
  - Type: Municipality
  - Alcalde: Marcos Martic Haros

Area
  - Total: 10,995.9 km^{2} (4,245.5 sq mi)
- Elevation: 338 m (1,109 ft)

Population (2012 Census)
  - Total: 204
  - Density: 0.019/km^{2} (0.048/sq mi)
  - Urban: 0
  - Rural: 423

Sex
  - Men: 376
  - Women: 47
- Time zone: UTC-4 (CLT)
  - Summer (DST): UTC-3 (CLST)
- Area code: 56 + 61
- Website: Municipality of Timaukel

Timaukel is a commune located in the Chilean part of Tierra del Fuego Island. It is part of Tierra del Fuego Province in Magallanes Region. The commune is administered by the municipality in Villa Cameron, which is the main port and settlement within the commune.

== Demographics ==
Historical population
Year	Pop.	±% p.a.
1930	565	—
1940	1,185	+7.69%
1952	1,002	−1.39%
1970	445	−4.41%
1982	406	−0.76%
1992	252	−4.66%
2002	423	+5.32%
2017	405	−0.29%
2024	157	−12.66%
Source: "Censo de Población y Vivienda". National Statistics Institute.

According to the 2002 census of the National Statistics Institute, Timaukel spans an area of 10,995.9 km^{2} (4,246 sq mi) and has 423 inhabitants (376 men and 47 women), making the commune an entirely rural area. The population grew by 68% (171 persons) between the 1992 and 2002 censuses.

It is a distinctly rural commune, almost deserted, most of the population is of English origin, who live on farms and is devoted to agriculture, there are also some sawmills. In recent years tourism has become important.

== Administration ==
As a commune, Timaukel is a third-level administrative division of Chile administered by a municipal council, headed by an alcalde who is directly elected every four years. The 2012–2016 alcalde is Alfonso Simunovic Ojeda.

Within the electoral divisions of Chile, Timaukel is represented in the Chamber of Deputies by Juan Morano (PDC) and Gabriel Boric (Ind.) as part of the 60th electoral district, which includes the entire Magallanes y la Antártica Chilena Region. The commune is represented in the Senate by Carlos Bianchi Chelech (Ind.) and Carolina Goic (PDC) as part of the 19th senatorial constituency (Magallanes y la Antártica Chilena Region).
