= Tierra del Fuego Province, Chile =

Tierra del Fuego Province Provincia de Tierra del Fuego
- Province
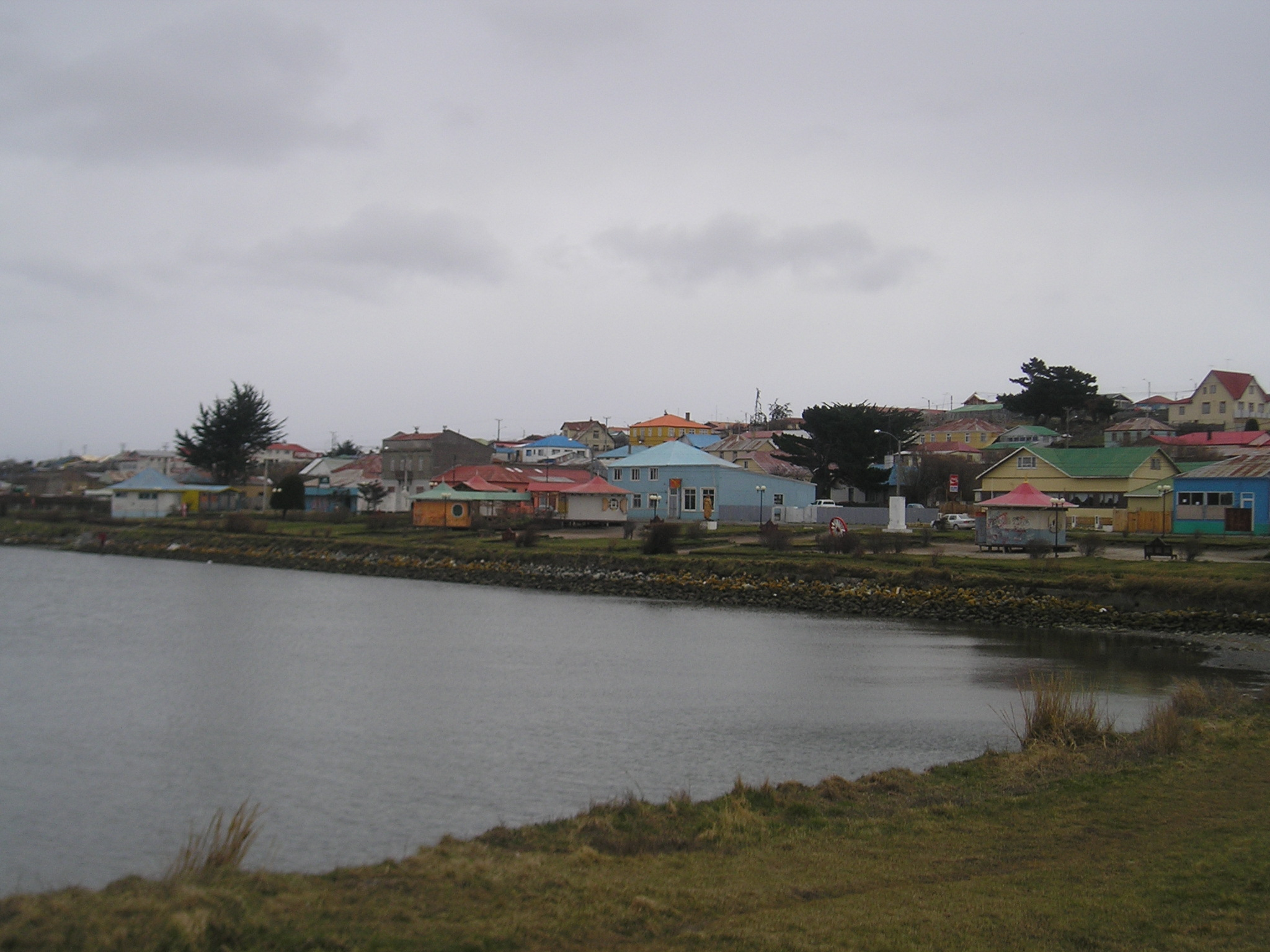
- Porvenir

- Seal

- Location in the Magallanes Region

- Location in Chile
- Coordinates: 53°36′S 69°23′W
- Country: Chile
- Region: Magallanes y Antártica Chilena
- Capital: Porvenir
- Communes: Porvenir; Primavera; Timaukel

Government
  - Type: Provincial
  - Presidential provincial delegate: Karim Fierro Brstilo

Area
  - Total: 22,592.7 km^{2} (8,723.1 sq mi)

Population (2012 Census)
  - Total: 6,656
  - Density: 0.2946/km^{2} (0.7630/sq mi)
  - Urban: 4,734
  - Rural: 2,170

Sex
  - Men: 4,418
  - Women: 2,486
- Time zone: UTC-3 (CLST)
  - Summer (DST): UTC-3 (CLST)
- Area code: 56 + 61
- Website: Government of Tierra del Fuego

Tierra del Fuego Province (Spanish: Provincia de Tierra del Fuego) is one of four provinces in the southern Chilean region of Magallanes and Antártica Chilena (XII). It includes the Chilean or western part of the main island of Tierra del Fuego, except for the part south of the Cordillera Darwin, which is in Antártica Chilena Province.

Chilean Tierra del Fuego has two towns, Porvenir, capital of the province, and Cerro Sombrero, and a number of small villages. A key geographical feature is Bahía Inútil ("Useless Bay"), so named by British geographers in the late 19th century because the bay is not useful as a port.

== Geology and hydrography ==
Gold-bearing sands have been recorded at a number of sites within the Fuegan shores of the Tierra del Fuego Province. Chilean Tierra del Fuego is known for numerous small lakes, including Lago Blanco and Lago Deseado. The climate is Subpolar Oceanic, bordering on a Tundra climate.

== Demography ==
According to the 2002 census by the National Statistics Institute (INE), the province spans an area of 22,592.7 km^{2} (8,723 sq mi) and had a population of 6,904 inhabitants (4,418 men and 2,486 women), giving it a population density of 0.3/km^{2} (1/sq mi). It is the third most sparsely populated province in the country after Antártica Chilena and Capitan Prat, and it is the fifth least-populated province in the country. Of these, 4,734 (68.6%) lived in urban areas and 2,170 (31.4%) in rural areas. Between the 1992 and 2002 censuses, the population fell by 1.2% (81 persons).

== History ==
The shores among the islands have provided settlement locations for thousands of years of early humans in the Americas. In particular, the Wulaia Bay area of Navarino Island (south of the province) has yielded evidence of settlement by the Yaghan people more than 10,000 years ago.

A gold rush occurred in the late 19th and early 20th century.

== See also ==
- Tierra del Fuego Province, Argentina
- Tierra del Fuego Archipelago
- Isla Grande de Tierra del Fuego
- Tierra del Fuego gold rush
- 1949 Tierra del Fuego earthquake
- Porvenir, Chile
- Magallanes and Antártica Chilena Region
