= Sandover =

Sandover may refer to:

== People ==
- Alfred Sandover (1866–1958), a British-Australian hardware merchant and philanthropist
- Raymond Sandover (1910–1995), a soldier in Australian and British Armies
- William Sandover (1822–1909), South Australian politician and hotelier

== Places ==
- Sandover, Northern Territory, a locality in Australia
- Sandover Highway, a road in Australia
- Sandover River, a river in Australia

== Other uses ==
- Sandover Medal, Australian rules football award
- Sandover Village, starting point in the Jak and Daxter video game universe; site of Samos the Sage

== See also ==
- The Changing Light at Sandover, 560-page epic poem by James Merrill (1926–1995)
- Standover (disambiguation)
