= J. Alastair Montgomerie =

Scottish businessperson and naval officer

Lieutenant commander John Alastair Montgomerie DSC, KStJ (9 August 1914 – 17 December 1989) was a Scottish businessman and Royal Navy officer during World War II. At war's end, he was the founder and honorary commodore of the Royal Naval Volunteer Reserve Club (Scotland) headquartered on the Carrick in Glasgow.

== Education ==
Montgomerie was educated at Strathallan School, Perthshire and Downing College, Cambridge. He played for the Cambridge University Ice Hockey Club and was elected a member of the Hawks' Club. After a short period at Harvard University he joined the family bakery business, Montgomerie & Co in Glasgow.

== Naval career ==
During the Second World War, Montgomerie served with the Royal Navy as an officer on various Motor Torpedo Boats (MTB) as part of the Coastal Forces of the Royal Navy. On 1 July 1941 Montgomerie was mentioned in despatches.

In December 1944, Montgomerie commanding 59 Flotilla, arrived in Malta from the United Kingdom (UK). The objective was to provide relief and support to the MTBs already operating in the Adriatic Campaign. The 59th Flotilla had been on operations around UK waters for over a year, including the Normandy landings and its sailors considered to be 'seasoned campaigners'.

59 Flotilla arrived in the Dalmatian Islands in January 1945. On the night of 15–16 January, Montgomerie in MTB 699, supported by 706 and 698, was sent to destroy three E-boats that had run aground on Unie Island off Lussino. The E-boats were found and destroyed, ensuring they could not be salvaged and put back into service.

The Flotilla undertook 64 patrols, with some help from 57 Flotilla, in the month of February from Zara. A record for the Mediterranean theatre, yet the MTBs had limited contact with Axis boats. Montgomerie saw action on 12–13 March when he intercepted three Axis vessels rounding the southern point of the Istrian Peninsula whilst blockading the Arsa Channel. The battle lasted several hours and the MTBs 699, 703 and 710 succeeded in preventing the Axis boats from making progress.

On 12 April, Montgomerie in MTB 670 was instructed, along with 697, 643 and 658 to patrol the northern end of the Planinski Channel and attack any Axis boats coming south from Fiume. The MTBs engaged an Axis force near the island of Krk, resulting in the sinking of TA45. Within weeks the Dalmatian Campaign was over.

On 21 August 1945, Montgomerie was one of a number of officers and crew who were honoured for their role in the actions of 59 Flotilla on 12–13 April 1945. He was awarded the Distinguished Service Cross (DSC). The citation reads:

For courage, audacity and skill shown whilst serving in the 59th M.T.B. Flotilla, in an engagement with a superior German force on the 12th-13th April off the coast of Jugoslavia during the course of which an enemy destroyer was sunk.

— London Gazette

Montgomerie retired from the Royal Navy with the rank of lieutenant commander but his subsequent post-war work on behalf of naval interests led to the title of Honorary Commander, Royal Naval Reserve.

He was credited with the foundation of the Royal Naval Volunteer Reserve, R.N.V.R Club (Scotland) in 1947, which was subsequently based on the Carrick in Glasgow.

Montgomerie was instrumental in the restoration of the Cutty Sark in London.

== Later life ==
After the war, he became chairman of Montgomerie & Co before selling to Spillers. He was also Deacon of the Incorporation of Bakers and the Incorporation of Tailors in Glasgow.

Montgomerie served as a member of The Royal Company of Archers, The Queen's Bodyguard for Scotland. He was chairman of the King George's Fund for Sailors charity, a keen Rotarian and member of the English-Speaking Union. Montgomerie was also a Knight of the Order of Saint John (KStJ).

He was father-in-law to Ian Lang, Baron Lang of Monkton.
