= Alfred Sandover =

Alfred Sandover MBE
- Born: 24 November 1866; Plymouth, England
- Died: 4 May 1958 (aged 91); Perth, Western Australia
- Education: North Adelaide Grammar School
- Occupation: Businessman
- Years active: 1884–1957
- Spouse: Rose Allen (1895–1943)
- Relatives: William Sandover (father), Eric Sandover (son), Raymond Sandover (great nephew)

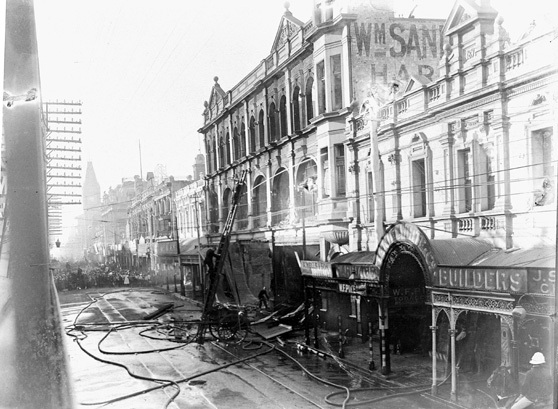
Fire in the Sandover store, Hay St., Perth, April 1907

Alfred Sandover M.B.E. (24 November 1866 – 4 May 1958), was a British-Australian hardware merchant and philanthropist born in Plymouth, England, the youngest of five children. Graduating from North Adelaide Grammar School in 1881, he came to Perth, Western Australia, in 1884, arriving in Fremantle when the temperature was 41 °C (106 °F) and vowing to stay not a day over his contract. In 1921, Sandover donated the medal bearing his name as the West Australian Football League's annual award recognising the league's fairest and best player of the regular season.

== Personal life ==
Sandover was the youngest of five children of William Sandover and his wife Mary Billing, née Bates. William was a hotelier and later a politician in South Australia. While on a visit to England, Alfred was born on 24 November 1866. The family returned to Adelaide, on the City of Adelaide, arriving on 12 October 1867. Educated at North Adelaide Grammar School, in 1881 Sandover attained first-class honours in the senior public examination.

His older brother, William Sandover, Jnr., (c. 1856 – c. 22 May 1921) had moved to Western Australia around 1880 and opened a chemist's shop and hardware store, and called on Alfred to help him run the business, W. Sandover & Co. Alfred arrived in Fremantle in 1884, and initially found the dust, the glare, and temperature of 41 °C (106 °F), unbearable; he determined to return as soon as his contract term elapsed, yet Sandover eventually decided to remain in Western Australia for the rest of his life. The company prospered: gold was discovered at Coolgardie and Kalgoorlie, and the 1890s saw a huge demand for machinery and all kinds of hardware which W. Sandover & Co. was able to supply.

On 11 July 1895, Alfred Sandover married Rose Allen at St. Georges Church in Malvern, Victoria, and in 1896 they bought an 8-acre (32,000 m^{2}) property in Claremont, which they named "Knutsford". In 1921, Sandover provided for the Western Australian Football league the medal for the fairest and best footballer during the regular season. The medal is awarded annually in the week before the grand final with a descendant of Sandover present for the presentation. Sandover was awarded a Member of the Order of the British Empire (M.B.E.) in 1951.

He retired in 1957 at the age of 90 and died at home on 4 May 1958.
