= William Sandover =

Australian politician

William Sandover (21 September 1822 – 5 March 1909) was a British hotelier and politician in South Australia, the father of Alfred Sandover MBE and great grandfather of Raymond Sandover DSO, ED.

== History ==
He was born in Cornwood, Devon, England, on 21 September 1822, and spent most of his youth in London. He emigrated to South Australia on the Glenelg, arriving on 13 February 1849; William Morgan was a fellow-passenger. He joined the gold rush to Victoria and was moderately successful, and on his return took up hotel keeping.

In March 1854 William Sandover was granted the publican's licence for the Sturt Hotel, Grenfell Street, which was destroyed by fire some 18 months later. He retired twelve years later, and apart from parliamentary duties and three trips to England (on one of these visits, taken aboard the City of London, son Alfred was born), lived quietly at his home "Rosslyn" in Rose Park.

== Politics ==
In April 1868 he was elected to the seat of Gumeracha in the Legislative Assembly, with Alexander Hay as colleague. He did not stand at the following election in 1870, but in September 1873 won the vacant seat on the Legislative Council caused by the death of John Bentham Neales. This was in the days when Legislative Council seats were voted for by the entire colony as a single electorate "The Province". He did not seek reelection at the end of his term in 1885.

== Family ==
William Sandover (c. 1821 – 5 March 1909) married Mary Billing Bate (3 August 1823 – 19 August 1913) on 23 January 1854; they lived in Angas Street, Adelaide, later "Rosslyn", Rose Park. Among their five children were:

- William Sandover Jr. (19 July 1856 – 23 May 1921) was a student at AEI, founded WA hardware merchants W. Sandover & Co., married Bertha Jewell (died 6 March 1895) on 20 December 1882. They left WA for England, where Bertha died. He married again, to Constance Atherton on 20 February 1896 and lived in Richmond, Surrey, England. He became the Mayor of the Municipal Borough of Richmond in 1905 and was also a member of Surrey County Council. The grandfather of Raymond Sandover, he died while returning from a visit to WA and SA, and was buried at sea.
- Ellen Sandover (1861 – 24 July 1945) married Robert Henry Kay of 12 Portrush Road Marryatville on 4 August 1893
- Elizabeth Sandover (1864 – 11 October 1940) educated at Mme. Marval's school, lived at Rose Park.
- Alfred Sandover (24 November 1866 – 4 May 1958), partner and managing director WA hardware merchants W. Sandover & Co., philanthropist remembered as donor of Sandover Medal.

His sister Louisa died 26 January 1877 aged 56 years
