= Standover =

Standover may refer to:

- Standover height, a measurement of a bicycle frame
- the use of intimidation or threats of force to coerce others into submission or compliance
