= Raymond Sandover =

British Brigadier who served in the Australian Army

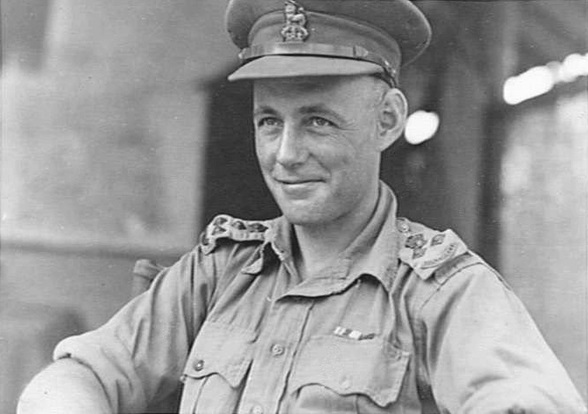
- Brigadier Raymond Sandover at Lae Base, 3 October 1944
- Born: 28 March 1910; Richmond, England
- Died: 12 August 1995 (aged 85); Surrey, England
- Relatives: William Sandover (great-grandfather); Alfred Sandover (great uncle)
- Military career
- Allegiance: United Kingdom; Australia
- Branch: Territorial Army; Australian Army
- Rank: Brigadier
- Service number: WX5
- Commands: Lae Base Sub-Area (1945); 6th Brigade (1943–1945); 2/11th Battalion (1941–1943)
- Conflicts: Second World War
- Awards: Distinguished Service Order; Mentioned in Despatches (3); Efficiency Decoration

Raymond Ladais Sandover, DSO, ED (28 March 1910 – 12 August 1995) was a brigadier in the Australian Army. During the Second World War, he commanded the 2/11th Battalion from 1941 to 1943 and the 6th Australian Infantry Brigade between 1943 and 1945.

Promoted to brigadier in May 1943, at the time he was the youngest officer in the Australian Army to hold that rank.

== Early life and career ==
Born on 28 March 1910 at Richmond, London, Sandover was educated at Rugby School and the University of Bonn. In 1929, he joined a Territorial battalion of the East Surrey Regiment. He qualified as a chartered accountant and went on to work for the family business in Perth, Western Australia.

At the outbreak of the Second World War in September 1939, Sandover volunteered to serve with the Second Australian Imperial Force. Joining the 2/11th Infantry Battalion, he subsequently led them through the Battle of Crete.

== Battle of Crete ==
Commanding the 2/11th Battalion, Sandover took up defensive positions in the hills around the airstrip of Rethymno, Crete, along with the 2/1st Battalion, supported by elements of 2/3rd Field Regiment, 2/1st Machine Gun Battalion and members of the Cretan Police. Lieutenant Colonel Ian Campbell, commander of the 2/1st Battalion, was appointed overall commander of the Rethymno Force.

On 20 May 1941 German paratroopers landed on Crete. The fighting was severe at times as the Australian and Greek units fought to contain the German landings.

Campbell's forces were doing well in comparison with allied efforts on other parts of the island. The 2/11th Battalion along with the Cretan Police were able to force back the German paratroopers to Perivolia in which the 2/11th Battalion, in a series of counter attacks, attempted to drive the German forces from the village.

On 28 May the British main force was in full retreat. Messages to Lieutenant Colonel Campbell informing him of the retreat and evacuation never reached Rethymno. By 29 May the Rethymno force was trapped but had still denied German forces the airfield.

On 29 May Lieutenant Colonel Campbell surrendered but Sandover gave his men the option of either surrendering or, after destroying their weapons, taking to the mountains and escaping from Crete in any way possible. Many of Sandover's men took the latter option and evaded capture, living in the mountains with assistance from the local civilian population. Sandover himself along with some of his men successfully avoided capture, finding shelter in the caves around Preveli Monastery, with help from the monks and townspeople. Months later he escaped Crete by submarine in late July 1941, possibly aboard HMS Thrasher, although Sandover later claimed he left the island on the HMS Torbay. Both submarines were involved in the evacuation.

== Battle of Wide Bay–Open Bay ==
The landing at Jacquinot Bay was an Allied amphibious operation during the New Britain Campaign that was conducted as part of a change of garrison with the Australians taking over from US Infantry Divisions.

On 4 November 1944, Sandover's 6th Brigade landed largely unopposed with the initial landing by 14th/32nd Battalion with support from naval forces and aircraft.

== Promotions ==
Sandover was promoted four times from 1941 to 1946.

- 20 April 1941
Temporary lieutenant colonel
- 22 November 1941
Lieutenant colonel
- 1 May 1943
Colonel
- 1 May 1943
Temporary brigadier
- 19 January 1946
Granted the honorary rank of brigadier

== Commands ==
Sandover commanded the 2/11th Infantry Battalion, the 6th Australian Infantry Brigade and the Lae Base Sub-area. He retired from military service on 19 January 1946.

- 20 April 1941
1 May 1943
Commanding Officer 2/11th Infantry Battalion.
- 1 May 1943
27 July 1945
Commanding Officer 6th Australian Infantry Brigade [New Britain].
- 28 July 1945
11 December 1945
Commanding Officer Lae Base Sub-Area.
- 19 January 1946

Retired from Military Service.

== Awards and honours ==
Sandover was Mentioned in Despatches on three occasions and awarded the Distinguished Service Order (DSO) for leadership during the advance to the Wide and Open Bay areas during the New Britain Campaign.

- 23 June 1942 – Mentioned in Despatches
- 19 July 1945 – Mentioned in Despatches for distinguished services in the South-West Pacific Area.
- 14 February 1946 – The Distinguished Service Order (DSO) for leadership during the advance to the Wide and Open Bay areas in 1945.
- 6 March 1947 – Mentioned in Despatches for exceptional service in the field in the South-West Pacific Area.

== Post-war ==
After the war he returned to England, where he was a director of the family business. He died 12 August 1995 at Surrey, England.
