= Carlos Bianchi Chelech =

Chilean politician

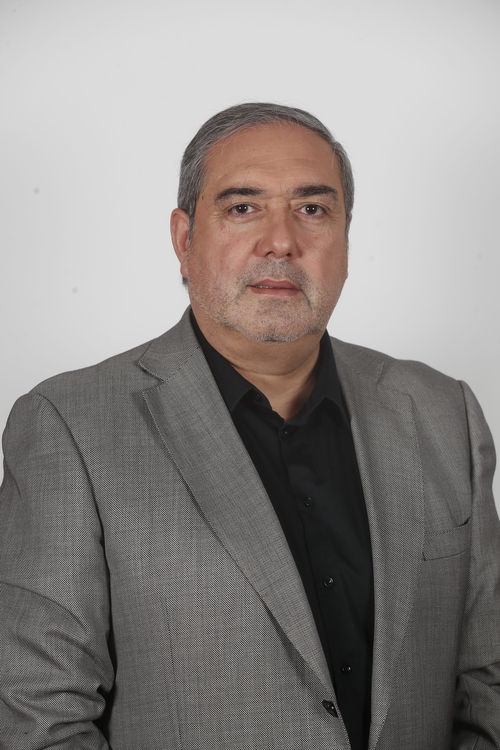

Member of the Chamber of Deputies
- Incumbent
- Assumed office 11 March 2022
- Preceded by: District created
- Constituency: District 28

Member of the Senate
- In office 11 March 2006 – 11 March 2022
- Preceded by: Sergio Fernández
- Succeeded by: Karim Bianchi
- Constituency: 17th Circumscription (Aysén Region)

Personal details
- Born: 4 November 1960 (age 65) Punta Arenas, Chile
- Party: Independent
- Children: Two
- Parent(s): Antonio Bianchi; Nuria Chelech
- Relatives: Karim Bianchi (son)
- Education: University of Chile (LL.B)
- Occupation: Politician
- Profession: Lawyer

Carlos Antonio Karim Bianchi Chelech (born 4 November 1960) is a Chilean politician who has served as Senator and Deputy for his country.

== Early life and family ==
He was born in Punta Arenas on 4 November 1960. He is the son of Antonio Rafael Bianchi Panicucci and Nuria Bernarda Chelech Chelech.

He is the father of two children. One of them, Karim Bianchi, is a member of the Senate representing the Magallanes Region for the 2022–2030 term, and previously served as a member of the Chamber of Deputies for the 28th District, Magallanes Region, during the 2018–2022 term.

== Professional career ==
Bianchi completed his primary education at the Escuela Croacia of Punta Arenas and his secondary education at the Liceo Luis Alberto Barrera in the same city. He obtained the professional degree of Public Administrator and the academic degree of Bachelor in Public Administration.

He has completed specialization courses in areas such as taxation, municipal management, and conflict resolution at the Adolfo Ibáñez University. He also holds a postgraduate diploma in Senior Public Management from the University of Chile.

Between 1981 and 1988, he worked as a production manager in media organizations. From that year until 1992, he served in media management roles. From 1994 to 1996, he was director of Radio Magallanes.

In the productive sector, he participated in business partnerships for the distribution of various products and owned commercial establishments in different industries.

== Political career ==
He began his political career in the 2000 municipal elections, when he was elected as a municipal councilor for the commune of Punta Arenas for the 2000–2004 term.

In 2003, he ran as an independent candidate for mayor of the same municipality in the Magallanes Region, but was not elected.

In the 2005 parliamentary elections, he ran for a seat in the Senate representing the 19th Circumscription, Magallanes Region, as an independent candidate outside of any political coalition. He was elected for the 2006–2014 term with 18,275 votes, corresponding to 27.72% of the valid votes, breaking for the first time the binominal electoral system and becoming the first senator elected outside of a coalition.

In 2013, he ran for re-election in the same circumscription, again as an independent candidate outside of a coalition, for the 2014–2022 term. He was re-elected with 16,330 votes, equivalent to 27.46% of the valid votes, breaking the binominal system for a second time.

In December 2013, together with former senator Antonio Horvath, he founded the political movement Democracia Regional, which in March of the following year became the Regional Patagonian Democracy Party. He left the party in 2016.

In August 2021, he ran for the Chamber of Deputies in the 28th District, which includes the communes of Antártica, Cabo de Hornos, Laguna Blanca, Natales, Porvenir, Primavera, Punta Arenas, Río Verde, San Gregorio, Timaukel and Torres del Paine, Magallanes Region, for the 2022–2026 term. In November, he was elected as an independent candidate with the highest vote share, obtaining 26,338 votes, corresponding to 40.52% of the valid votes. Under Law No. 21,238, he was barred from running again for the Senate.
