= Karim Bianchi =

Chilean politician

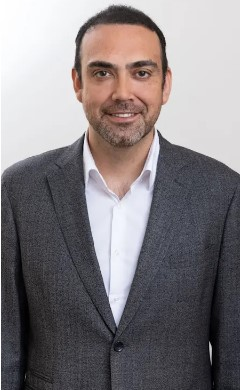

Member of the Senate of Chile
- Incumbent
- Assumed office 11 March 2022
- Preceded by: Carlos Bianchi
- Constituency: 15th Circumscription (Magallanes Region)

Member of the Chamber of Deputies of Chile
- In office 11 March 2018 – 11 March 2022
- Preceded by: District created
- Constituency: District 28

Regional Counselor of Chile
- In office 2009–2012
- Constituency: Magallanes Region

Personal details
- Born: 31 January 1983 (age 43) Santiago, Chile
- Children: One
- Parent(s): Carlos Bianchi; Blanca Retamales
- Education: UNIACC University (BA)
- Occupation: Politician
- Profession: Economist

Karim Antonio Bianchi Retamales (born 31 January 1983) is a Chilean politician who is currently serving as senator.

From 2009 to 2012, he served as regional councilor in Magallanes. He first ran unsuccessfully for National Congress of Chile in 2013, but in 2017 was elected as an independent deputy on the Radical Party's list, representing District 28. During his term (2018–2022), he worked on commissions covering science and technology, public works, transport, telecommunications, and extreme zones, and presided over investigative commissions. In April 2019, he assumed the presidency of the Science and Technology Commission.

Later, he achieved a historic victory by being elected senator as an independent with nearly 50% of the vote, the highest percentage and number ever recorded in the region. He became the first senator to win outside any list under the proportional system, overcoming the combined votes of competing party lists.

As senator, he has taken part in commissions on government, decentralization, economy, culture, heritage and —newly— sports, transport, telecommunications, and special territories, consolidating his role as a leading figure in Magallanes politics.

== Biography ==
He was born on January 31, 1983, in Punta Arenas. Son of independent politician Carlos Bianchi Chelech and Blanca Rosa Retamales Espinoza. He is a father and has one daughter.

He completed his primary education at Liceo San José and his secondary education at Charles Darwin School, both in his hometown. He holds a degree in Business and Economics (Commercial Engineering) from the University of Arts, Sciences and Communication (UNIACC) in Santiago, and studied law at the University of Magallanes.

He has worked as a director and manager of media outlets, as well as an entrepreneur.

== Political career ==
In the 2017 parliamentary elections, he ran once again, being elected as an independent deputy on the «La Fuerza de la Mayoría» list under the Radical Party (PR) quota, representing the new District No. 28 (Cabo de Hornos and Antarctica, Laguna Blanca, Natales, Porvenir, Primavera, Punta Arenas, Río Verde, San Gregorio, Timaukel, Torres del Paine), in the Magallanes Region and Chilean Antarctica, for the LV legislative period of the Chilean Congress. He obtained 4,190 votes, corresponding to 7.38%.

He served on the standing committees on Science and Technology; Public works, Transport and Telecommunications; and on Extreme Zones and Chilean Antarctica. Likewise, he took part in the Special Investigative Committees on: possible irregularities in the investments and commercial activities carried out by Empresa Nacional del Petróleo (ENAP) from 2014 to 2018, and their effect on the company's current financial situation.

On public sector personnel hiring between November 2017 and March 2018; and on the acts of the Ministry of the Interior and Public Security, the Ministry of Justice and Human Rights, the Carabineros de Chile, and the Chilean Investigative Police, in connection with the so-called «Harex case», established in August 2018, of which he was elected President during the 1st Ordinary Session, on August 7, 2018.
