= District 28 (Chamber of Deputies of Chile) =

Electoral district of the Chamber of Deputies of Chile

- Distrito 28
- Electoral District for the Chamber of Deputies
- Location of District 28 within Chile
- Region: Magallanes
- Population: 166,533 (2017)
- Electorate: 158,483 (2021)
- Area: 130,482 km^{2} (2020)

Current Electoral District
- Created: 2017
- Seats: 3 (2017–present)
- Deputies: List: Carlos Bianchi (Ind); Christian Matheson (Ind); Javiera Morales (FA)

District 28 (Spanish: Distrito 28) is one of the 28 multi-member electoral districts of the Chamber of Deputies, the lower house of the National Congress, the national legislature of Chile. The district was created by the 2015 electoral reform and came into being at the following general election in 2017. It is conterminous with the region of Magallanes. The district currently elects three of the 155 members of the Chamber of Deputies using the open party-list proportional representation electoral system. At the 2021 general election the district had 158,483 registered electors.

== Electoral system ==
District 28 currently elects three of the 155 members of the Chamber of Deputies using the open party-list proportional representation electoral system. Parties may form electoral pacts with each other to pool their votes and increase their chances of winning seats. However, the number of candidates nominated by an electoral pact may not exceed the maximum number of candidates that a single party may nominate. Seats are allocated using the D'Hondt method.

== Election results ==
=== Summary ===
| Election | Apruebo Dignidad AD / FA | | | Dignidad Ahora DA | | | New Social Pact NPS / NM | | | Democratic Convergence CD | | | Chile Vamos Podemos / Vamos | | | Party of the People PDG | | | Christian Social Front FSC | | |
| Election | Votes | % | Seats | Votes | % | Seats | Votes | % | Seats | Votes | % | Seats | Votes | % | Seats | Votes | % | Seats | Votes | % | Seats |
|---|---|---|---|---|---|---|---|---|---|---|---|---|---|---|---|---|---|---|---|---|---|
| 2021 | 8,753 | 13.46% | 1 | 3,667 | 5.64% | 0 | 6,140 | 9.44% | 0 | | | | 10,517 | 16.18% | 1 | 3,590 | 5.52% | 0 | 6,003 | 9.23% | 0 |
| 2017 | 19,926 | 35.11% | 1 | | | | 11,791 | 20.77% | 1 | 7,309 | 12.88% | 0 | 16,180 | 28.51% | 1 | | | | | | |

=== Detailed ===
==== 2021 ====
Results of the 2021 general election held on 21 November 2021:

| Party | | Pact | Party | | | | | | | | | | | | | | Pact | | |
| Party | | Pact | Votes per commune | | | | | | | | | | | Total votes | % | Seats | Votes | % | Seats |
| Party | | Pact | Ant- ártica | Cabo de Hornos | Laguna Blanca | Natales | Por- venir | Prima- vera | Punta Arenas | Río Verde | San Greg- orio | Timau- kel | Torres del Paine | Total votes | % | Seats | Votes | % | Seats |
|---|---|---|---|---|---|---|---|---|---|---|---|---|---|---|---|---|---|---|---|
| Carlos Bianchi (Independent) | Ind | | 11 | 185 | 99 | 3,772 | 1,082 | 103 | 20,620 | 74 | 60 | 39 | 293 | 26,338 | 40.52% | 1 | 26,338 | 40.52% | 1 |
| Evópoli | EVO | Chile Podemos + | 2 | 69 | 73 | 435 | 158 | 28 | 6,270 | 61 | 40 | 32 | 52 | 7,220 | 11.11% | 1 | 10,517 | 16.18% | 1 |
| Independent Democratic Union | UDI | Chile Podemos + | 6 | 42 | 16 | 192 | 39 | 10 | 1,424 | 9 | 26 | 7 | 26 | 1,797 | 2.76% | 0 | 10,517 | 16.18% | 1 |
| Democratic Independent Regionalist Party | PRI | Chile Podemos + | 5 | 45 | 11 | 404 | 38 | 6 | 940 | 10 | 10 | 8 | 23 | 1,500 | 2.31% | 0 | 10,517 | 16.18% | 1 |
| Social Convergence | CS | Apruebo Dignidad | 3 | 88 | 16 | 948 | 129 | 24 | 5,695 | 17 | 4 | 0 | 59 | 6,983 | 10.74% | 1 | 8,753 | 13.46% | 1 |
| Communist Party of Chile | PC | Apruebo Dignidad | 0 | 30 | 2 | 174 | 65 | 8 | 1,458 | 5 | 11 | 8 | 9 | 1,770 | 2.72% | 0 | 8,753 | 13.46% | 1 |
| Radical Party of Chile | PR | New Social Pact | 0 | 25 | 13 | 190 | 97 | 11 | 2,874 | 9 | 12 | 9 | 14 | 3,254 | 5.01% | 0 | 6,140 | 9.44% | 0 |
| Socialist Party of Chile | PS | New Social Pact | 0 | 33 | 15 | 238 | 233 | 20 | 1,598 | 5 | 9 | 6 | 11 | 2,168 | 3.33% | 0 | 6,140 | 9.44% | 0 |
| Christian Democratic Party | PDC | New Social Pact | 2 | 20 | 2 | 79 | 17 | 10 | 579 | 1 | 5 | 0 | 3 | 718 | 1.10% | 0 | 6,140 | 9.44% | 0 |
| Christian Conservative Party | PCC | Christian Social Front | 6 | 44 | 4 | 298 | 77 | 8 | 2,585 | 4 | 7 | 12 | 12 | 3,057 | 4.70% | 0 | 6,003 | 9.23% | 0 |
| Republican Party | REP | Christian Social Front | 2 | 59 | 14 | 201 | 62 | 6 | 2,562 | 16 | 10 | 4 | 10 | 2,946 | 4.53% | 0 | 6,003 | 9.23% | 0 |
| Humanist Party | PH | Dignidad Ahora | 1 | 43 | 10 | 141 | 26 | 10 | 3,396 | 11 | 10 | 6 | 13 | 3,667 | 5.64% | 0 | 3,667 | 5.64% | 0 |
| Party of the People | PDG | | 4 | 55 | 10 | 379 | 93 | 32 | 2,948 | 11 | 19 | 14 | 25 | 3,590 | 5.52% | 0 | 3,590 | 5.52% | 0 |
| Valid votes | | | 42 | 738 | 285 | 7,451 | 2,116 | 276 | 52,949 | 233 | 223 | 145 | 550 | 65,008 | 100.00% | 3 | 65,008 | 100.00% | 3 |
| Blank votes | | | 4 | 96 | 17 | 515 | 136 | 24 | 1,872 | 15 | 13 | 21 | 37 | 2,750 | 3.93% | | | | |
| Rejected votes – other | | | 1 | 44 | 4 | 319 | 75 | 12 | 1,750 | 8 | 13 | 5 | 20 | 2,251 | 3.22% | | | | |
| Total polled | | | 47 | 878 | 306 | 8,285 | 2,327 | 312 | 56,571 | 256 | 249 | 171 | 607 | 70,009 | 44.17% | | | | |
| Registered electors | | | 233 | 1,862 | 822 | 22,672 | 6,108 | 1,229 | 121,724 | 750 | 715 | 734 | 1,634 | 158,483 | | | | | |
| Turnout | | | 20.17% | 47.15% | 37.23% | 36.54% | 38.10% | 25.39% | 46.47% | 34.13% | 34.83% | 23.30% | 37.15% | 44.17% | | | | | |

The following candidates were elected: Carlos Bianchi (Ind), 26,338 votes; Christian Matheson (EVO), 7,220 votes; and Javiera Morales (CS), 4,563 votes.

==== 2017 ====
Results of the 2017 general election held on 19 November 2017:

| Party | | Pact | Party | | | | | | | | | | | | | | Pact | | |
| Party | | Pact | Votes per commune | | | | | | | | | | | Total votes | % | Seats | Votes | % | Seats |
| Party | | Pact | Ant- ártica | Cabo de Hornos | Laguna Blanca | Natales | Por- venir | Prima- vera | Punta Arenas | Río Verde | San Greg- orio | Timau- kel | Torres del Paine | Total votes | % | Seats | Votes | % | Seats |
|---|---|---|---|---|---|---|---|---|---|---|---|---|---|---|---|---|---|---|---|
| Humanist Party | PH | Broad Front | 9 | 240 | 75 | 1,778 | 431 | 80 | 17,036 | 41 | 79 | 38 | 119 | 19,926 | 35.11% | 1 | 19,926 | 35.11% | 1 |
| Independent Democratic Union | UDI | Chile Vamos | 8 | 61 | 70 | 496 | 129 | 27 | 5,890 | 64 | 41 | 58 | 27 | 6,871 | 12.11% | 1 | 16,180 | 28.51% | 1 |
| National Renewal | RN | Chile Vamos | 5 | 70 | 26 | 1,623 | 38 | 14 | 2,811 | 15 | 16 | 6 | 186 | 4,810 | 8.47% | 0 | 16,180 | 28.51% | 1 |
| Independent Regionalist Party | PRI | Chile Vamos | 3 | 55 | 32 | 292 | 403 | 29 | 3,328 | 24 | 18 | 11 | 25 | 4,220 | 7.43% | 0 | 16,180 | 28.51% | 1 |
| Evópoli | EVO | Chile Vamos | 2 | 5 | 0 | 38 | 9 | 2 | 217 | 0 | 3 | 1 | 2 | 279 | 0.49% | 0 | 16,180 | 28.51% | 1 |
| Social Democrat Radical Party | PRSD | Nueva Mayoría | 1 | 11 | 14 | 1,084 | 307 | 3 | 2,683 | 12 | 2 | 13 | 60 | 4,190 | 7.38% | 1 | 11,791 | 20.77% | 1 |
| Socialist Party of Chile | PS | Nueva Mayoría | 0 | 19 | 21 | 425 | 202 | 22 | 3,063 | 14 | 6 | 10 | 25 | 3,807 | 6.71% | 0 | 11,791 | 20.77% | 1 |
| Party for Democracy | PPD | Nueva Mayoría | 0 | 87 | 24 | 173 | 65 | 7 | 2,097 | 6 | 8 | 10 | 2 | 2,479 | 4.37% | 0 | 11,791 | 20.77% | 1 |
| Communist Party of Chile | PC | Nueva Mayoría | 0 | 3 | 1 | 101 | 16 | 7 | 1,169 | 4 | 9 | 2 | 3 | 1,315 | 2.32% | 0 | 11,791 | 20.77% | 1 |
| Christian Democratic Party | PDC | Democratic Convergence | 2 | 78 | 24 | 665 | 189 | 63 | 6,136 | 34 | 50 | 11 | 57 | 7,309 | 12.88% | 0 | 7,309 | 12.88% | 0 |
| Patagonian Regional Democracy | DRP | Green Regionalist Coalition | 2 | 20 | 10 | 309 | 36 | 3 | 1,141 | 6 | 5 | 4 | 17 | 1,553 | 2.74% | 0 | 1,553 | 2.74% | 0 |
| Valid votes | | | 32 | 649 | 297 | 6,984 | 1,825 | 257 | 45,571 | 220 | 237 | 164 | 523 | 56,759 | 100.00% | 3 | 56,759 | 100.00% | 3 |
| Blank votes | | | 2 | 52 | 10 | 328 | 124 | 22 | 1,223 | 8 | 13 | 17 | 20 | 1,819 | 2.98% | | | | |
| Rejected votes – other | | | 3 | 31 | 6 | 279 | 93 | 10 | 1,980 | 8 | 8 | 10 | 15 | 2,443 | 4.00% | | | | |
| Total polled | | | 37 | 732 | 313 | 7,591 | 2,042 | 289 | 48,774 | 236 | 258 | 191 | 558 | 61,021 | 38.59% | | | | |
| Registered electors | | | 327 | 1,943 | 944 | 21,392 | 6,183 | 1,416 | 121,321 | 825 | 1,072 | 974 | 1,747 | 158,144 | | | | | |
| Turnout | | | 11.31% | 37.67% | 33.16% | 35.49% | 33.03% | 20.41% | 40.20% | 28.61% | 24.07% | 19.61% | 31.94% | 38.59% | | | | | |

The following candidates were elected: Sandra Amar (UDI), 6,871 votes; Karim Bianchi (PRSD), 4,190 votes; and Gabriel Boric (PH), 18,626 votes.
