= Tehuelche =

Tehuelche or Tehuelches may refer to:

- Tehuelche people of Patagonia
- Tehuelche language, an extinct language once spoken by the Tehuelche people
- Tehuelche (motorcycle), produced in Argentina from 1957 to 1964
- IA 51 Tehuelche single engined light utility aircraft, developed in the late 1950s in Argentina
- El Tehuelche Airport, Chubut province, Argentina, served by two commercial airlines and base of the local flying club
- Tehuelches Department, Chubut Province, Argentina
- Villa Tehuelches, a village in Magallanes Province, Chile
