= Villa Tehuelches =

- Village
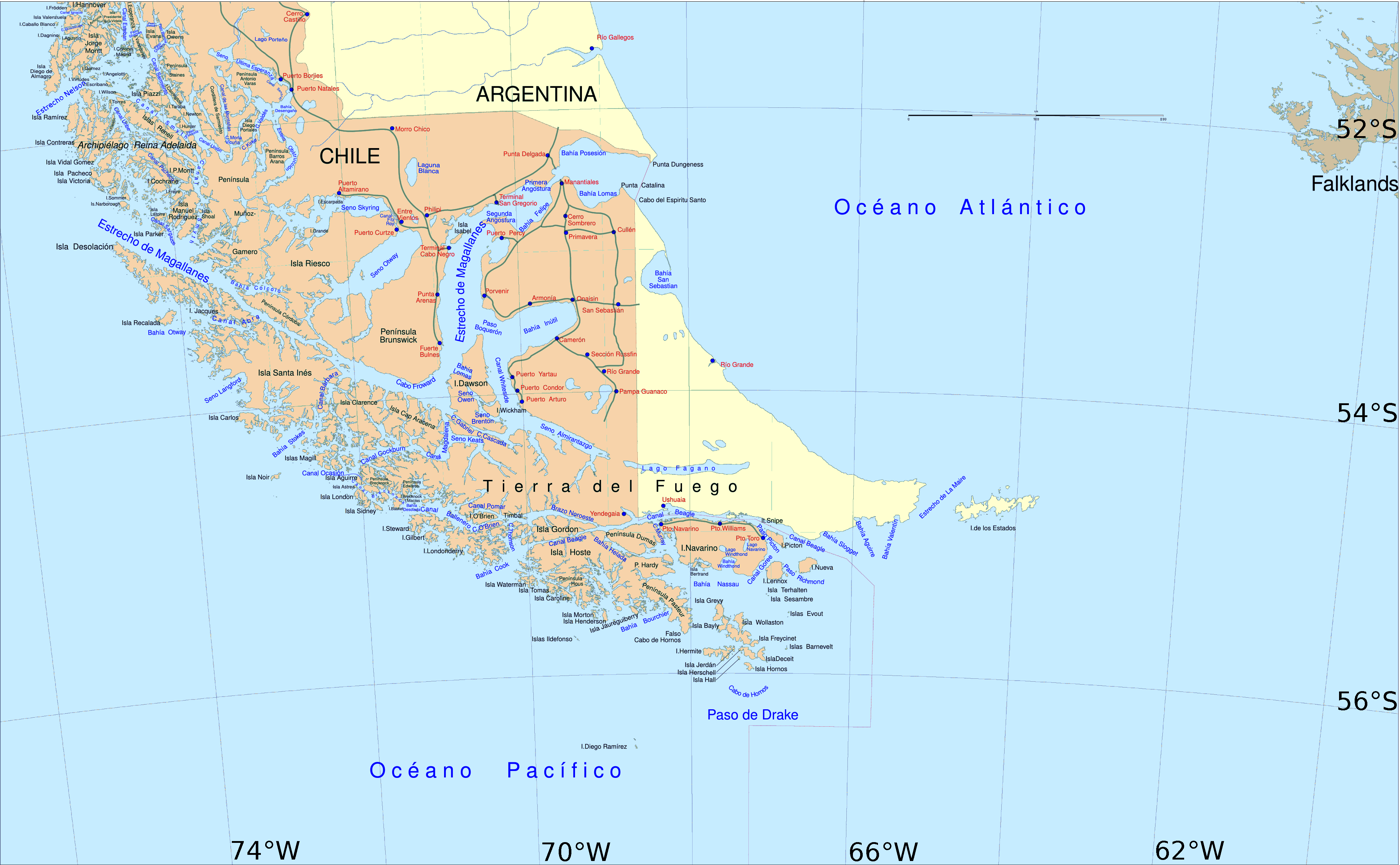

- Location of the Laguna Blanca commune in the Magallanes Region
- Country: Chile
- Region: Magallanes
- Province: Magallanes
- Commune: Laguna Blanca
- Founded: 30 December 1927 (as "Morro Chico")

Population
  - Total: 151
- Area code: 56 +
- Climate: Cfc

Villa Tehuelches is a Chilean village (pop. 151) and capital of the commune (Spanish: comuna) of Laguna Blanca in the Magallanes Province, Magallanes and Antartica Chilena Region. This area of Patagonian plains (Quechua: pampas) is suitable for livestock and the breeding of sheep.

== History ==
The municipality was created on 30 December 1927 with the original name of Morro Chico, and was renamed following the reformulation of borders in Decree No. 2868, 26.10.1979.

== Community activities ==
The village offers educational services with a school named "Diego Portales". The director of the school also administers the internship for students coming from different regions, both of Laguna Blanca as other municipalities and provinces (Punta Arenas, Río Verde, Chile, Puerto Aysén, Puerto Natales)

The village has access to emergency health care through a first aid post.

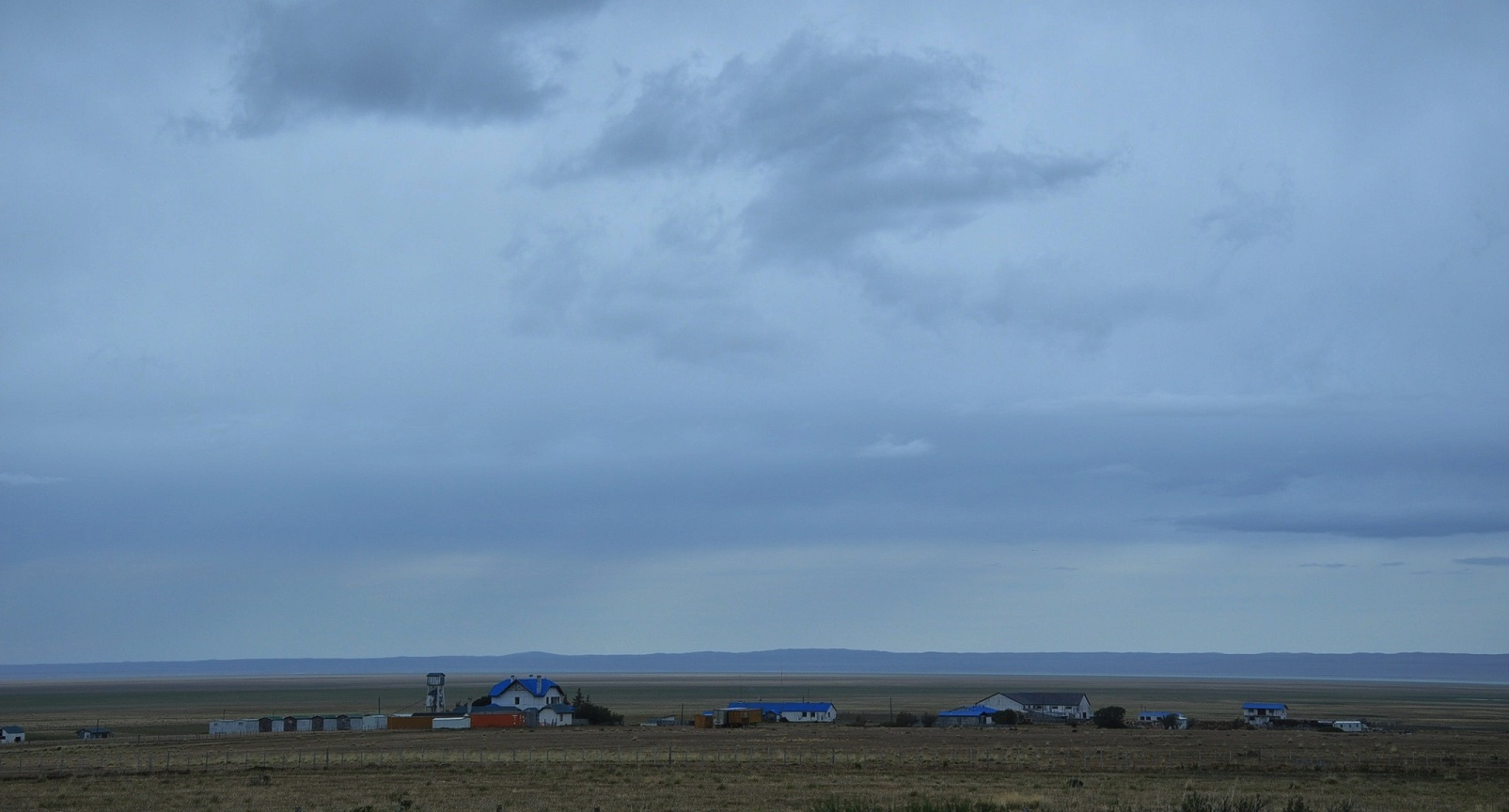
An estancia (large ranch) in the Comune of Laguna Blanca, just south of Villa Tehuelches, with the Laguna Blanca in the distance (the lake on the right, faintly visible).
