= Chile Route Y-50 =

Highway in Chile

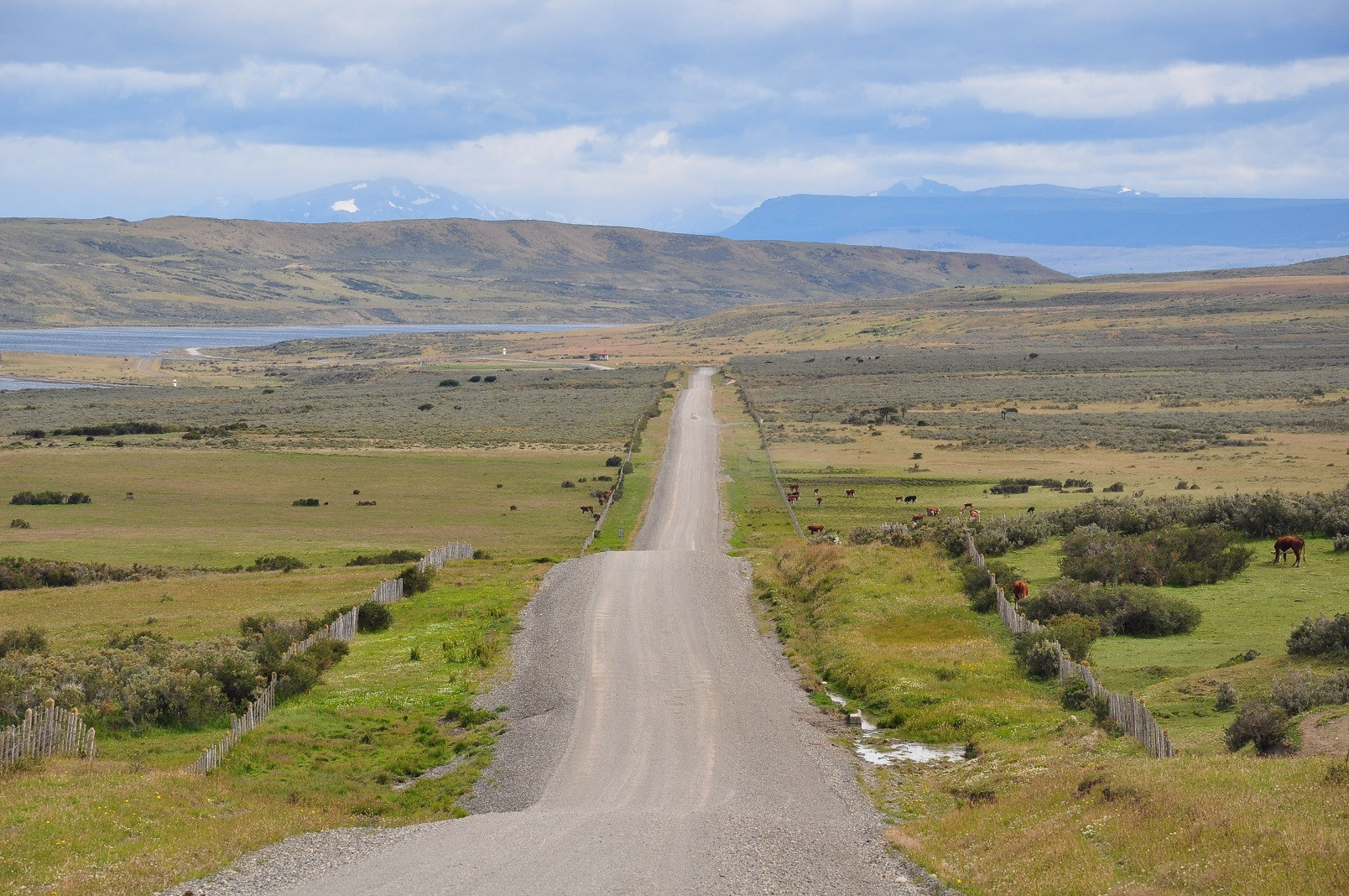
- Route Y-50 crossing Patagonian grasslands near Riesco Island and Fitz Roy Channel.

Location
- Country: Chile

Highway system
- Highways in Chile

Route Y-50 (9-CH) is a primary regional road in Magallanes Province, southernmost Chile. The road runs from Chile Route 9 to Estancia Río Verde on the shores of Skyring Sound.
