= Ambassador (clipper) =

British tea clipper built in 1869

Coordinates: 52°34′03″S 70°04′07″W

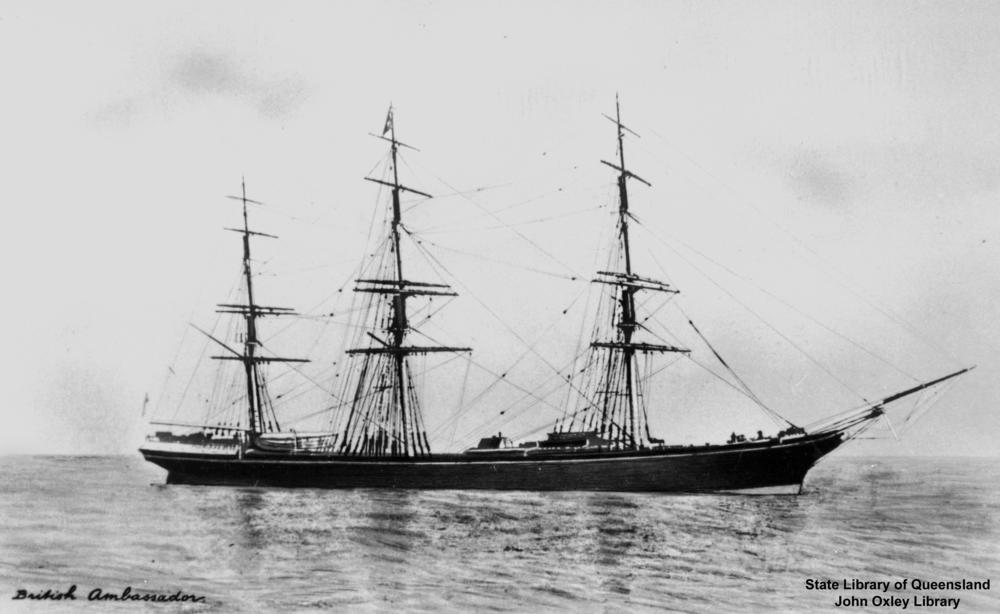
- Ambassador

History

United Kingdom
- Name: Ambassador
- Owner: W. Lund & Co
- Builder: William Walker, Lavender Dry Dock, London
- Launched: 1869
- Out of service: 1896
- Status: Condemned 1895; beached & abandoned hulk

General characteristics
- Class & type: Composite clipper
- Tonnage: 692 GRT
- Length: 176.0 ft (53.6 m)
- Beam: 31.3 ft (9.5 m)
- Depth: 19.1 ft (5.8 m)
- Sail plan: fully rigged ship (from 1869); barque(from 1874)

Ambassador is a United Kingdom tea clipper built in 1869. She was a composite clipper, built with wooden planking over an iron skeleton and was W. Lund & Co's first tea clipper. She is now a beached wreck in southern Chile.

== History ==
William Walker built Ambassador at Lavender Dry Dock in London.

Though considered a fast ship, Ambassador was said to be "very cranky and overmasted". Her first passage to the UK from Fuzhou came during the Tea Race of 1870 under Captain Duggan and took 115 days, a mediocre performance; that same year the fastest tea passage, also from Fuzhou, was made by the clipper Lahloo in just 98 days. Ambassador's fastest passage between China and England was 108 days, in 1872.

Ambassador has been beached at Estancia San Gregorio, Chile since 1899. In 1973 Chile declared her a historic monument.

The wreck is now reduced to a skeletal frame.

== See also ==
Better preserved composite ship constructions include:

- City of Adelaide (1864), passenger clipper relocated from Scotland to Adelaide in 2014
- Cutty Sark (1869), tea-clipper in Greenwich, England
- HMS Gannet (1878), a Naval sloop in Chatham, England
- PS Oscar W (1908), a paddle steamer at Goolwa on the River Murray, South Australia
