= Tehuelche (motorcycle) =

Brand

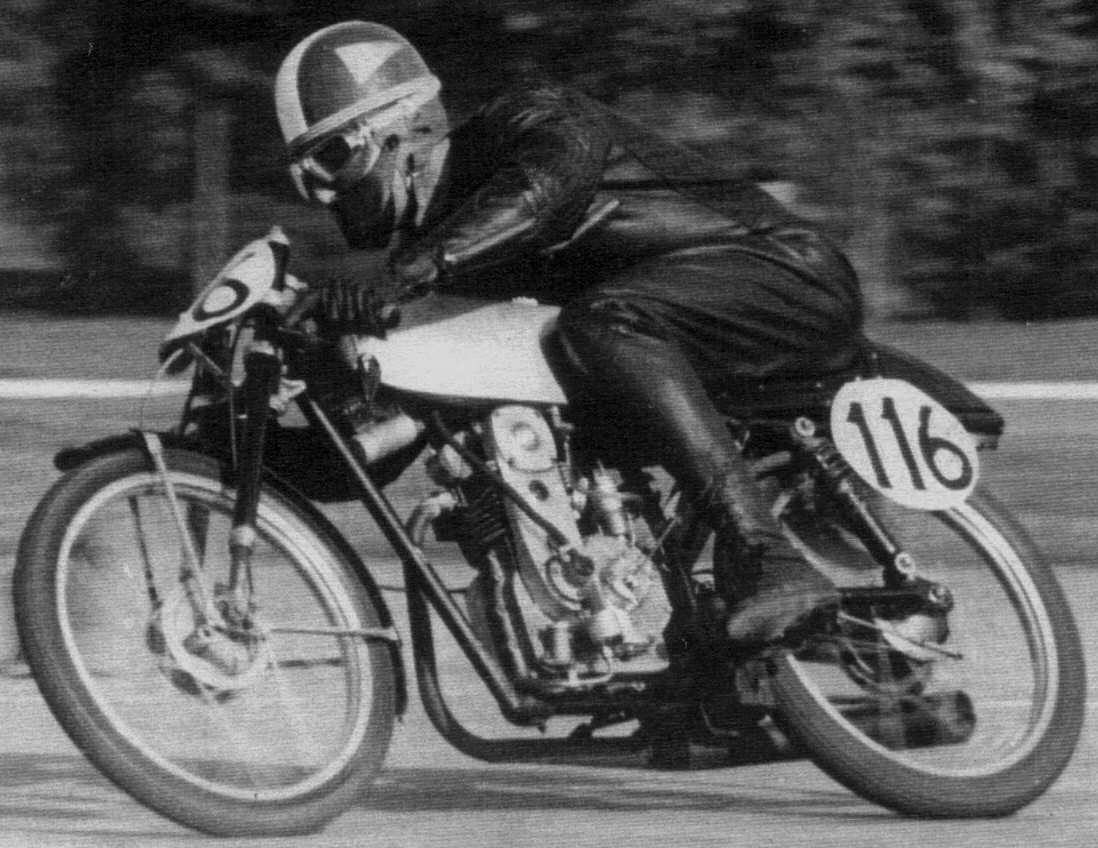
Tehuelche with Alberto Gomez 1964.

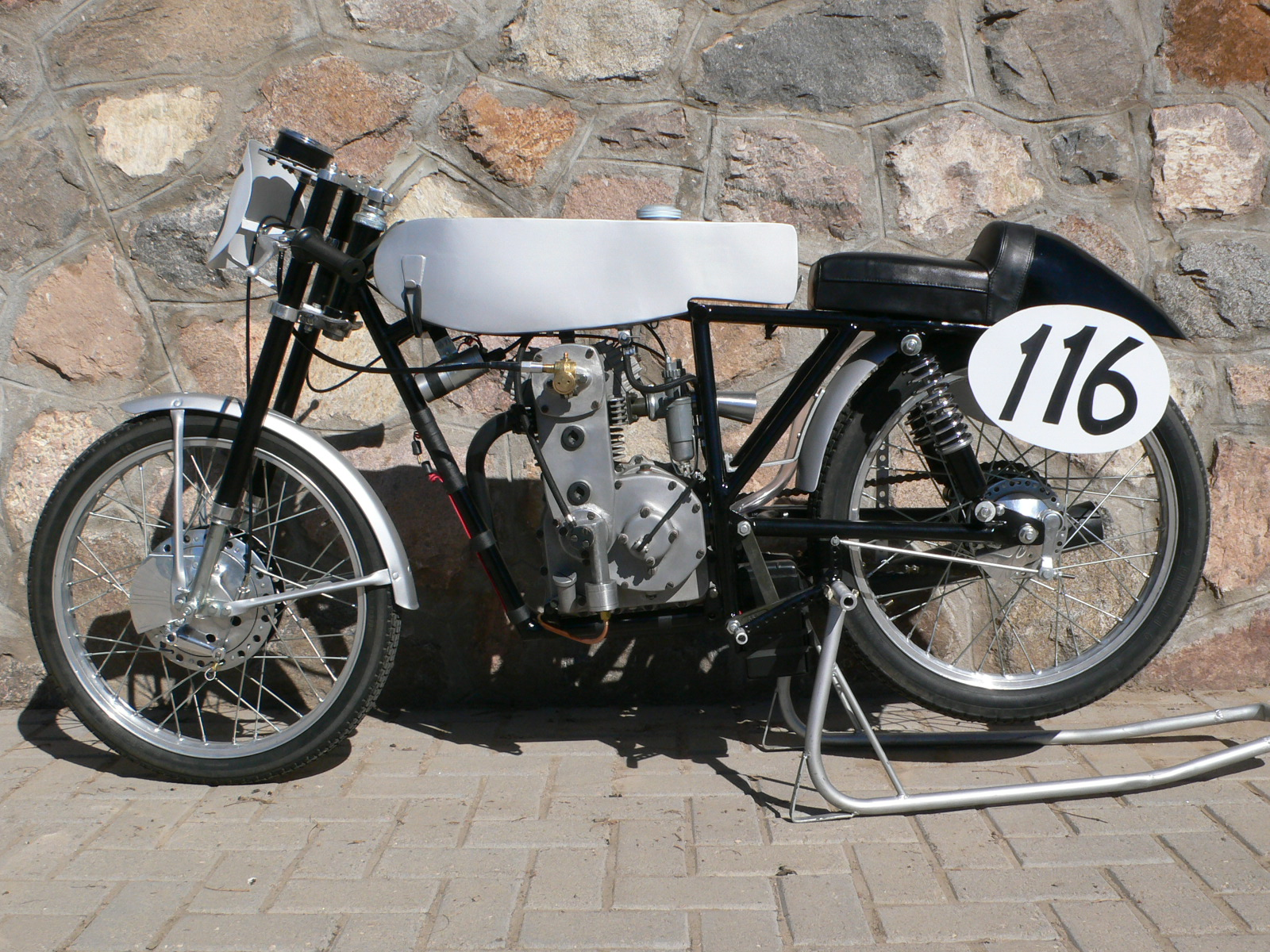
Restored Gomez motorcycle

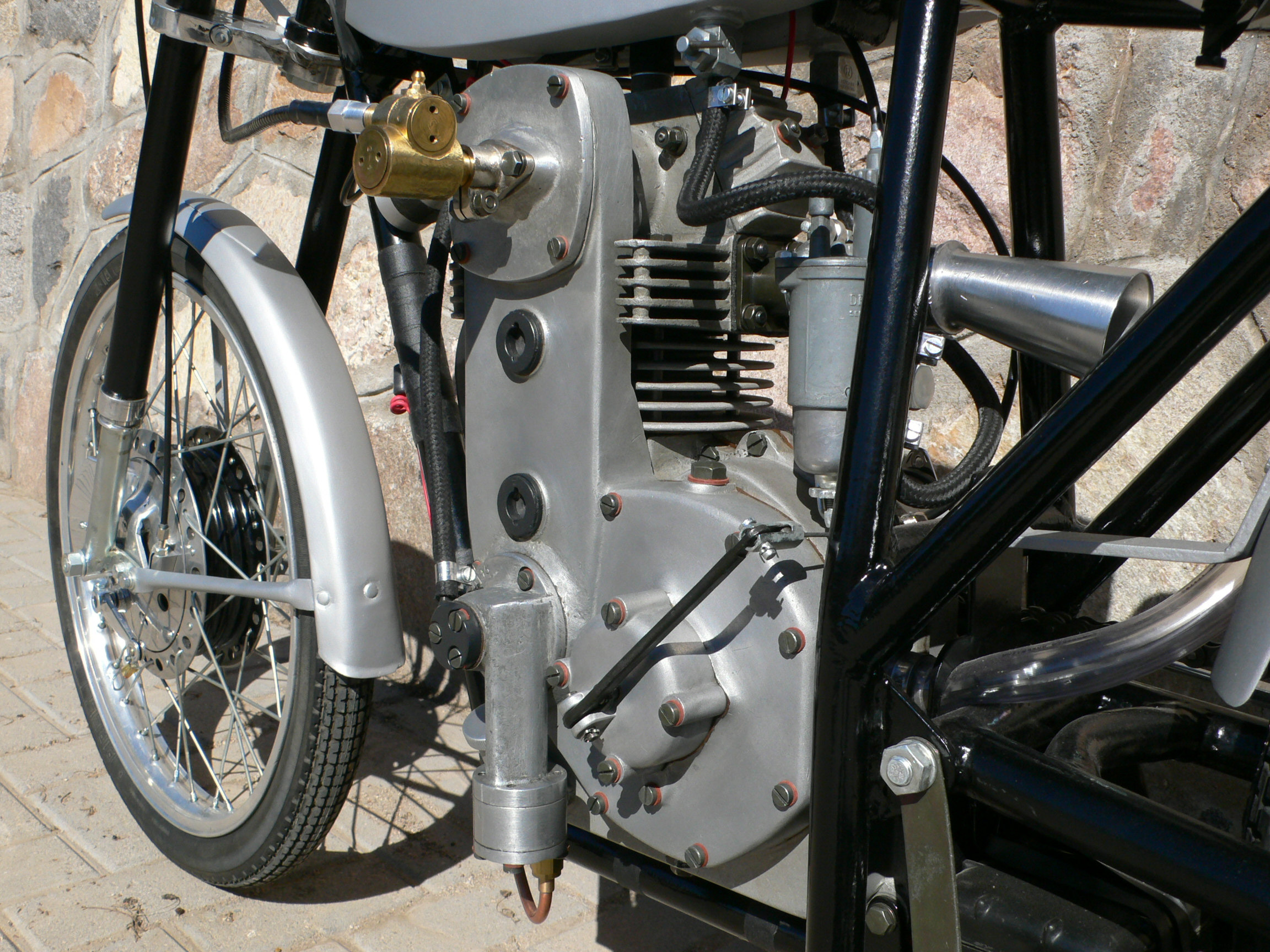
Engine detail

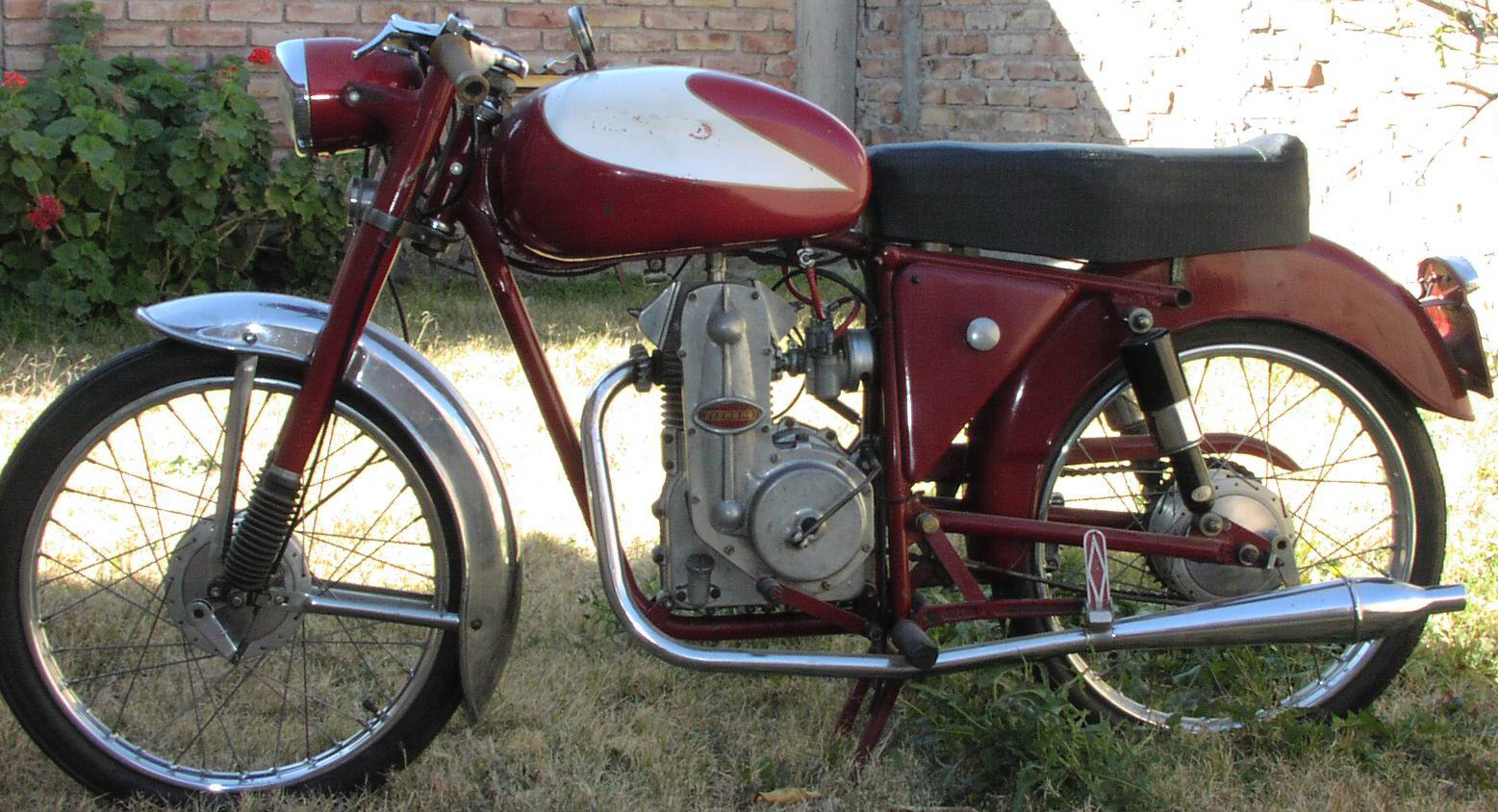
Legnano with Tehuelche engine- single overhead cam with chain drive distribution

Tehuelche was an Argentine motorcycle that was produced between March 1957 and 1964.

The Tehuelche was the only motorcycle that was mass-produced continuously in Argentina, where it was produced for seven years.

The Tehuelche competed with the Puma Primera and Puma Segunda (from Guericke), the Zanella (from Ceccato), and the Gilera. The Tehuelche distinguished itself not only by the characteristic sound of its gear train (SOHC engine) but also by its racing performance.

== Design ==
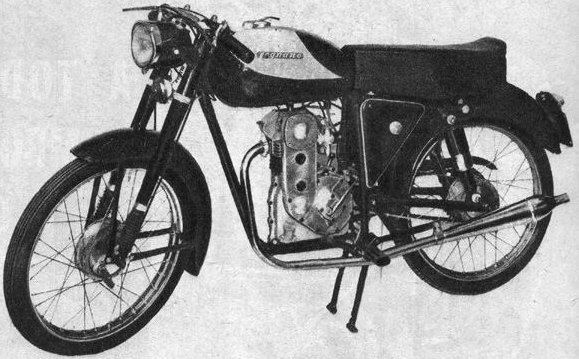
Legnano with Tehuelche engine- single overhead cam with gear drive distribution

The creators of the Tehuelche were Juan Raffaldi and Roberto Fattorini. The two men moved to Argentina from Italy in 1949, specifically for this project.

In 1955, Juan Raffaldi designed the engine. It was a four-stroke engine of 50 cc displacement (single overhead camshaft- SOHC). This design was a little unusual for its time; up until then, it had been used primarily in racing motorcycles. Furthermore, it had no oil pump and it was made totally out of aluminum.

== Manufacture ==
Raffaldi and Fattorini, along with several other partners, started mass-producing the Tehuelche. They raised the engine capacity to 75 cc to enter a new market category. This first partnership barely lasted two years, during which just over 1,200 motorcycles were produced.

Raffaldi and Fattorini started another partnership with new members, continuing production until the middle of 1964. This partnership secured importation rights for Italian Legnano motorcycles and manufactured approximately 3,500 motorcycles, bringing the total number of Tehuelches ever produced to almost 5,000.

== The models ==
In its almost seven years of manufacture, some of the colors and the decals of the Tehuelche were changed.

In 1962, two models were produced: the Sport and the Super Sport, the latter bearing a speedometer. In addition, since the second partnership had the right to import Legnano motorcycles from Italy, they introduced a model of the Tehuelche called the “Legnano,” hoping to increase sales.

This model appeared on the market with a different gas tank and painted red and white. Finally, in 1964, toward the end of production, the camshaft that had been driven by gears was changed to a chain drive camshaft.

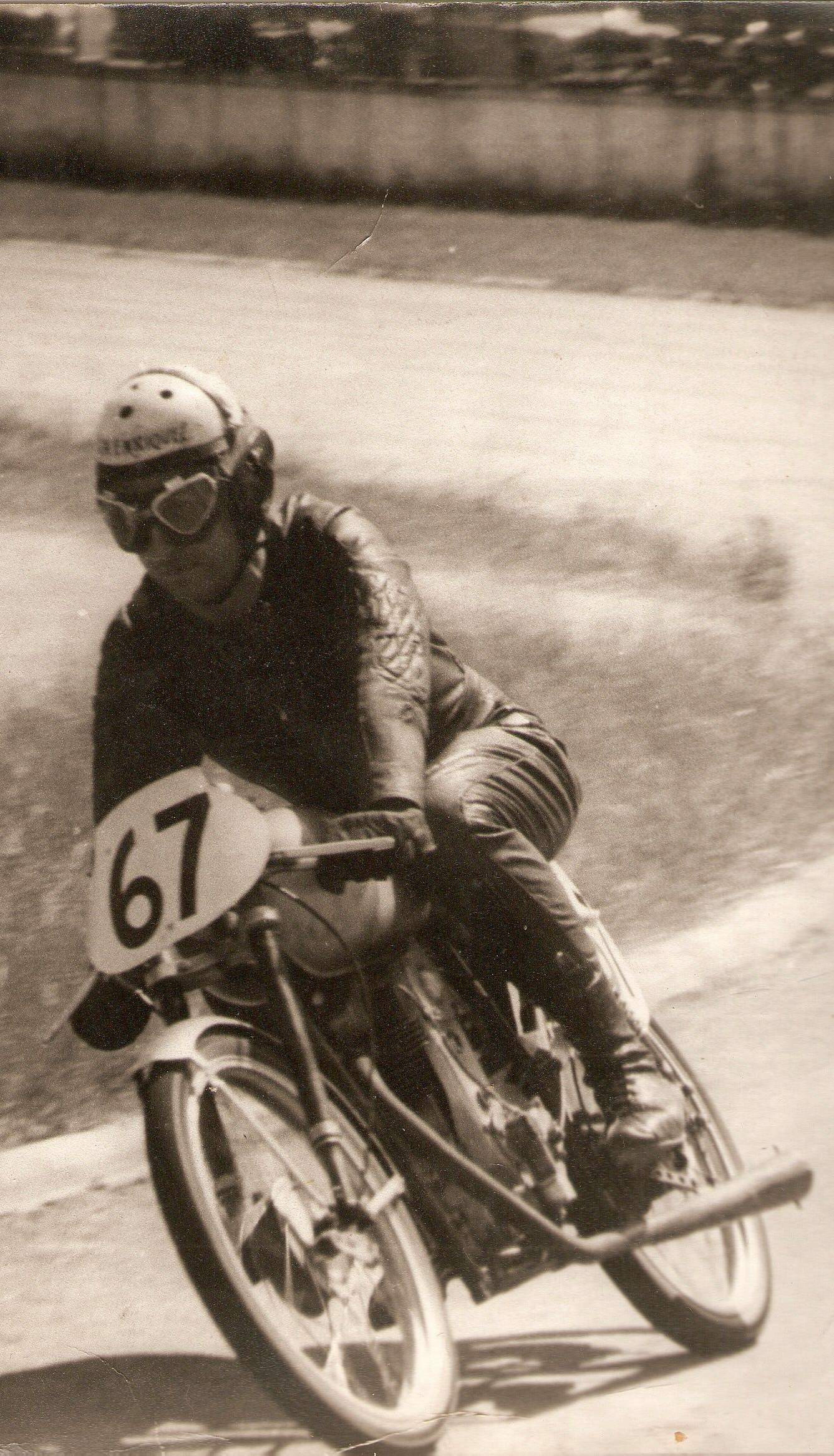
Tehuelche with Jaime Enriquez 1963

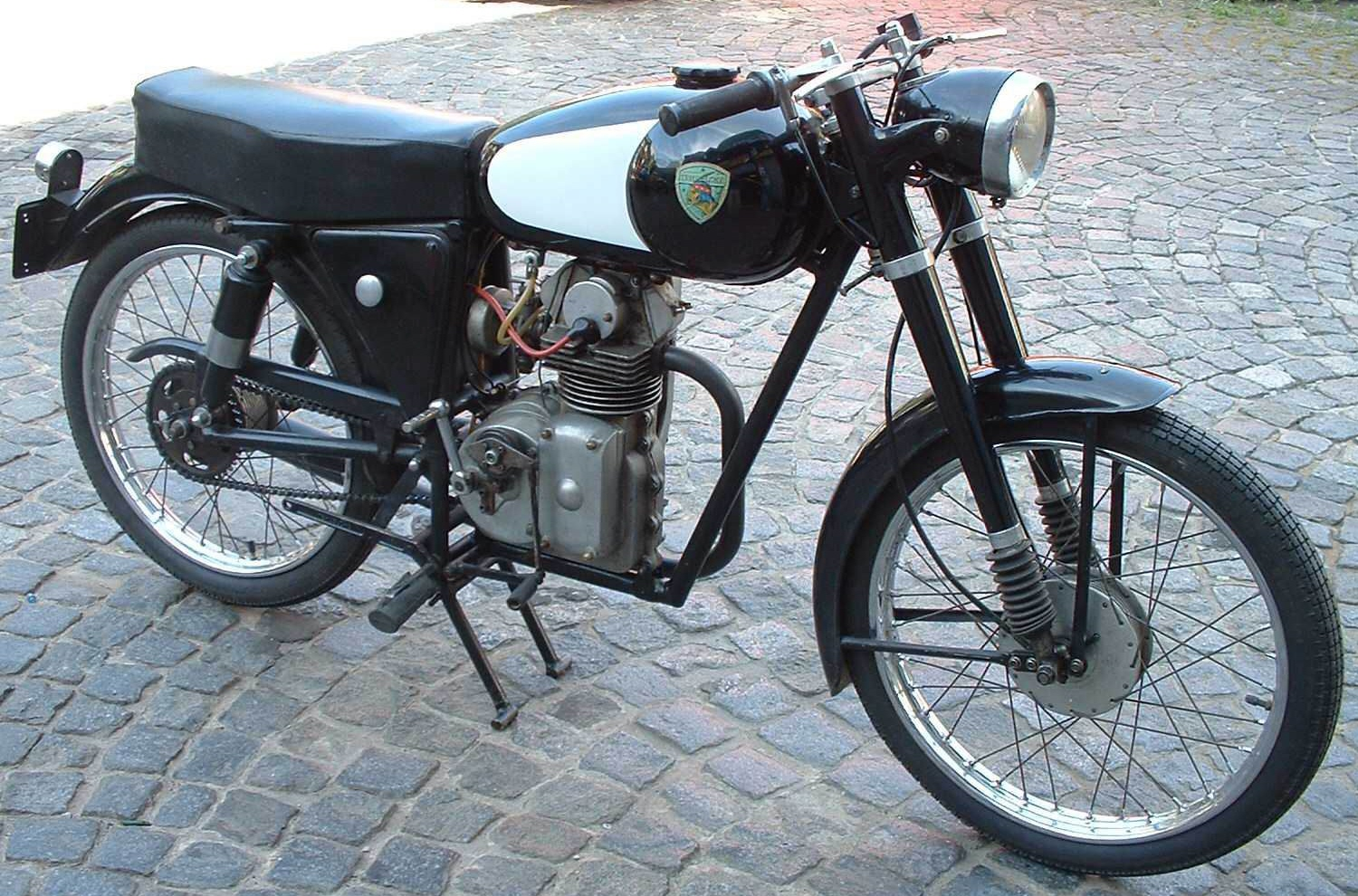
Tehuelche 1957 model

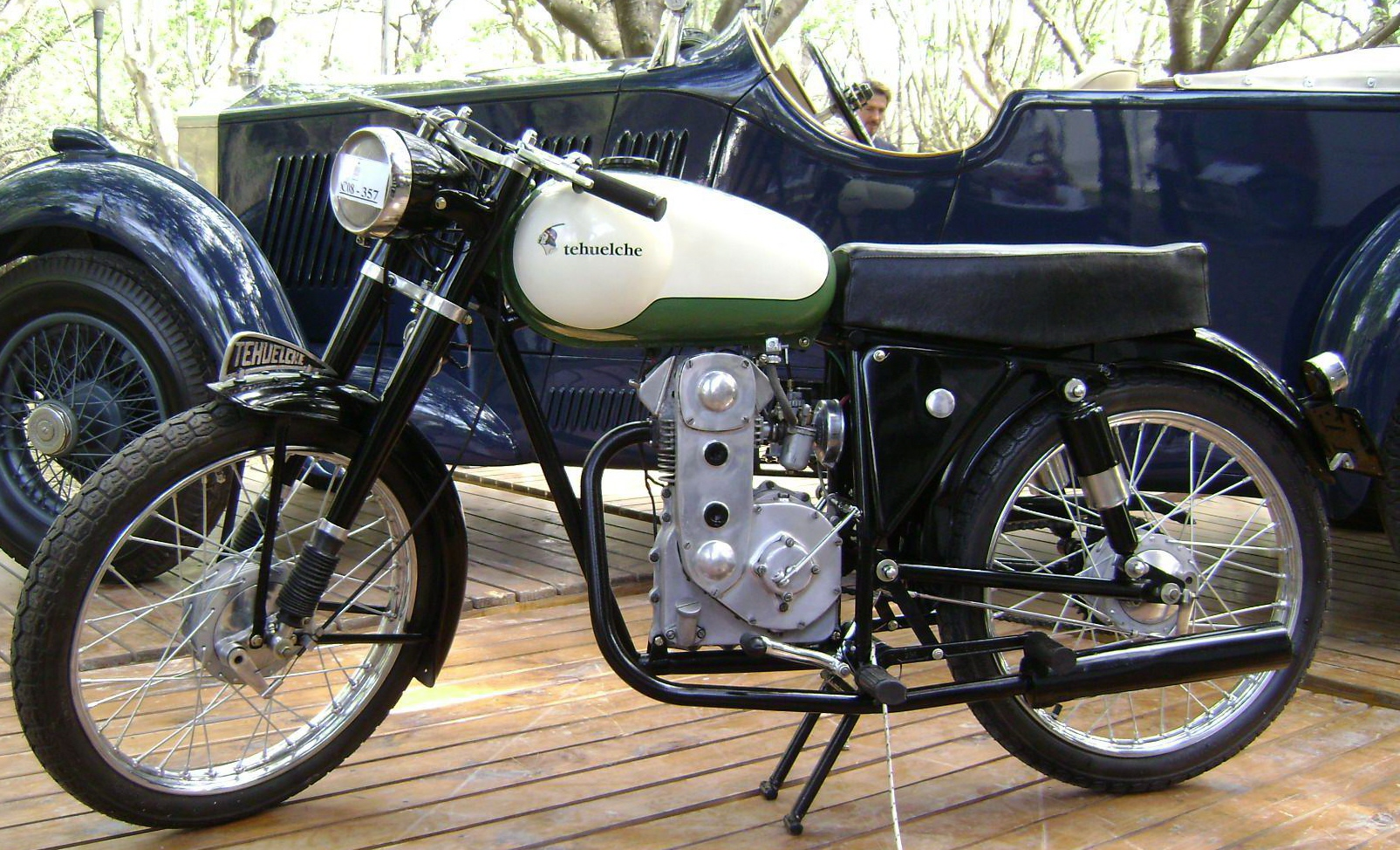
Tehuelche 1960 model

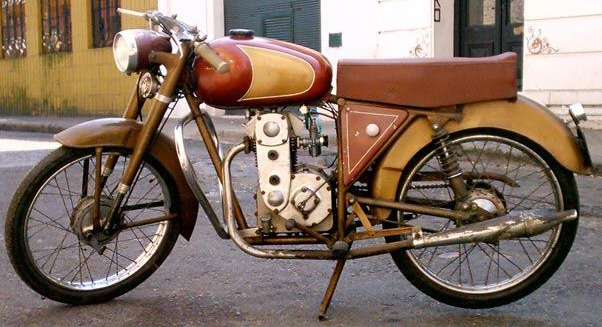
Tehuelche Super Sport 1963

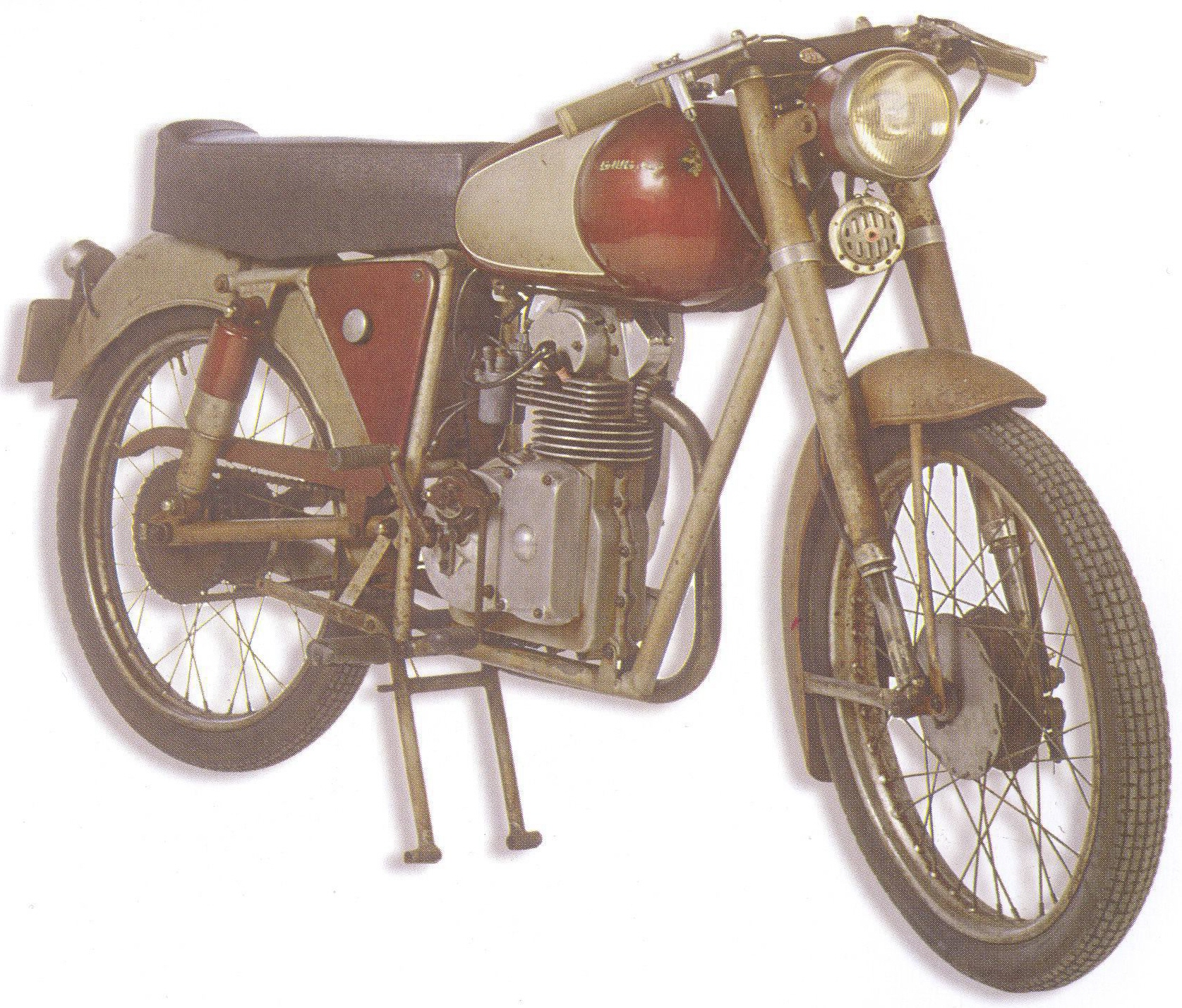
Tehuelche Super Sport 1963 model

== End of production ==
In 1964, Raffaldi and Fattorini decided to abandon the Tehuelche. Hyperinflation and government instability in Argentina made it difficult for them to continue.

== Technical characteristics ==
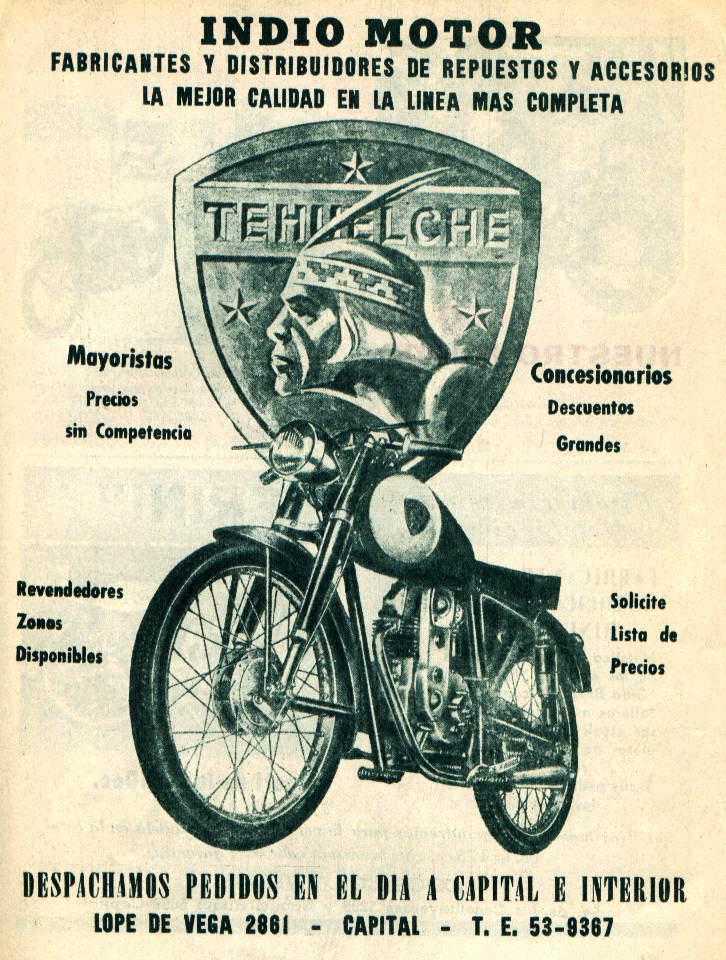
Tehuelche ad 1957

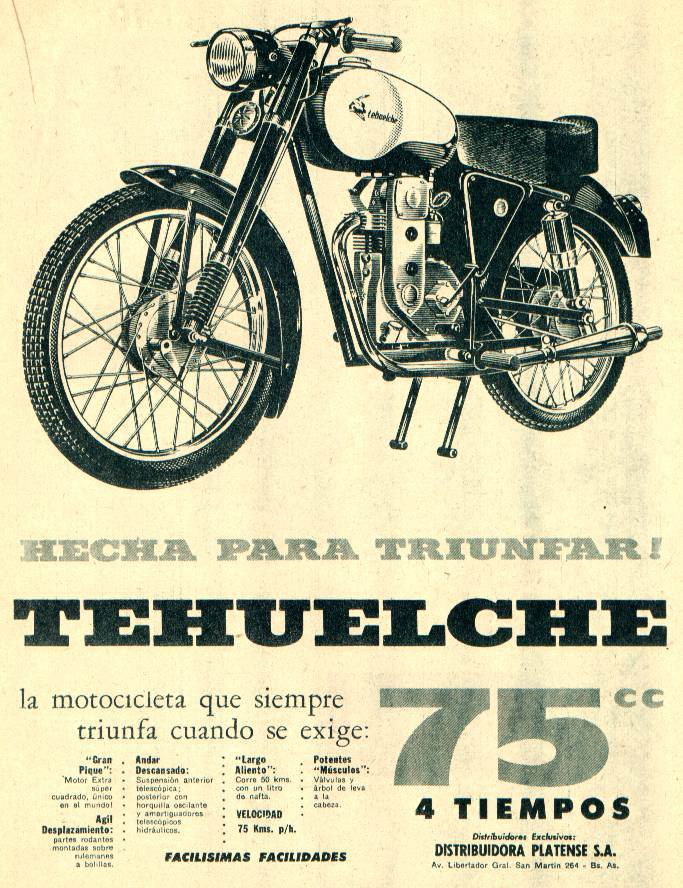
Tehuelche ad 1960

- Engine: Four-stroke
  - Cooling: Air
  - Bore: 48 mm
  - Stroke: 41 mm
  - Capacity: 75 cc
  - Compression ratio: 6.5:1
  - Power: 4,75 hp
  - RPM at maximum power: 6500
  - Approximate consumption: 1 liter of gasoline per 50 km
  - Distribution: Single overhead camshaft (SOHC)
  - Valves: Two valves arranged in a 90° configuration, operated through rocker arms.
- Lubrication: Wet sump, splash lubrication. A hook, attached onto the connecting rod, dips into the oil in the sump and splashes it around the inside of the engine.
  - Oil capacity: 1/2 L (0.11 imp gal; 0.13 US gal)
- Clutch: Mono-disc in oil bath
- Gearbox: Three-speed
  - Gear ratios:
    - 1st gear: 2.628
    - 2nd gear: 1.542
    - 3rd gear: 1
  - Speed relations:
    - 1st speed: 28 km/h
    - 2nd speed: 48 km/h
    - 3rd speed: 74 km/h
- Carburetion: Dellorto MA16 carburetor, made under license in Argentina.
  - Diffuser diameter: 16 mm
  - High Speed Jet: #70
  - Idle Jet: #30
  - Sprayer: 260
- Frame: Chassis made out of welded steel tubes
  - Wheels: Steel rims, 18 by 1 3/8 inches (457 mm × 35 mm)
  - Tires (front and rear): 18 by 2 1/4 inches (457 mm × 57 mm)
  - Tire pressure:
    - Front: 22 lbf/in^{2} (150 kPa; 1.5 kgf/cm^{2})
    - Rear: 28 lbf/in^{2} (190 kPa; 2.0 kgf/cm^{2})
- Weight: 66 kg
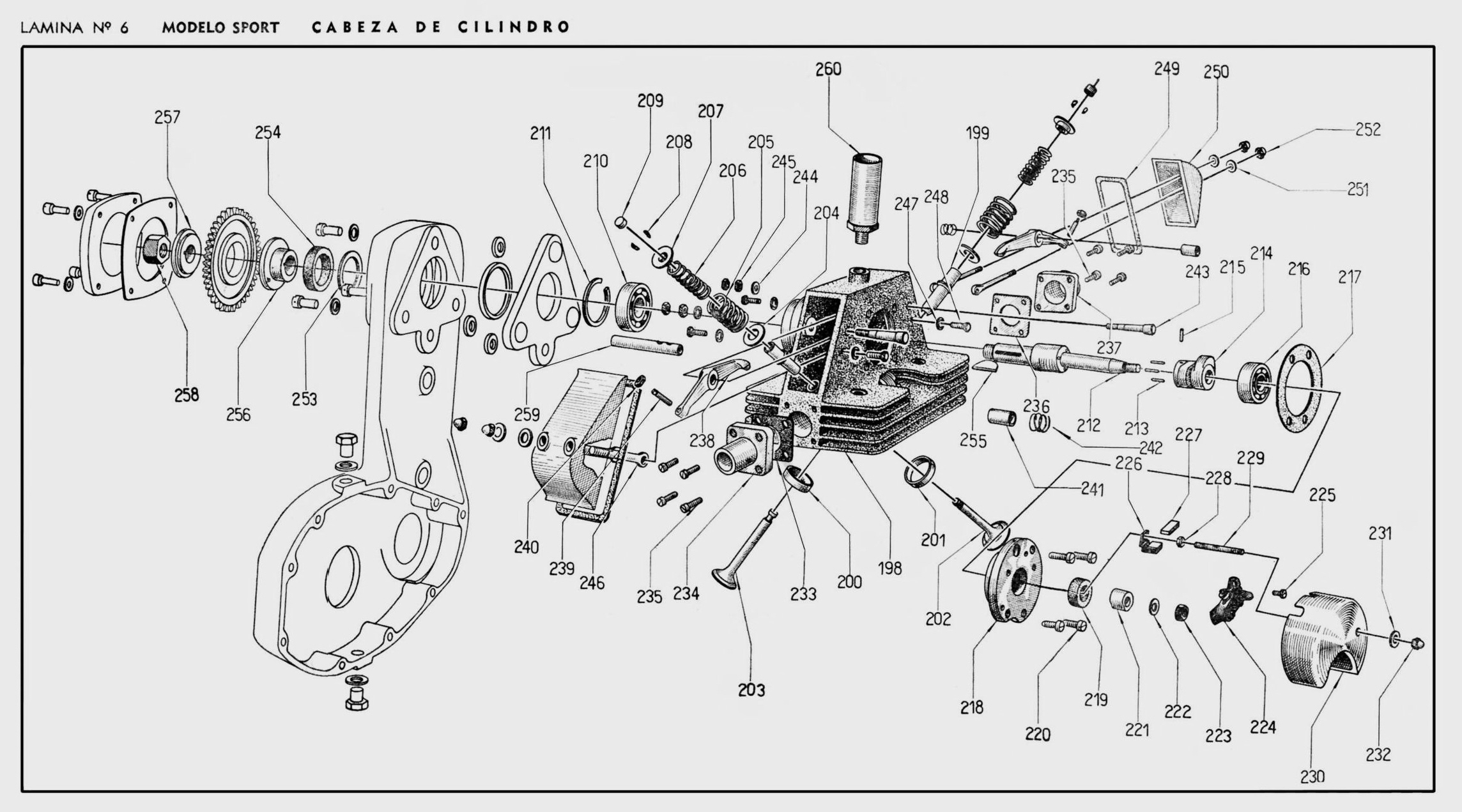
Tehuelche cylinder head blueprint

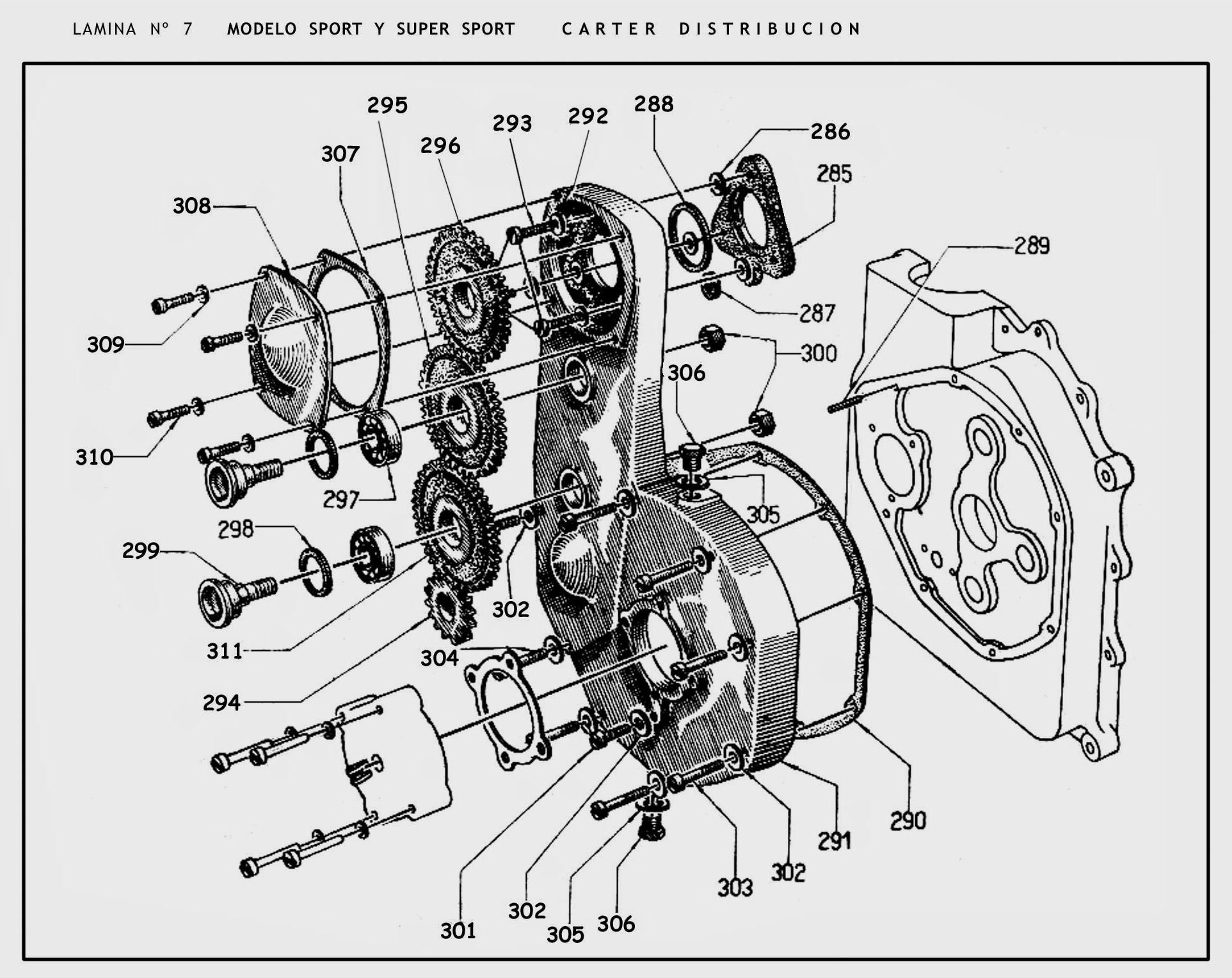
Tehuelche camshaft gear distribution blueprint

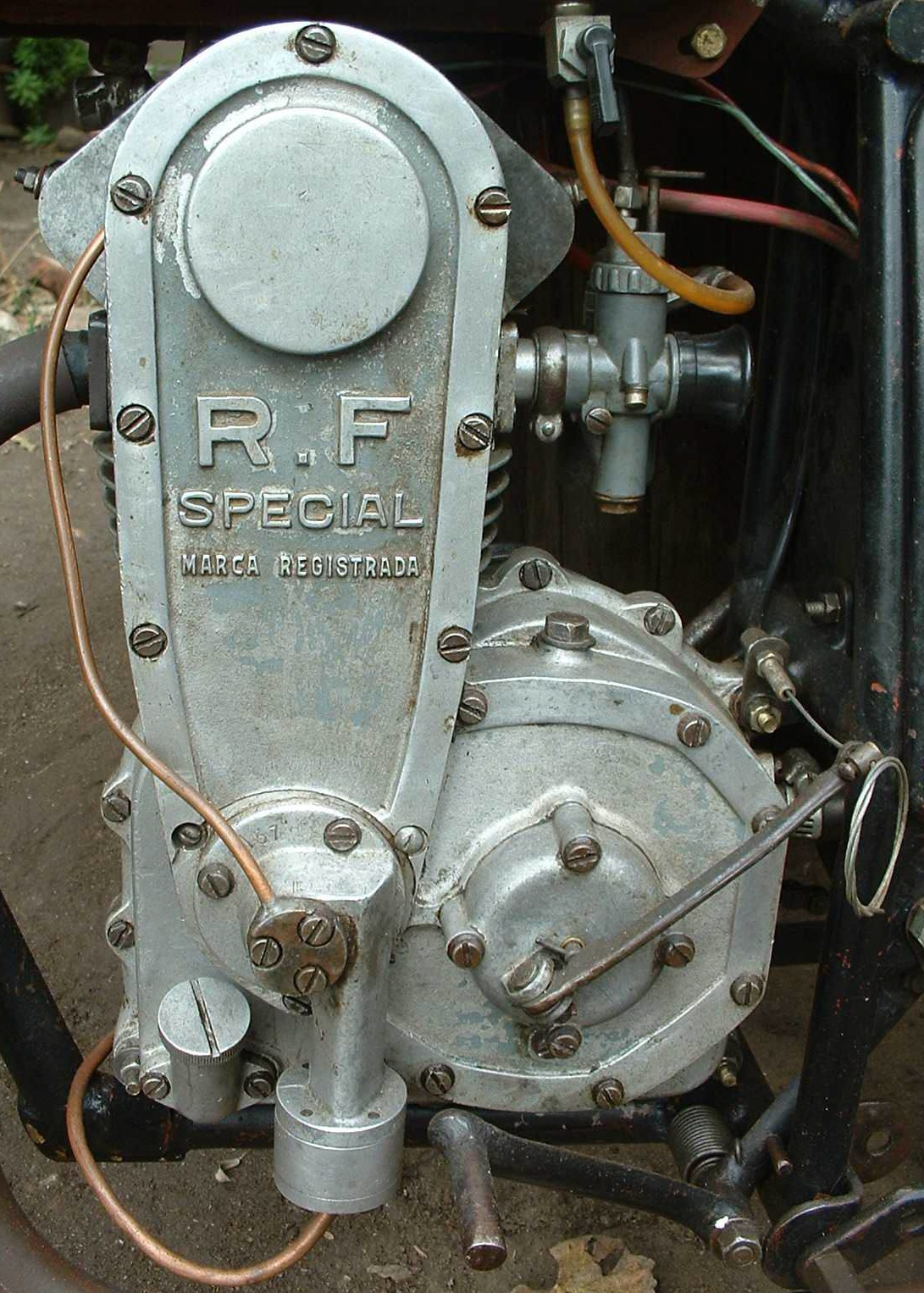
Tehuelche single overhead cam with chain drive and oil pump

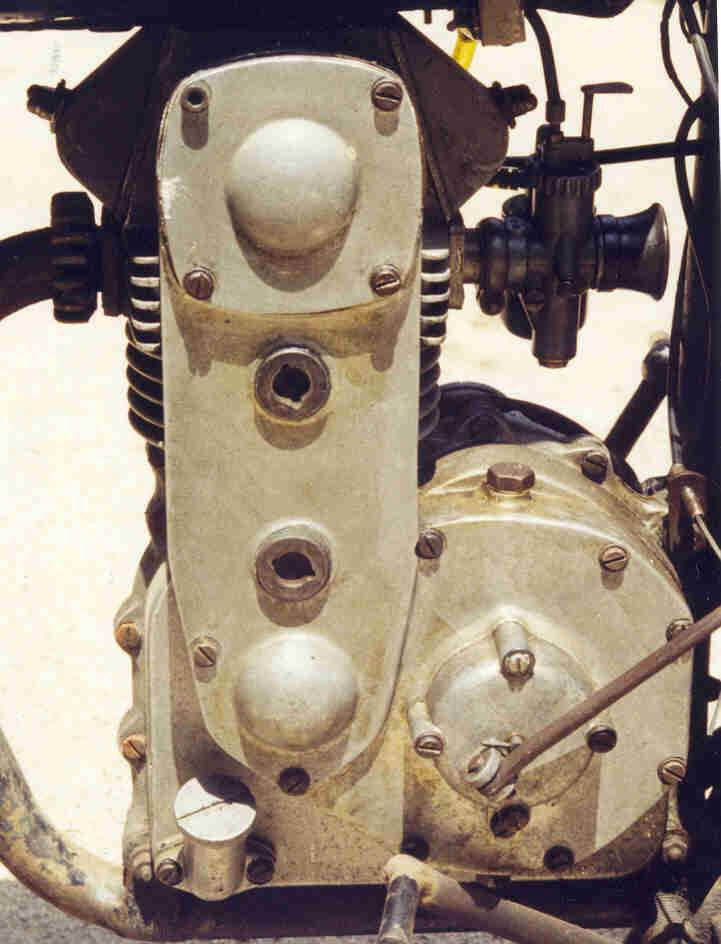
Tehuelche engine side view of single overhead cam with gear drive distribution

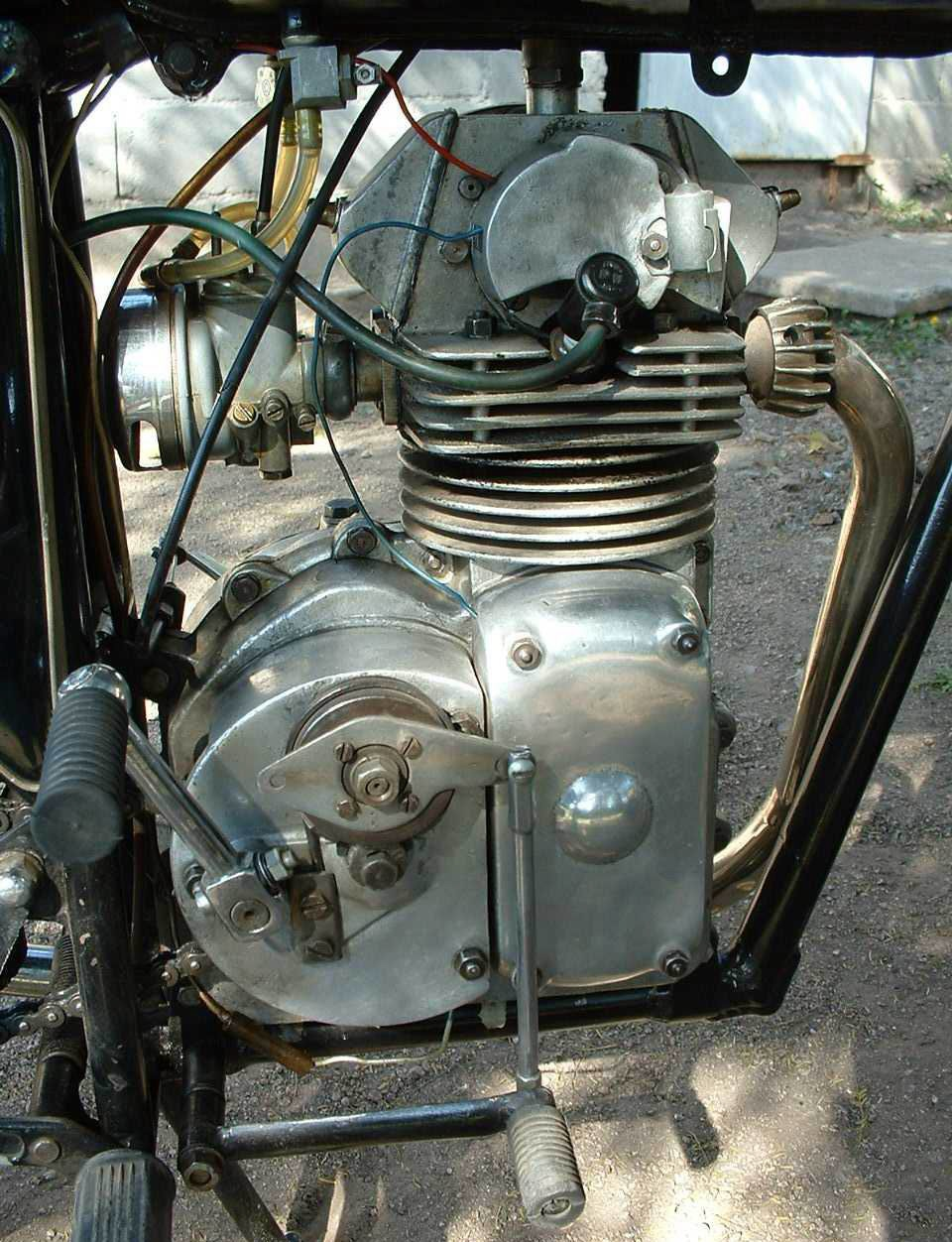
Tehuelche engine side view of gear change

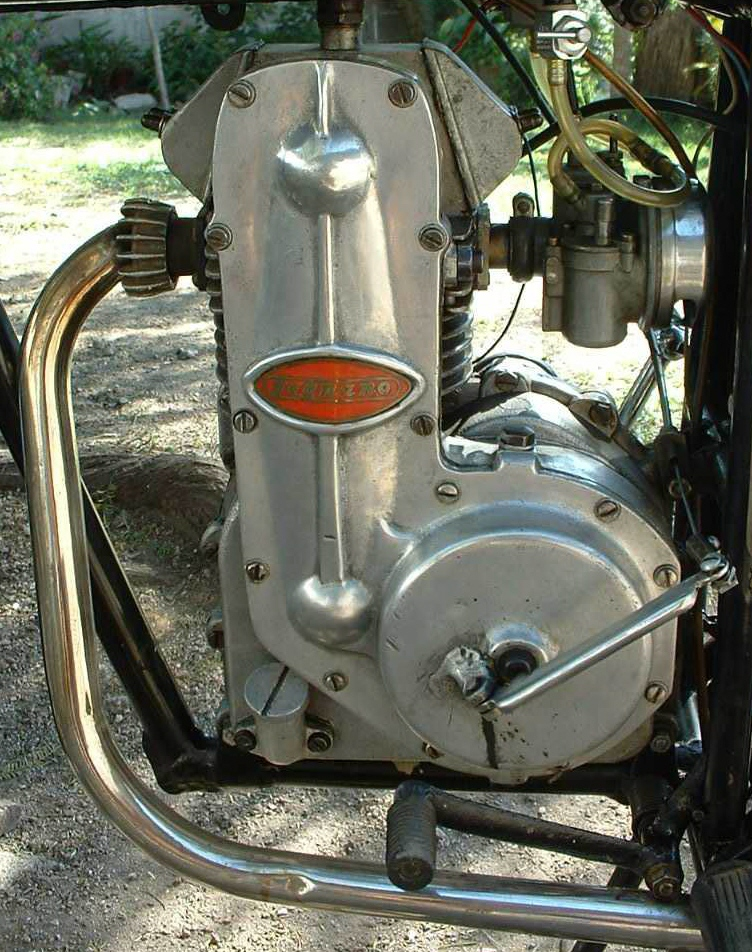
Tehuelche-Legnano- engine with single overhead cam with chain drive distribution
