= Magallanes Province =

Magallanes Province Provincia de Magallanes
- Province
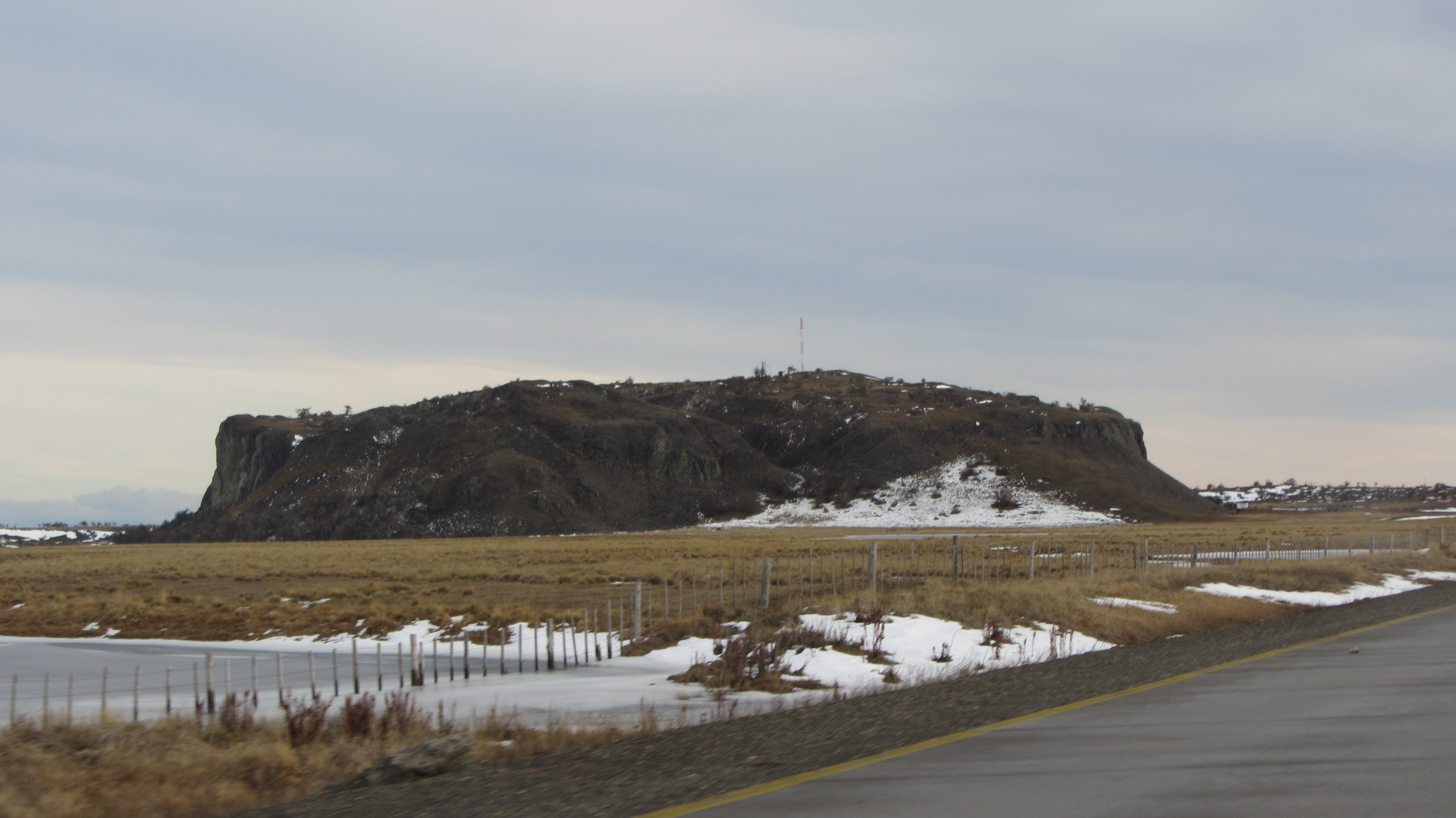
- Morro Chico, Laguna Blanca

- Seal

- Location in the Magallanes Region

- Location in Chile
- Coordinates: 53°10′S 70°56′W
- Country: Chile
- Region: Magallanes y Antártica Chilena
- Named for: Ferdinand Magellan
- Capital: Punta Arenas
- Communes: List of 4: Punta Arenas; Río Verde; Laguna Blanca; San Gregorio

Government
  - Type: Provincial
  - Governor: Nicolás Cogler Galindo (RN)

Area
  - Total: 36,400.8 km^{2} (14,054.4 sq mi)

Population (2024 Census)
  - Total: 132,975
  - Density: 3.65308/km^{2} (9.46143/sq mi)

Sex
  - Men: 65,438
  - Women: 67,537
- Time zone: UTC-3 (CLST)
  - Summer (DST): UTC-3 (CLST)
- Area code: 56 + 61
- Website: Government of Magallanes

Magallanes Province (Spanish: Provincia de Magallanes) is one of four provinces in the southern Chilean region of Magallanes and Antártica Chilena. The provincial capital is the city of Punta Arenas.

== Geography and demography ==
Its eastern portion is located along the northern shore of the Strait of Magellan while the western portion straddles the strait on either side of the strait's northwesterly stretch toward the Pacific Ocean. It is bordered by the Última Esperanza Province to the north and Tierra del Fuego to the south.

This is the main terrestrial and aerial entry point to the southernmost region in Chile. Either coming from Argentina, via Río Gallegos by car, or by plane, arriving at the Carlos Ibáñez Del Campo International Airport. On this province there are several touristic places, such as Port Famine, Fuerte Bulnes, two penguin colonies and the first marine park in the country.

According to National Statistics Institute's 2002 census, it has an area of 36,400.8 km^{2} (14,054 sq mi). It is the ninth largest province in the country. It then had a population of 121,675 inhabitants (62,360 men and 59,315 women), giving it a population density of 3.3/km^{2} (9/sq mi). Of these, 116,005 (95.3%) lived in urban areas and 5,670 (4.7%) in rural areas. Between the 1992 and 2002 censuses, the population grew by 4.4% (5,164 persons).

== Administration ==
As a province, Magallanes is a second-level administrative division of Chile, headed by a governor who is appointed by the president. It consists of four communes (Spanish: comunas): Punta Arenas, Río Verde, Laguna Blanca and San Gregorio.
