= Río Verde, Chile =

Río Verde
- Commune
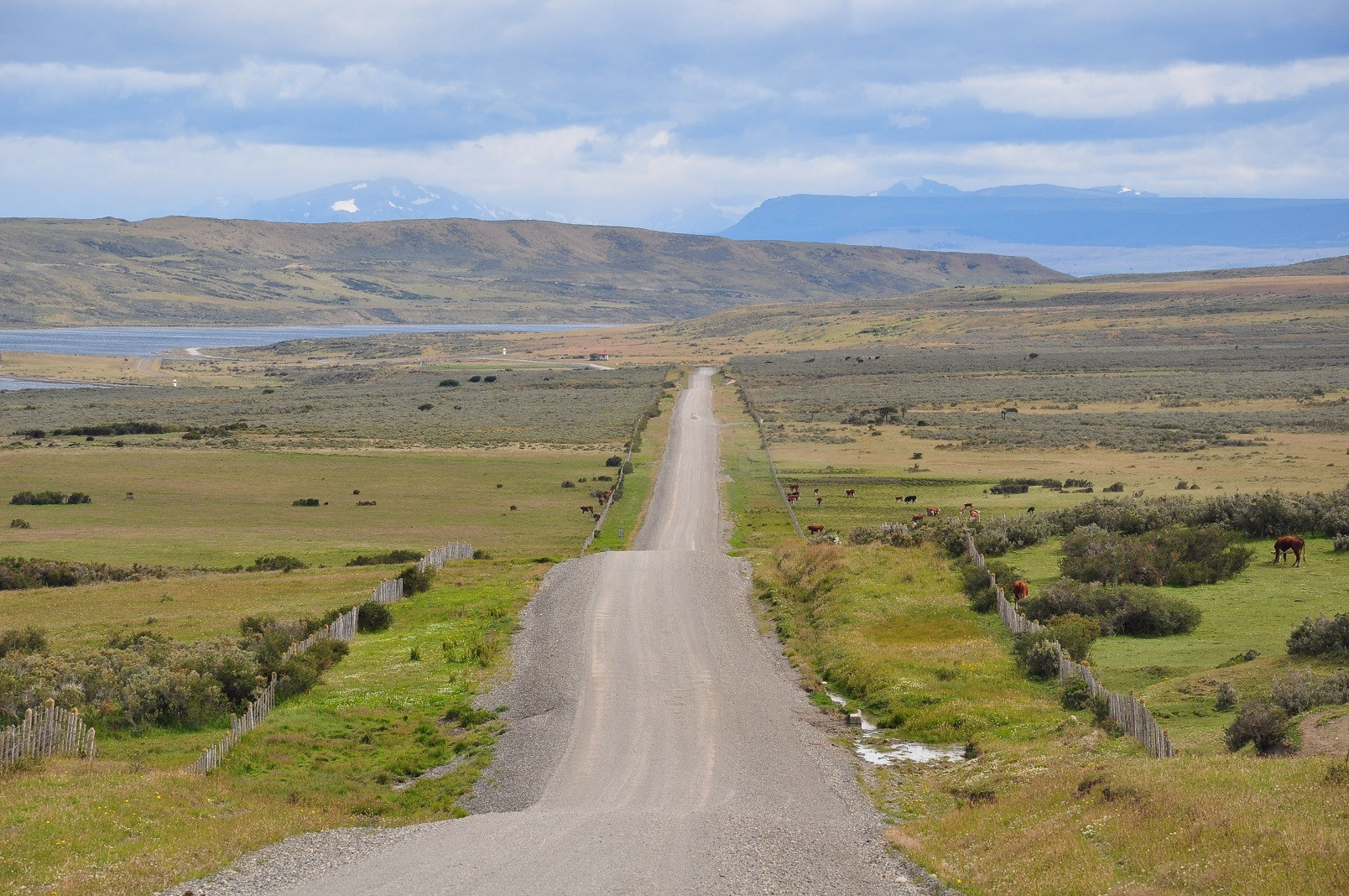
- The unpaved Road Y-50 in Chilean Patagonia, about 70 km north of Punta Arenas, going towards Rio Verde. On the left side is the narrow Fitz Roy Channel, with Isla Riesco on the other side. This area is very sparsely populated

- Location of the Río Verde commune in Magallanes Region Location in Chile
- Coordinates: 52°39′S 71°28′W
- Country: Chile
- Region: Magallanes y Antártica Chilena
- Province: Magallanes

Government
  - Type: Municipality
  - Alcalde: Tatiana Vásquez Barrientos (UDI)

Area
  - Total: 9,975.2 km^{2} (3,851.4 sq mi)
- Elevation: 14 m (46 ft)

Population (2012 Census)
  - Total: 153
  - Density: 0.0153/km^{2} (0.0397/sq mi)
  - Urban: 0
  - Rural: 358

Sex
  - Men: 295
  - Women: 63
- Time zone: UTC-4 (CLT)
  - Summer (DST): UTC-3 (CLST)
- Area code: 56 + 61
- Climate: Cfc
- Website: Municipality of Río Verde

Río Verde is a Chilean commune and settlement in Magallanes Province and Region. The commune is located in the area surrounding Seno Skyring, a sea inlet north of Riesco Island.

== Demographics ==
Historical population
Year	Pop.	±% p.a.
1930	508	—
1940	836	+5.11%
1952	600	−2.73%
1970	459	−1.48%
1982	429	−0.56%
1992	335	−2.44%
2002	358	+0.67%
2017	617	+3.70%
2024	102	−22.67%
Source: "Censo de Población y Vivienda". National Statistics Institute.

According to the 2002 census of the National Statistics Institute, Río Verde spans an area of 9,975.2 km^{2} (3,851 sq mi) and has 358 inhabitants (295 men and 63 women), making the commune an entirely rural area. The population grew by 6.9% (23 persons) between the 1992 and 2002 censuses.

== Administration ==
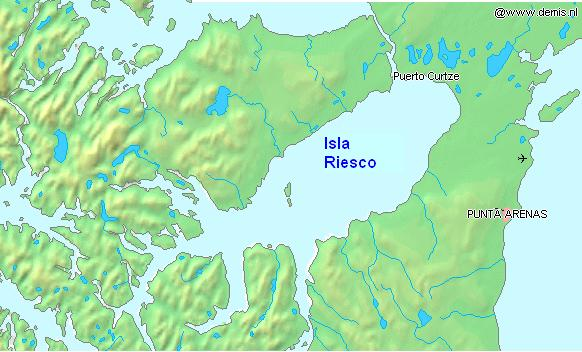
Pto.Curtze

As a commune, Río Verde is a third-level administrative division of Chile administered by a municipal council, headed by an alcalde who is directly elected every four years. The 2012-2016 alcaldesa is Tatiana Vásquez Barrientos (UDI).

Within the electoral divisions of Chile, Río Verde is represented in the Chamber of Deputies by Juan Morano (PDC) and Gabriel Boric (Ind.) as part of the 60th electoral district, which includes the entire Magallanes y la Antártica Chilena Region. The commune is represented in the Senate by Carlos Bianchi Chelech (Ind.) and Carolina Goic (PDC) as part of the 19th senatorial constituency (Magallanes y la Antártica Chilena Region).
