= San Gregorio, Chile =

San Gregorio
- Town and Commune
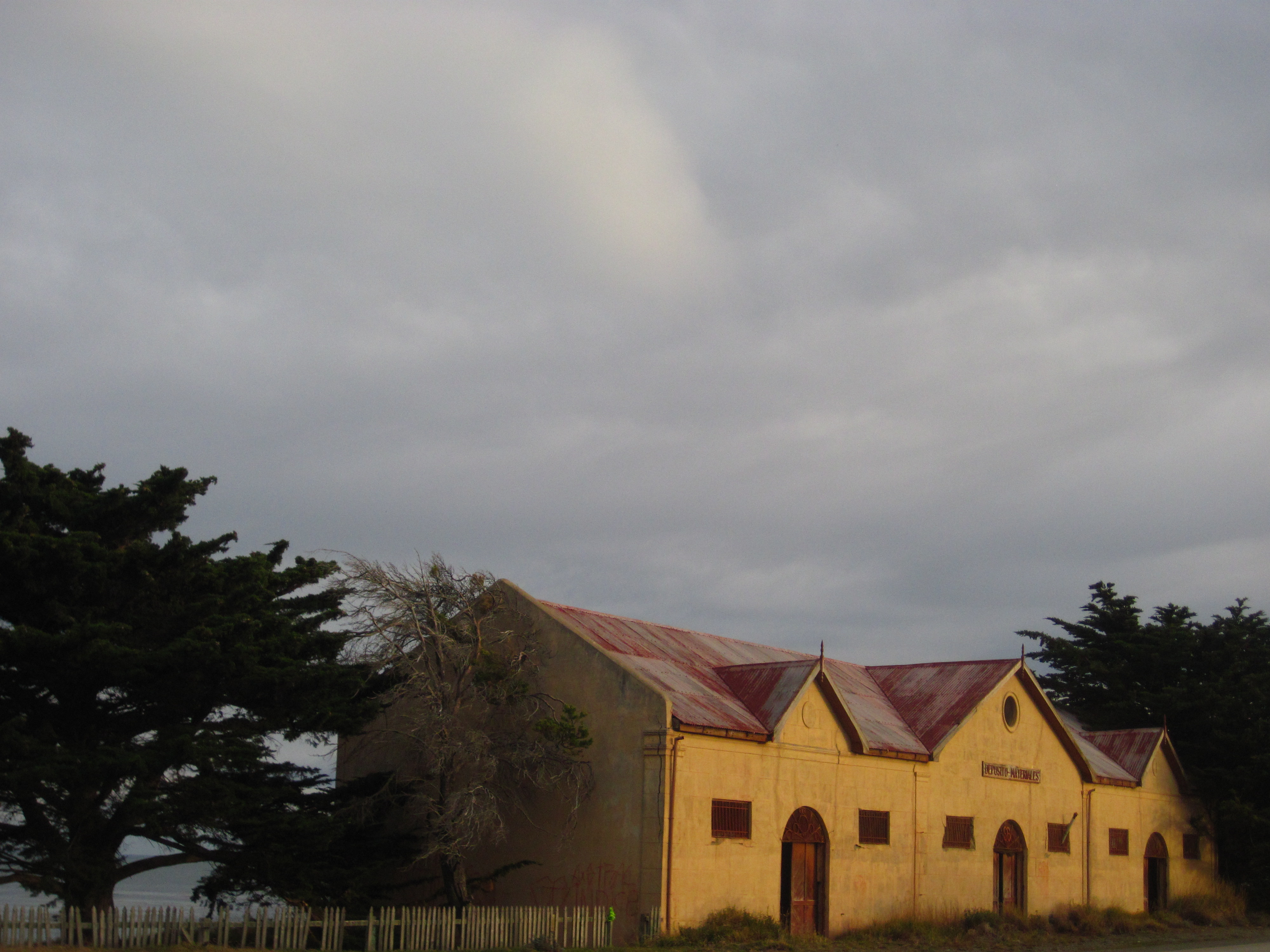
- Estancia San Gregorio

- Location of the San Gregorio commune in Magallanes Region Location in Chile
- Coordinates: 52°18′56″S 69°41′17″W
- Country: Chile
- Region: Magallanes y Antártica Chilena
- Province: Magallanes

Government
  - Type: Municipality
  - Alcalde: Edgar Cárcamo Alderete (Ind)

Area
  - Total: 6,883.7 km^{2} (2,657.8 sq mi)
- Elevation: 51 m (167 ft)

Population (2012 Census)
  - Total: 384
  - Density: 0.0558/km^{2} (0.144/sq mi)
  - Urban: 0
  - Rural: 1,158

Sex
  - Men: 886
  - Women: 272
- Time zone: UTC-4 (CLT)
  - Summer (DST): UTC-3 (CLST)
- Area code: 56 + 61
- Website: www.sangregorio.cl

San Gregorio is a commune in the far south of Chile. It is part of Magallanes Region and Province, and is administered by the municipality of the same name located in Punta Delgada, the principal town in the commune (the coordinates are those of Punta Delgada).

The comuna is on the north shore of the Strait of Magellan; between the Strait, to the south, and the border with Argentina, to the north. At the Primera Angostura, south of the town of Punta Delgada, there is a ferry crossing to Primavera commune on Tierra del Fuego Island. The good wind resource attracted a wind power project, scheduled for 2025.

== Features ==
In the settlement of Estancia San Gregorio (52°34′01″S 70°04′12″W), some 40 km (25 mi) southwest of Punta Delgada, there is an estancia, and several imposing buildings dating from 1882.

Nearby are wrecks of two 19th-century cargo ships. Ambassador was a sailing tea clipper, built in London in 1869 and beached at San Gregorio in 1896. Amadeo was a steamship, built in Liverpool in 1884 and beached at San Gregorio in 1932.

== Demographics ==
Historical population
Year	Pop.	±% p.a.
1930	998	—
1940	1,075	+0.75%
1952	1,031	−0.35%
1970	1,153	+0.62%
1982	1,835	+3.95%
1992	1,643	−1.10%
2002	1,158	−3.44%
2017	799	−2.44%
2024	241	−15.74%
Source: "Censo de Población y Vivienda". National Statistics Institute.

According to the 2002 census of the National Statistics Institute, San Gregorio spans an area of 6,883.7 km^{2} (2,658 sq mi) and has 1,158 inhabitants (886 men and 272 women), making the commune an entirely rural area. The population fell by 29.5% (485 persons) between the 1992 and 2002 censuses.

The population is mostly descended from Croatian, Spanish and other Europeans.

== Administration ==
As a comuna, San Gregorio is a third-level administrative division of Chile administered by a municipal council, headed by an alcalde who is directly elected every four years. The 2012–2016 alcalde is Edgar Cárcamo Alderete.

Within the electoral divisions of Chile, San Gregorio is represented in the Chamber of Deputies by Juan Morano (PDC) and Gabriel Boric (Ind.) as part of the 60th electoral district, which includes the entire Magallanes y la Antártica Chilena Region. The commune is represented in the Senate by Carlos Bianchi Chelech (Ind.) and Carolina Goic (PDC) as part of the 19th senatorial constituency (Magallanes y la Antártica Chilena Region).
