= Laguna Blanca, Chile =

Laguna Blanca
- Commune
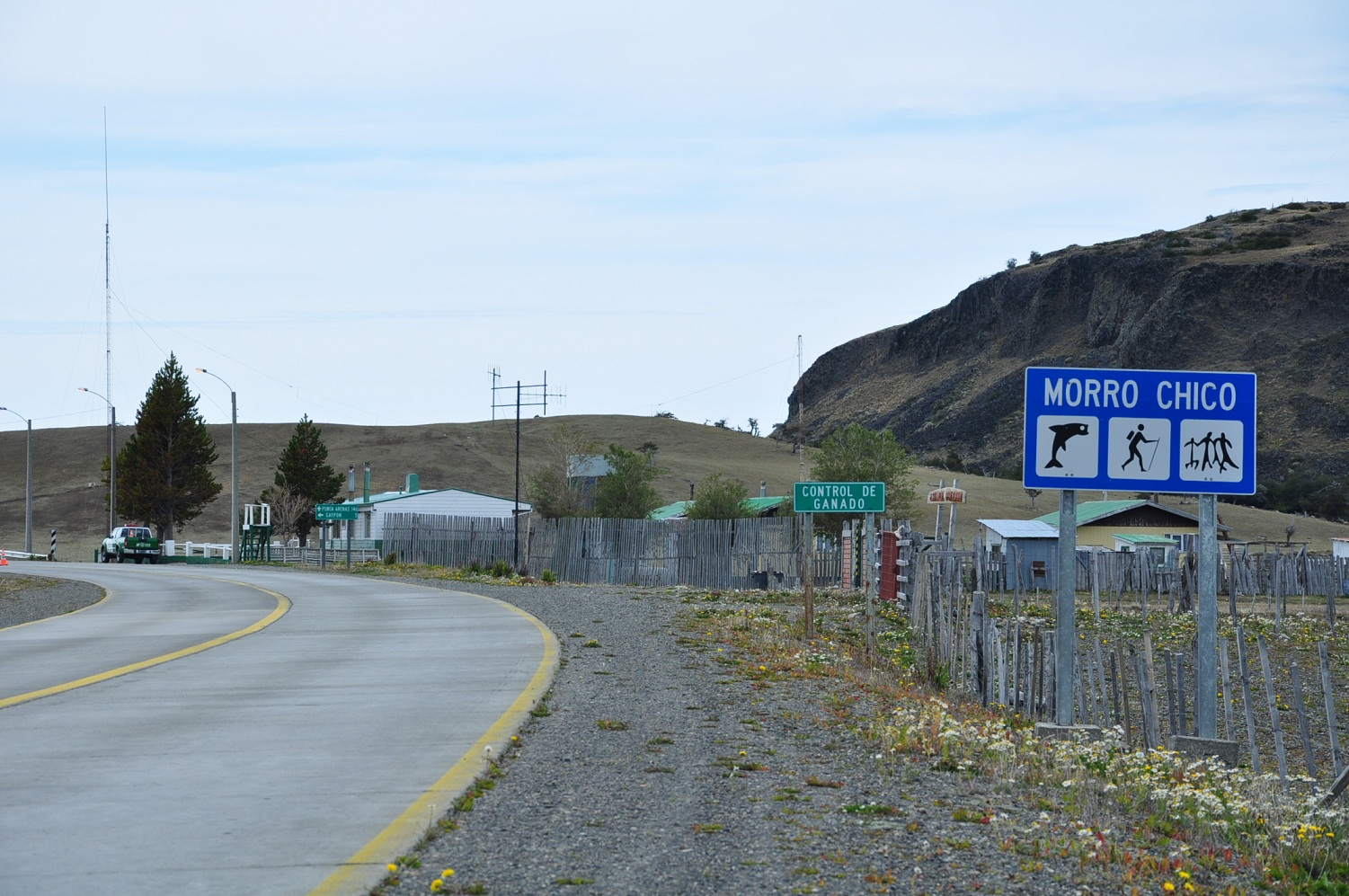
- Entering Morro Chico, the second largest settlement in the municipality of Laguna Blanca

- Location in the Magallanes y la Antártica Chilena Region Location in Chile
- Coordinates (commune): 52°15′S 71°55′W
- Country: Chile
- Region: Magallanes y Antártica Chilena
- Province: Magallanes

Government
  - Type: Municipality
  - Alcalde: Fernando Ojeda González (PS)

Area
  - Total: 3,695.6 km^{2} (1,426.9 sq mi)
- Elevation: 572 m (1,877 ft)

Population (2012 Census)
  - Total: 208
  - Density: 0.0563/km^{2} (0.146/sq mi)
  - Urban: 0
  - Rural: 663

Sex
  - Men: 563
  - Women: 100
- Time zone: UTC-4 (CLT)
  - Summer (DST): UTC-3 (CLST)
- Area code: 56 + 61
- Website: Municipality of Laguna Blanca

Laguna Blanca is a Chilean commune located in Magallanes Province and Region. The commune is administered by the municipality in Villa Tehuelches, that is the major settlement in the whole commune.

== Demographics ==
Historical population
Year	Pop.	±% p.a.
1930	605	—
1940	774	+2.49%
1952	750	−0.26%
1970	571	−1.50%
1982	459	−1.80%
1992	867	+6.57%
2002	663	−2.65%
2017	274	−5.72%
2024	269	−0.26%
Source: "Censo de Población y Vivienda". National Statistics Institute.

According to the 2002 census of the National Statistics Institute, Laguna Blanca spans an area of 3,695.6 km^{2} (1,427 sq mi) and has 663 inhabitants (563 men and 100 women), making the commune an entirely rural area. The population fell by 23.5% (204 persons) between the 1992 and 2002 censuses.

== Administration ==
As a commune, Laguna Blanca is a third-level administrative division of Chile administered by a municipal council, headed by an alcalde who is directly elected every four years. The current alcalde is Fernando Ojeda González (PS).
