= Primavera, Chile =

Primavera
- Commune
- Map of Primavera in the Magallanes and Antartica Chilena Region Location in Chile
- Coordinates: 52°43′S 69°15′W
- Country: Chile
- Region: Magallanes y Antártica Chilena
- Province: Tierra del Fuego

Government
  - Type: Municipality
  - Alcalde: Blagomir Brztilo Avendaño

Area
  - Total: 4,614.2 km^{2} (1,781.6 sq mi)
- Elevation: 12 m (39 ft)

Population (2012 Census)
  - Total: 545
  - Density: 0.118/km^{2} (0.306/sq mi)
  - Urban: 0
  - Rural: 1,016

Sex
  - Men: 735
  - Women: 281
- Time zone: UTC-4 (CLT)
  - Summer (DST): UTC-3 (CLST)
- Area code: 56 + 61
- Website: www.municipalidaddeprimavera.cl

Primavera (Spanish for "spring") is a Chilean commune in Tierra del Fuego Province, Magallanes and Antartica Chilena Region, Chile. It is located on the north of Tierra del Fuego Island. Its main settlement is Cerro Sombrero.

== Demographics ==
Historical population
| Year | Pop. | ±% p.a. |
|---|---|---|
| 1930 | 522 | — |
| 1940 | 566 | +0.81% |
| 1952 | 906 | +4.00% |
| 1970 | 1,673 | +3.47% |
| 1982 | 2,190 | +2.27% |
| 1992 | 1,629 | −2.92% |
| 2002 | 1,016 | −4.61% |
| 2017 | 1,158 | +0.88% |
| 2024 | 431 | −13.17% |
Source: "Censo de Población y Vivienda". National Statistics Institute.

According to the 2002 census of the National Statistics Institute, Primavera spans an area of 4,614.2 km^{2} (1,782 sq mi) and has 1,016 inhabitants (735 men and 281 women), making the commune an entirely rural area. The population fell by 38% (613 persons) between the 1992 and 2002 censuses.

== Administration ==
As a commune, Primavera is a third-level administrative division of Chile administered by a municipal council, headed by an alcalde who is directly elected every four years. The 2012–2016 alcalde is Blagomir Brztilo Avendaño.

Within the electoral divisions of Chile, Primavera is represented in the Chamber of Deputies by Juan Enrique Morano (PDC) and Gabriel Boric (Ind.) as part of the 60th electoral district, which includes the entire Magallanes and Antartica Chilena Region. The commune is represented in the Senate by Carlos Bianchi Chelech (Ind.) and Carolina Goic Boroevic (PDC) as part of the 19th senatorial constituency (Magallanes Region).
