= List of islands of Chile =

This is a list of islands of Chile, as listed by the National Geospatial-Intelligence Agency, Country Files (GNS). The country has 43,471 islands, according to the Chilean Ministry of National Assets and the Chilean Military Geographical Institute, in the last update in 2019.

This list only includes the generic, inverted full name. The complete term used to identify a named feature is known as the full name. As stored in the database, the entire name is output as "Desertores, Islas" rather than reading "Islas Desertores."

The feature's latitude and longitude is expressed in decimal degrees.

A geographically named feature is uniquely identified by a Unique Feature Identifier (UFI), which is a number. A similar UFI denotes a similar feature.

Chilean claims in the Antarctic are not included on this list. see also the list of islands in the Antarctic and subantarctic.

The general terms "isla", "isla de/los/las", "islote", "islita", "isleta", "island," "islet," "islets," "rocks," "islas," "islotes," "islas de," "Archipiélago," and "Grupo" are used to name the items in NGA.

== More information ==
For more information about the island search in GeoNames Search, using the Unique Feature Id (UFI) in the "Advanced Search" Form.

== Inconsistencies and phantom islands ==
The following Chilean islands are not listed by the National Geospatial-Intelligence Agency:

1. Águila Islet (the really southernmost tip of American Chile)
2. Calbuco Archipelago (but includes Calbuco Island)
3. Desventuradas Islands (They are under the names "San Ambrosio" UFI -900077, "González" UFI -883263 and "San Félix" UFI -900282)

Elizabeth Island (Cape Horn), Podesta (island), Pactolus Bank or other phantom islands are not listed. Gable Island is listed by NGA as a Chilean Island, but it is Argentine.

== List of islands ==
Islands, islets and Archipelagos of Chile
Listnr	Name	Latitude	Longitude	Area km^{2}	UFI	Other names
1	Alacrán, Isla	-18.48054	-70.332019	0.062	-871584	
2	Península, Isla	-19.824591	-70.165037		-895751	
3	Blancas, Rocas	-19.829316	-70.171461		-892171	Mejillones, Islotes
4	Cololue, Islotes	-19.966667	-70.166667		-877913	
5	Serrano, Isla	-20.207871	-70.160139		-901549	
6	Gaviotas, Islote	-20.567306	-70.198072		-883122	
7	Yapes, Islotes	-20.677236	-70.193738		-904926	
8	Patillos, Islotes	-20.752301	-70.200412		-895396	
9	Pájaros, Islotes	-21.047959	-70.168072		-894677	
10	Blanco, Islote	-22.095055	-70.21889		81327	
11	Lagartos, Islote	-23.366667	-70.6		-886335	
12	Santa María, Isla	-23.437201	-70.60748		-901068	
13	Lobos, Isla	-23.508176	-70.606669		-889500	
14	Guamán, Isla	-23.555198	-70.407577		-883669	Guanosa, Isla Guzmán, Isla
15	Águila, Islote	-23.926971	-70.518505		-871510	Anguilla, Islote
16	Blanco, Islote	-25.354686	-70.446922		-873730	
17	Afuera, Islote de	-25.393903	-70.516175		-871257	
18	Tórtolas, Islotes	-25.515102	-70.650068		-903125	
19	Tope Blanco, Islote	-25.78348	-70.743463		-902970	
20	Arturo Fernández Vial, Islas	-25.892421	-70.70285		-882622	Fernández Vial, Islotes
21	Pan de Azúcar, Isla	-26.155638	-70.685843	1.0	-894969	
22	San Félix, Isla	-26.291052	-80.095234	2.0	-900282	
23	González, Isla de	-26.316667	-80.1	0.25	-883263	González, Islote
24	San Ambrosio, Isla	-26.34283	-79.887721	3.1	-900077	
25	Salas y Gómez, Isla	-26.471733	-105.361364	0.15	-899938	Motu Motiro Hiva
26	Blanca, Isla	-26.704669	-70.7574		-873606	Blanco, Islote
27	Ramadas, Islote	-27.007205	-70.809533		-898658	
28	Centinela Negro, Islote	-27.048244	-70.854226		-876068	
29	Blanco, Islote	-27.051063	-70.855537		-873731	Centinela Blanco, Islote
30	Jorge, Islotes	-27.08696	-70.869409		-885356	
31	Easter Island	-27.116667	-109.366667	163.6	-905269	Rapa Nui, Isla de Pascua
32	Aguja	-27.195848	-109.449721		-893090	Motu-Kao-Kao, Mutu Kau Kau, Mutu-Rau-Kau
33	Motu-Iti, Islote	-27.199449	-109.452261		-893089	
34	Flat Rocks	-27.201164	-109.45292		-893091	Motu-Nui, Mutu-Nui
35	Grande, Isla	-27.245073	-70.974384		-883361	
36	García, Isla	-27.270787	-70.957366		-883045	
37	Guanillos, Isla de	-27.593275	-70.913333		-883769	Ruky, Isla Guanillos o Ruky, Islote
38	Cima Cuadrada, Isla	-27.688474	-71.04852		-877413	
39	Gaviotas, Islote de las	-27.855133	-71.113481		-883123	
40	Carrizal, Isla	-28.077423	-71.150067		-875512	
41	Herradura, Isla	-28.092769	-71.170103		-884110	
42	Los Islones, Islotes	-28.186282	-71.171483		-890285	
43	Cayo, Islote	-28.456867	-71.227648		43022	
44	Ballena, Islote	-28.458805	-71.222738		81290	
45	Piqueros, Islote	-28.459284	-71.226475		81297	
46	Blanco, Islote	-28.45982	-71.269877		80514	
47	Alcatraz, Islote	-28.461446	-71.266641		80508	
48	Panulcillo, Islote	-28.463516	-71.232475		81300	
49	Los Puentes, Islotes	-28.463674	-71.266803		43020	
50	Guacolda, Isla	-28.464644	-71.256518		-883548	
51	Erizal, Islote	-28.468217	-71.263446		80505	
52	Chañaral, Isla	-29.033273	-71.577893	6.55	-876480	
53	Azócar, Islotes	-29.05	-71.6		-872874	
54	Apolillados, Islotes	-29.183333	-70.5		-872434	
55	Las Ventanas, Islotes	-29.202636	-71.493374		-888473	
56	Damas, Isla	-29.234518	-71.526409		-879361	
57	Gaviota, Isla	-29.26099	-71.479217		-883119	
58	Choros, Isla	-29.268132	-71.541559		-877198	Choros, Islas de los
59	Chungungo, Isla	-29.41254	-71.357169		-877334	Chungungo, Isla
60	Los Farallones, Islotes	-29.485561	-71.333315		-890211	
61	Tilgo, Isla	-29.543918	-71.336615		-902746	
62	Pájaros, Islas	-29.586331	-71.536381		-894678	
63	Pájaros, Islas	-29.916667	-71.366667		-894676	
64	Outer Pajaros	-29.921815	-71.35451		-894684	Pájaros de Afuera, Islotes
65	Pájaros Niños, Islote	-29.930413	-71.352491		-894687	
66	Los Lobos, Isla	-30.285847	-71.659989		-890367	
67	Lobera, Isla	-30.306687	-71.666263		-889477	
68	La Flor, Isla	-30.431612	-71.690583		-886271	
69	Talquilla, Isla	-30.870455	-71.684778		-902333	
70	Los Lobos, Isla de	-30.924132	-71.683593		-890369	
71	Lenes, Isla	-31.823012	-71.545881		-889032	Lilenes, Isla
72	Verde, Isla	-31.865483	-71.538612		-904219	
73	Penitente, Isla	-31.874913	-71.573109		-895759	
74	Blancas, Islas	-31.878011	-71.531123		-873675	
75	Huevos, Isla	-31.906667	-71.527222		-884611	
76	Lobos, Isla de los	-32.473317	-71.439955		-890368	Los Lobos, Isla
77	Baja, Roca	-32.49745	-71.46594		-896655	Pite, Isla
78	La Raspa	-32.53605	-71.506821		-887422	
79	Liles, Isla	-32.548088	-71.464042		-889033	
80	Cachagua, Isla	-32.586559	-71.457136		-874447	
81	Concón, Isla de	-32.88946	-71.520434		-878213	La Isla, Islote
82	León, Islote	-33.081944	-71.666667		130862	
83	Gaviota, Islote	-33.089517	-71.724877		130870	
84	Lobos, Islote	-33.100789	-71.743186		130871	
85	Bayas, Islas	-33.35	-71.683333		-873374	
86	Pájaros Niños, Isla	-33.360248	-71.687262		-894685	Pájaros Niños
87	Juanaga, Islote	-33.6	-78.916667		-885418	Juanango, Juanungo
88	Aguas Buenas	-33.636041	-78.85146	47.94	-899487	Isla de Juan Fernandez, Más a Tierra, Róbinson Crusoe
89	Juan Fernández, Archipiélago	-33.661321	-78.927803	99.6	-885429	
90	El Verdugo	-33.666667	-78.8		-881960	
91	Los Chamelos	-33.666667	-78.866667		-890052	Los Chanchos
92	Goat Island	-33.708417	-78.94219	2.2	-900909	Santa Clara, Isla
93	Alejandro Selkirk, Isla	-33.761816	-80.787023	49.5	-871698	Más Afuera, Massafuera
94	Pupuya, Isla	-33.973064	-71.893593		-897791	
95	Lobos, Isla de los	-34.139122	-72.009935		-889499	Lobos, Roca
96	Quiriquina, Isla	-36.625768	-73.060805	4.86	-898520	
97	Los Reyes, Isla de	-36.727778	-73.058333		164971	
98	Prenzel, Islote	-36.745833	-73.183333		129535	
99	Los Lobos, Islotes	-36.783333	-73.216667		129944	
100	Farallón, Islote	-36.960755	-73.541418		-882559	Farellón, Islote
101	Santa María, Isla	-37.024526	-73.523379		-901069	
102	Uchaguapi, Islote	-37.372017	-73.666488		-903773	
103	Pichiguapi, Islote	-37.379274	-73.669568		-896140	
104	Mocha, Isla	-38.371602	-73.912293	48	-892655	
105	Blanca, Isla	-38.411543	-73.944253		-873607	
106	Muerto, Isla del	-38.422095	-73.927262		-893112	
107	Consuelo, Islote	-38.443258	-73.896005		-878360	
108	Quechol, Isla	-38.445754	-73.904119		-898001	
109	Doña Inés, Isla	-38.730869	-73.355735		-879829	
110	Nahuelhuapi, Isla	-38.860341	-73.286973		-893250	
111	Pilar, Isla	-38.880434	-73.299155		-896393	
112	Guapi, Isla del	-38.903013	-73.311618		-883801	
113	Licán, Isla	-39.034306	-73.11212		-888992	
114	Allaquillén, Isla	-39.250781	-72.15012		-871823	
115	Trailafquén, Isla	-39.53906	-72.234155		-903238	
116	Rialejo, Isla	-39.707469	-73.20314		-899151	
117	Gabriela, Isla	-39.761122	-72.154276		-882948	
118	Teja, Isla	-39.80372	-73.259547	7.72	-902537	
119	Guacamayo, Isla	-39.875819	-73.275106		-883526	Guadamayo, Isla
120	Mancera, Isla	-39.89134	-73.392508	0.6	-891547	
121	Rey, Isla del	-39.898767	-73.298642		-899132	
122	Llilleifén, Isla	-40.168443	-72.334404		-889384	Llilleipen, Isla
123	Macalla, Isla	-40.215572	-72.424429		-891158	
124	Chichitivas, Isla	-40.217913	-72.447012		-876832	
125	Llanquihuapi, Isla	-40.219455	-72.453841		-889311	
126	Guapi, Isla	-40.225068	-72.379282		-883800	Huape
127	Peñique, Isla	-40.246239	-72.45679		-895754	
128	Llahuapi, Isla	-40.250906	-72.321397		-889224	
129	Colcuma, Isla	-40.273939	-72.417542		-877762	
130	Trumao, Isla	-40.346822	-73.241218		-903614	
131	El Farallón	-40.349294	-73.765187		-880775	Farellón
132	Quilacahuín, Isla	-40.403959	-73.270114		-898193	
133	Fresia, Isla	-40.668348	-72.421804		-882851	
134	Cuicui, Islas	-40.681955	-72.385931		-879018	
135	Cabras, Isla	-40.875353	-72.456982		-874405	
136	Cabras, Isla de las	-41.109843	-72.288245		-874408	
137	Tenglo, Isla	-41.498124	-72.972732		-902592	
138	Chincui, Isla	-41.509941	-73.014865		-877044	Chinquiu, Isla
139	Caullaguapi, Islita	-41.524252	-73.038461		242036	Caullahuapi, Isla
140	Chacalluta, Isla	-41.539196	-73.038132		11282195	
141	Nutria, Isla	-41.566667	-73.683333		-893932	Nutrias, Isla de las
142	Maille, Isla	-41.57233	-72.990079		-891287	Maillén, Isla
143	El Colle, Isla	-41.59413	-72.987248		11278915	
144	Las Rocas, Islas	-41.618311	-73.076954		11282265	
145	Elisa, Isla	-41.6	-73.55		-880913	
146	Huelmo, Isla	-41.65455	-73.053353		-884495	
147	Grande, Farallón	-41.669444	-73.836667		-883360	
148	Goigoi, Farallón	-41.678889	-73.832778		-883218	
149	Guar, Isla	-41.684277	-72.951234		-883816	Huar, Isla
150	Horcones, Islote	-41.690556	-73.81		-884303	
151	Poe, Islote	-41.691667	-72.4		242033	
152	Marimeli, Isla	-41.692365	-72.454072		-891830	
153	Pirén, Islotes	-41.711104	-72.683781		-896607	Pirén, Isla
154	Cuitúe, Islote	-41.711824	-72.602908		11278920	
155	Caicura, Isla	-41.719786	-72.686965		-874563	
156	Tautil, Isla	-41.722107	-73.051452		-902502	
157	Caicura, Islotes	-41.728015	-72.685938		11279221	
158	Doña Sebastiana, Isla	-41.738056	-73.813611		-879842	
159	Chaullín, Isla	-41.758377	-73.098761		-876702	
160	Quigua, Isla	-41.761847	-73.21679		-898187	Quihua, Isla
161	Calbuco, Isla	-41.789865	-73.147012		-874659	
162	Puluqui, Isla	-41.799614	-73.036343		-897602	
163	Lacao, Isla	-41.808333	-73.618889		-885866	
164	Lagartija, Isla	-41.811389	-73.286944		-886320	
165	Abtao, Isla	-41.814226	-73.325848		-871157	
166	Lenu, Isla	-41.829895	-73.150193		-898092	Quenu, Isla
167	Chidguapi, Isla	-41.833833	-73.092525		-876876	Chidhuapi, Isla
168	Cochinos, Isla	-41.843333	-73.804167		-877562	
169	Grande, Isla	-41.849972	-72.791375		11280235	
170	Polmallelhue, Isla	-41.875098	-73.165081		-896930	
171	Aulén, Isla	-41.876971	-72.820052		-872804	Autén, Isla
172	Gueillín, Isla	-41.880967	-72.913038		-898155	Queullín, Isla
173	Llanquinelhue, Isla	-41.883465	-73.141311		11283296	
174	Tabón, Grupo	-41.895129	-73.117556		11287099	
175	Lin, Isla	-41.896235	-73.072404		-889086	
176	Tabón, Isla	-41.908458	-73.114802		-902209	
177	Nao, Isla	-41.908882	-72.882172		-893305	
178	Nautilus, Isla	-41.967621	-71.845492		-893345	
179	Duhatao, Isla	-41.988261	-74.058528		-879963	
180	Inútil, Isla	-42.027568	-72.479368		-895553	Pelada, Isla
181	Mañíu, Isla	-42.033333	-72.633333		-891595	
182	Tromacho, Isla	-42.037352	-74.047837		-903558	
183	Garzas, Islote	-42.05	-72.65		242007	
184	Cuchillo, Isla	-42.05	-72.6		-878933	
185	Llanchid, Isla	-42.05	-72.616667		-889288	
186	Toro, Isla	-42.05352	-72.59642		-903028	
187	Malomacún, Isla	-42.05531	-72.631427		-891471	
188	Cabras, Isla	-42.059444	-72.529167		-874406	
189	Lobos, Isla	-42.061944	-72.545556		-889498	
190	Llanchid, Archipiélago	-42.066667	-72.633333		-889287	Llanchilmo, Archipiélago
191	Mutri, Isla	-42.068842	-72.610979		-893205	
192	Linguar, Isla	-42.070733	-72.634601		-889132	Nilne Nilue, Isla
193	Ahuenco, Islote	-42.098088	-74.055845		-871543	
194	Abel, Isla	-42.109375	-72.601675		-871132	
195	Llancahué, Isla	-42.113552	-72.53094		-889278	
196	Olvidada, Isla	-42.126757	-72.613827		-895935	Perra, Isla Perras, Islote Perros, Islote
197	Caucahué, Isla	-42.146377	-73.396839		-875888	
198	Ballena, Islote	-42.15	-72.6		-873040	
199	Liliguapi, Isla	-42.15895	-72.594652		-889040	Lilihuapi, Isla
200	Aucar, Isla	-42.161888	-73.47899		-872778	
201	Metalqui, Isla	-42.195207	-74.149286		-892338	
202	Poeguapi, Isla	-42.216667	-72.7		242004	
203	Ablín, Isla	-42.252305	-73.159044		-872806	Aulín, Isla Peñohué, Isla
204	Changues, Islas	-42.262305	-73.151823		-876706	Chauques, Islas Chauquis
205	Corcovado, Islote	-42.265841	-74.172411		-878498	
206	Cheñao	-42.279036	-73.227586		-876768	Cheniao, Isla Cheñiau
207	Quetén, Isla	-42.291699	-73.23022		-898131	
208	Chauques Occidentales, Grupo	-42.299282	-73.192472		-876707	
209	Buta, Isla	-42.301444	-73.100267		-874308	Buta Chauques, Isla Buta-Chauquis Chauque, Isla Chauques Chauqui, Isla Cochi, Isla Butachauques, Isla
210	Machinqui	-42.301767	-73.270043		-892060	Machiuqui, Isla Mechoque, Isla Mechuque, Isla
211	Taucolón, Isla	-42.316039	-73.210848		-902497	
212	Chauques Oriental, Grupo	-42.316667	-73.15		-876708	
213	Añehué, Isla	-42.335269	-73.246622		-872327	Añihué, Isla
214	Buill, Isla	-42.356395	-72.790336		-884804	Huell, Isla Ica, Isla
215	Linlín, Isla	-42.385243	-73.435264		-889139	
216	Tac, Isla	-42.386102	-73.123939		-902218	
217	Meulín, Isla	-42.425251	-73.302189		-892360	
218	Linna, Isla	-42.42778	-73.444358		-889390	Linua, Isla Lligñúa, Isla Llingua, Isla Llinua
219	Chequetén, Isla de	-42.447105	-73.424005		-876798	
220	Teuquelín, Isla	-42.460886	-73.24289		-902675	
221	Quinchao, Isla	-42.469127	-73.514654	135	-898433	
222	Quenac, Isla	-42.471254	-73.341407		-898082	
223	Caguache, Isla	-42.487562	-73.265239		-874541	Cahuache Cuhuache
224	Quemada, Isla	-42.500764	-72.800761		-898056	
225	Chiloé, Isla de	-42.55798	-73.946759	8394	-876968	Chiloé, Isla Grande de Chiloé, Isla
226	Linlinao, Isla	-42.574232	-73.747965		-889141	
227	Chelín, Isla	-42.575748	-73.518109		-876754	
228	Alao, Isla	-42.59505	-73.293137		-871611	Alau, Isla
229	Apiao, Isla	-42.598265	-73.213103		-872428	
230	Chaulinec, Grupo	-42.609132	-73.265219		-876699	
231	Imaleb, Isla de	-42.615744	-73.406171		-884879	Imel Imelev, Isla
232	Chulín, Isla	-42.616116	-73.030212		-877298	
233	Lemui, Isla	-42.619077	-73.649085	97	-888840	Lemuy, Isla
234	Inchui, Isla	-42.624804	-73.482986		-898008	Quehui, Isla
235	Calto, Isla	-42.627848	-72.932596		-893694	Nihue, Islote Nihuel, Isla Nituel, Isla
236	Chaulinec, Isla	-42.641424	-73.293042		-876700	Chaulinet
237	Yal, Islote	-42.659897	-73.656896		-904898	
238	Chuil, Isla	-42.665479	-73.079767		-877291	Chuit, Isla
239	Chiloé, Archipiélago de	-42.666667	-73.916667	9181	-876967	
240	Llahuén, Isla	-42.680005	-72.840163		-889226	Llahuenhuapi
241	Imerquiña, Isla	-42.69703	-73.09463		-884882	
242	Desertas	-42.700779	-73.020813		-879525	Desertores, Islas Desiertas
243	Nayahué, Isla	-42.73138	-73.063674		-893373	
244	Ahulliñi, Isla	-42.739899	-73.082506		-871546	
245	Jorge, Islote	-42.744239	-73.00687		-885357	Jorje, Isla
246	Talcán, Isla	-42.745214	-72.964972		-902306	
247	El Solitario, Islote	-42.755901	-73.064256		-894199	O’Higgins, Islote
248	Chala, Isla	-42.85767	-73.723779		-876393	
249	Chagualín, Islote	-42.887526	-73.514151		-876348	
250	Conejos, Islote	-42.913098	-73.592372		-878289	
251	Acui, Isla	-42.921411	-73.428151	2	-871214	Acuy, Isla
252	Puduguapi, Isla	-42.952646	-72.787858		-897393	
253	Guachipín, Isla	-42.961073	-73.46826		-903291	Tranqui, Isla
254	Rosario, Isla	-43.013963	-72.814013		-899699	
255	Gemelos, Islotes	-43.013987	-72.804431		-883136	Los Jemelos, Islotes
256	Auchemó, Grupo	-43.014169	-72.818192		-872782	
257	Roberto, Islote	-43.016667	-72.8		-899479	
258	Carmen, Isla	-43.019143	-72.828846		-875400	
259	Chaullín, Isla	-43.048669	-73.448749		-876703	
260	Linagua, Isla	-43.150981	-73.722952		-889091	
261	Cailín, Isla	-43.170103	-73.555196		-874569	
262	Coldita, Isla	-43.204357	-73.699128		-877766	
263	Laitec, Isla	-43.216259	-73.61103		-886665	Leytec, Isla Liliguapi, Isla
264	Mauchil, Isla	-43.257989	-73.670622		-891978	
265	Linagua, Isla	-43.269812	-72.979536		-889092	Linahua, Isla
266	Blanco, Islote	-43.324422	-73.66442		-873732	Blancos, Islotes
267	Guedanchaga, Islotes	-43.324701	-73.737954		-883895	
268	Elena, Isla	-43.336131	-73.695863		-893963	Observatorio, Isla
269	San Pedro, Isla de	-43.352754	-73.733739		-900730	
270	Redonda, Isla	-43.358333	-74.1975		-898857	Redondo, Islote
271	Guapiquilán, Isla	-43.388349	-74.262883		-898218	Quilán, Isla
272	Vigía, Isla del	-43.398115	-74.210456		35760	
273	Yencouma, Isla	-43.406471	-74.091343		-904980	
274	Guapi Quilán, Islas	-43.408468	-74.262594		-883805	Guapiquilán, Islas
275	Guamblin, Islotes	-43.417945	-73.729986		-883680	Huamblin, Islotes
276	Refugio, Isla	-43.420385	-74.243759		-898929	
277	Surgidero, Isla	-43.428848	-74.248284		35715	
278	Salort, Isla	-43.434709	-74.26979		-900002	
279	Dolores, Isla	-43.438832	-74.254586		35717	
280	Leguas, Isla	-43.443555	-74.248867		35718	
281	Alfa, Isla	-43.445256	-74.20452		35721	
282	Esmeralda, Grupo	-43.450184	-74.195833		-882258	
283	Beta, Islote	-43.455	-74.200833		35724	
284	Omega, Islote	-43.459444	-74.204444		35727	
285	Mayor, Isla	-43.467819	-74.208559		-892035	
286	Hichango, Isla	-43.580151	-73.02697		-884297	Horadada, Isla Ichanec, Isla
287	Gaufo, Isla	-43.593029	-74.713481	300	-883559	
288	Verde, Islote	-43.595176	-72.983363		-904223	
289	Becerra, Isla	-43.60942	-72.96171		-873430	Becerra, Islote
290	Azócar, Islote	-43.610144	-73.015629		-872873	
291	Lipip, Isla	-43.610898	-72.989809		-889159	Lipipe, Isla
292	Amigos, Islotes de los	-43.613263	-72.957507		35599	
293	Escondida, Isla	-43.616667	-72.9		-882209	
294	Huerta, Isla	-43.620792	-72.978016		-884586	Huerta, Islote
295	Guapán, Isla	-43.637369	-73.004465		-884560	Huepán, Isla
296	Tictoc, Islas	-43.63958	-73.013515		6145225	
297	Colocla, Isla	-43.640099	-73.025618		-877908	Colosia, Isla
298	Hernández, Isla	-43.657894	-72.998775		-884101	
299	Linacre, Isla	-43.664321	-73.028522		-889089	
300	Queitao, Islas	-43.725343	-73.486112		-898017	
301	Hermanas, Islas	-43.77249	-73.040505		-887916	Las Dos Hermanas, Grupo
302	Urano, Islote	-43.775581	-74.001974		-903851	
303	Saturno, Islote	-43.77991	-74.006029		-901324	
304	Los Lobos, Farallones de	-43.783333	-73.016667		-890366	
305	Júpiter, Islote	-43.784444	-74.04		35799	
306	Gaviota, Islotes	-43.785078	-73.909873		-883124	Gaviotas, Islotes
307	Pájaros, Islas	-43.786944	-72.987222		-894679	
308	Leones, Isla	-43.788497	-72.955666		-890317	
309	Marta, Isla	-43.789371	-74.068685		-891872	Marte, Isla
310	Boca, Isla de La	-43.795484	-72.963424		-885743	
311	Pájaros Niños, Islote	-43.796629	-74.092737		-894686	
312	Guacanec, Isla	-43.797185	-73.997545		-883527	
313	Los Canales, Isla	-43.824051	-72.93505		-889976	
314	Sargento, Isla	-43.829854	-73.935119		-901294	
315	Canelo, Isla	-43.854947	-73.731323		-875066	
316	Guaiteca, Isla Gran	-43.855995	-74.008799		-883610	
317	María, Islote	-43.871944	-74.154167		35858	
318	Ascensión, Isla	-43.872477	-73.799807		-872679	Asuncion, Isla Lacchilu, Isla Lauchilu, Isla de
319	Murta, Islote	-43.8775	-74.1575		35856	
320	Yates, Isla	-43.881741	-73.667481		-904946	
321	Manzano, Islas	-43.883333	-73.650278		-891683	
322	Falsa, Isla	-43.883889	-73.736111		36268	
323	Westhoff, Isla	-43.896655	-73.6754		-904779	
324	Campos, Isla	-43.901255	-73.656459		-874941	
325	Loquitos, Islote	-43.906554	-73.594499		-889776	
326	Caniao, Isla	-43.912173	-73.256301		-875086	
327	Aguada, Isla	-43.913789	-73.619074		-871509	Aguda, Isla Águila, Isla
328	Luisa, Isla	-43.9	-73.683333		-891086	
329	Tea, Isla	-43.920063	-73.662491		-902510	
330	Guaitecas, Grupo	-43.921322	-73.825841		-883611	
331	Clothide, Isla	-43.923834	-73.797297		-877513	Clotilde, Isla
332	Mercedes, Isla	-43.924017	-73.741427		-892276	
333	Cae, Isla	-43.924279	-74.006813		-874534	
334	Günther, Isla	-43.92671	-73.696496		-883945	
335	Toro, Islote	-43.933333	-73.766667		-903032	
336	Huayninec, Isla	-43.936615	-73.645006		-885462	Julia, Isla
337	Emin, Isla	-43.940764	-73.710725		-882015	Emma, Isla
338	Bajas, Islas	-43.9425	-74.104326		-872991	
339	Constantino, Isla	-43.943406	-74.14897		-878354	
340	Larenas, Isla	-43.949508	-74.068597		-887443	
341	Fresia, Isla	-43.951275	-73.773773		-882852	
342	Anita, Isla	-43.95	-73.766667		-872347	
343	Carbunco, Islote	-43.95	-73.766667		-875250	
344	Betecoi, Isla	-43.959315	-73.858419		-873565	Betecoy, Isla
345	Huatimó	-43.964035	-73.179698		-898930	Refugio, Isla
346	Locos, Islotes	-43.981815	-73.454627		-889552	
347	Cuervo, Isla	-43.983367	-73.893144		-878962	
348	Larga, Isla	-43.983775	-73.109641		-887457	Long, Isla
349	Manzano, Grupo	-43.984212	-73.672985		-895643	Peligroso, Islas
350	Pato, Islote	-43.984611	-73.570727		-895401	
351	Garza, Isla	-43.994274	-73.739809		-883085	
352	Tuamapu, Isla	-44.001466	-74.198664		-903626	
353	Pochas, Islotes	-44.007471	-73.847644		-896849	
354	Laurel, Isla	-44.013889	-73.753333		-888630	
355	Yalac, Isla	-44.017933	-73.250551		-904900	
356	Rhone, Islas	-44.02495	-74.125538		-899147	
357	Llenihuenu, Isla	-44.025833	-74.238333		-889352	
358	Leucayec, Isla	-44.025921	-73.670785		-888952	
359	Gemelos, Islotes	-44.0275	-73.874444		-883137	Jemelos, Islotes
360	Hulaud, Isla	-44.033333	-74.166667		-884734	
361	Sin Nombre, Islote	-44.0341	-73.816219		-901728	
362	Riquelme, Islote	-44.035031	-73.483762		-899418	
363	Elvira, Isla	-44.043889	-73.563333		-881970	
364	Sierra, Isla	-44.054609	-73.940444		-901621	
365	Riquelme, Isla	-44.059444	-74.153081		-899415	
366	El Amortajado, Isla	-44.061394	-73.799767		-880163	
367	Ovalada, Isla	-44.066667	-73.716667		-894455	
368	Llano, Isla	-44.076111	-74.0775		-889305	Llanos, Isla
369	Amita, Isla	-44.079162	-73.866709		-872136	
370	Barranco, Isla	-44.079722	-73.255833		-873231	
371	Arthur, Isla	-44.082491	-74.246961		-872641	
372	Peinado, Islote	-44.083435	-73.809202		-895531	
373	Jack, Isla	-44.088333	-73.773333		-904889	Yack, Isla
374	Morel, Isla	-44.091439	-74.040734		-892978	
375	Ceres, Isla	-44.105278	-73.765278		-876118	
376	Mallers, Isla	-44.108953	-74.26404		-892209	Mallersh, Isla Mallerst, Isla
377	Bobe, Isla	-44.117857	-73.741306		-873797	
378	Canave, Isla	-44.123797	-74.144764		-874989	
379	Burgos, Islote	-44.133333	-73.483333		-874273	
380	Gusanillo, Isla	-44.133333	-73.833333		-883950	
381	Goicolea, Isla	-44.137253	-74.099203		-883216	
382	Miulchey, Isla	-44.138089	-73.503118		-893139	Molchei, Isla Mulchen, Isla Mulchey, Isla
383	Sánchez, Isla	-44.141411	-73.55991		-900214	
384	Concola, Isla	-44.144026	-73.916361		-878224	Concoto, Isla
385	Mike, Isla	-44.146667	-73.455556		-892405	
386	Gusano, Grupo	-44.148056	-73.814167		-883951	Gusano, Islas
387	Midhurst, Isla	-44.15118	-74.290528		-892398	
388	Doroteo, Islote	-44.15	-73.483333		-879893	
389	Obaid, Islote	-44.15	-73.466667		-893937	
390	Roa, Grupo	-44.162771	-73.761533		-899469	Roa, Rocas
391	Aparicio, Islote	-44.166667	-73.483333		-872421	
392	Catitas, Isla	-44.176719	-73.513092		-875863	Catitas, Islote
393	Verdugo, Isla	-44.182372	-73.67334		-904252	
394	Serrano, Isla	-44.199635	-73.63046		-901550	
395	Bustos, Isla	-44.201598	-74.155874		-874307	
396	Chipana, Isla	-44.208889	-73.759722		-877057	
397	May, Isla	-44.208983	-74.270617		-892014	
398	Rudy, Isla	-44.22566	-73.19384		-899796	
399	Harry, Isla	-44.226944	-73.223611		-884029	
400	Aguayo, Isla	-44.228066	-73.739396		-871494	
401	Chaffers, Isla	-44.230694	-74.007048		-876336	
402	Lagarto, Isla	-44.233333	-73.7		-886330	
403	Elena, Isla	-44.244727	-73.80583		-880705	
404	Gusano, Islote	-44.245445	-73.224684		-883952	
405	Chita, Isla	-44.247905	-73.204368		-877089	
406	Gala, Grupo	-44.25175	-73.213505		-882958	Gala, Islas
407	Toto, Isla	-44.261096	-73.209975		-903150	
408	Pontón, Isla	-44.261111	-73.563889		-896981	
409	Forsyth, Isla	-44.263889	-74.318889		-882761	Forsythe, Isla
410	Pepe, Islote	-44.266971	-73.193101		-895808	
411	Los Quincheles, Islas	-44.268825	-73.525167		-898435	
412	Téllez, Isla	-44.268889	-74.138056		-902552	
413	Hulk, Rocas	-44.269532	-74.475447		-884735	
414	Gala, Isla	-44.273416	-73.215275		-882959	
415	Wargny, Isla	-44.275553	-73.135919		-904750	
416	García, Isla	-44.276092	-73.682637		-883046	
417	Bajo, Isla del	-44.289444	-73.628333		-872994	
418	El Gorro, Isla	-44.306438	-73.464237		36080	
419	Alejandro, Islote	-44.309167	-73.092778		-871697	
420	Valverde, Isla	-44.312873	-73.861392		-904029	
421	Enrique, Isla	-44.313333	-73.121248		-882075	
422	Vico, Isla	-44.313333	-73.278333		-904323	
423	Garrao Chico, Isla	-44.316667	-73.733333		-883077	
424	Gemmel, Isla	-44.325458	-72.916563		-883156	Gennell, Isla
425	Ballena, Isla	-44.327222	-73.550556		-873037	Ballena, Islita
426	Manuel, Isla	-44.331311	-73.035695		-891652	
427	Mustafá, Grupo	-44.333333	-73.75		-893201	
428	Los Cayes	-44.335421	-73.387555		-890026	
429	Chués, Isla	-44.337778	-73.593889		-877280	Job, Isla
430	Guía, Isla	-44.344371	-73.716161		-883909	
431	Inés, Islote	-44.344698	-72.950605		-884974	
432	Suárez, Isla	-44.349289	-72.922149		-902058	
433	Jhonson, Isla	-44.354756	-74.321019		-885337	Johnson, Isla
434	Atilio, Isla	-44.358611	-73.231667		-872760	
435	Bolados, Isla	-44.359742	-74.125149		-873836	
436	Mac, Isla	-44.366667	-73.583333		-891152	
437	Broken, Islas	-44.372707	-74.425941		-874091	
438	Pen-Davis, Isla	-44.377222	-73.873889		35979	
439	Garrao, Isla	-44.378483	-73.707826		-883075	Itapa, Isla
440	Larga, Isla	-44.381684	-72.944142		-887458	
441	Rojas, Isla	-44.382007	-73.971863		-899579	
442	Lamalec, Isla	-44.400278	-73.627778		-886828	
443	Dirección, Islote	-44.404293	-73.770187		-879715	
444	Guardiamarina Zañartu, Isla	-44.405724	-72.824009		-883829	
445	Bobadilla, Islas	-44.424263	-72.888286		-873796	
446	Jechica, Isla	-44.434445	-73.845716		-885303	
447	Peligrosa, Isla	-44.443713	-73.733738		-895637	Peligroso, Islote
448	Macetero, Islote	-44.444993	-72.784086		-891170	
449	Proa, Islote	-44.457222	-73.910556		-897280	
450	Level, Isla	-44.462198	-74.353241		-888961	
451	Filomena, Isla	-44.468889	-73.5975		-882654	
452	Copihue, Islote	-44.471389	-73.646667		36115	
453	Carlos, Islote	-44.483333	-72.733333		-875367	
454	Magdalena, Islote	-44.483333	-73.833333		-891259	
455	Mázote, Grupo	-44.483333	-73.783333		-892046	
456	Oreste, Islote	-44.483333	-72.733333		-894347	Orestes, Islote
457	Sodival, Grupo	-44.483333	-73.566667		-901816	
458	Lagora, Isla	-44.490019	-73.531083		-886370	
459	Marta, Isla	-44.497989	-73.794667		-891873	
460	Mercedes, Isla	-44.498287	-73.861142		-892277	
461	Tahuenahuec, Isla	-44.501544	-74.048166		-902245	
462	Queulat, Isla	-44.501791	-72.605213		-898145	
463	Matilde, Isla	-44.505975	-73.728252		-891967	
464	Francisco, Isla	-44.511246	-73.629887		-882818	
465	Lehuelat, Islote	-44.519167	-73.573333		-888815	
466	Izaza, Isla	-44.5325	-74.237222		-885196	
467	Brieva, Islote	-44.533333	-73.883333		-874066	
468	Carmencita, Isla	-44.534119	-73.909097		-875421	
469	Oppisso, Isla	-44.539444	-73.623333		-894316	
470	Canalad, Isla	-44.547771	-73.334726		-874961	Canale, Isla
471	Nassau, Isla	-44.554288	-73.577221		-893334	
472	Blanco, Islote	-44.586111	-73.880278		-873733	
473	Gertrudis, Isla	-44.589833	-73.920491		-883178	Jertrudis, Isla
474	Elvirita, Grupo	-44.591111	-74.361944		-881974	Elvirita, Islotes
475	Guato, Isla	-44.606111	-74.763056		-885076	Ipun, Isla Narborough, Isla
476	Cay, Isla de	-44.624809	-73.070108	2025	-891257	Desierto, Islas Magdalena, Isla Motalat, Isla de
477	Calcai, Isla	-44.64232	-73.706877	320	-879163	Cuptana, Isla Guabtana, Isla de Nevada, Isla
478	Macetero, Islote	-44.65	-73.6		-891171	
479	Stokes, Isla	-44.655081	-74.532832		-902030	
480	Letreros, Isla	-44.658321	-73.596383		-888950	
481	Las Carabelas, Islotes	-44.666667	-73.833333		-887718	
482	Benjamín, Isla	-44.67792	-74.104977	618.2	-873523	
483	Lorca, Isla	-44.683333	-73.583333		-889781	
484	Medio, Isla	-44.683333	-73.6		-892118	
485	Tortuga, Isla	-44.687364	-72.711471		-903134	
486	Sierra, Isla	-44.716667	-73.583333		39886	
487	Abd el Krim, Grupo	-44.716667	-73.766667		-871130	
488	Senec, Isla	-44.723122	-73.471401		-901514	
489	Temuán, Isla	-44.72535	-73.572159		-902570	
490	Jesús, Isla	-44.728948	-73.869814		-885319	
491	Topaze, Grupo	-44.75	-73.833333		-902969	
492	Cayonec, Isla	-44.753413	-73.430192		-883884	Guayanec, Isla Huayanec Huaynec, Isla
493	Chonos, Archipiélago de los	-44.756336	-74.094444		-877176	Guaitecas, Archipiélago de las
494	Blanco, Cayo	-44.782243	-73.535741		-873688	Cayo Blanco, Islote
495	Soria, Isla	-44.783333	-73.766667		-901929	
496	Tránsito, Isla	-44.788358	-73.651391		-903304	
497	Rowlett, Isla	-44.790458	-74.417946		-899748	
498	El Enjambre, Grupo	-44.810847	-73.575553		-880730	
499	Jorge, Isla	-44.817627	-74.021478		-885352	
500	Florencia, Isla	-44.819538	-73.754403		-882721	
501	Mauricio, Isla	-44.833333	-73.75		-892007	
502	Ramsés II, Isla	-44.833333	-73.733333		-898700	
503	Canal, Isla	-44.834948	-73.730412		-874957	
504	Guamblin, Isla	-44.844729	-75.107687		-883679	Huamblin, Isla Nuestra Señora del Socorro, Islas de
505	Marta, Islote	-44.844892	-73.001374		39884	
506	Teresa, Isla	-44.857172	-73.819781		-902629	
507	Lalanca, Isla	-44.869	-73.632125		-886742	
508	Cervantes, Islote	-44.883333	-73.716667		-876203	
509	Sainec, Isla	-44.903677	-73.630062		-899873	
510	María Isabel, Islotes	-44.9117	-73.423365		-891802	
511	Tabón, Isla	-44.916885	-73.13853		-902210	
512	Albo, Islote	-44.9	-73.716667		-871632	
513	Galvarino, Isla	-44.9	-73.683333		-883016	
514	Jame, Isla	-44.929304	-74.130909	388	-885226	James, Isla
515	San Andrés, Isla	-44.930867	-73.332086		-900092	
516	Tisné, Islotes	-44.934933	-73.445153		-902832	
517	Williams, Isla	-44.935657	-74.384212		-904831	
518	Tuap, Isla	-44.938246	-73.499864		-903627	
519	Pax, Isla	-44.943005	-74.632419		-895451	Paz, Isla
520	Lola, Isla	-44.966667	-73.5		-889597	
521	Cuicuyahuon, Isla	-44.96758	-73.631811		-894665	Pajal, Isla
522	Silachilu, Isla	-44.967918	-73.665593		-901651	
523	Liebre, Isla	-44.977867	-74.607388		-889010	
524	Guía, Isla	-44.978434	-73.548618		-883910	
525	Gemelos, Islotes	-44.983333	-73.916667		39927	
526	Eugenia, Islote	-44.983333	-73.483333		-882458	
527	Lela, Isla	-44.983333	-73.483333		-888829	
528	Licha, Isla	-44.983333	-73.5		-889004	
529	Los Yuyos, Grupo	-44.983333	-73.55		-890996	
530	Pity, Isla	-44.983333	-73.5		-896680	
531	Chalacayec, Isla	-44.99679	-73.762243		-876395	
532	Viola, Isla	-45.006979	-73.491935		-904565	
533	Oreste, Isla	-45.010577	-73.450571		-894346	Orestes, Isla
534	Tangbac, Isla	-45.010719	-73.688851		-902413	
535	Pomar, Grupo	-45.014758	-73.420707		-896956	
536	Moraleda, Isla	-45.016667	-74.333333		39923	
537	Leucoton, Islote	-45.016667	-74.166667		39924	
538	María Teresa, Isla	-45.016667	-73.466667		-891813	
539	Latolque, Isla	-45.024715	-73.52262		-888540	
540	Dar, Isla	-45.025932	-73.710587		-879377	
541	Ñancul, Isla	-45.039112	-73.426781		-893292	
542	Tadeo, Isla	-45.058319	-73.511162		-902234	
543	Luchín, Isla	-45.060306	-73.416877		-891063	
544	Anchile, Isla	-45.065821	-73.58665		-872785	Auchile, Isla
545	Hilda, Isla	-45.066711	-73.453375		-884187	
546	Larenas, Isla	-45.083231	-73.508526		-887444	
547	Purén, Isla	-45.086137	-74.269408		-897847	
548	Kent, Isla	-45.103131	-74.365938		-885581	
549	Julián, Isla	-45.108051	-73.505755		-885473	
550	Melchor, Isla	-45.113416	-73.902402	863.5	-892188	Meleguen, Islas
551	Ester, Isla	-45.120594	-73.387265		-882432	
552	Germain, Isla	-45.126877	-73.55129		-883170	
553	Los Amigos, Islas	-45.12762	-73.497465		-889835	
554	Gatica, Isla	-45.133333	-73.583333		-883090	
555	El Morro, Isla	-45.14167	-73.626716		-881212	El Morro, Islote
556	Rocoso, Grupo	-45.147177	-73.626607		-899531	
557	Rojas, Isla	-45.14794	-73.568636		-899580	
558	Las Huichas, Isla	-45.151793	-73.520863		-887939	
559	Groetaers, Isla	-45.15	-73.466667		-883491	
560	Navarrete, Grupo	-45.151984	-73.553389		-893350	
561	Tres Ratas, Grupo	-45.156165	-73.607658		-903477	
562	Precaución, Islote	-45.156617	-73.497187		-897247	
563	Cárdenas, Isla	-45.163449	-73.609503		-875278	
564	Occidental, Grupo	-45.166667	-73.616667		-893980	
565	Eugenio, Islote	-45.166837	-73.514879		-882463	
566	Andruche, Isla	-45.16927	-73.486246		-872257	
567	Las Huichas, Islas	-45.176967	-73.45857		-887938	
568	Maceteros, Grupo	-45.177892	-73.584861		-890407	
569	Dirección, Islote	-45.179448	-73.618564		-879716	
570	Gloria, Islotes	-45.183333	-73.516667		-883197	
571	Trinidad, Isla	-45.183333	-73.533333		-903539	
572	Vergara, Isla	-45.187423	-73.523566		-904263	
573	Swett, Isla	-45.188065	-73.589049		-902168	
574	Martita, Islote	-45	-73.483333		-891897	
575	Lemu, Isla	-45.193192	-74.519153		-888837	
576	Viel, Isla	-45.19652	-73.58496		-904405	
577	Alvarado, Isla	-45.197793	-73.545182		-872041	
578	Boina, Islote	-45.214419	-73.519851		-885748	
579	Doña Digna, Islote	-45.216667	-73.583333		-879824	
580	Rosa, Islote	-45.216667	-73.633333		-899667	
581	Vicho, Islote	-45.216667	-73.516667		-904312	
582	El Blanco, Islote	-45.221635	-73.642533		-880242	
583	Pilcomayo, Isla	-45.227972	-73.544371		-896401	
584	Flores, Isla	-45.229447	-73.530798		-882727	
585	Dring, Isla	-45.232631	-74.331079		-879942	Drink, Isla
586	Melita, Islote	-45.233333	-73.65		-892207	
587	Rosario, Islote	-45.233333	-73.633333		-899700	
588	Zola, Isla	-45.235992	-73.522473		-905182	
589	Atena, Grupo	-45.238031	-73.578301		-872756	Atenais, Grupo
590	Costa, Isla	-45.239247	-73.554804		-878711	
591	Soltau, Isla	-45.248568	-74.581445		-901891	
592	Maillard, Islote	-45.25	-73.566667		-891286	
593	Cabras, Isla	-45.258945	-74.643808		-874407	
594	Meninea, Isla	-45.263856	-73.62681		-892256	Menineo, Isla
595	Cinco Hermanas, Islas	-45.264074	-73.251337		-890073	Cinco Hermanos, Islas
596	Polizzi, Isla	-45.267403	-73.605673		-896914	
597	Carvallo, Isla	-45.270077	-73.461292		-875592	
598	Vallenar, Islas	-45.272587	-74.605346		-904015	
599	Terrazas, Isla	-45.275941	-73.610003		-902649	
600	Fermandois, Isla	-45.276894	-73.596696		-882623	Fernandois, Isla
601	Chacalai, Isla	-45.277855	-73.529517		-876326	Chaculay, Isla Chagulay, Isla
602	Lobada, Isla	-45.278892	-74.645684		-889472	
603	Desierta, Isla	-45.286634	-74.625828		-879532	
604	Marín, Isla	-45.287858	-73.600598		-891833	
605	Victoria, Isla	-45.290238	-73.948576	354	-904336	
606	Tres Dedos, Isla	-45.290896	-74.572919		-903402	
607	Bonito, Islote	-45.294547	-73.239332		-873902	
608	Petiso, Islote	-45.309419	-73.251248		-895983	Petizo, Islote
609	Herrera, Islotes	-45.312546	-73.472934		-884122	
610	Peligro, Islote	-45.312908	-73.754008		-895644	Peligroso, Islote
611	Castillo, Isla	-45.315438	-73.721679		-875779	
612	Elena, Isla	-45.316667	-73.383333		-880706	
613	Playa, Islote	-45.3	-73.616667		-896772	
614	Sanhueza, Islote	-45.3	-73.616667		-900349	
615	Tozzoni, Isla	-45.3	-73.733333		-903203	
616	Sur, Islote	-45.320275	-73.57667		-902115	
617	Santa María, Isla	-45.327793	-73.688619		-901070	
618	Pandolfini, Isla	-45.328776	-73.702616		-894980	
619	Auchilú, Isla	-45.330385	-74.594942		-872786	
620	Cherchia, Isla	-45.335433	-73.731419		-876877	Chiercha, Isla Chierchia, Isla Chierchie, Isla
621	Iquilao	-45.337006	-74.380457		-885169	Isquiliac, Isla Ivquiliac, Isla
622	Churrecué, Isla	-45.337746	-73.528143		-877376	
623	Colorada, Isla	-45.342986	-73.349561		-877930	
624	Aminta, Islote	-45.343217	-73.41499		-872134	
625	Parenti, Isla	-45.349207	-73.734693		-895210	
626	Italia, Isla	-45.353539	-74.166697		-885181	
627	Barba, Grupo	-45.356663	-73.710518		-873169	
628	Veneria, Isla	-45.360538	-74.263333		-904154	
629	Pescetto, Islas	-45.362384	-73.71759		-895969	
630	González, Islote	-45.364074	-73.596864		-883264	
631	Pisagua, Isla	-45.365134	-74.097891		-896629	
632	Quillín, Isla	-45.368497	-74.10158		-898347	
633	Entrada, Islotes	-45.369094	-74.083126		-882100	
634	Rodríguez, Islotes	-45.369876	-73.490776		-899562	
635	Gutiérrez, Isla	-45.374409	-73.594351		-883959	
636	Palumbo, Isla	-45.383333	-74.033333		-894883	
637	Mitahues, Isla	-45.401884	-73.736658		-892640	
638	Lavinia, Isla	-45.405158	-74.25431		-888733	
639	Bravo, Isla	-45.405945	-73.551395		-875735	Casma, Isla
640	Lamencura, Islotes	-45.406586	-74.058766		-886883	Lomencuro, Islotes
641	Lobos, Islote	-45.407229	-74.054162		-889501	
642	Quemada, Isla	-45.407614	-73.900711		-898057	
643	Nalcas, Isla	-45.408596	-72.816202		-888104	
644	Lavín, Isla	-45.409929	-73.58682		-888721	
645	La Mentirosa, Isla	-45.410802	-72.975117		-886885	
646	Maracci, Isla	-45.410856	-74.134913		-891751	Marcacci, Isla
647	Caniglia, Isla	-45.420985	-74.097913		-875092	
648	Partida, Isla	-45.423025	-72.845387		-895259	
649	Quemado, Islote	-45.425861	-72.828409		-898069	
650	Renaico, Isla	-45.430667	-73.632976		-899030	
651	Barrientos, Islotes	-45.433333	-73.55		-873272	
652	Tránsito, Isla	-45.434415	-72.812769		-903305	
653	Smith, Islotes	-45.436438	-74.125946		-901771	
654	Agüea, Isla	-45.441711	-74.204526		-871497	
655	Carmen, Isla	-45.442773	-72.851405		-875401	Grande, Isla
656	Pangal, Islote del	-45.449653	-73.82644		-894990	
657	Patranca, Isla	-45.457854	-74.156705		-897105	Potranca, Isla
658	González, Islas	-45.462248	-73.762367		-898140	Quetros, Islotes
659	Analao, Isla	-45.465767	-74.700188		-872162	
660	Luz, Isla	-45.486088	-73.953091		-891135	
661	Garrido, Isla	-45.492498	-74.490773		-883081	
662	Matilde, Isla	-45.520482	-74.189584		-891968	
663	Ballico, Isla	-45.557089	-73.780577		-873061	
664	Puyó, Isla	-45.563381	-74.73236		-897932	
665	MacIntyre, Islote	-45.569585	-74.146228		-891201	
666	Centro, Grupo	-45.569961	-73.809216		-876087	
667	Puyó, Islas	-45.571274	-74.78268		-897933	
668	Rivero, Isla	-45.575584	-74.349892	451.5	-899462	
669	Traiguén, Isla	-45.583333	-73.7	520.2	-903232	
670	Tovarías, Islotes	-45.588928	-74.144749		-903197	
671	Condell, Islotes	-45.589378	-74.196329		-878231	
672	Blanco, Grupo	-45.601962	-74.132649		-873729	
673	Meinhold, Isla	-45.61364	-74.114568		-892163	
674	Mogote, Islote	-45.616667	-74.133333		-892677	
675	Carlos, Isla	-45.628447	-74.088566		-875362	
676	Humos, Isla	-45.633333	-73.983333		-884755	
677	Acuao, Isla	-45.637276	-73.804442		-871208	
678	Manchuán, Isla	-45.637833	-74.911125		-892248	Menchuán, Isla Mensuan, Isla
679	Cabo Grande, Isla	-45.65803	-74.78787		-902609	Tenquehuén, Isla
680	Lillian, Isla	-45.66501	-73.865385		-889044	
681	Ana, Islote	-45.665222	-73.80447		-872150	
682	Diego, Islote	-45.666667	-73.866667		-879665	
683	Clemente, Isla	-45.683333	-74.6		-877498	
684	Lucía, Islotes	-45.683333	-74.15		-891067	
685	Víctor, Islote	-45.683333	-74.2		-904325	
686	Oelckers, Isla	-45.685708	-74.101799		-894005	
687	Juan, Isla	-45.687377	-74.472016		-885410	
688	Lucía, Islote	-45.696099	-74.135869		-891066	
689	Elena, Islote	-45.703336	-73.879108		-880708	
690	Inchín, Islas	-45.705625	-74.847656		-884935	
691	Los Tres Islotes	-45.707627	-74.241382		-890968	
692	Oelckers, Islas	-45.7	-74.1		39982	
693	Barranco, Isla	-45.714566	-74.192275		-873232	
694	Rojas, Isla	-45.719687	-73.74992		-899581	
695	Canquenes, Islas	-45.727872	-74.138784		-875110	
696	Bister, Isla	-45.733688	-74.860257		-873589	
697	Flor, Isla	-45.737945	-74.832435		-882701	
698	Black, Isla	-45.743588	-74.883394		-873593	
699	Medio, Islote	-45.744404	-73.79765		-892123	
700	Este, Isla	-45.753533	-73.691039		-882420	
701	Blanca, Roca	-45.753852	-73.805914		-873654	
702	Norte, Islote	-45.763365	-73.752018		-893825	
703	Flat, Isla	-45.764893	-74.812491		-882688	
704	Piuco, Isla	-45.765684	-73.869835		-896685	
705	Luis, Islote	-45.767349	-74.70336		-891079	
706	Bracey, Isla	-45.771496	-74.724735		-874003	
707	Centro, Islote	-45.775933	-73.75061		-876093	
708	Catalina, Islotes	-45.778012	-74.693097		-875825	
709	Medio, Islotes del	-45.781183	-74.787278		-892115	
710	Centro, Isla	-45.78212	-74.674652		-876088	
711	Guerrero, Isla	-45.783333	-74.516667		-883901	
712	Salas, Isla	-45.783568	-74.218958		-899937	
713	Figueroa, Isla	-45.786631	-73.635967		-882642	
714	Prieto, Isla	-45.790463	-74.373		-897257	
715	Pati, Isla	-45.793839	-73.663107		-895386	Paty, Isla
716	Julián, Isla	-45.794574	-74.875437		-885474	
717	Pengüin, Islote	-45.795279	-74.950324		-895745	Pengüin Mayor, Islote
718	Guillermo, Islote	-45.797481	-74.704768		-883924	
719	Ballena, Islotes	-45.80021	-74.670607		-873041	
720	Redonda, Isla	-45.800339	-74.711574		-898859	
721	Mitra, Isla	-45.802973	-74.83873		-892646	
722	Raimapu, Isla	-45.803192	-73.585219		-898634	
723	Entrada, Isla	-45.804119	-74.648779		-882090	
724	Pach, Isla	-45.80592	-74.836711		-895382	Patch, Isla
725	McPherson, Isla	-45.806143	-73.827709		-892050	McPierson, Isla
726	Sin Nombre, Isla	-45.80687	-74.399438		-901727	
727	Larga, Isla	-45.807994	-74.692821		-887459	
728	Fitz Roy, Isla	-45.817944	-73.989813		-882674	
729	Cabras, Isla de las	-45.8	-74.983333		-884934	Inche Inchemó, Isla Menahueque, Isla Meñan Meñauque, Isla de
730	Dirección, Isla	-45.820131	-74.773592		-879717	
731	Notable, Islote	-45.822029	-74.493295		-893868	
732	Ricardo, Isla	-45.823825	-74.463369		-899156	
733	Pups, Islotes	-45.836267	-74.848583		-897787	
734	Serrano, Islotes	-45.83958	-74.648902		-901552	
735	Christina, Isla	-45.850626	-73.899557		-878810	Cristina, Isla
736	Hyatt, Islotes	-45.85	-74.816667		-884787	
737	Seal, Islotes	-45.85	-75.016667		-901406	
738	Puentes, Isla	-45.863338	-74.822325		-897435	
739	Videla, Islote	-45.866667	-74.8		-904386	
740	Stewart, Isla	-45.886802	-74.077926		-902018	
741	Simpson, Isla	-45.887068	-73.826103		-901701	
742	Lira, Isla	-45.938982	-73.930579		-889162	Lyra, Isla
743	Los Mogotes	-45.947627	-73.647191		-890527	
744	Huemules, Isla	-45.965378	-73.719229		-884530	
745	Goñi, Isla	-45.97989	-73.964267		-883252	
746	Centro, Isla	-46.021219	-73.336001		-876089	
747	Oma, Isla	-46.047973	-73.654611		-894296	
748	Nalcayec, Isla	-46.085741	-73.793824		-893266	
749	San José, Isla	-46.111673	-73.906041		-900441	
750	Usborne, Islas	-46.172183	-74.987754		-903868	
751	Levican, Islas	-46.402907	-71.786438		-888962	
752	Leonor, Isla	-46.4	-73.783333		-888936	
753	Pelado, Islote	-46.4	-73.783333		-895582	
754	Huacha, Isla	-46.490987	-71.981488		-884393	
755	Escarpada, Isla	-46.506589	-74.962498		-882189	
756	Observación, Islote	-46.525052	-73.854911		-893956	
757	Entrada, Islote	-46.531253	-73.845706		-882096	
758	Verde, Isla	-46.537091	-71.967048		-904220	
759	Dirección, Islote	-46.538828	-73.845699		-879718	
760	Cono, Isla	-46.579803	-75.5098		-878333	
761	Rees, Isla	-46.6049	-75.615255		-898914	
762	Malvinas, Islas	-46.62207	-72.527198		-891502	
763	Amarillo, Islote	-46.666667	-75.5		-872108	
764	Eva, Isla	-46.671375	-75.205131		-882475	
765	Alex, Isla	-46.676915	-75.296424		-871714	
766	Adán, Isla	-46.680209	-75.15845		-871219	
767	Aramis, Isla	-46.682058	-75.229996		-872450	
768	Athos, Isla	-46.687765	-75.275661		-872759	
769	Chaicayán, Grupo	-46.688747	-75.244438		-876363	Chalcayan, Grupo Marina, Grupo Marinas, Islas
770	Término, Isla	-46.697458	-75.335659		-902638	
771	Hereford, Isla	-46.699904	-75.175841		-884084	
772	Porthos, Isla	-46.701924	-75.272015		-897050	
773	Macías, Isla	-46.704053	-72.57108		-891199	
774	Baja, Isla	-46.70597	-75.295303		-872965	
775	Pan de Azúcar, Isla	-46.710114	-75.241497		-894970	
776	Centro, Isla	-46.710846	-75.36329		-876090	
777	Redondo, Islote	-46.7	-75.55		-898904	
778	Frontón, Isla	-46.723979	-75.2483		-882885	
779	Esfinge, Isla	-46.729477	-75.260836		-882236	
780	Guía, Isla	-46.730037	-75.311637		-883911	
781	Julio, Islote	-46.733333	-75.55		-885484	
782	Hale, Isla	-46.737416	-75.107798		-883981	Haler, Isla Hales, Isla
783	Crosslet, Isla	-46.739391	-75.17244		-878820	
784	Gemelos, Islotes	-46.749673	-75.318945		-883138	
785	Waller, Isla	-46.776201	-75.228255		-904735	
786	Smith, Isla	-46.7781	-75.185182		-901772	
787	Diablo, Isla del	-46.780314	-74.330949		-879598	
788	Covadonga, Isla	-46.788512	-74.582758		-878748	
789	Entrada, Islas	-46.804208	-75.289376		-882095	Entrance, Islotes
790	Esmeralda, Isla	-46.822719	-74.538096		-882259	
791	Arbolada, Isla	-46.827055	-74.346987		-872484	
792	Nueva, Isla	-46.829035	-74.561896		-893894	
793	Block, Isla	-46.84119	-75.301784		-873788	
794	Redonda, Isla	-46.9163	-74.613372		-898860	
795	Chica, Isla	-46.91856	-74.614191		-876811	
796	Byron, Isla	-46.9	-74.383333		-874332	
797	Purcell, Isla	-46.927646	-74.587161		-897843	
798	Finfa, Isla	-46.939728	-74.60456		-882664	
799	Surania, Isla	-46.945451	-74.582605		-902133	
800	Boscosa, Isla	-46.964466	-74.003006		-873959	Boscoso, Isla
801	Sobrino, Islote	-47.036728	-74.253878		-901793	
802	Javier, Isla	-47.072965	-74.354083		-885296	
803	Arbusto, Islote	-47.120033	-74.345006		-872495	
804	Armando, Islote	-47	-74.133333		39663	
805	Maldonado, Isla	-47.151893	-74.195227		-891423	
806	Brañas, Isla	-47.163189	-74.226521		-874011	
807	Víctor, Isla	-47.17562	-72.115047		-904324	
808	Carlos Campo, Islas	-47.228677	-72.438859		-875372	Carlos Campos, Islas
809	Iris, Islote	-47.248619	-74.323726		-885094	
810	María Sofía, Isla	-47.256148	-72.070554		-891811	
811	Wilma, Isla	-47.283293	-72.032027		-904840	
812	Cachos, Islotes	-47.35	-74.466667		-874517	
813	Diana, Isla	-47.436173	-74.485559		-879628	
814	Hazard, Islas	-47.493045	-74.432221		-884050	
815	Elena, Grupo	-47.502298	-74.520196		-880704	
816	Carreño, Grupo	-47.512051	-74.580339		-875472	
817	Reyes, Grupo	-47.513074	-74.623116		-899140	
818	Ayautau, Islas	-47.579438	-74.729105		-872858	
819	Ayautau, Isla	-47.583333	-74.833333		39885	
820	Merino, Islotes	-47.605149	-74.663397		-892297	
821	Norte, Islote	-47.637815	-75.127488		-893826	
822	Rugged, Isla	-47.647432	-75.140392		-899801	
823	Ratones, Grupo	-47.664272	-75.055304		-898812	
824	Plato, Islote	-47.681884	-74.928117		-896770	
825	Solitario, Islote	-47.700247	-75.336163		-901873	
826	Madera, Isla	-47.709254	-75.324116		-892157	Medora, Isla
827	Albertina, Islas	-47.713052	-74.859384		-871627	
828	San Pedro, Isla	-47.716667	-74.916667		-900729	
829	Ramillete, Islote	-47.7	-74.95		-898682	
830	Guillermo, Isla	-47.72307	-74.875406		-883920	
831	Wager, Isla	-47.724303	-74.960179		-904714	
832	Schröder, Isla	-47.751152	-74.871367		-901378	
833	Vera, Isla	-47.75215	-74.416291		-904195	
834	Cleo, Isla	-47.764134	-74.217289		-877501	
835	Porvenir, Islote	-47.765806	-74.887396		-897078	
836	Jaures, Islote	-47.766667	-74.9		-885294	
837	Byron, Isla	-47.771407	-75.124821		-874333	
838	Guayaneco, Archipiélago	-47.773499	-75.035507		-883885	
839	García, Isla	-47.778338	-74.92868		-883047	
840	Sombrero, Isla	-47.778975	-74.674163		-901904	
841	Boers, Islas	-47.784511	-74.465586		-873824	
842	Patricia, Islote	-47.78472	-74.798524		-895421	
843	Irene, Isla	-47.787355	-74.074175		-885089	
844	Penguin, Isla	-47.795869	-74.779001		-895744	Penquin, Isla
845	Vigía, Islote	-47.796339	-73.649738		-904428	
846	Vesta, Islote	-47.801907	-74.025884		-904284	
847	Vicente, Isla	-47.813642	-74.420503		-904303	
848	Morgan, Isla	-47.816557	-73.583165		-892994	
849	Home, Islote	-47.8	-74.833333		-884221	
850	Gastón, Isla	-47.822678	-73.77835		-883089	
851	Teresa, Isla	-47.82366	-73.656747		-902630	
852	Tulio, Islote	-47.829018	-73.902728		-903671	
853	Berta, Isla	-47.833383	-73.833269		-873553	Berte, Isla
854	Porcia, Isla	-47.83364	-74.559725		-896992	
855	Zealous, Isla	-47.836374	-74.655975		-905155	
856	Briceño, Isla	-47.84183	-73.603197		-874061	Briseño, Isla
857	Barrios, Isla	-47.84307	-73.525944		-873283	
858	Carlos, Isla	-47.849378	-73.643852		-875363	
859	Lucano, Isla	-47.84952	-73.8769		-891051	
860	Merino Jarpa, Isla	-47.862157	-74.17581	430	-892306	
861	Baker, Islas	-47.86787	-74.606236		-873011	
862	Juan Stuven, Isla	-47.889441	-74.846876		-885448	
863	Tito, Isla	-47.890781	-74.586514		-902839	
864	Scout, Isla	-47.900282	-74.650342		-901393	
865	Chang, Isla	-47.902418	-74.74126		-876555	
866	Jungfrauen, Islas	-47.90858	-75.2011		-885512	
867	Orlebar, Isla	-47.9178	-74.568239		-894378	
868	Scylla, Isla	-47.922216	-74.644776		-901397	
869	Alert, Isla	-47.934625	-74.641937		-871709	
870	Billard, Islotes	-47.942285	-74.609055		-873579	
871	Mimí, Islote	-47.956048	-73.810432		-892472	
872	Jungfrauen, Isla	-47.956625	-75.072792		39719	
873	Rómulo, Isla	-47.957462	-73.875124		-899655	
874	Millar, Isla	-47.958662	-74.720068		-892438	
875	Alberto Vargas, Isla	-47.960195	-73.670991		-871630	
876	Remo, Isla	-47.971052	-73.847163		-899003	
877	Rosa, Isla	-47.983353	-73.713097		-899665	
878	Edmundo, Islotes	-47.988496	-73.647348		-880061	
879	Bynoe, Islas	-47.989247	-75.350607		-874327	
880	Rosina, Islote	-47.989915	-73.690856		-899723	
881	Edith, Isla	-48.013676	-75.220429		-880059	
882	Pipo, Islote	-48.014704	-73.931591		-896569	
883	Rocky, Islotes	-48.015721	-75.438885		-899526	
884	Royal Oak, Isla	-48.024299	-74.717416		-899752	
885	Úrsula, Isla	-48.028432	-75.11973		-903864	
886	Ursula, Isla	-48.028502	-75.133368		39720	
887	Breaksea, Isla	-48.030911	-75.452858		-874045	
888	Thora, Isla	-48.033333	-75.316667		-902687	
889	Amelia, Isla	-48.045432	-73.79881		-872122	
890	Kluverbaum, Isla	-48.055289	-75.273655		-885609	
891	Chafer, Isla	-48.061152	-74.725494		-901369	Schafer, Isla
892	Phipps, Islote	-48.066667	-74.633333		-896051	
893	Valdés, Isla	-48.066667	-73.816667		-903918	
894	María, Isla	-48.067077	-75.33078		-891792	
895	Hornby, Isla	-48.070435	-74.771157		-884311	
896	Francisco, Isla	-48.07517	-73.576982		-882819	
897	Brown, Islote	-48.081229	-74.575156		-874103	
898	Ech, Isla	-48.111872	-74.693848		-880043	
899	Mikosch, Isla	-48.117127	-74.686636		-892406	
900	Blanca, Isla	-48.118268	-75.24825		-873608	
901	Lizard, Isla	-48.1	-74.616667		-889214	
902	Ester, Isla	-48.12047	-73.546644		-882433	
903	Clara, Isla	-48.132936	-73.534731		-877467	Lulú, Isla
904	Gallardo, Isla	-48.153707	-75.209246		-882981	
905	Schlucht, Isla	-48.15427	-74.787793		-901372	
906	Faro, Isla	-48.16807	-73.502466		-882583	
907	Campana, Isla	-48.182995	-75.313412	1187.8	-874903	
908	Agnes, Isla	-48.193754	-74.756918		-871261	
909	Prat, Isla	-48.223059	-74.953466	760.8	-897241	
910	Justiniano, Isla	-48.236216	-74.292227		-885551	
911	Golondrina, Isla	-48.254984	-74.433032		-904035	Van der Meulen, Isla
912	Nimrod, Isla	-48.264974	-75.494761		-893717	
913	Caldcleugh, Isla	-48.341539	-74.279307		-874666	Caldeleugh, Isla
914	Torpedo, Isla	-48.352678	-75.542431		-903075	
915	Arturo, Isla	-48.404333	-74.52831		-872658	
916	Ofhidro, Isla	-48.409972	-74.094413		-894018	
917	Néstor, Isla	-48.416667	-75.15		-893617	
918	Farguhar, Isla	-48.460185	-74.345784		-882589	Farquar, Isla Farquhar, Isla
919	Murdoch, Isla	-48.460936	-74.426484		-893182	
920	Middle, Isla	-48.477244	-74.453139		-892387	
921	Pirula, Isla	-48.491607	-74.966946		-896618	
922	Pomar, Isla	-48.496125	-74.232379		-896957	
923	Goicolea, Isla	-48.510939	-75.018906		-883217	
924	Little Wellington	-48.532351	-74.775573	1062.8	-901551	Serrano, Isla
925	Boxer, Isla	-48.535584	-74.323797		-873992	
926	Hillyar, Isla	-48.539392	-74.532667		-884191	
927	Patricio Lynch, Isla	-48.571205	-75.372589	561	-895422	
928	Seal, Islotes	-48.598317	-74.385444		-901407	
929	Circel, Islote	-48.598577	-74.959042		-877439	
930	Lotten, Isla	-48.612961	-74.838619		-891009	
931	Midge, Isla	-48.617631	-74.38811		-892396	
932	Seal, Islote	-48.633333	-74.416667		-901405	
933	Campana, Archipiélago	-48.634157	-75.330973	1187.8	-874886	
934	Knor, Isla	-48.649928	-74.886363		-885614	Knorr, Isla
935	Dirección, Islotes	-48.671145	-74.403734		-879722	
936	Riquelme, Isla	-48.672127	-75.269699		-899416	
937	Cúpula, Isla	-48.674774	-75.608449		-879167	
938	Cabrales, Isla	-48.675118	-75.378541		-874401	
939	Launch, Isla	-48.681959	-74.327956		-888613	
940	Aldea, Isla	-48.710171	-75.077892	202.1	-871677	
941	Ernesto, Isla	-48.714188	-75.264192		-882142	
942	Ricardo, Isla	-48.714978	-75.203865		-899157	
943	Schröder, Isla	-48.728431	-74.557958		-901379	Schroder, Isla
944	Cabrera, Isla	-48.730311	-75.210562		-874417	
945	Williams, Isla	-48.745101	-74.368852		-904832	
946	Héctor, Isla	-48.746071	-75.436839		-884059	
947	Adolfo, Isla	-48.75006	-75.234485		-871241	
948	Louasen, Isla	-48.752274	-74.980987		-891010	Louisen, Isla
949	Armando, Isla	-48.7555	-74.974524		-872586	
950	Hyatt, Isla	-48.758093	-75.372709		-884786	
951	Oregon, Islote	-48.759645	-75.282063		-894334	
952	Bunster, Islotes	-48.766667	-74.383333		-874260	
953	Videla, Isla	-48.786762	-75.292757		-904385	
954	Central, Isla	-48.78705	-72.882685		-876080	
955	Marcus, Isla	-48.789392	-74.441716		-891762	
956	Ofelia, Isla	-48.803142	-75.464925		-894015	
957	Chica, Isla	-48.833333	-73		-876812	
958	Daly, Isla	-48.858781	-74.448788		-879360	
959	Pass, Islas	-48.86522	-75.018213		-895315	
960	Mesing, Isla	-48.870899	-74.982128		-892327	
961	Orella, Isla	-48.889447	-75.125073		-894342	
962	Notable, Grupo	-48.891176	-75.653337		-893867	
963	Vittorio, Isla	-48.90209	-74.367173		-904628	
964	Esmeralda, Isla	-48.902245	-75.413226	515.2	-882260	
965	Walkyria, Isla	-48.912058	-74.947869		-904731	
966	Herzer, Islote	-48.912641	-74.966206		-884130	
967	Gröden, Isla	-48.913645	-75.010033		-883492	Grönden, Isla
968	Moat, Isla	-48.91493	-74.417449		-892653	Mouat, Islas
969	Observación, Isla	-48.916667	-74.383333		-893955	
970	Julia, Isla	-48.918012	-74.349514		-885463	
971	Armijen	-48.918397	-74.376102		-872593	Armingen, Islas Armington
972	Ignacio, Isla	-48.920158	-75.641369		-884845	
973	Hume, Isla	-48.922183	-74.405138		-884746	
974	Isabel, Isla	-48.926897	-74.376138		-885111	
975	Thomas, Isla	-48.929606	-74.405039		-902682	
976	Green, Isla	-48.933333	-74.366667		-883459	
977	Lamarmera, Isla	-48.938305	-74.40532		-886856	Lamarmora, Isla Marmora, Isla la
978	Haycock, Islote	-48.95	-74.433333		-884045	
979	Loney, Islote	-48.95	-74.433333		-889708	
980	Cavour, Isla	-48.952433	-74.3901		-875939	
981	Disraeli, Isla	-48.962043	-74.382122		-879736	
982	Ida, Isla	-48.966198	-74.978513		-884820	
983	Bushy, Isla	-48.966667	-74.433333		-874303	
984	Dimsey, Islote	-48.966667	-74.416667		-879696	
985	Patagonia, Isla	-48.966667	-74.433333		-895359	
986	Clío, Islote	-48.983333	-74.45		-877508	
987	Medio Canal, Isla	-48.983333	-74.45		-892154	Mid-channel Islet
988	Barton, Isla	-48.984497	-74.370899		-873323	
989	Craft, Isla	-48.98834	-74.429016		-878814	Crofft Croft, Islas
990	Lavinia, Isla	-48.988652	-75.011483		-888732	
991	Chinnock, Isla	-49.002948	-74.421081		-877040	
992	Kitt, Isla	-49.01384	-74.425609		-885607	
993	Covadonga, Isla	-49.014605	-75.555452		-878749	
994	Grande de Wellington, Isla	-49.033058	-74.622706	5555.7	-904769	Great Wellington Island Wellington, Isla
995	Western, Isla	-49.048014	-75.683539		-904778	
996	Marta, Isla	-49.060198	-75.581976		-891874	
997	Adam	-49.086127	-74.410015		-871220	Adán, Isla
998	Stosch, Isla	-49.093423	-75.427468	357.3	-902045	
999	Ollard, Islas	-49.100999	-74.393047		-894284	
1000	Staude, Isla	-49.107522	-75.210884		-901999	
1001	Carlos, Isla	-49.108388	-75.628345		-875364	
1002	Salamandra, Isla	-49.116596	-74.388076		-899926	
1003	Angamos, Isla	-49.116667	-75	447.7	-872266	
1004	Harm, Islote	-49.116667	-74.433333		-884025	
1005	Harwood, Isla	-49.116667	-74.416667		-884036	
1006	Japhet, Islote	-49.116667	-74.416667		-885244	
1007	Tree, Islote	-49.116667	-74.433333		-903349	
1008	Henry, Isla	-49.118372	-74.38049		-884074	
1009	Becerra, Islote	-49.1	-74.433333		-873431	
1010	Bishop, Isla	-49.1	-74.433333		-873586	
1011	Redondo, Islote	-49.1	-75.483333		-898905	
1012	Morton, Isla	-49.128526	-74.390825		-893057	
1013	Edén, Isla	-49.13214	-74.416237		-880055	
1014	Bryer, Islotes	-49.133333	-74.433333		-874119	
1015	Round, Islote	-49.133333	-74.433333		-899741	
1016	Shem, Islote	-49.133333	-74.433333		-901585	
1017	Eva, Isla	-49.134435	-74.384282		-882476	
1018	Hansa, Isla	-49.136477	-75.255681		-884012	
1019	Dulce, Isla	-49.137943	-74.39988		-879969	
1020	Armanda, Isla	-49.141555	-75.32164		-872585	
1021	Carlos, Isla	-49.143912	-74.404594		-875365	
1022	Levison, Islote	-49.15	-74.416667		-888964	
1023	Stubbenkammer, Isla	-49.15577	-75.268637		-902051	
1024	Arturo, Isla	-49.162754	-75.641582		-872659	
1025	Guía, Islas	-49.168596	-74.362269		-883914	
1026	Wallace, Isla	-49	-74.466667		-904732	
1027	Zealous, Islote	-49	-74.45		-905156	
1028	Montague, Isla	-49.194802	-75.674914		-892838	
1029	Camello, Isla	-49.195362	-75.408233		-874842	
1030	Marta, Isla	-49.199351	-74.393364		-891875	
1031	Wellington, Archipiélago	-49.209785	-75.023049		-904768	
1032	Vitalia, Isla	-49.210251	-74.397636		-904621	
1033	Petters, Isla	-49.213227	-75.302116		-896007	
1034	Chipana, Isla	-49.216452	-75.130346		-877058	
1035	Drechsler, Isla	-49.231943	-75.311668		-879934	Drechster, Isla
1036	Hermanas, Islas	-49.233333	-74.383333		-884086	
1037	Covadonga, Grupo	-49.235868	-74.386163		-878747	
1038	Bouquet, Islita	-49.247896	-74.377785		-873987	
1039	Perch, Islote	-49.25	-74.4		-895868	
1040	Toro, Islote	-49.25	-74.4		-903033	
1041	Crossover, Isla	-49.275445	-74.381234		-878821	Grossover, Isla
1042	Fantome, Isla	-49.291393	-74.382738		-882558	
1043	Gregorio, Islas	-49.320524	-74.351731		-883469	Gregory, Islotes
1044	Varposten, Grupo	-49.346197	-75.67291		39918	
1045	Von Schroeders, Islote	-49.346514	-75.531007		-904701	
1046	Huber, Islote	-49.35564	-75.527162		-884452	
1047	García, Grupo	-49.37391	-75.478248		-883044	
1048	Foot, Isla	-49.381065	-74.395177		-882754	
1049	Raúl, Islote	-49.385009	-75.47653		-898819	
1050	Rivera, Isla	-49.392028	-75.477993		-899454	
1051	Alau, Isla	-49.406589	-75.500804		-885555	Kalau, Isla
1052	Latitud, Isla	-49.425431	-75.446642		-888537	
1053	Cloué, Islote	-49.430153	-74.309121		-877514	Clove, Isla
1054	Diamante, Isla	-49.433333	-74.316667		-879621	
1055	Offshore, Islote	-49.434104	-75.648063		-894017	
1056	Rule, Islas	-49.436643	-74.411235		-899807	
1057	Tang, Isla	-49.437494	-75.445245		-902411	
1058	Bachem, Isla	-49.455522	-75.437611		-872929	
1059	Sherris, Islotes	-49.46043	-74.428813		-901591	
1060	North, Archipiélago	-49.466667	-75.5		-893855	
1061	Taggart, Isla	-49.468326	-75.480871		-902236	
1062	Conner, Isla	-49.470913	-74.441203		-878324	Connor, Isla O’Connor, Isla
1063	Sicht, Islote	-49.4744	-75.398179		-901610	
1064	Gertie, Isla	-49.478473	-75.008421		-883174	
1065	Centro, Isla	-49.500635	-74.442529		-876091	
1066	Saumarez, Isla	-49.524118	-74.342212		-901358	
1067	Girard, Isla	-49.532741	-75.341056		-883188	
1068	Merino, Isla	-49.544916	-75.404932		-892298	
1069	Ema, Isla	-49.548764	-75.373996		-882016	Emma, Isla
1070	Angle, Isla	-49.551132	-74.441579		-872282	
1071	Titi, Isla	-49.5634	-75.295715		-902833	
1072	Gerd, Islitas	-49.564792	-75.35887		-883169	
1073	Troncoso, Isla	-49.570564	-75.495419		-903576	
1074	García, Isla	-49.571558	-75.457692		-883048	
1075	Toro, Isla	-49.576595	-75.539683		-903029	
1076	Larga, Isla	-49.578069	-75.273809		-887460	
1077	Zavala, Isla	-49.578426	-75.475589		-905153	
1078	Zero, Islote	-49.588077	-75.308331		-905177	
1079	Malvinen, Isla	-49.593934	-74.941101		-891504	
1080	Seater, Isla	-49.610653	-74.320138		-901416	
1081	Malvinen, Islas	-49.6	-74.95		-891505	
1082	Blanca, Islote	-49.636456	-74.343316		-873612	
1083	Mason, Isla	-49.643448	-74.344983		-891908	
1084	Maria, Isla	-49.665606	-74.398208		-891824	Marie, Isla
1085	Dulfón, Islas	-49.689787	-74.383588		-880033	Dutton, Islas
1086	Mornington, Isla	-49.695513	-75.359562	529	-893003	
1087	Hermina, Isla	-49.740591	-74.205086		-884092	Herminia, Isla
1088	Mornington, Archipiélago	-49.75	-75.333333		-893002	
1089	Negro, lslote	-49.762197	-75.415866		-893539	
1090	Isabel, Islote	-49.766529	-74.284074		-885114	
1091	Knob, Isla	-49.77609	-75.64081		-885611	
1092	Corso, Isla	-49.782573	-75.392557		-878638	
1093	Carmela, Islote	-49.782781	-74.309597		-875379	
1094	Adelaida, Islote	-49.789142	-74.311181		-871229	
1095	Julia, Isla	-49.791277	-74.270954		-885464	
1096	Jones, Islas	-49.795304	-74.310876		-885342	
1097	Rosa, Isla	-49.799084	-74.298795		-899666	
1098	Celia, Isla	-49.8	-74.283333		-875989	
1099	Francisco José, Isla	-49.8	-74.3		-882827	
1100	Horacio, Isla	-49.8	-74.283333		-884293	
1101	Nueva, Isla	-49.8	-74.283333		-893895	
1102	Chico, Islote	-49.827703	-75.551746		-876846	
1103	Bajo, Islote	-49.833333	-75.416667		-872995	
1104	Doble, Islote	-49.834805	-75.399623		-879776	
1105	Shag, Isla	-49.85861	-75.359723		-901570	
1106	May, Islotes	-49.8592	-75.241579		-892015	
1107	Gemelos, Islotes	-49.866667	-75.4		-883139	Jemelos, Islotes
1108	Herminia, Isla	-49.866667	-74.433333		-884093	
1109	Pullen, Islote	-49.866667	-75.233333		-897581	
1110	Knocker, Islote	-49.868285	-75.231714		-885613	
1111	Luxor, Isla	-49.87103	-75.103578		-891133	
1112	Spider, Islote	-49.878716	-75.212222		-901976	
1113	Deadera, Isla	-49.879707	-75.074733		-879464	Denderah, Isla
1114	Button, Islote	-49.883333	-75.216667		-874322	
1115	Medio, Isla del	-49.883333	-74.433333		-892120	
1116	Woecan, Isla	-49.886419	-75.090182		-904863	
1117	Wilson, Islote	-49.89052	-74.406628		-904851	
1118	Memphis, Isla	-49.896862	-75.07832		-892244	
1119	Rameses, Islas	-49.900279	-75.167171		-898681	
1120	Schweers, Islote	-49.911652	-75.078124		-901383	
1121	Meidel, Islas	-49.912882	-75.021112		-892162	
1122	Aldrich, Islotes	-49.9	-75.216667		-871683	
1123	Green, Isla	-49.9	-75.283333		-883455	
1124	Van, Islas	-49.929771	-75.179729		-904031	
1125	Occidental, Grupo	-49.933333	-75.183333		-893981	
1126	Oriental, Grupo	-49.933333	-75.133333		-894352	
1127	Malaspina, Islas	-49.950111	-75.032344		-891419	
1128	Aragón, Islotes	-49.985491	-75.372331		-872617	Arragon, Isla Arragón, Islotes Arragor, Islas
1129	Seymour, Islas	-49.993463	-75.3301		-901568	
1130	Fisher, Isla	-49.998252	-75.263167		-882671	
1131	Antonio, Islas	-50.000831	-74.884621		-872384	
1132	Byatt, Isla	-50.002778	-75.187778		-874324	
1133	Elmes, Isla	-50.010556	-75.175833		-881110	
1134	Sea, Islote	-50.012222	-75.054167		-901400	
1135	Hernando, Islas	-50.014722	-75.079722		-884103	
1136	Smallwood, Islas	-50.015278	-75.150833		-901770	
1137	Low, Islote	-50.016667	-75.333333		-891033	
1138	Richardson, Isla	-50.016667	-75.15		-899164	
1139	Látimer, Isla	-50.018487	-75.252522		-888529	
1140	Jane, Isla	-50.018889	-75.361667		-885234	
1141	Antón, Islotes	-50.020833	-75.058889		-872382	
1142	Rose, Isla	-50.021329	-75.128868		-899720	
1143	Pilot, Isla	-50.03913	-75.040399		-896456	
1144	Petley, Islas	-50.05	-74.866667		-895987	
1145	Camel, Isla	-50.055406	-74.749536		-874839	
1146	North, Isla	-50.055623	-74.996122		-893857	
1147	Burges, Isla	-50.056268	-74.81001		-874270	Burgess, Isla
1148	Grant, Isla	-50.057084	-75.025744		-883435	
1149	Middle, Isla	-50.064819	-75.005109		-892388	
1150	Morgan, Isla	-50.066111	-75.023056		-892995	
1151	División, Islas	-50.074915	-75.019988		-879768	
1152	Great, Isla	-50.077492	-75.005303		-883448	
1153	Redbill, Islas	-50.086343	-74.899037		-898855	
1154	Sur, Isla	-50.091418	-75.018844		-902113	
1155	Joist, Islote	-50.095862	-74.861677		-885340	
1156	Topar, Isla	-50.096728	-74.709687		-902967	
1157	Medio, Isla	-50.097607	-74.800345		-892119	
1158	Rugga, Islotes	-50.099404	-75.512546		-899799	
1159	Dirección, Islotes	-50.101345	-75.447305		-879723	
1160	Madre de Dios, Isla	-50.102778	-75.243889	1043	-891233	
1161	Flat, Isla	-50.111528	-75.041868		-882689	
1162	Breakwater, Islas	-50.112597	-74.885386		-874046	
1163	Hardin, Isla	-50.112829	-74.859045		-884019	Harding, Isla
1164	Arthur, Islas	-50.123703	-74.628462		-872643	
1165	Moreton, Islote	-50.125863	-74.70561		-892992	
1166	Redonda, Isla	-50.1327	-75.452233		-898861	
1167	Hero, Isla	-50.144444	-75.265278		-884105	
1168	Gort, Isla	-50.145791	-74.765755		-883305	
1169	Leandro, Isla	-50.148971	-75.264427		-888789	
1170	Tower, Islote	-50.150833	-75.414167		-903198	
1171	Fortunata, Islas	-50.156679	-75.497406		-882781	
1172	Mabel, Islotes	-50.157214	-74.756969		-891150	
1173	Cecil, Isla	-50.160115	-74.771905		-875982	
1174	Iris, Isla	-50.166667	-74.5		-885093	
1175	Renato, Isla	-50.168611	-75.203889		-899033	
1176	Fletcher, Isla	-50.183333	-74.8		-882694	
1177	Maine, Islote	-50.183333	-74.783333		-891292	Mayne, Isla
1178	Rat, Islote	-50.183333	-74.783333		-898801	
1179	Scot, Islote	-50.183333	-74.8		-901385	
1180	Single Tree, Islote	-50.183333	-74.783333		-901711	
1181	Unit, Islote	-50.183333	-74.8		-903837	
1182	Vallack, Isla	-50.183333	-74.8		-903974	
1183	Voke, Isla	-50.183333	-74.816667		-904685	
1184	Wingate, Islote	-50.183333	-74.783333		-904858	
1185	Parry, Isla	-50.189229	-74.797354		-895258	
1186	Centinela, Islote	-50	-75.35		-901527	Sentry, Islote
1187	Stratford, Isla	-50.194173	-74.799123		-902048	
1188	Child, Islote	-50.204586	-74.811013		-876916	
1189	Ramón, Isla	-50.211334	-75.218887		-898693	
1190	Devenish, Islote	-50.211359	-74.812487		-879579	Devinish, Islote
1191	David, Islotes	-50.216667	-74.783333		-879399	
1192	Mather, Isla	-50.216667	-74.8		-891965	
1193	Melizos, Islotes	-50.218383	-75.483249		-892215	Mellizos, Islotes
1194	Centre, Islote	-50.2	-74.8		-876084	
1195	Chaine, Isla	-50.234542	-74.851353		-876380	
1196	George, Isla	-50.240802	-74.70688		-885353	Jorge, Isla Jorje, Isla
1197	Guillermo, Isla	-50.249708	-75.435969		-883921	
1198	Portland, Isla	-50.254947	-74.746405		-897064	
1199	Drummond Hay, Isla	-50.256511	-74.881765		-879945	
1200	Tall Tree, Islote	-50.260091	-74.719216		-902330	
1201	Madre de Dios, Archipiélago	-50.272409	-75.207868		-891232	
1202	Moraine, Islas	-50.27787	-74.734579		-892966	
1203	Sombrero, Grupo	-50.295278	-75.498333		-901903	
1204	Canning, Isla	-50.29808	-74.670156		-875096	
1205	Anafur, Isla	-50.317222	-75.001667		-898603	Raby, Isla
1206	Rómulo, Isla	-50.3	-74.866667		-899656	
1207	Sabugo, Isla	-50.35107	-75.32854		-899849	
1208	Corbeta, Isla	-50.356103	-75.333573		-878482	
1209	Ruiz, Islas	-50.3575	-75.343889		-899805	
1210	Bascuñán, Isla	-50.358888	-75.289382		-873326	
1211	López, Isla	-50.359724	-75.331125		-889765	
1212	Rodado, Islote	-50.360549	-75.547102		-899536	
1213	Lucha, Islote	-50.375521	-75.538947		-891060	
1214	Aviso, Islotes	-50.378175	-75.285302		-872850	
1215	Guarello, Isla	-50.3853	-75.352853		-883834	
1216	Wake, Islote	-50.385989	-74.935481		-904719	
1217	Culling, Isla	-50.39166	-74.759221		-879080	Culling del Sur, Isla
1218	Middle, Islas	-50.399191	-74.755667		-892390	
1219	Kentish, Islas	-50.400809	-74.441077		-885582	
1220	Tarlton, Isla	-50.408931	-75.440712		-902473	
1221	Kay, Isla	-50.410019	-75.353198		-885564	
1222	Holmes, Isla	-50.410194	-74.961765		-884220	
1223	Cerda, Isla	-50.413407	-75.36059		-876116	
1224	García, Isla	-50.413818	-75.019794		-883049	
1225	Bone, Isla	-50.416667	-74.733333		-873878	
1226	Bun, Islote	-50.416667	-74.75		-874259	
1227	Figueroa, Isla	-50.416724	-74.674597		-882643	
1228	Stud, Islote	-50.4	-74.766667		-902054	
1229	Ángel, Isla	-50.425586	-75.385938		-872271	
1230	Hocico de Caimán, Isla	-50.428479	-74.975872		-884206	
1231	Caracciola, Isla	-50.430553	-75.141883		-875194	Caracciolo, Isla
1232	Bush, Isla	-50.433333	-74.95		-874302	
1233	Rocky, Islote	-50.433333	-74.783333		-899525	
1234	Juan Largo, Islote	-50.434665	-75.515986		-885439	
1235	Charles, Islotes	-50.436053	-74.799575		-876654	
1236	Escribano, Isla	-50.443226	-75.048639		-882232	
1237	Entrada, Islote	-50.445295	-75.353062		-882097	
1238	Rat, Islote	-50.452221	-75.01082		-898802	
1239	Rossi, Isla	-50.454526	-75.21114		-899732	
1240	Calabrés, Isla	-50.454722	-75.258056		-874633	
1241	Cono, Islote	-50.455399	-75.296341		-878334	
1242	Shelter, Islote	-50.459722	-75.008611		-901584	
1243	Gemelos, Islotes	-50.459756	-75.483383		-883140	
1244	Chance, Islas	-50.460047	-74.786291		-876512	Chanco, Isla
1245	Conejo, Isla	-50.46133	-75.466928		-878288	
1246	Santa Rosa, Isla	-50.464593	-75.22196		-901149	
1247	Bonucci, Islotes	-50.466667	-75.183333		-873908	
1248	Cat, Isla	-50.466667	-75		-875810	
1249	Izzo, Islote	-50.466667	-75.2		-885200	
1250	Messina, Islote	-50.466667	-75.2		-892332	
1251	Tito, Islotes	-50.467222	-75.193056		-902842	
1252	Pasaje, Isla	-50.468113	-75.102175		-895268	
1253	Locos, Islotes	-50.468627	-75.304111		-889553	
1254	Denaro, Isla	-50.469702	-75.20704		-879462	
1255	Centro, Islote	-50.470833	-75.277778		-876092	
1256	Maggi, Islotes	-50.472354	-75.222186		-891265	
1257	Guía, Islotes	-50.473889	-75.278611		-883915	
1258	Caffiero, Islote	-50.475556	-75.165278		-874537	Cafiero, Islote
1259	Gaeta, Isla	-50.476807	-75.208097		-882953	
1260	Roncas, Islotes	-50.477504	-75.196098		-899660	
1261	Saboya, Isla	-50.478191	-75.098916		-899848	
1262	Robert, Isla	-50.544959	-74.62619		-899475	
1263	Inocentes, Isla	-50.549432	-74.854804		-885042	
1264	Infernet, Islotes	-50.558132	-74.892702		-884983	
1265	Beltrán, Isla	-50.560658	-74.508567		-873511	
1266	Wheeler, Islotes	-50.565506	-74.737701		-904791	
1267	Hope, Islotes	-50.567012	-74.833494		-884285	
1268	Verde, Isla	-50.576731	-75.165978		-904221	
1269	Pierre, Islotes	-50.587518	-74.985276		-896367	
1270	Duque de York, Isla	-50.605228	-75.313902	522	-879997	
1271	Ordenance, Grupo	-50.621032	-74.627235		-894327	
1272	Lobos, Grupo Islas	-50.632283	-74.984991		-885153	
1273	Negro, Islote	-50.642272	-75.458359		-893536	
1274	Froilán, Isla	-50.645336	-74.912265		-882883	
1275	Toro, Isla	-50.648749	-74.777834		-903030	
1276	Blaize, Isla	-50.649897	-74.729456		-873786	Blaze, Islotes
1277	Senos, Islote	-50.65	-75.516667		-901524	
1278	Clemente, Grupo	-50.65405	-74.846592		-877500	Clements, Grupo
1279	Juan, Isla	-50.660365	-74.617916		-885411	
1280	Redondo, Islote	-50.664841	-75.510531		-898906	
1281	Blanca, Isla	-50.668535	-75.231769		-873609	
1282	Long, Islas	-50.669203	-74.577227		-889709	
1283	Chatham, Isla	-50.682544	-74.351786	696	-876684	
1284	Chela, Isla	-50.690168	-75.41713		-876743	
1285	Julia, Isla	-50.71611	-75.243332		-885465	
1286	Daños, Isla	-50.723998	-75.023375		-879840	Doñas, Isla
1287	Guard, Isla	-50.733731	-74.513371		-883822	
1288	Negra, Isla	-50.734167	-75.241944		-893388	
1289	Yunque, Islote	-50.74074	-75.453106		-905065	
1290	Banny, Isla	-50.742546	-74.478901		-873907	Bonny, Isla
1291	Buenaventura, Isla	-50.753949	-75.134363		-874165	
1292	Luz, Isla	-50.757213	-74.672998		-891136	
1293	Grande, Isla	-50.763978	-74.655072		-883363	
1294	Cachorro, Islotes	-50.783032	-75.118081		-874515	Cachorros, Islotes
1295	Escala Alta, Isla	-50.784158	-74.433701		-882162	
1296	Farrel, Isla	-50.792602	-74.813448	324.9	-882592	
1297	Milne, Grupo	-50.807231	-74.405474		-892463	
1298	Constantino, Isla	-50.814497	-74.94065		-878355	
1299	Penacho, Islote	-50.829083	-74.981673		-895707	
1300	Peel, Isla	-50.833333	-74.116667		-895514	
1301	Göschen, Isla	-50.865747	-74.295912		-883306	
1302	Canales, Isla de los	-50.880442	-74.339274		-879898	Dos Canales, Isla
1303	Sombrero Ladeado, Isla	-50.886551	-74.289795		-901910	
1304	Visible, Isla	-50.910898	-74.64546		-904599	
1305	Bonduca, Isla	-50.919098	-74.279613		-873877	
1306	Alto, Isla	-50.93313	-75.072952		-871953	
1307	Hanover, Isla	-50.956199	-74.714084	812	-884011	
1308	Arístides, Isla	-50.96348	-74.977084		-872582	
1309	Hosking, Isla	-50.988253	-74.233339		-884367	Hoskins, Isla
1310	Solar, Isla	-50.991984	-75.010767		-901837	
1311	Pounds, Islote	-50.993424	-74.228503		-897191	
1312	Frödden, Isla	-51.014986	-74.897825		-882881	
1313	Pagel, Islotes	-51.085021	-74.177719		-894588	Paget, Islotes
1314	Esperanza, Isla	-51.097577	-74.24897		-882315	
1315	Edelmira, Isla	-51.124166	-74.198935		-880053	
1316	Lucía, Isla	-51.132082	-74.153911		-891065	Luois, Isla
1317	Valenzuela, Isla	-51.133107	-74.910872		-903958	
1318	Caballo Blanco, Isla	-51.143709	-75.09853		-904802	White Horse, Isla
1319	Armonía, Isla	-51.147359	-74.647983		-872594	
1320	Presidente Gabriel González Videla, Isla	-51.159282	-74.489395		-897250	
1321	Duncan, Isla	-51.165179	-75.280409		-879980	
1322	Hanover, Archipiélago de	-51.166667	-74.833333		-884009	
1323	Cónica, Isla	-51.179707	-75.278565		-878300	
1324	Dagnino, Isla	-51.194231	-74.922706		-879345	
1325	Soffia, Isla	-51.216667	-74.466667		-901817	
1326	Rogers, Isla	-51.23483	-74.367203		-899570	
1327	Hays, Grupo	-51.243972	-74.180945		-884049	
1328	Augusta, Isla	-51.244013	-75.087726		-872794	
1329	Bell, Isla	-51.25	-74.5		-873448	
1330	Medio, Isla del	-51.279219	-74.372851		-892121	
1331	Agustín, Isla	-51.281921	-74.96151		-871536	
1332	Evans, Isla	-51.286001	-74.016342		-882483	
1333	Jorge Montt, Isla	-51.288644	-74.757702	537	-885368	
1334	Whidbey, Isla	-51.290243	-74.156455		-904794	
1335	Owen, Islas	-51.304647	-73.807995		-894479	Owens, Islas
1336	Carmona, Isla	-51.3	-74.466667		-875426	
1337	Eclipse, Isla	-51.321926	-74.091162		-880051	
1338	Boina, Isla	-51.329667	-75.22433		-873831	
1339	Owen, Isla	-51.338276	-73.744641		-894478	
1340	Vancouver, Isla	-51.364641	-74.170398		-904033	
1341	Coronel Madrid, Isla	-51.377195	-74.3475		-878565	Madrid, Isla
1342	Macizo, Islote	-51.378929	-75.201832		-891203	
1343	Solari, Grupo	-51.383333	-74.333333		-901839	
1344	El Morro, Isla	-51.391722	-74.957826		-881211	
1345	Gruta, Islote	-51.394158	-75.229941		-883518	
1346	Daroch, Isla	-51.396164	-74.700287		-879380	
1347	Cambridge, Isla	-51.403959	-75.160461	376	-879670	Diego de Almagro, Isla
1348	Tortuga, Isla	-51.445643	-75.050838		-903135	
1349	Doble Pico, Isla	-51.447924	-73.975306		-879780	Double Peak Island
1350	Ploma, Isla	-51.455324	-75.080953		-896801	
1351	Carmela, Grupo	-51.459808	-74.536956		-875378	
1352	Rowley, Islas	-51.462334	-73.981476		-899751	
1353	Nef, Isla	-51.469565	-74.811167		-893381	Neff, Isla Net, Isla
1354	Tres Ratas, Islotes	-51.474335	-74.890972		-903478	
1355	Negro, Islote	-51.480454	-74.650435		-893537	
1356	Locos, Islotes	-51.483333	-74.15		-889554	
1357	Rowley, Isla	-51.483333	-73.983333		-899750	
1358	Gómez Carreño, Isla	-51.484116	-74.863972		-883248	
1359	Locos, Isla	-51.485241	-74.1391		-889551	
1360	Becerra, Grupo	-51.492937	-74.18843		-873428	
1361	Orión, Grupo	-51.500615	-75.063444		-894374	
1362	Virtudes, Isla	-51.50955	-74.94214		-904594	
1363	Medio, Isla del	-51.510832	-75.089989		-892122	
1364	López, Grupo	-51.511887	-74.190301		-889764	
1365	Laipe, Islas	-51.51346	-75.05066		-886628	
1366	Lobos, Islas de los	-51.542527	-74.688021		-889497	
1367	Sin Nombre, Islotes	-51.54903	-74.239954		-901729	
1368	Angelotti, Isla	-51.566667	-74.383333		-872279	
1369	Angelott, Islas	-51.574427	-74.375245		-872281	Angelotti, Islas
1370	Dacres, Islas	-51.575201	-73.957931		-879333	
1371	El Cuerno, Roca	-51.587139	-75.348696		-880604	
1372	Cueri Cueri, Islas	-51.611755	-74.550399		-878955	
1373	Krüger, Isla	-51.616567	-72.661919		-885629	
1374	Hupprath, Isla	-51.616667	-71.666667		-884765	Hüpprath, Islote
1375	Lizzie, Isla	-51.6	-74.3		-889215	
1376	Media Luna, Isla	-51.633333	-71.65		-892081	
1377	Torpedera, Islote	-51.633333	-71.633333		-903074	
1378	Diana, Isla	-51.6363	-74.141301		-879629	
1379	Gómez Carreño, Grupo	-51.638475	-74.321056		-883247	
1380	Luis, Isla	-51.64212	-74.332619		-891078	
1381	Alfredo, Isla	-51.643553	-74.349779		-871726	
1382	Morris, Isla	-51.649581	-73.941692		-893017	
1383	Chico, Islote	-51.65	-71.666667		-876847	
1384	Cuanaco, Isla	-51.662356	-72.667158		-883710	Guanaco, Isla
1385	Lagartija, Isla	-51.669927	-72.652103		-886323	
1386	Rata, Islote	-51.676072	-72.643491		-898804	
1387	Solitario, Islote	-51.676731	-74.749547		-901874	
1388	Verdejo, Grupo	-51.683306	-74.689096		-904248	
1389	Wilson, Islas	-51.685238	-74.485041		-904850	
1390	Piazzi, Isla	-51.690906	-74.081179		-896053	
1391	Grado, Isla	-51.705631	-74.609811		-883319	
1392	Sombrero, Isla	-51.705894	-74.743563		-901905	
1393	Titus, Islotes	-51.712234	-73.962343		-902846	
1394	Carrington, Isla	-51.731655	-73.858596		-875495	
1395	Verr, Isla	-51.738486	-74.700269		-904274	
1396	Torres, Isla	-51.748821	-74.566382		-903105	
1397	Vergara, Isla	-51.755168	-72.885104		-904264	
1398	Donoso, Isla	-51.759171	-72.917175		-879869	
1399	Olga, Isla	-51.760748	-74.894079		-894257	
1400	Cisnes, Islotes	-51.761236	-72.522506		-877451	
1401	Gaviotas, Islas	-51.765274	-74.546926		-883121	
1402	Young, Isla	-51.776455	-73.615197		-905037	
1403	Carreño, Isla	-51.79048	-74.519309		-875473	
1404	Ballesteros, Isla	-51.790989	-72.939252		-873060	
1405	Palermo, Isla	-51.800065	-74.092855		-894749	
1406	Flora, Isla	-51.806243	-74.488229		-882707	
1407	Nantuel, Isla	-51.811024	-74.6552		-893304	
1408	Ramírez, Isla	-51.821011	-75.011843	163.2	-898687	
1409	Humberto, Isla	-51.83865	-72.732215		-884744	
1410	Pasaje, Isla	-51.842321	-74.082085		-895269	
1411	Coruña, Grupo	-51.846981	-72.726481		-878690	
1412	Taraba, Isla	-51.851805	-73.881032		-902455	
1413	Flora, Isla	-51.85	-72.916667		-882708	
1414	Proud, Isla	-51.85	-72.9		-897300	
1415	Bertrand, Isla	-51.851925	-72.906358		-873559	
1416	Ismael, Isla	-51.855748	-72.727477		-885168	
1417	Salustio, Isla	-51.864331	-72.883533		-900032	
1418	Abalos, Isla	-51.86539	-72.901581		-872830	Ávalos, Isla
1419	Caribe, Isla	-51.866667	-72.883333		-875340	
1420	Carrera, Isla	-51.866667	-72.9		-875478	
1421	Dirección, Isla	-51.866667	-72.9		-879712	
1422	Labra, Isla	-51.866667	-72.916667		-885758	
1423	O’Reilly, Isla	-51.866667	-72.9		-894335	
1424	Patria, Isla	-51.866667	-72.916667		-895419	
1425	Pinto, Isla	-51.866667	-72.9		-896542	
1426	Holdich, Isla	-51.867448	-72.895408		-884211	
1427	Ceres, Isla	-51.867875	-74.01194		-876119	Geres, Isla
1428	Balmaceda, Grupo	-51.870232	-72.876884		-873067	
1429	Las Lauchas, Islotes	-51.870911	-74.429755		-887998	
1430	Angelotti, Isla	-51.871847	-72.875232		-872280	
1431	Newton, Isla	-51.877871	-73.741409		-893650	
1432	Oyarzún, Isla	-51.881383	-72.871626		-894492	
1433	Chica, Isla	-51.883333	-72.916667		-876813	
1434	Codina, Islote	-51.883333	-72.716667		-877601	
1435	Krug, Isla	-51.883333	-72.9		-885627	
1436	Potrillo, Isla	-51.883333	-72.883333		-897183	
1437	Ruca, Isla	-51.883333	-72.866667		-899761	
1438	Lavaqui, Grupo	-51.884185	-72.868654		-888659	
1439	Kopaitic, Isla	-51.884955	-74.562842		-885621	
1440	Contreras, Isla	-51.886511	-74.873982	626	-878385	
1441	Marazzi, Isla	-51.88904	-72.870578		-891746	
1442	Escape, Isla	-51.889985	-74.491504		-882185	
1443	Focus, Isla	-51.891539	-72.716627		-882740	
1444	Vargas, Isla	-51.892295	-74.39826		-904064	
1445	Huerta, Isla	-51.894843	-72.965257		-884584	Muerta, Isla
1446	Arturo, Isla	-51.895413	-72.950035		-872660	
1447	Silla, Isla	-51.899652	-72.98629		-901660	
1448	Beagle, Isla	-51.909521	-75.129544		-873415	
1449	Morro, Isla	-51.911874	-75.003855		-893024	
1450	Vicente, Isla	-51.912447	-72.998834		-904304	
1451	Briones, Islote	-51.916667	-72.966667		-874078	
1452	Jarpa, Isla	-51.916667	-72.983333		-885281	
1453	Merino, Islote	-51.916667	-72.983333		-892301	
1454	Wilson, Isla	-51.916869	-73.025424		-904849	
1455	Huemul, Isla	-51.918026	-72.713431		-884519	
1456	Cuervos, Isla	-51.9	-72.966667		-878963	
1457	Patos, Islote	-51.9	-72.933333		-895410	
1458	Cóndor, Isla	-51.921064	-72.725847		-878251	
1459	Gómez, Isla	-51.924146	-73.054073		-883242	
1460	Cruz, Isla	-51.928523	-74.374017		-878848	
1461	Toro, Isla	-51.928567	-72.723838		-903031	
1462	La Place, Islas	-51.947744	-73.687947		-887245	
1463	Bermejo, Isla	-51.954607	-74.334133		-873538	
1464	Hunter, Isla	-51.957718	-73.77777		-884762	
1465	Meteoro, Isla	-51.959051	-72.699846		-892343	
1466	Escampavía, Grupo	-51.959306	-72.721304		-882178	Escampavias, Grupo
1467	Tacna, Isla	-51.962327	-75.045404		-902226	
1468	Laguna, Isla	-51.96677	-74.296091		-886477	Lagunas, Isla
1469	Catalina, Isla	-51.967812	-73.681136		-875826	
1470	Diego Portales, Isla	-51.971582	-73.020082		-879673	
1471	Yáñez, Isla	-51.974754	-72.703453		-904919	
1472	Valdivia, Isla	-51.976626	-72.702694		-903935	
1473	Vidal Gormaz, Isla	-51.980722	-74.738324		-904379	
1474	Arica, Isla	-51.982738	-75.039665		-872568	
1475	Diana, Isla	-51.983436	-74.323078		-879630	
1476	Caupolicán, Isla	-51.986097	-74.142609		-875909	
1477	Brinkley, Isla	-51.993305	-73.653989		-874077	
1478	Lautaro, Isla	-52.007845	-74.347769		-888640	
1479	Rennell, Islas	-52.010058	-73.970514	643	-899059	
1480	Alcázar, Isla	-52.016667	-74.366667		-871650	
1481	Maldonado, Isla	-52.016667	-74.583333		-891424	
1482	Esfinge, Isla	-52.019021	-74.228811		-882237	Esfinje, Isla
1483	Anganamon, Isla	-52.034664	-74.382088		-872270	
1484	Almenas, Isla	-52.036097	-74.308989		-871848	
1485	Afortunadas, Islas	-52.036105	-74.106052		-871251	
1486	Pallas, Isla	-52.038863	-74.188483		-904535	Vilumilla, Isla
1487	Alpe, Grupo	-52.047765	-74.276198		-871884	
1488	Ponto, Grupo	-52.05	-74.316667		-896979	
1489	Redondo, Islote	-52.05	-75.083333		-898907	
1490	Zapata, Isla	-52.05	-74.2		-905147	
1491	Ponto, Isla	-52.057146	-74.295682		-896980	
1492	Vergara, Isla	-52.060508	-74.15956		-904265	
1493	Medio Canal, Isla	-52.066667	-73.033333		-892155	
1494	Merino, Isla	-52.066667	-73.016667		-892299	
1495	Norte, Isla	-52.066667	-72.983333		-893822	
1496	Prima, Isla	-52.066667	-74.1		-897259	
1497	Rocallosa, Isla	-52.066667	-74.116667		-899514	
1498	Solitario, Grupo	-52.066667	-74.25		-901872	
1499	Zeta, Islas	-52.066667	-73		-905178	
1500	Bauprés, Isla	-52.068177	-74.233029		-873367	
1501	Meteoro, Isla	-52.072584	-74.269807		-892344	
1502	Margarita, Isla	-52.073948	-73.137486		-891781	
1503	Colocolo, Isla	-52.074547	-74.431265		-877911	
1504	Orompello, Isla	-52.076064	-74.37349		-894392	
1505	Bordes, Isla	-52.076883	-74.342409		-873935	
1506	Pluto, Isla	-52.07707	-74.226121		-896827	
1507	Meteoro, Grupo	-52.078726	-74.251499		-892342	
1508	Verde, Isla	-52.079615	-74.046267		-904222	
1509	Abejorros, Islotes	-52.083333	-74.316667		-871131	
1510	Cordero, Islotes	-52.083333	-73.066667		-878503	Corderos, Islotes
1511	Corral, Isla	-52.083333	-74.2		-878578	
1512	Espinosa, Isla	-52.083333	-73.05		-882358	Espinoza, Isla
1513	Fernández, Isla	-52.083333	-73.133333		-882620	
1514	Rosaura, Islote	-52.083333	-73.483333		-899718	
1515	Rubí, Isla	-52.083333	-74.183333		-899756	
1516	Vial, Islote	-52.083333	-73.116667		-904299	
1517	Silva Renard, Isla	-52.087396	-73.987035		-901682	
1518	Guitarra, Isla	-52.103423	-74.43122		-883938	
1519	Huemul, Isla	-52.116667	-73.933333		-884520	
1520	Tito, Islote	-52.116667	-72.65		-902841	
1521	Barros Arana, Isla	-52.117882	-74.130834		-873294	
1522	Gargona, Isla	-52.11818	-74.77353		-883063	
1523	Julia, Islote	-52.1	-73.116667		-885466	
1524	Quidora, Isla	-52.1	-74.1		-898181	
1525	Chaigneau, Islas	-52.122898	-74.618531		-876367	
1526	Providencia, Isla	-52.124211	-74.467611		-897309	
1527	Centinela, Isla	-52.131591	-74.910508		-876056	
1528	Ville, Islote	-52.133333	-75.033333		-904514	
1529	Christie, Isla	-52.142324	-74.553871		-877242	
1530	Lientur, Isla	-52.142939	-74.433517		-889011	
1531	Huemul, Isla	-52.146286	-74.72933		-884521	
1532	Redondo, Islote	-52.153668	-74.900274		-898908	
1533	Esmeralda, Isla	-52.16412	-74.187773	393	-885433	Juan Guillermos, Isla
1534	Guía, Isla	-52.166667	-73.966667		-883912	
1535	Ballena, Isla	-52.169227	-74.505681		-873038	
1536	Pérez de Arce, Isla	-52.171153	-74.416562		-895907	
1537	Muñoz, Isla	-52.180234	-73.862548		-893162	
1538	Lira, Isla	-52.182046	-74.499452		-886792	
1539	Canopus, Isla	-52.183333	-74.583333		-875107	
1540	Flora, Grupo	-52.183333	-74.016667		-882706	
1541	Orión, Isla	-52.183333	-74.566667		-894375	
1542	Cantuaria, Isla	-52.18487	-74.86808		-875134	
1543	Gonzalo, Islote	-52.196623	-74.883112		-892159	Medusa, Isla
1544	María, Islote	-52.200849	-72.526873		-891793	
1545	Hieron, Isla	-52.206943	-74.784217		-884149	
1546	Sirio, Isla	-52.216214	-74.541371		-901746	
1547	Castor, Isla	-52.221069	-74.576149		-882091	Entrada, Isla
1548	Teniente Manuel González, Isla	-52.235056	-74.260214		-902600	
1549	Pedro Montt, Isla	-52.237067	-73.910853		-895510	
1550	David, Islotes	-52.237182	-73.644519		-879400	
1551	Baverstock, Isla	-52.242778	-73.727876		-873370	
1552	Cutler, Isla	-52.244153	-73.643586		-879303	
1553	Pacheco, Isla	-52.251548	-74.774021	156.8	-894547	
1554	Cornejo, Isla	-52.262758	-74.572383		-878541	
1555	Rosas, Isla	-52.268555	-74.354229		-899715	
1556	Madre, Isla	-52.272176	-74.843959		-891231	
1557	Victoria, Isla	-52.278687	-74.876049		-904337	
1558	Blanca, Isla	-52.281797	-74.454077		-873610	
1559	Low, Islote	-52.283333	-73.716667		-891034	
1560	Solitario, Islote	-52.283333	-73.616667		-901875	
1561	Central, Islote	-52.286953	-73.735426		-876081	
1562	Orlebar, Isla	-52.30831	-73.718992		-894379	
1563	Larga, Isla	-52.308445	-73.624345		-887461	
1564	Cochrane, Isla	-52.313243	-74.141748		-877575	Covadonga, Isla
1565	Silva Varela, Isla	-52.314944	-74.804847		-901684	
1566	Adela, Islote	-52.316667	-73.766667		-871222	
1567	Francis, Islotes	-52.3	-73.716667		-882816	
1568	Notable, Islote	-52.3	-73.716667		-893869	
1569	Djenana, Isla	-52.326064	-74.505184		-879773	
1570	Caiquene, Isla	-52.327293	-74.603135		-874586	Caiquenes, Isla Gaiquenes, Isla
1571	Hoskyn, Isla	-52.328738	-73.694462		-884369	
1572	Summer, Isla	-52.331881	-73.661224		-902092	
1573	Atalaya, Islas	-52.332625	-74.780331		-872751	
1574	Alta, Isla	-52.333333	-74.783333		-871896	
1575	Cheops, Isla	-52.333333	-74.583333		-876770	
1576	Dirección, Islotes	-52.333333	-73.566667		-879724	
1577	Dixon, Isla	-52.333333	-73.7		-879772	
1578	Istmo, Islote	-52.333333	-73.633333		-885174	
1579	Ollard, Islote	-52.333333	-73.683333		-894283	
1580	Redonda, Isla	-52.333333	-74.766667		-898862	
1581	Sierpe, Isla	-52.333333	-73.9		-901617	
1582	Zelada, Isla	-52.333333	-74.75		-905162	
1583	Reina Adelaida, Archipiélago	-52.334549	-74.521654		-898958	
1584	Zeineb, Isla	-52.348024	-74.578441		-905160	
1585	Bradbury, Islote	-52.350791	-73.617457		-874004	
1586	Boca, Grupo de la	-52.35	-74.75		-873801	
1587	Cuarenta Días, Isla	-52.35	-74.766667		-878888	
1588	Pemberton, Islote	-52.35	-73.666667		-895665	
1589	Plato, Isla	-52.35	-74.75		-896769	
1590	Sarita, Islote	-52.35	-73.616667		-901301	
1591	Teta, Islotes	-52.355101	-74.762278		-902657	
1592	King, Isla	-52.360015	-74.635854		-885595	
1593	Cuarenta Días, Grupo	-52.360517	-74.788813		-878887	
1594	Vereker, Islas	-52.360946	-73.716364		-904256	
1595	Avelino, Isla	-52.366667	-73.583333		-872836	
1596	Campbell, Isla	-52.366667	-73.666667		-874935	
1597	Cunningham, Isla	-52.366667	-73.683333		-879149	
1598	Foley, Islotes	-52.366667	-73.7		-882743	
1599	Las Viudas	-52.366667	-73.583333		-888482	
1600	Lucas, Isla	-52.366667	-73.666667		-891053	
1601	Promontorio, Islote	-52.366667	-74.8		-897293	
1602	Valdez, Grupo	-52.366667	-73.6		-903924	
1603	Hartwell, Islas	-52.366991	-73.591254		-884033	
1604	Otter, Islas	-52.369731	-73.663077		-894444	
1605	Andrade, Isla	-52.374141	-74.73741		-872248	
1606	Pollo, Islote	-52.382594	-73.687303		-896919	
1607	Bedwell, Isla	-52.383333	-73.666667		-873435	
1608	Bustos, Grupo	-52.383333	-74.5		-874306	
1609	Cabo, Grupo del	-52.383333	-74.716667		-874395	
1610	Pato, Isla	-52.383333	-73.566667		-895400	
1611	Sullivan, Islas	-52.383333	-73.733333		-902089	
1612	Evangelistas, Islotes	-52.386025	-75.086615		-882479	
1613	Lobos, Islote	-52.387058	-75.089008		-889502	
1614	Elcano, Islote	-52.388934	-75.098694		-880369	
1615	Gato, Isla	-52.391234	-74.530699		-883100	
1616	Dirección, Isla	-52.392582	-74.583663		-879719	
1617	Petromo, Isla	-52.393553	-74.596789		-896000	
1618	Huáscar, Isla	-52.400597	-74.242155		-884438	
1619	Larch, Isla	-52.405424	-73.716004		-887427	
1620	Pan de Azúcar, Isla	-52.408235	-75.067387		-894973	
1621	Connor, Islotes	-52.4	-73.716667		-878325	
1622	Summer, Isla	-52.422198	-74.508601		-902093	
1623	Escobar, Isla	-52.426681	-74.012758		-882197	Escohar, Isla
1624	Theo, Isla	-52.427079	-74.173452		-902679	
1625	Zepeda, Isla	-52.433997	-73.824787		-905174	
1626	Yerbas Buenas, Isla	-52.443033	-73.906634		-905008	
1627	Raby, Isla	-52.446284	-73.980326		-898604	
1628	Sparkes, Islotes	-52.465055	-73.666933		-901965	
1629	Reid, Isla	-52.469889	-73.610361		-898951	
1630	Narborough, Islas	-52.472502	-74.543554		-893323	
1631	Hose, Isla	-52.473599	-73.58811		-884365	
1632	Meta, Isla	-52.478568	-72.886319		-892334	
1633	Shearwater, Islas	-52.492197	-73.578004		-901578	
1634	Cúpula, Islote	-52.516587	-74.611746		-886100	
1635	Freire, Isla	-52.516667	-73.95		-882840	
1636	Isabel, Islote	-52.516667	-73.633333		-885115	
1637	Hull, Islotes	-52.5	-73.666667		-884736	
1638	Richards, Isla	-52.522898	-73.638325		-899162	
1639	Adelaida, Islas	-52.533333	-73.633333		-871228	
1640	Evans, Grupo	-52.533333	-73.683333		-882482	
1641	Simpson, Isla	-52.533724	-73.590307		-901702	
1642	Guillón, Islote	-52.54313	-72.09858		-883926	
1643	Cóndor, Isla	-52.543551	-74.40346		-878252	
1644	Cancino, Isla	-52.55	-73.583333		-875015	
1645	Shoal, Isla	-52.55	-73.65		-901594	
1646	Staveley, Isla	-52.558959	-74.455697		-902000	
1647	Badiola, Isla	-52.564142	-73.565112		-872935	
1648	Isabel, Isla	-52.564465	-72.23831		-885112	
1649	Marta, Isla	-52.565655	-72.289884		-891876	
1650	Manuel Rodríguez, Isla	-52.565949	-73.852882	466	-891656	
1651	Díaz, Isla	-52.566667	-73.6		-879641	
1652	Williams, Isla	-52.566667	-73.716667		-904833	
1653	Juan, Isla	-52.567806	-72.105039		-885412	
1654	Renouard, Isla	-52.567806	-73.665002		-899060	
1655	Hermanas, Isla	-52.570691	-72.694638		-884085	
1656	Garai, Isla	-52.573417	-72.237579		-883038	Garay, Isla
1657	Rucas, Isla	-52.579119	-72.693625		-899783	
1658	Señoret, Archipiélago	-52.582884	-72.652679		-901518	
1659	Lawyers, Islas	-52.592237	-74.357276		-888762	
1660	Latorre, Isla	-52.593466	-74.122379		-888556	
1661	Westminster, Islas	-52.598316	-74.366528		-904782	
1662	Araya, Isla	-52.599701	-72.823607		-872471	
1663	La Viuda, Islote	-52.605275	-72.809343		-888753	
1664	Escarpada, Isla	-52.606745	-72.258098		-882190	
1665	Carnegie, Islotes	-52.616667	-73.733333		-875430	
1666	Larga, Isla	-52.617403	-74.07146		-887463	
1667	Gemelos, Islotes	-52.6	-74.233333		-883141	Jemelos, Islotes
1668	Green, Isla	-52.6	-73.7		-883456	
1669	Green, Islas	-52.6	-73.683333		-883458	
1670	Westminster, Isla	-52.623086	-74.362026		-904781	
1671	Larga, Isla	-52.624328	-72.625998		-887462	
1672	Unicornio, Islas	-52.631553	-72.379839		-903824	
1673	Pun, Grupo	-52.632165	-74.223873		-897619	
1674	Guzmán, Islas	-52.632994	-72.115882		-883966	
1675	Gancho, Isla	-52.653514	-72.087179		-883028	
1676	Viel, Islas	-52.663633	-73.686569		-904406	
1677	Amarilla, Islote	-52.666667	-72.05		-872078	
1678	Tres Picos, Islotes	-52.666667	-73.75		-903449	
1679	Colorado, Islote	-52.669112	-72.310037		-878019	
1680	Dirección, Islote	-52.670948	-72.624865		-879720	
1681	Swett, Isla	-52.671068	-73.671894		-902169	
1682	Parker, Isla	-52.671563	-74.12545		-895230	
1683	Ibáñez, Isla	-52.672015	-73.639562		-884799	
1684	Latorre, Grupo	-52.675057	-72.320883		-888555	
1685	Carreta, Islote	-52.675958	-73.753587		-875482	
1686	Julio, Isla	-52.676587	-73.363752		-885482	
1687	Latorre, Isla	-52.676924	-72.326209		-888557	
1688	Satélites, Islotes	-52.679472	-72.611574		-901320	
1689	Hiudobro, Isla	-52.683333	-73.716667		-884202	
1690	Huneeus, Isla	-52.683333	-73.683333		-884760	
1691	Guarello, Isla	-52.684211	-73.665356		-883835	
1692	Rosas, Isla	-52.696209	-73.695384		-899716	
1693	Lautaro, Isla	-52.699156	-73.454586		-888641	
1694	Larraín, Isla	-52.70238	-73.660291		-887554	
1695	Caldera, Isla	-52.708736	-73.39961		-874671	
1696	Ibáñez del Campo, Isla	-52.710067	-73.695686		-884801	
1697	Lautaro, Islote	-52.716667	-73.783333		165505	
1698	Córdova, Isla	-52.716667	-73.733333		-878517	
1699	Colocolo, Isla	-52.721639	-73.47781		-877912	
1700	Elicura, Isla	-52.727902	-73.508626		-880893	
1701	Torres, Isla	-52.728238	-72.484731		-903106	
1702	Meric, Archipiélago	-52.72999	-72.612675		-892292	
1703	Fairway, Islote	-52.731482	-73.778328		-882522	
1704	Fernández, Grupo	-52.733333	-73.433333		-882619	
1705	Mario, Isla	-52.733333	-73.4		-891837	Marzo, Isla
1706	Moss, Islote	-52.733333	-73.883333		-893071	
1707	Orompello, Isla	-52.733333	-73.566667		-894393	
1708	Oscar, Isla	-52.733333	-73.75		-894410	
1709	Rocky, Islotes	-52.733333	-73.1		-899527	
1710	Zañartu, Isla	-52.738343	-73.351309		-905098	
1711	Fernandez, Isla	-52.74155	-73.402366		165169	
1712	Surgidero, Isla	-52.75009	-72.560397		-902142	
1713	Leucotón, Isla	-52.750913	-73.543267		-888954	
1714	Grande, Isla	-52.75	-72.433333		-883364	
1715	Morales, Islotes	-52.75	-73.4		-892973	
1716	Observación, Islotes	-52.75256	-74.613617		-893957	
1717	Luco, Isla	-52.754816	-73.340685		-891072	
1718	Natalio, Islote	-52.766667	-73.433333		-893339	
1719	Villagrán, Isla	-52.767766	-73.365902		-904481	
1720	Amarilla, Isla	-52.769853	-70.768457		-872077	
1721	Separación, Islotes	-52.772381	-74.587667		-901528	
1722	Violeta, Isla	-52.781214	-73.313634		-904568	
1723	Boston, Isla	-52.78278	-73.774152		-873967	
1724	Devil, Isla	-52.783333	-74.566667		-879578	
1725	Pan de Azucár, Isla	-52.785321	-73.475735		-894971	
1726	Eleodoro, Isla	-52.787056	-73.42486		-880732	
1727	Benítez, Isla	-52.790009	-73.755872		-873516	
1728	Parlamento, Isla	-52.794846	-73.643132		-895233	
1729	Merino, Isla	-52.796455	-73.738046		-892300	
1730	Straggler, Islas	-52.804087	-73.724316		-902046	
1731	Novión, Isla	-52.80453	-73.723258		-893881	
1732	Porvenir, Grupo	-52.805291	-73.658353		-897077	
1733	Carrasco, Grupo	-52.816667	-73.733333		-875468	
1734	Falso Boston, Isla	-52.8	-73.783333		-882538	
1735	Amunategui Group	-52.8	-73.733333		-892526	Minerva, Islas
1736	Berisso, Isla	-52.819922	-73.694748		-873535	
1737	Chandler, Isla	-52.822068	-72.913364		-876553	
1738	García, Isla	-52.829756	-72.518981		-883050	
1739	Gaviota, Grupo	-52.830254	-73.720715		-883118	Goviota, Grupo
1740	Semillero, Grupo	-52.833333	-73.75		-901508	
1741	Beytía, Islotes	-52.842352	-73.563659		-873574	
1742	Nodales, Islotes	-52.842517	-74.433561		-893772	
1743	Marta, Isla	-52.847316	-70.580017		-891877	
1744	Redondo, Islote	-52.861659	-73.714443		-898909	
1745	Isabel, Isla	-52.875072	-70.700036		-885113	
1746	Beaufort, Isla	-52.881859	-73.589903		-882009	Emiliano Figueroa, Isla
1747	Cleto, Islotes	-52.883333	-73.783333		-877504	
1748	Derecha, Grupo	-52.883333	-73.766667		-879470	
1749	Izquierda, Grupo	-52.883333	-73.783333		-885198	
1750	Ugalde, Islote	-52.888891	-73.374671		-903784	
1751	Tamar, Isla	-52.891154	-73.805367		-902346	
1752	Dirección, Islotes	-52.916667	-73.816667		-879725	
1753	Falgate, Islote	-52.916731	-73.829486		-882531	
1754	Carabantes, Isla	-52.9	-73.766667		-875189	
1755	Magdalena, Isla	-52.919421	-70.576273		-891258	
1756	Fricker, Isla	-52.920594	-73.707925		-882866	
1757	Ward, Isla	-52.922882	-73.564362		-904744	
1758	Redonda, Isla	-52.927475	-73.68937		-898863	Round, Isla
1759	Dolphin, Isla	-52.933333	-73.75		-879807	
1760	Mouat, Islas	-52.933333	-73.766667		-893092	
1761	Sentry, Isla	-52.933333	-73.783333		-901526	
1762	Spencer, Islas	-52.933333	-73.766667		-901972	
1763	Contramaestre, Isla	-52.942913	-70.355925		-878377	
1764	Providencia, Isla	-52.952724	-73.542992		-897310	
1765	Black, Isla	-52.960002	-74.608105		-873594	Negro, Islote
1766	Entrada, Isla	-52.967816	-73.467034		-882098	
1767	Patranca, Isla	-52.969258	-74.042921		-895417	
1768	Pasaje, Islas	-52.972508	-73.465075		-895272	
1769	Celery, Isla	-52.983333	-73.566667		-875987	
1770	Vince, Isla	-52.988736	-73.437994		-904548	
1771	Pike, Islas	-52.996186	-73.474765		-896386	
1772	Desolación, Isla	-52.997168	-74.299307	1352	-879556	
1773	Big, Isla	-52.997816	-73.416549		-873577	
1774	Cotesworth, Islas	-53.000478	-74.513785		-878730	
1775	Maze, Islas	-53.006551	-73.494231		-892045	
1776	Díaz, Isla	-53.009508	-73.938186		-879642	
1777	Carranza, Islas	-53.033333	-73.933333		-875460	
1778	Casilda, Islita	-53.033333	-73.95		-875721	
1779	Richardson, Isla	-53.033333	-73.45		-899165	
1780	Richardson, Islas	-53.036128	-73.454041		-899166	
1781	Riesco, Isla	-53.056339	-72.584341	5110	-899178	
1782	Chapman, Islas	-53.062934	-73.741826		-876615	
1783	Entrada, Isla	-53.065607	-72.964671		-882092	
1784	Centinela, Isla	-53.066667	-73.6		-876057	
1785	Marshall, Isla	-53.066667	-73.033333		-891868	
1786	Coughby, Islas	-53.079499	-73.655444		-878738	Coughtry, Islas
1787	Eros, Islotes	-53.081831	-71.959309		-882145	
1788	Altamirano, Grupo	-53.088123	-72.950911		-871925	
1789	Englefield, Isla	-53.090471	-71.850035		-882067	
1790	Negra, Isla	-53.090897	-72.230941		-893389	
1791	Larga, Isla	-53.093863	-72.350952		-887464	
1792	Indio, Isla	-53.100055	-72.232911		-884954	
1793	Hueria Island	-53.103051	-72.256896		-884585	Huerta, Isla
1794	Anderson, Isla	-53.103556	-73.068936		-872241	
1795	Díaz, Isla	-53.105014	-71.823268		-879643	
1796	Adelaida, Islote	-53.1057	-73.59602		-871230	
1797	Campamento, Isla	-53.106525	-73.009745		-874869	
1798	Miguel, Isla	-53.112227	-71.836313		-892400	
1799	Arturo, Grupo	-53.114102	-73.119129		-872657	
1800	Vivian, Isla	-53.117657	-71.84447		-904633	
1801	Soto, Grupo	-53.119007	-73.180938		-901952	Soto, Islas
1802	Lagartija, Isla	-53.119822	-73.292547		-886321	
1803	Esfinge, Isla	-53.122707	-73.028565		-882238	Esfinje, Isla
1804	Vinchuca, Isla	-53.126569	-72.216985		-904550	
1805	Pillolco, Isla	-53.129247	-73.330729		-896435	
1806	Córdova, Isla	-53.134457	-73.505603		-878518	
1807	Santa Ana, Grupo	-53.136594	-73.290681		-900866	
1808	Cabeza, Islote	-53.136796	-72.229315		-874369	
1809	Santa Ana, Isla	-53.143301	-73.271161		-900867	
1810	Grande, Isla	-53.149513	-72.719152		-883365	
1811	Blaxland, Isla	-53.15036	-73.324314		-873785	
1812	Camotaro, Isla	-53.154524	-73.229833		-874856	
1813	Graves, Isla	-53.15645	-74.338966		-883442	
1814	Beauclerk, Islas	-53.160837	-73.95763		-873422	
1815	Andalicán, Isla	-53.161664	-73.248383		-872235	
1816	Lúnes, Isla del	-53.166667	-74.266667		-892805	Monday, Isla
1817	Tuesday, Isla	-53.166667	-74.3		-903653	
1818	Friday, Grupo	-53.169143	-74.136965		-882867	
1819	Week, Islas	-53.173145	-74.299442		-904763	
1820	Thursday, Isla	-53.17877	-74.186724		-902693	
1821	Gidley, Isla	-53.185118	-72.202214		-883182	Guidley, Isla
1822	Saturday, Isla	-53.187243	-74.328955		-901323	
1823	Diegues, Isla	-53	-73.933333		-879675	
1824	Santa Cruz, Isla	-53.207652	-72.47387		-900923	
1825	Miguel Díaz, Isla	-53.212389	-72.44391		-892404	
1826	Entry, Isla	-53.216667	-73.333333		-882115	
1827	Pasaje, Isla	-53.216667	-73.366667		-895270	
1828	Bennet, Isla	-53.218452	-72.313268		-873524	
1829	Corona, Islas	-53.244434	-72.367943		-878549	
1830	Corona, Isla	-53.244775	-72.36753		-878548	
1831	Ward, Isla	-53.251147	-72.393553		-904745	
1832	Roa, Isla	-53.251775	-72.149214		-899470	
1833	Grave, Isla	-53.25	-73.333333		-883439	
1834	Stokes, Isla	-53.25	-72.133333		-902031	
1835	Pritchard, Islotes	-53.252929	-73.300206		-897278	
1836	Pan de Azúcar, Isla	-53.260817	-72.360907		-894972	
1837	Wellard, Isla	-53.26175	-73.307343		-904767	
1838	Molina, Isla	-53.269981	-72.112436		-892699	
1839	Sara, Isla	-53.296757	-73.739931		-901279	
1840	Medio, Islotes	-53.297915	-72.456109		-892125	
1841	Tree, Islotes	-53.299014	-72.407457		-903350	
1842	Inman, Isla	-53.305136	-74.278237		-885038	
1843	Becerra, Isla	-53.316667	-72.666667		-873429	
1844	Orrego, Isla	-53.316667	-71.783333		-894396	
1845	Shelter, Isla	-53.317648	-73.038181		-901582	
1846	Aterraje, Isla del	-53.3	-74.166667		-898844	Landfall, Isla Lanfall, Isla Recalada, Isla
1847	Elena, Isla	-53.320956	-73.176094		-880707	Ellen, Islote
1848	Guzmán, Isla	-53.321795	-72.502947		-883965	
1849	Dagnino, Isla	-53.352945	-72.64771		-879346	
1850	Childs, Isla	-53.355705	-73.836283		-876920	
1851	Green, Isla	-53.364534	-72.42992		-883457	Greene, Isla
1852	Rock, Isla	-53.365426	-72.892497		-899522	
1853	Gazitúa, Islote	-53.366667	-72.45		-883127	
1854	Riquelme, Isla	-53.368306	-72.100326		-899417	
1855	Abra, Isla	-53.368742	-73.066201		-871140	
1856	Cutter, Isla	-53.370782	-72.471026		-879307	
1857	Henley, Isla	-53.377903	-73.179595		-884071	
1858	Green, Islote	-53.384504	-74.069672		-883460	
1859	Roberts, Isla	-53.38606	-73.546039		-899482	
1860	Francis, Isla	-53.390882	-73.179677		-882815	
1861	Redwood, Isla	-53.395431	-73.749299		-898912	
1862	Chope, Isla	-53.402395	-72.851909		-877177	
1863	Kinght, Islote	-53.403344	-73.216689		-885610	Knight, Islote
1864	Fondeadero, Isla	-53.410011	-72.102945		-882748	
1865	Alacrán, Isla	-53.417266	-72.589823		-871585	
1866	Maycock, Isla	-53.4	-73.25		-892021	
1867	Estrella, Isla	-53.4	-72.983333		-902011	Stella, Islita
1868	Evans, Isla	-53.419101	-73.856301		-882484	
1869	Skinner, Islotes	-53.433333	-72.816667		-901756	
1870	Terán, Islotes	-53.433333	-72.466667		-902620	
1871	Larga, Isla	-53.438027	-73.236221		-887465	Long, Isla
1872	Nahuel, Isla	-53.470512	-71.7847		-893240	
1873	Arthur, Isla	-53.487382	-72.903959		-872661	Arturo, Isla
1874	Wallis, Islas	-53.495467	-72.743629		-904738	
1875	Carteret, Isla	-53.496559	-72.761911		-875583	
1876	Osorno, Islotes	-53.503737	-72.6241		-894426	
1877	Doñas, Isla	-53.504707	-71.832408		-879841	
1878	Rice Trevor, Islas	-53.510607	-73.460419		-899160	
1879	Erizos, Islotes	-53.5	-72.416667		-882139	
1880	Spider, Isla	-53.522092	-72.677842		-901975	
1881	Ortiz, Islas	-53.533333	-72.483333		-894403	
1882	Borja, Isla	-53.540018	-72.497284		-873947	Borja Grande, Isla
1883	Núñes, Isla	-53.541259	-73.760277		-893924	Núñez, Isla Nunos, Isla
1884	Cohorn, Islote	-53.551671	-72.337488		-877626	
1885	Beware, Islote	-53.55	-72.566667		-873573	
1886	Borja Chica, Isla	-53.55	-72.5		-873946	
1887	El Morrion	-53.583333	-72.45		-893015	Morrión, Mogote del
1888	Bonet, Isla	-53.584096	-72.344795		-880283	El Bonete, Isla
1889	Adams, Islote	-53.613481	-72.291902		-871218	
1890	Carlos III, Isla	-53.618087	-72.353308		-875373	
1891	Rupert, Isla	-53.660447	-72.212629		-899838	
1892	Fincham, Islas	-53.690942	-73.701852		-882663	
1893	Monmouth, Isla	-53.700243	-72.191597		-892816	
1894	James, Isla	-53.700507	-72.209896		-885227	
1895	Wigwam, Isla	-53.7	-71.983333		-904817	
1896	Mussel, Isla	-53.733333	-71.916667		-893199	
1897	Carlos, Islas	-53.73628	-72.127392		-876653	Charles, Islas
1898	Wood, Isla	-53.759512	-72.057344		-904870	
1899	Santa Inés, Isla	-53.760425	-72.672123	3688	-900998	
1900	Llallos, Islotes	-53.766667	-72.033333		34483	
1901	Wren, Isla	-53.773165	-72.083771		-904877	
1902	Córdoba i Ramos, Isla de	-53.831758	-71.06619		-893335	Nassau, Isla
1903	Offing, Isla	-53.833179	-70.386814		-894016	
1904	Tesner, Islote	-53.833333	-70.4		-902652	
1905	Theo, Isla	-53.848644	-71.900208		-902680	
1906	León, Punta	-53.85	-72.183333		34642	
1907	Wet, Isla	-53.857767	-72.206841		-904784	
1908	Castellano, Isla	-53.860884	-72.02813		-875749	
1909	Alcayaga, Isla	-53.866607	-72.269488		-871649	
1910	Hernan, Isla	-53.866667	-72		35060	
1911	Guillermo, Isla	-53.866667	-72		35061	
1912	Cayetano, Isla	-53.869657	-72.117145		-875948	
1913	Lambert, Isla	-53.870623	-71.425499		-886876	
1914	Norte, Isla	-53.883333	-70.933333		-893823	
1915	Hill, Islas	-53.889118	-72.326841		-884188	Hills, Islas
1916	Simón, Isla	-53.890943	-72.036498		-901695	
1917	San Juan, Isla	-53.897317	-70.902296		-900511	
1918	Acosta, Isla	-53.916995	-72.176022		35056	
1919	Rocosos, Islotes	-53.9	-70.916667		-899532	Rocky, Islotes
1920	Burgess, Isla	-53.923636	-72.07667		-874271	
1921	Dawson, Isla	-53.950311	-70.60909	1290	-879405	
1922	Dos Hermanos, Islotes	-53.95638	-71.406994		-879910	
1923	Browell, Isla	-53.983302	-72.313864		-874100	
1924	Rasputín, Islotes	-53.983333	-72.333333		-898800	
1925	Huwine, Isla	-53.984271	-70.629949		-884779	
1926	Bedford, Isla	-53.986064	-72.362373		-873434	
1927	Jorge, Isla	-54.012847	-72.332927		-885354	
1928	López, Islotes	-54.03012	-72.329677		-889766	
1929	Clarence, Isla	-54.046236	-71.956693	1111	-877469	
1930	Periagua, Isla	-54.048549	-71.064399		-895915	
1931	Entrada, Isla	-54.049688	-72.33438		-882093	
1932	Carisauke, Isla	-54.050903	-70.513395		-901829	Soki, Isla
1933	Dirreción, Islotes	-54.05	-72.366667		35098	
1934	Peak, Isla	-54.05436	-71.132355		-895453	
1935	Bivouac, Isla	-54.058786	-71.679225		-873592	Biyouac, Isla
1936	Arrison, Isla	-54.064897	-71.222423		-884028	Harrison, Isla
1937	Carlos, Isla	-54.075804	-73.320724		-875366	Charles, Isla Grafton Island
1938	Medio, Islotes del	-54.07722	-72.500664		-892126	
1939	Carukinca, Isla	-54.081098	-70.070762		-875584	
1940	Lagos, Isla	-54.087338	-72.482736		-886373	
1941	Tierra del Fuego, Archipelago	-54	-70		-1016891	
1942	Tierra del Fuego, Isla Grande de	-54	-69	47,992	-1016893	
1943	Wickham, Isla	-54.113193	-70.379212		-904810	
1944	William, Islas	-54.116637	-72.985665		-904824	
1945	Anxious, Islotes	-54.116667	-70.916667		-872397	
1946	Grafton, Islas	-54.1	-73.2		-883320	
1947	Comandante, Isla	-54.119615	-72.181616		-878107	
1948	Elisabeth, Isla	-54.121763	-73.178369		-880919	Elizabeth, Isla
1949	Ayudante, Isla	-54.122608	-72.203174		-872865	
1950	Capitán Aracena, Isla	-54.125346	-71.421466	1164	-875166	
1951	James, Isla	-54.126992	-73.131605		-885228	
1952	Nena, Isla	-54.127473	-72.682789		-893606	
1953	Corneta, Islote	-54.13007	-72.193049		-878543	
1954	Guardiamarina Zañartu, Isla	-54.131808	-72.628456		-883830	
1955	Herrera, Isla	-54.134314	-72.493261		-884123	
1956	Vitita, Isla	-54.139813	-72.761275		-904622	
1957	Rees, Islotes	-54.15	-70.966667		35107	
1958	Rees, Isla	-54.152015	-70.985197		-898915	
1959	Pléyades, Islas	-54.159571	-72.70747		-896800	
1960	Rodríguez, Isla	-54.161604	-72.504604		-899561	
1961	John, Islas	-54.166093	-73.077567		-885333	
1962	Santa Cruz, Isla	-54.166667	-70.283333		-900924	
1963	Guardián Brito, Isla	-54.16725	-72.361857		-883832	
1964	Ipswich, Islas	-54.170629	-73.315465		-885075	Ipswick, Islas
1965	Trece, Grupo de los	-54.172529	-72.198655		-903348	
1966	Tuckers, Islas	-54.176745	-70.280588		-903640	
1967	Libertad, Isla	-54.178346	-73.024637		-888977	
1968	Fuente, Isla de la	-54.183333	-70.233333		-882909	
1969	Ewing, Islas	-54.188629	-72.543198		-882488	
1970	Laberinto, Islas	-54.190686	-72.114694		-885726	
1971	Hidrográficos, Islotes	-54.200956	-72.173385		-884145	
1972	Isabella, Isla	-54.211334	-72.960478		-885119	
1973	Jumbo, Islote	-54.2	-70.9		34453	
1974	Mía, Islote	-54.2	-70.883333		34455	
1975	Vértigo, Islotes	-54.224857	-72.100038		-904283	
1976	Julio, Isla	-54.227254	-72.045747		-885483	
1977	Otazo, Isla	-54.229873	-72.166555		-894438	
1978	Mogotes, Islotes	-54.238024	-72.123603		-892681	
1979	Staines, Islas	-54.251044	-72.197848		-901989	
1980	Larga, Isla	-54.25	-72.266667		35154	
1981	Alegría, Isla	-54.25	-71.666667		-871691	
1982	Lort, Isla	-54.253088	-72.655641		-889802	
1983	Entrada, Islotes	-54.258942	-70.957478		-882101	
1984	Molly, Isla	-54.261065	-71.63659		-892775	
1985	Stanley, Isla	-54.262192	-72.031041		-901993	
1986	Sanchez, Islote	-54.266667	-70.816667		34460	
1987	Guezalaga, Isla	-54.266667	-72.5		-883906	
1988	Dora, Islas	-54.270545	-72.509879		-879883	
1989	Dora, Isla	-54.272094	-72.372504		-879882	
1990	Alta, Isla	-54.281286	-69.937244		-871897	High, Isla
1991	Barrow, Isla	-54.283333	-71.45		-879664	Diego, Isla
1992	Bajo, Islote	-54.286785	-69.667044		-872996	Low, Isla
1993	Santibáñez, Isla	-54.296179	-72.07908		-901211	
1994	Bayne, Isla	-54.298502	-71.594335		-873378	Baynes, Isla
1995	Duntze, Islas	-54.299158	-71.795512		-879985	
1996	Cenaria, Islote	-54.299523	-70.939741		-875998	Cien Brazas, Islote Lenaria, Isla
1997	Seebrock, Isla	-54.301127	-71.701472		-901493	
1998	Bare, Isla	-54.302158	-69.653423		-879554	Desnudo, Islote
1999	Agnes, Islas	-54.30304	-72.732593		-871262	Inés, Islas
2000	Corkhill, Isla	-54.304612	-69.639379		-878531	
2001	Javiera, Isla	-54.306687	-71.41323		-885298	
2002	Zelada, Islas	-54.308426	-72.235585		-905163	
2003	Mortimer, Isla	-54.309085	-72.300249		-893055	
2004	Laberinto, Isla	-54.309783	-70.983508		-885727	
2005	Chulula, Islote	-54.316667	-71.316667		-877313	
2006	Libra, Grupo	-54.316667	-69.616667		-888983	
2007	Macey, Islote	-54.317222	-69.584829		-891173	Massey, Isla
2008	Bynde, Isla	-54.318084	-72.184971		-874326	Bynoe, Isla
2009	Cove, Isla	-54.31824	-71.623881		-880914	Elisa, Isla
2010	Contramaestre, Islotes	-54.327431	-72.030334		-878378	
2011	Lira Mella, Islotes	-54.333333	-70.5		35115	
2012	Jane, Isla	-54.333333	-70.983333		-885235	
2013	Ballena, Isla	-54.34193	-72.127357		-873039	
2014	Fitz Roy, Isla	-54.362042	-71.332911		-882675	
2015	Kempe, Isla	-54.365587	-72.46405		-885576	
2016	Dubos, Islote	-54.366667	-72.233333		35160	
2017	Magill, Islas	-54.366667	-72.333333		-891266	
2018	Horacio, Islote	-54.368975	-71.602085		-884294	
2019	Enderby, Isla	-54.369634	-71.970658		-882054	Enderly, Isla
2020	Amaya, Isla	-54.369728	-71.439127		-872118	
2021	Adelaida, Isla	-54.370707	-72.109275		-871227	
2022	Baja, Isla	-54.371087	-71.418559		-872966	
2023	Kirke, Islas	-54.375199	-71.743397		-885604	
2024	Prowse, Isla	-54.377929	-71.570375		-897315	
2025	King, Isla	-54.378054	-71.282198		-885596	
2026	Reyes, Isla	-54.382501	-71.509811		-899141	
2027	Enderby, Islas	-54.383333	-71.95		35119	
2028	Vidal Gormáz, Isla	-54.388261	-71.936214		-904380	
2029	Skyring, Isla	-54.391281	-72.169278		-901759	
2030	Petit, Islote	-54.396162	-71.688997		-895984	
2031	Chasco, Isla	-54.419396	-72.017434		-877495	Clavel, Islas
2032	Furia, Isla	-54.421288	-72.317909		-882926	Fury, Isla
2033	Enrique, Isla	-54.42886	-72.093267		-884075	Henry, Isla
2034	Tres Mogotes, Islote	-54.440557	-69.076168		-903427	
2035	Brisbane, Isla	-54.468325	-72.268451		-874081	
2036	Noir, Isla	-54.472966	-73.013797		-893783	
2037	Meteoro, Isla	-54.474822	-72.01055		-892345	
2038	Dos Hermanas, Islas	-54.487515	-69.19739		-879904	
2039	Guía, Isla	-54.498428	-72.021125		-883913	
2040	Barcaza, Islote	-54.533333	-72.383333		34411	
2041	Lagartija, Isla	-54.539899	-72.005008		-886322	
2042	Redonda, Isla	-54.545443	-71.999222		-898864	
2043	Aguirre, Isla	-54.559353	-72.020927		-871527	
2044	Pájaros, Islotes	-54.570775	-71.954427		-894680	
2045	Tower, Isla	-54.575	-72.75		38189	
2046	Astrea, Isla	-54.597052	-72.07144		-872728	
2047	Torres, Islotes	-54.616667	-73.066667		34624	
2048	London, Isla	-54.647896	-71.987049		-889705	
2049	Nelson, Islas	-54.653977	-71.870899		-893602	
2050	Jorge, Grupo	-54.664667	-71.451932		-885351	
2051	Marchant, Isla	-54.666326	-71.36801		-891757	
2052	Camden, Islas	-54.666667	-71.966667		-874838	
2053	Georgiana, Isla	-54.667627	-71.730995		-883168	Georgina, Isla Jorjina, Isla
2054	Brecknock, Isla	-54.674153	-71.559961		-874054	
2055	Gorda, Isla	-54.682199	-71.433395		-883284	
2056	Andres, Isla	-54.683333	-71.816667		35215	
2057	Sandwich, Islas	-54.683969	-71.407787		-900244	
2058	Capea, Islotes	-54.696242	-71.874039		-875150	Oapea, Islotes
2059	Mery, Islotes	-54.702014	-71.564537		-892310	
2060	Macías, Isla	-54.703076	-71.526189		-891200	
2061	Marsh, Isla	-54.70465	-71.469363		-891867	
2062	Clementina, Isla	-54.7	-71.75		35228	
2063	Víctor, Islotes	-54.716667	-71.7		35230	
2064	Dirección, Isla	-54.716911	-71.36928		-879714	
2065	Hyde, Isla	-54.718545	-71.08891		-884789	
2066	Entrada, Islote	-54.7	-71.45		-882099	
2067	Tolondrón, Isla	-54.719878	-71.06519		-902922	
2068	Burnt, Isla	-54.722655	-71.242789		-874279	
2069	Basket, Isla	-54.726825	-71.589844		-873334	
2070	Laberinto Occidental, Islotes	-54.727134	-71.483996		-885729	Laberinto Oeste
2071	Smoke, Isla	-54.727232	-71.142337		-901773	
2072	Lautaro, Islotes	-54.733333	-71.683333		35231	
2073	Tucho, Islote	-54.733333	-71.15		37660	
2074	Guala, Isla	-54.735725	-71.377011		-883636	Guale, Isla Gualo, Isla
2075	Fresia, Isla	-54.736885	-71.393033		-882853	
2076	Sidney, Isla	-54.7395	-71.823348		-901614	
2077	Yagán, Isla	-54.742449	-71.164431		-904891	
2078	Leadline, Islas	-54.746949	-71.032901		-888787	
2079	Laberinto Central, Islotes	-54.749226	-71.446559		-885728	
2080	Meridión, Islotes	-54.75	-71.3		35249	
2081	Morritos, Isla	-54.753759	-71.377285		-893020	
2082	Bruce, Isla	-54.754426	-71.272996		-874112	
2083	Chinchorro, Grupo	-54.764427	-71.311279		-877020	Chinchorros, Islotes
2084	Katy, Isla	-54.790036	-71.360476		-885563	
2085	Peñón, Islote	-54.793181	-71.543139		-895784	
2086	Vargas, Islotes	-54.800994	-71.252002		-904065	
2087	Catalina, Isla	-54.809783	-71.216325		-875827	
2088	Dos Hermanos, Islotes	-54.816667	-71.433333		-879911	
2089	Huacho, Islote	-54.818121	-71.604111		-884395	
2090	Tetón, Islotes	-54.820436	-71.515755		-902671	
2091	Cabo, Islote	-54.822937	-71.449801		-874396	
2092	Grande, Isla	-54.833333	-70.916667		-883366	
2093	Medio, Islas del	-54.833333	-70.916667		-892116	
2094	Chico, Islote	-54.836651	-70.828845		-876848	
2095	Señal, Isla	-54.844571	-70.930003		-901509	
2096	Entrada, Islote	-54.866667	-70.75		37623	
2097	Montenares, Islote	-54.866667	-70.083333		37730	
2098	Stewart, Isla	-54.871931	-71.167678		-902019	
2099	González, Islote	-54.873881	-68.762973		-883265	
2100	Golondrina, Isla	-54.87958	-70.369358		-883228	
2101	O’Brien, Isla	-54.880213	-70.557783	136.3	-893949	
2102	Bartlett, Islote	-54.883333	-68.233333		-873319	
2103	Guardia, Isla	-54.883333	-71.216667		-883827	
2104	Militar, Isla	-54.883333	-71.233333		-892421	
2105	Cóndor, Islote	-54.885417	-70.298989		-878253	
2106	Timbales, Grupo	-54.88749	-70.312116		-902779	
2107	Término, Islote	-54.88848	-70.292376		-902639	
2108	Chair, Isla	-54.890943	-70.045932		-876383	
2109	Curioso, Islote	-54.891642	-67.976588		-879265	
2110	Timbal Grande, Isla	-54.897227	-70.277061		-902781	
2111	Cole, Isla	-54.89933	-68.178392		-877767	
2112	Baja, Isla	-54.901075	-70.302231		-872967	
2113	Timbal Chico, Isla	-54.901967	-70.244293		-902778	
2114	Lawrence, Isla	-54.904708	-68.237125		-888759	
2115	Ema, Isla	-54.907065	-68.288564		-882000	
2116	Shelter, Isla	-54.907356	-71.435222		-901583	
2117	Hermanas, Islotes	-54.908751	-68.313188		-884087	
2118	Norte, Isla	-54.90985	-68.33513		-893824	
2119	Panqueque, Islote	-54.9	-67.983333		169660	
2120	Chicle, Isla	-54.91243	-68.34912		-876834	
2121	Whaits, Islas	-54.913927	-68.353357		-904787	
2122	Sur, Isla	-54.913995	-68.338791		-902114	
2123	Timbales, Islas	-54.914001	-70.27639		-902780	
2124	Martínez, Isla	-54.914947	-68.280587		-891888	
2125	Abarca, Isla	-54.916667	-68.266667		-871127	
2126	Baja, Isla	-54.916667	-68.4		-872968	
2127	Chela, Isla	-54.916667	-68.35		-876744	
2128	Conejera, Isla	-54.916667	-68.316667		-878287	
2129	Dirección, Islote	-54.916667	-68.333333		-879721	
2130	Entrada, Isla	-54.916667	-68.333333		-882094	
2131	Eugenia, Islotes	-54.916667	-67.283333		-882459	
2132	Negro, Islote	-54.916667	-68.383333		-893538	
2133	Paty, Isla	-54.916667	-68.266667		-895425	
2134	Picapedreros, Islas	-54.916667	-68.366667		-896072	
2135	Proyectada, Isla	-54.916667	-68.316667		-897316	
2136	Rodríguez, Islotes	-54.916667	-68.35		-899563	
2137	Tito, Isla	-54.916667	-68.266667		-902840	
2138	Vásquez, Isla	-54.916667	-68.233333		-904089	
2139	Santibáñez, Isla	-54.917335	-68.366555		-901212	
2140	García, Islotes	-54.9	-68.266667		-883051	
2141	Husha, Isla	-54.9	-68.383333		-884777	
2142	Ramón, Isla	-54.9	-71.283333		-898694	
2143	Redonda, Isla	-54.919014	-70.627524		-898866	
2144	Figueroa, Isla	-54.919858	-68.322743		-882644	
2145	Tongo, Isla	-54.921598	-68.369517		-902952	
2146	Larga, Isla	-54.922119	-68.339633		169620	
2147	Barlovento, Isla	-54.922974	-67.311568		-873194	
2148	Celina, Isla	-54.924234	-71.445457		-875990	Selina, Isla
2149	Delia, Isla	-54.924246	-67.329931		-879440	
2150	Neumann, Islotes	-54.925	-68.5		169587	
2151	Gil, Isla	-54.925418	-68.300448		-883185	
2152	Campamento, Islas	-54.930735	-68.460846		-874870	
2153	Darwin, Isla	-54.930932	-70.143323		-879391	
2154	Central, Islotes	-54.933333	-71.266667		37699	
2155	Central, Grupo	-54.933333	-71.25		-876079	
2156	Mayor, Isla	-54.933333	-71.016667		-892036	
2157	Guillermo, Isla	-54.940706	-70.586464		-883922	
2158	Mensajero, Isla	-54.95	-71.033333		35272	
2159	Ayudante, Isla	-54.95	-70.983333		-872866	
2160	Snipe, Isla	-54.953946	-67.146816		-901779	
2161	Diablo, Isla del	-54.958757	-69.119891		-879599	
2162	Cook, Isla	-54.963742	-70.348258		-878400	London, Isla
2163	Gordon, Isla	-54.966667	-69.583333	591	-883298	
2164	Guardián, Isla	-54.966667	-71.016667		-883831	
2165	Mensajero, Grupo	-54.966667	-71.033333		-892261	
2166	Solitario, Islote	-54.970804	-67.13069		-901876	
2167	Thompson, Isla	-54.974294	-70.074148		-902684	Thomson, Isla
2168	Hermanos, Islotes	-54.978529	-67.080358		-884089	
2169	Gilbert, Islas	-54.979284	-71.178129		-883186	
2170	Verde, Islote	-54.983333	-69.983333		37748	
2171	Dimanche, Isla	-55.004649	-68.255675		-879694	Dimonche, Isla
2172	Bolton, Isla	-55.005873	-70.292476		-885574	Kelvin, Isla
2173	Jorge, Islote	-55.007914	-67.070722		-885358	
2174	Garden, Isla	-55.010358	-66.928431		-883060	Gardiner, Isla
2175	Strate, Isla	-55.011239	-68.297404		-902047	
2176	Animita, Islote	-55.016667	-69.516667		37765	
2177	Button, Isla	-55.024721	-68.245656		-874321	
2178	Picton, Isla	-55.033333	-66.95	105.4	-896223	
2179	Promontorio, Isla	-55.034551	-70.151288		-897292	
2180	Luisa, Isla	-55.036723	-70.418376		-891087	
2181	Dos Cumbres, Isla	-55.039108	-70.206106		-879900	
2182	Delta, Isla	-55.040922	-69.964189		-879450	
2183	Conejos, Isla	-55.044432	-68.158406		-878290	
2184	Pauvre, Isla	-55.045243	-68.298897		-895439	
2185	Londonderry, Isla	-55.046693	-70.780785	643	-889706	
2186	Reparo, Isla	-55.047733	-66.808807		-899061	
2187	Coihue, Isla	-55.048873	-68.161035		-877643	
2188	Hat, Isla	-55.052306	-71.123685		-884038	
2189	Olga, Isla	-55.057955	-70.059418		-894258	
2190	Blanca, Isla	-55.066667	-66.533333		-873611	
2191	Ildefonso, Islas	-55.066667	-69.433333	0.2	-884851	
2192	Londonderry, Islas	-55.070423	-70.671676	643	-889707	
2193	Grande, Isla	-55.075034	-69.906192		-883367	
2194	Navarino, Isla	-55.075531	-67.655396		-893346	
2195	Lobos, Islote	-55.079426	-68.207769		-889503	
2196	Packsaddle, Islote	-55.080446	-66.929426		-894565	
2197	Los Gansos, Islotes	-55.081832	-67.049828		-890220	
2198	Redonda, Isla	-55.086387	-70.182554		-898867	Redondo, Islote
2199	Centinela, Islote	-55.087297	-69.999214		-876058	
2200	Treble, Isla	-55.093327	-71.033913		-903337	
2201	Troude, Isla	-55.101866	-68.184689		-903591	
2202	Alijulip, Islas	-55.116667	-70.883333		-871810	Alikhoolip, Islas
2203	Jorge, Isla	-55.116667	-70.783333		-885355	
2204	Pacha, Isla	-55.129425	-68.300959		-894533	
2205	Mascart, Isla	-55.133787	-68.446938		-891906	
2206	Mendigos, Islas	-55	-71.033333		37674	
2207	Quezada, Isla	-55.15	-68.366667		36705	
2208	Única, Isla	-55.15	-68.533333		36706	
2209	Niño, Islote	-55.15	-70.133333		37778	
2210	Grande, Isla	-55.165014	-68.741418		-883368	
2211	Hoste, Isla	-55.172687	-68.99953	4117	-884382	
2212	Phillips, Isla	-55.178738	-70.656683		-896049	
2213	Exterior, Islote	-55.183333	-70.333333		37694	
2214	Señal, Islote	-55.18595	-66.45496		-901510	
2215	Larga, Isla	-55	-70.033333		-887466	
2216	Milna Edwards, Isla	-55.189004	-68.259381		-892464	Milne Edwards, Isla
2217	Chico, Islote	-55.191645	-66.42993		-876849	
2218	Sidney, Isla	-55.2	-69.95		37777	
2219	Mariotti, Islotes	-55.214336	-67.094554		36994	
2220	Terán, Islote	-55.216667	-66.966667		37001	
2221	Lobos, Islote	-55.216667	-67.45		-889504	
2222	Nueva, Isla	-55.218729	-66.541569	120	-893896	
2223	Dingy, Islote	-55.2	-67.083333		-879703	
2224	Bertrand, Isla	-55.227622	-67.936995		-873560	
2225	Canacus, Isla	-55.228785	-68.229046		-874951	Green, Isla Greene, Isla
2226	Raquel, Isla	-55.233333	-66.833333		-898778	
2227	Whittlebury, Isla	-55.236434	-70.077807		-904806	
2228	Sea, Isla	-55.268174	-70.567358		-901399	
2229	Scott, Isla	-55.272561	-67.827735		-901388	
2230	Augusto, Isla	-55.276148	-66.685421		-872802	Augustus, Isla
2231	Nachbaur, Islas	-55.281607	-69.129149		-893214	
2232	Regnault, Isla	-55.282089	-69.288862		-898944	
2233	Medio, Isla	-55.283333	-67.066667		-892124	
2234	Hamond, Isla	-55.28375	-70.116872		-884001	
2235	Lennox, Isla	-55.285025	-66.93565	170.4	-888860	
2236	Ormeña, Islote	-55.291863	-66.82439		-894381	Ormeño, Isla
2237	Masson, Isla	-55.292027	-69.039731		-891911	
2238	Hervé Mangón, Isla	-55.300949	-68.906346		-884129	
2239	Ferrier, Isla	-55.302312	-69.206055		-895936	Perrier, Isla
2240	Luff, Isla	-55.313801	-66.791936		-891076	
2241	Ripita, Islotes	-55.316667	-70.183333		37782	
2242	Burnt, Islas	-55.31749	-69.857013		-874281	
2243	Paques, Isla	-55.325188	-69.24218		-895146	
2244	Vauverlandt, Isla	-55.327026	-67.986588		-904092	
2245	Nagel, Isla	-55.328198	-68.331364		-893227	
2246	Iñaque, Isla	-55.33185	-66.859142		-884898	
2247	Jackson, Islote	-55.333333	-68.35		-885209	
2248	Mafuil, Islotes	-55.343233	-66.853848		-891241	
2249	Mouchez, Isla	-55.344409	-69.159053		-893093	
2250	Waterman, Isla	-55.345151	-70.013876		-904756	
2251	Shag, Isla	-55.363123	-69.916446		-901571	
2252	Pringle, Islas	-55.365434	-68.226102		-897276	
2253	Christmas, Islas	-55.365879	-70.063695		-877246	
2254	Goose, Isla	-55.370187	-69.831437		-883279	
2255	Asmussen, Islote	-55.385061	-68.217134		-872694	
2256	Packsaddl, Isla	-55.400038	-68.080151		-894564	Packsaddle, Isla
2257	Dumont d’Urbille, Isla	-55.408065	-69.088777		-879977	Dumont d’Urville, Isla
2258	Wood, Islas	-55.4	-69.666667		-904871	
2259	Guffern, Islas	-55.438862	-68.056964		-883907	
2260	Tomás, Isla	-55.442631	-69.706199		-902935	Thomas, Isla
2261	Terhalten, Isla	-55.445965	-67.057288		-902634	
2262	Luisa, Islotes	-55.460551	-67.997096		-891088	
2263	Sesambre, Isla	-55.46102	-67.030734		-901564	
2264	Carolina, Isla	-55.464456	-69.52001		-875443	Caroline, Isla
2265	Arthur, Isla	-55.474479	-69.767974		-872642	Arturo, Isla
2266	Emilia, Isla	-55.480087	-69.584607		-882012	Emilio, Isla Emily, Isla
2267	Dédalo, Isla	-55.481466	-67.632911		-879788	Doedalus, Isla Doedalus, Islotes
2268	Pouchet, Islas	-55.489912	-68.523515		-897189	
2269	Pothuáu, Isla	-55.496616	-68.622493		-897100	
2270	Peyrón, Isla	-55.505272	-68.892657		-896045	
2271	Goose, Isla	-55.511944	-68.030514		-883280	
2272	Burnt, Isla	-55.517655	-68.036152		-874280	
2273	Penguin Island	-55.529635	-68.058502		-901581	Sheep, Isla
2274	Thiery, Isla	-55.529782	-68.419679		-902681	
2275	Hope, Isla	-55.533221	-69.625094		-884284	
2276	Golddust, Isla	-55.534424	-69.079678		-883222	
2277	Gaussin, Isla	-55.535486	-68.298768		-883114	
2278	Bullock, Isla	-55.535566	-68.037982		-874253	
2279	Hind, Isla	-55.536578	-69.279883		-884193	
2280	Duperré, Isla	-55.541468	-68.835625		-879989	
2281	Amarilla, Isla	-55.548388	-68.005516		-904978	Jaune, Isla Yellow, Isla
2282	Loewy, Isla	-55.549462	-68.538501		-889569	
2283	Simpson, Isla	-55.549787	-69.136066		-901703	
2284	Jaureguiberry, Isla	-55.549912	-68.669538		-885293	
2285	Robertson, Isla	-55.554159	-69.106868		-899483	
2286	Evout, Islas	-55.564648	-66.789255		-882487	
2287	Grevy, Isla	-55.565277	-67.661255		-883475	
2288	Trélat, Isla	-55.575587	-68.517648		-903361	
2289	Cabo, Islotes	-55.576925	-67.469071		-874397	
2290	Morton, Islas	-55.585325	-69.133457		-893058	
2291	Surgidero, Isla	-55.586448	-67.523316		-902143	
2292	Pasaje, Isla	-55.58715	-68.844349		-895271	
2293	Otter, Islotes	-55.588201	-67.522881		-894445	
2294	Otter, Isla	-55.592127	-67.522369		-894443	
2295	Diana, Isla	-55.59728	-67.554667		-879631	
2296	El Centinela, Islote	-55.604628	-68.606452		-880462	
2297	Bandurrias, Isla	-55.606381	-67.526103		-873123	
2298	Middle, Isla	-55.608285	-67.320834		-892389	
2299	Henderson, Isla	-55.613218	-69.005166		-884070	
2300	Otarie, Isla	-55.6159	-67.539771		-894437	Otaries, Isla
2301	Sanderson, Isla	-55.630466	-68.901149		-900233	
2302	Baily, Isla	-55.654682	-67.601832		-873377	Bayly, Isla
2303	Vautours, Isla	-55.658284	-67.480323		36962	
2304	Wollaston, Isla	-55.691219	-67.394981		-904864	
2305	Wollaston, Islas	-55.718273	-67.402575		-904865	
2306	Freycinet, Isla	-55.774416	-67.207351		-882858	
2307	Adriana, Islote	-55.792668	-67.267975		36942	
2308	Maxwel, Isla	-55.8015	-67.520415		-892011	Maxwell, Isla
2309	Saddle, Isla	-55.802492	-67.481344		-899858	
2310	Barnevelt, Islas	-55.822679	-66.796672		-873198	
2311	Jerdán, Isla	-55.824464	-67.483251		-885312	
2312	Hasse, Islote	-55.833333	-66.883333		36929	
2313	Herschel, Isla	-55.845023	-67.29525		-884128	
2314	Hermite, Isla	-55.847937	-67.715414		-884095	L’Hermite, Isla
2315	Arrecife, Isla	-55.850108	-67.381715		-872632	
2316	Cabo de Horno, Islas del	-55.851204	-67.598459		-884096	Hermite, Grupo Hermite, Islas L’Hermite, Islas
2317	Chanticleer, Isla	-55.863874	-67.498083		-876582	
2318	Deceit, Isla	-55.866061	-67.128731		-879409	
2319	Hall, Isla	-55.886797	-67.415866		-883985	
2320	Deceit, Islotes	-55.917065	-67.047111		36923	
2321	Hornos, Isla	-55.944078	-67.280925		-884347	
2322	Bartolomé, Isla	-56.516667	-68.733333	0.93	-873322	
2323	Diego Ramírez, Islas	-56.5	-68.733333	1.0	-879674	
2324	Bote, Isla	-56.533333	-68.733333	0.38	-883269	Gonzalo, Isla

== See also ==
- Islands of Chile
- Archipelagoes of Patagonia
- Fjords and channels of Chile
- List of fjords, channels, sounds and straits of Chile
- List of Antarctic and subantarctic islands
- List of lighthouses in Chile
