= 75th meridian west =

Line of longitude

75th meridian west

The meridian 75° west of Greenwich is a line of longitude that extends from the North Pole across the Arctic Ocean, North America, the Atlantic Ocean, the Caribbean Sea, South America, the Pacific Ocean, the Southern Ocean, and Antarctica to the South Pole.

The mean solar time of this meridian is the base for the Eastern Time Zone (UTC-5 during standard time).

Stations belonging to the US National Weather Service begin submitting weather reports when the mean solar time of this meridian is 8:00 am. Report collection ends 30–40 minutes later and the data is used to create the day's weather forecast.

The 75th meridian west forms a great circle with the 105th meridian east.

== From Pole to Pole ==
Starting at the North Pole and heading south to the South Pole, the 75th meridian west passes through:

Co-ordinates	Country, territory or sea	Notes
90°0′N 75°0′W	Arctic Ocean	
83°3′N 75°0′W	Canada	Nunavut — Ellesmere Island
78°32′N 75°0′W	Baffin Bay	
72°18′N 75°0′W	Canada	Nunavut — Baffin Island and Foley Island
68°22′N 75°0′W	Foxe Basin	Passing just to the east of Prince Charles Island, Nunavut, Canada (at 68°8′N 75°0′W)
65°22′N 75°0′W	Canada	Nunavut — Foxe Peninsula, Baffin Island
64°25′N 75°0′W	Hudson Strait	
62°16′N 75°0′W	Canada	Quebec; Ontario — from 45°36′N 75°0′W
44°59′N 75°0′W	United States	New York; Pennsylvania — from 41°31′N 75°0′W; New Jersey — from 41°4′N 75°0′W; Pennsylvania — from 40°25′N 75°0′W (passing through Northeast Philadelphia Airport); New Jersey — from 40°2′N 75°0′W
39°11′N 75°0′W	Delaware Bay	
38°50′N 75°0′W	Atlantic Ocean	Passing just east of the Delmarva Peninsula, United States (at 38°26′N 75°3′W); Passing just east of Conception Island, Bahamas (at 23°50′N 75°6′W); Passing just west of Rum Cay, Bahamas (at 23°40′N 74°57′W)
23°7′N 75°0′W	Bahamas	Long Island
23°5′N 75°0′W	Atlantic Ocean	
20°42′N 75°0′W	Cuba	
19°55′N 75°0′W	Caribbean Sea	Passing just east of Navassa Island, United States Minor Outlying Islands (at 18°24′N 75°0′W)
10°59′N 75°0′W	Colombia	
0°7′S 75°0′W	Peru	Loreto Region; Ucayali Region — from 7°59′S 75°0′W; Huánuco Region — from 8°48′S 75°0′W; Pasco Region — from 9°47′S 75°0′W; Junín Region — from 10°45′S 75°0′W; Huancavelica Region — from 11°57′S 75°0′W; Ayacucho Region — from 14°7′S 75°0′W; Ica Region — from 14°38′S 75°0′W; Arequipa Region — from 15°27′S 75°0′W
15°28′S 75°0′W	Pacific Ocean	Passing just west of Guafo Island, Chile (at 43°34′S 74°49′W); Passing just east of Guamblín Island, Chile (at 44°51′S 75°1′W)
45°52′S 75°0′W	Chile	
46°45′S 75°0′W	Pacific Ocean	Gulf of Penas
47°42′S 75°0′W	Chile	Several islands in the Patagonic Archipelago, including Wager Island, Prat Island, Serrano Island, Knorr Island, Wellington Island, Angamos Island, Madre de Dios Island, Anafur Island, Doñas Island, Valenzuela Island, Dagigno Island, Agustin Island, Diego de Almagro Island, Jorge Montt Island, Ramirez Island and Contreras Island
52°7′S 75°0′W	Pacific Ocean	
60°0′S 75°0′W	Southern Ocean	
69°31′S 75°0′W	Antarctica	Territory claimed by Chile (Antártica Chilena Province) and by the United Kingdom (British Antarctic Territory)

== See also ==
- 74th meridian west
- 76th meridian west
