= List of lighthouses in Chile: NGA2044–NGA2324 =

This is a list of lighthouses in Chile from Messier Channel to Smyth Channel.

== Messier Channel ==
It.	NGA/Int number	Location	Coordinates	Light characteristic	Height (ft/m) Range (nmi)	Structure description	Height (ft)	Remarks
440	2044; G 1558	Isla San Pedro.	47°43.2′S 74°53.0′W	Fl.W. period 10s fl. 0.3s, ec. 9.7s	128 39 16	White fiberglass tower, red band	26.	Visible 124°-328°. Aero Radiobeacon 300 meters N.
441	2048; G 1557	Isla Penguin, NE. point of island.	47°48.8′S 74°48.0′W	Fl.W. period 12s fl. 0.7s, ec. 11.3s	53 16 10	White fiberglass tower, red band	13.	Visible 139°-340°.

== Baker Channel ==
It.	NGA/Int number	Location	Coordinates	Light characteristic	Height (ft/m) Range (nmi)	Structure description	Height (ft)	Remarks
442	2049; G 1560.5	Punta Elena.	47°58.0′S 73°47.9′W	Fl.W. period 5s fl. 0.4s, ec. 4.6s	20 6 6	White fiberglass tower, red band	11.	Visible 348°-143°.
443	2049.5; G 1558.5	Punta Esmeralda.	47°51.8′S 73°46.2′W	Fl.W. period 10s fl. 0.5s, ec. 9.5s	33 10 9	White fiberglass tower, red band	11.	Visible 340°-135°.
444	2050; G 1559	Tortel Inlet	47°50.8′S 73°35.4′W	Fl.G. period 5s fl. 0.4s, ec. 4.6s	118 36 5	PORT (B) G, fiberglass tower;	11.	
445	2051; G 1560	Punta Stean.	47°56.2′S 74°32.7′W	Fl.W. period 10s fl. 0.5s, ec. 9.5s	20 6 6	White fiberglass tower, red bands	11.	Visible 187°-045°.
446	2052; G 1556	Isla Millar, E. side.	47°59.2′S 74°43.0′W	Fl.(3)W. period 9s fl. 0.5s, ec. 1.5s fl. 0.5s, ec. 1.5s fl. 0.5s, ec. 4.5s	33 10 7	White fiberglass tower, red band	13.	Visible 162°-342°.
447	2053; G 1560.2	Punta Stony.	48°01.4′S 74°20.2′W	Fl.W. period 5s fl. 0.4s, ec. 4.6s	26 8 7	White fiberglass tower, red band	11.	Visible 129°-227°.
448	2054; G 1560.4	Punta Laura.	48°03.3′S 73°53.4′W	Fl.(4)W. period 12s fl. 0.5s, ec. 1.5s fl. 0.5s, ec. 1.5s fl. 0.5s, ec. 1.5s fl. 0.5s, ec. 5.5s	23 7 4	White fiberglass tower, red band	11.	Visible 108°-319°.

== Fallos Channel ==
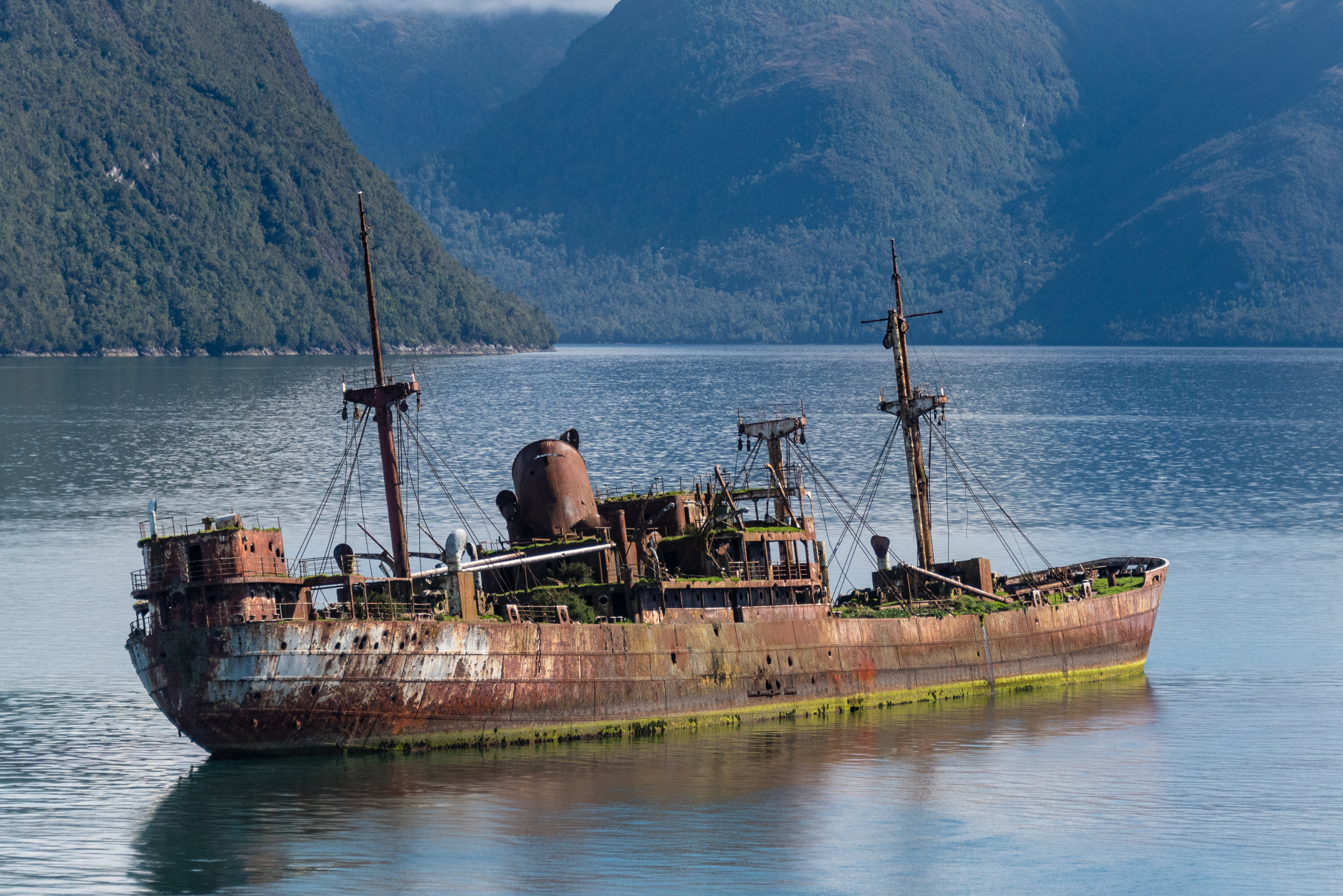
Sitting firmly on the flattened top of an underwater mountain called Bajo Cotopaxi (Cotopaxi Bank), the Captain Leonidas serves warning as both a shipwreck and lighthouse: 2068/G 1552.

It.	NGA/Int number	Location	Coordinates	Light characteristic	Height (ft/m) Range (nmi)	Structure description	Height (ft)	Remarks
449	2055; G 1558.45	Islotes Campino. -RACON	47°57.2′S 75°15.8′W	Fl.W. period 10s fl. 0.2s, ec. 9.8s T(–)	49 15 14; 18	White fiberglass tower, red band	13.	
450	2056; G 1555	Morro Cock.	48°16.0′S 74°35.0′W	Fl.W. period 10s fl. 0.7s, ec. 9.3s	46 14 8	White fiberglass tower, red band	26.	Visible 356°-164°.
451	2060; G 1554	Isla Middle, W. extremity.	48°29.8′S 74°30.8′W	Fl.W. period 5s fl. 0.4s, ec. 4.6s	66 20 8	White fiberglass tower, red band	13.	Visible 332°-185°.
452	2064; G 1553	Islote Dirección.	48°41.3′S 74°26.2′W	Fl.W. period 10s fl. 1s, ec. 9s	98 30 9	White round concrete tower, red band	33.	
453	2068; G 1552	Bajo Cotopaxi.	48°45.4′S 74°28.0′W	Fl.(2)G. period 6s fl. 0.3s, ec. 1.7s fl. 0.3s, ec. 3.7s	66 20 6	Green metal tower on the wreck Capitan Leonidas	8.	Radar reflector.
454	2072; G 1550	Isla Williams.	48°46.0′S 74°24.0′W	Fl.G. period 5s fl. 1s, ec. 4s	14 4 6	PORT (B) G,	13.	Visible 230°-097°.
455	2076; G 1548	Isla Daly.	48°52.0′S 74°29.0′W	Fl.(4)W. period 12s fl. 0.3s, ec. 1.7s fl. 0.3s, ec. 1.7s fl. 0.3s, ec. 1.7s fl. 0.3s, ec. 5.7s	36 11 8	White fiberglass tower, red band	26.	Visible 188°-335°.
456	2077; G 1547.52	Punta Oldenburg.	48°39.2′S 74°41.1′W	Fl.G. period 5s fl. 1s, ec. 4s	16 5 4	Green fiberglass tower, green square daymark	11.	Visible 091°-300°.
457	2078; G 1547.51	Punta Millanga.	48°42.7′S 74°34.7′W	Fl.G. period 3s fl. 0.3s, ec. 2.7s	16 5 4	Green fiberglass tower, green square daymark	11.	Visible 141°-327°.
458	2079; G 1547.5	Cabo Nelson.	48°40.4′S 74°27.5′W	Fl.R. period 3s fl. 0.3s, ec. 2.7s	26 8 4	Red fiberglass tower, red triangular daymark	11.	Visible 234°-065°.
459	2080; G 1547	Bahía Liberta, Puerto Gray.	48°55.8′S 74°21.6′W	Fl.W. period 5s fl. 0.4s, ec. 4.6s	92 28 8	White fiberglass tower, red band	20.	Visible 024°-334°.
460	2084; G 1546.3	Islote Edén.	49°08.5′S 74°26.6′W	Fl.(2+1)R. period 14s fl. 0.3s, ec. 1.7s fl. 0.3s, ec. 3.7s fl. 0.3s, ec. 7.7s	82 25 2	Red fiberglass tower, green band	20.	
461	2086; G 1546.8	Roca Pascua.	49°07.0′S 74°24.5′W	Fl.(2)R. period 6s fl. 0.5s, ec. 1.5s fl. 0.5s, ec. 3.5s	23 7 5	Red fiberglass tower, red triangular daymark	21.	Radar reflector.
462	2087; G 1546.7	Bajo Cápac.	49°07.5′S 74°24.5′W	Fl.(2)G. period 6s fl. 0.5s, ec. 1.5s fl. 0.5s, ec. 3.5s	20 6 5	Green fiberglass tower, green rectangular daymark	20.	Radar reflector.
463	2088; G 1546	Isla Carlos.	49°09.4′S 74°25.6′W	Fl.(3)W. period 9s fl. 0.5s, ec. 1.5s fl. 0.5s, ec. 1.5s fl. 0.5s, ec. 4.5s	21 6 6	White fiberglass tower, red band	13.	Visible 226°-137°.
464	2092; G 1545	Islotes Guía.	49°10.0′S 74°21.0′W	Fl.W. period 5s fl. 0.4s, ec. 4.6s	23 7 7	White fiberglass tower, red band	13.	
465	2096; G 1544	Islote Bouquet.	49°14.2′S 74°22.5′W	Fl.G. period 5s fl. 0.4s, ec. 4.6s	29 9 5	Green concrete tower;	20.	
466	2100; G 1542	Isla Crossover.	49°17.4′S 74°24.0′W	Fl.(4)W. period 12s fl. 0.5s, ec. 1.5s fl. 0.5s, ec. 1.5s fl. 0.5s, ec. 1.5s fl. 0.5s, ec. 5.5s	36 11 6	White fiberglass tower, red band	20.	Visible 192°-359°.
467	2104; G 1541	Isla Foot.	49°22.9′S 74°25.1′W	Fl.W. period 5s fl. 0.7s, ec. 4.3s	36 11 9	White fiberglass tower, red band	20.	Visible 003°-211°.

== Grappler Channel ==
It.	NGA/Int number	Location	Coordinates	Light characteristic	Height (ft/m) Range (nmi)	Structure description	Height (ft)	Remarks
468	2108; G 1540	Punta Hayman, Isla Saumarez, N. end of Canal Grappler.	49°25.0′S 74°24.5′W	Fl.(4)W. period 12s fl. 0.5s, ec. 1.5s fl. 0.5s, ec. 1.5s fl. 0.5s, ec. 1.5s fl. 0.5s, ec. 5.5s	33 10 7	White concrete tower, red band	20.	Visible 135°-323°.
469	2112; G 1539	Grappler Channel	49°26.9′S 74°18.3′W	Fl.W. period 5s fl. 0.4s, ec. 4.6s	52 16 6	White fiberglass tower, red band	18.	Visible 328°-123°.
470	2116; G 1538	Cerro Colorado (Red Cape), S. end of Grappler Channel	49°31.8′S 74°14.2′W	Fl.(3)W. period 9s fl. 0.5s, ec. 1.5s fl. 0.5s, ec. 1.5s fl. 0.5s, ec. 4.5s	30 9 7	White concrete tower, red band	20.	Visible 338° 36′ -146°.

== Wide Channel ==
It.	NGA/Int number	Location	Coordinates	Light characteristic	Height (ft/m) Range (nmi)	Structure description	Height (ft)	Remarks
471	2120; G 1536	Isla Mason, S. end of Canal Icy, Wide Channel	49°38.7′S 74°21.0′W	Fl.W. period 15s fl. 1s, ec. 14s	82 25 10	White octagonal concrete tower, red band	31.	Visible 198°-066°.
472	2124; G 1535	Punta Cameron.	49°54.1′S 74°24.3′W	Fl.W. period 15s fl. 1s, ec. 14s	20 6 10	White fiberglass tower, red band	13.	Visible 187°-032°.
473	2128; G 1534.7	Punta Sunbeam.	50°04.6′S 74°39.6′W	Fl.(4)W. period 12s fl. 0.5s, ec. 1.5s fl. 0.5s, ec. 1.5s fl. 0.5s, ec. 1.5s fl. 0.5s, ec. 5.5s	33 10 5	White fiberglass tower, red band	20.	Visible 106°-333°.
474	2132; G 1534.8	Punta Squire.	50°05.7′S 74°36.8′W	Fl.W. period 5s fl. 0.4s, ec. 4.6s	29 9 7	White fiberglass tower, red band	20.	Visible 039°-218°.
475	2134; G 1534.5	Cabo Primero. RACON	49°50.8′S 75°36.7′W	Fl.W. period 15s fl. 1s, ec. 14s O(– – –) period 30s	52 16 9; 15	White fiberglass tower, red band	13.	Visible 270°-167°. Visible 270°-114°.

== Trinidad Channel ==
It.	NGA/Int number	Location	Coordinates	Light characteristic	Height (ft/m) Range (nmi)	Structure description	Height (ft)	Remarks
476	2136; G 1534.3	Isla Hernando.	50°00.4′S 75°04.4′W	Fl.(4)W. period 12s fl. 0.5s, ec. 1.5s fl. 0.5s, ec. 1.5s fl. 0.5s, ec. 1.5s fl. 0.5s, ec. 5.5s	30 9 7	White fiberglass tower, red band	20.	Visible 117°-280°.
477	2140; G 1534.4	Tudor, S. side of Trinidad Channel; RACON	50°00.1′S 75°22.1′W	Fl.W. period 10s fl. 0.2s, ec. 9.8s T(–) period 30s	105 32 14	White fiberglass tower, red band	13.	Visible 074°-152° and 167°- 261°. AIS (MMSI No 997251001). Radar reflector.
478	2144; G 1534.2	Isla Medio, Trinidad Channel	50°05.8′S 74°48.3′W	Fl.W. period 5s fl. 0.4s, ec. 4.6s	39 12 5	White fiberglass tower, red band	13.	Visible 313°-188°.

== Concepción Channel ==
It.	NGA/Int number	Location	Coordinates	Light characteristic	Height (ft/m) Range (nmi)	Structure description	Height (ft)	Remarks
479	2148; G 1534	Isla Stratford, W. side of Concepción Channel	50°11.8′S 74°47.8′W	Fl.W. period 10s fl. 0.5s, ec. 9.5s	82 25 7	White octagonal concrete tower, red band	31.	Visible 220°-055°.
480	2152; G 1533	Punta San Miquel, S. extremity of Isla Drummond Hay.	50°18.0′S 74°51.9′W	Fl.W. period 5s fl. 1s, ec. 4s	20 6 8	White fiberglass tower; red band	13.	Visible 248°-162°.

== West Channel ==
It.	NGA/Int number	Location	Coordinates	Light characteristic	Height (ft/m) Range (nmi)	Structure description	Height (ft)	Remarks
481	2156; G 1531.5	Islote Bascuñán, in Fiordo Eleuterio.	50°21.5′S 75°16.8′W	Fl.(3)W. period 9s fl. 0.5s, ec. 1.5s fl. 0.5s, ec. 1.5s fl. 0.5s, ec. 4.5s	27 8 7	White fiberglass tower, red band	13.	Visible 240°-095°.
482	2160; G 1531	Islote Metalero, E. side of entrance to Fiordo Contreras.	50°26.5′S 75°20.6′W	Fl.W. period 5s fl. 0.4s, ec. 4.6s	59 18 8	White fiberglass tower, red band	13.	Visible 247°-214°.
483	2162; G 1530.6	Islote Guía.	50°28.2′S 75°16.1′W	Fl.G. period 5s fl. 0.4s, ec. 4.6s	33 10 6	PORT (B) G, fiberglass tower	13.	Visible 238°-149°.
484	2164; G 1530.3	Isla Duque de York, Punta Anunciada.	50°30.0′S 75°03.9′W	Fl.W. period 5s fl. 0.4s, ec. 4.6s	23 7 10	White fiberglass tower, red band	18.	Visible 096°-283°.
485	2168; G 1530	Isla Innocentes, E. side.	50°33.0′S 74°50.4′W	Fl.W. period 12s fl. 0.5s, ec. 11.5s	105 32 9	White concrete tower, red band	33.	Visible 142°-348°.
486	2172; G 1529	Islotes Wheeler.	50°33.9′S 74°44.2′W	Fl.W. period 5s fl. 1s, ec. 4s	26 8 6	White fiberglass tower, red band	20.	Visible 330°-160°.
487	2176; G 1528	Punta Don.	50°40.1′S 74°37.6′W	Fl.W. period 5s fl. 0.4s, ec. 4.6s	33 10 7	White fiberglass tower, red band	20.	Visible 325°-150°.

== Guía Narrows ==
It.	NGA/Int number	Location	Coordinates	Light characteristic	Height (ft/m) Range (nmi)	Structure description	Height (ft)	Remarks
488	2180; G 1526	Punta Porpoise.	50°44.4′S 74°31.4′W	Fl.G. period 5s fl. 0.4s, ec. 4.6s	52 16 6	White octagonal concrete tower, green band on top	33.	Visible 120°-320°.
489	2184; G 1527	Isla Guard.	50°44.2′S 74°31.0′W	Fl.R. period 5s fl. 0.4s, ec. 4.6s	23 7 6	White fiberglass tower, red band, red triangular daymark	13.	Visible 307°-127°.
490	2188; G 1524	Isla Escala Alta, N. point of island.	50°46.0′S 74°26.0′W	Fl.W. period 5s fl. 0.4s, ec. 4.6s	43 13 7	White octagonal concrete tower, red band	13.	Visible 116°-327°.

== Esteban Channel ==
It.	NGA/Int number	Location	Coordinates	Light characteristic	Height (ft/m) Range (nmi)	Structure description	Height (ft)	Remarks
491	2190; G 1523	Isla Don Canales.	50°52.0′S 74°21.0′W	Fl.W. period 10s fl. 1s, ec. 9s	18 6 10	White fiberglass tower, red band	13.	Visible 032°-241°.

== Sarmiento Channel ==
It.	NGA/Int number	Location	Coordinates	Light characteristic	Height (ft/m) Range (nmi)	Structure description	Height (ft)	Remarks
492	2192; G 1520	Isla Bonduca.	50°56.0′S 74°17.0′W	Fl.W. period 12s fl. 0.7s, ec. 11.3s	89 27 10	White round concrete tower, red band	33.	Visible 315°-170°.
493	2196; G 1518	Puerto Bueno, Islote Pounds.	51°00.0′S 74°14.0′W	Fl.W. period 5s fl. 0.4s, ec. 4.6s	59 18 6	White fiberglass tower, red band	20.	Visible 156°-144°. Obscured by Hoskins Island 144°-156°.
494	2200; G 1517	Punta San Marcos.	51°03.0′S 74°13.0′W	Fl.(3)W. period 9s fl. 0.5s, ec. 1.5s fl. 0.5s, ec. 1.5s fl. 0.5s, ec. 4.5s	30 9 6	White fiberglass tower, red band	13.	Visible 321°-161°.
495	2204; G 1516	Punta Plumper, Isla Lucía.	51°10.0′S 74°10.0′W	Fl.W. period 10s fl. 1s, ec. 9s	36 11 9	White concrete tower, red band	20.	Visible 340°-168°.
496	2206; G 1516.5	Isla del Medio.	51°16.9′S 74°21.6′W	Fl.W. period 5s fl. 1s, ec. 4s	26 8 9	PORT (B) G, fiberglass tower;	20.	Visible 209°-056°.
497	2208; G 1514	Punta Don Pedro, Isla Vancouver.	51°25.3′S 74°05.0′W	Fl.W. period 15s fl. 0.7s, ec. 14.3s	75 23 10	White concrete tower, red band	20.	Visible 171°-342°.
498	2212; G 1509	Isla Piazzi.	51°40.0′S 74°00.0′W	Fl.W. period 10s fl. 0.5s, ec. 9.5s	52 16 10	White fiberglass tower, red band	20.	Visible 165°-354°.
499	2216; G 1508.5	Cabo Gracias, Isla Carrington, W. side.	51°42.0′S 73°57.0′W	Fl.W. period 5s fl. 1s, ec. 4s	39 12 8	White fiberglass tower, red band	13.	Visible 336°-154°.
500	2220; G 1508	Bahía Gregg.	51°49.5′S 73°51.0′W	Fl.(3)W. period 9s fl. 0.5s, ec. 1.5s fl. 0.5s, ec. 1.5s fl. 0.5s, ec. 4.5s	43 13 7	White octagonal concrete tower, red band;	33.	Visible 150°-000°.

== Collingwood Strait ==
It.	NGA/Int number	Location	Coordinates	Light characteristic	Height (ft/m) Range (nmi)	Structure description	Height (ft)	Remarks
501	2224; G 1506	Isla Quena.	51°49.0′S 73°42.0′W	Fl.W. period 10s fl. 1s, ec. 9s	33 10 9	White fiberglass tower, red band	26.	Visible 300°-180°.
502	2228; G 1507	Punta Redfern, Isla Newton.	51°50.5′S 73°43.3′W	Fl.(4)W. period 12s fl. 0.5s, ec. 1.5s fl. 0.5s, ec. 1.5s fl. 0.5s, ec. 1.5s fl. 0.5s, ec. 5.5s	27 8 6	White fiberglass tower, red band	13.	Visible 140°-335°.
503	2232; G 1504.2	Arrecife Cloyne.	51°59.0′S 73°41.0′W	Fl.(2)G. period 6s fl. 0.3s, ec. 1.7s fl. 0.3s, ec. 3.7s	20 6 6	Green iron tower, fiberglass panels	16.	
504	2236; G 1504	Punta Cork, Isla Brinkley.	51°59.0′S 73°41.0′W	Fl.W. period 10s fl. 1s, ec. 9s	42 13 8	White hexagonal concrete tower, red band	33.	Visible 335°-204°.
505	2240; G 1504.5	Roca Bessel.	52°00.0′S 73°42.0′W	Fl.(2)R. period 6s fl. 0.5s, ec. 1.5s fl. 0.5s, ec. 3.5s	28 9 4	STARBOARD (B) R, tower	13.	

== Última Esperanza Sound ==
It.	NGA/Int number	Location	Coordinates	Light characteristic	Height (ft/m) Range (nmi)	Structure description	Height (ft)	Remarks
506	2244; G 1502	Islote Cisnes.	51°47.0′S 72°32.0′W	Fl.G. period 5s fl. 0.4s, ec. 4.6s	20 6 5	Green fiberglass post, rectangular marks	11.	

== Smyth Channel ==
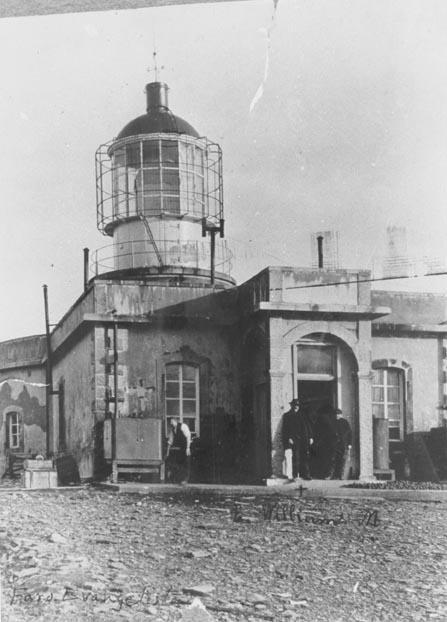
Evangelistas Lighthouse at the beginning of the 20th century

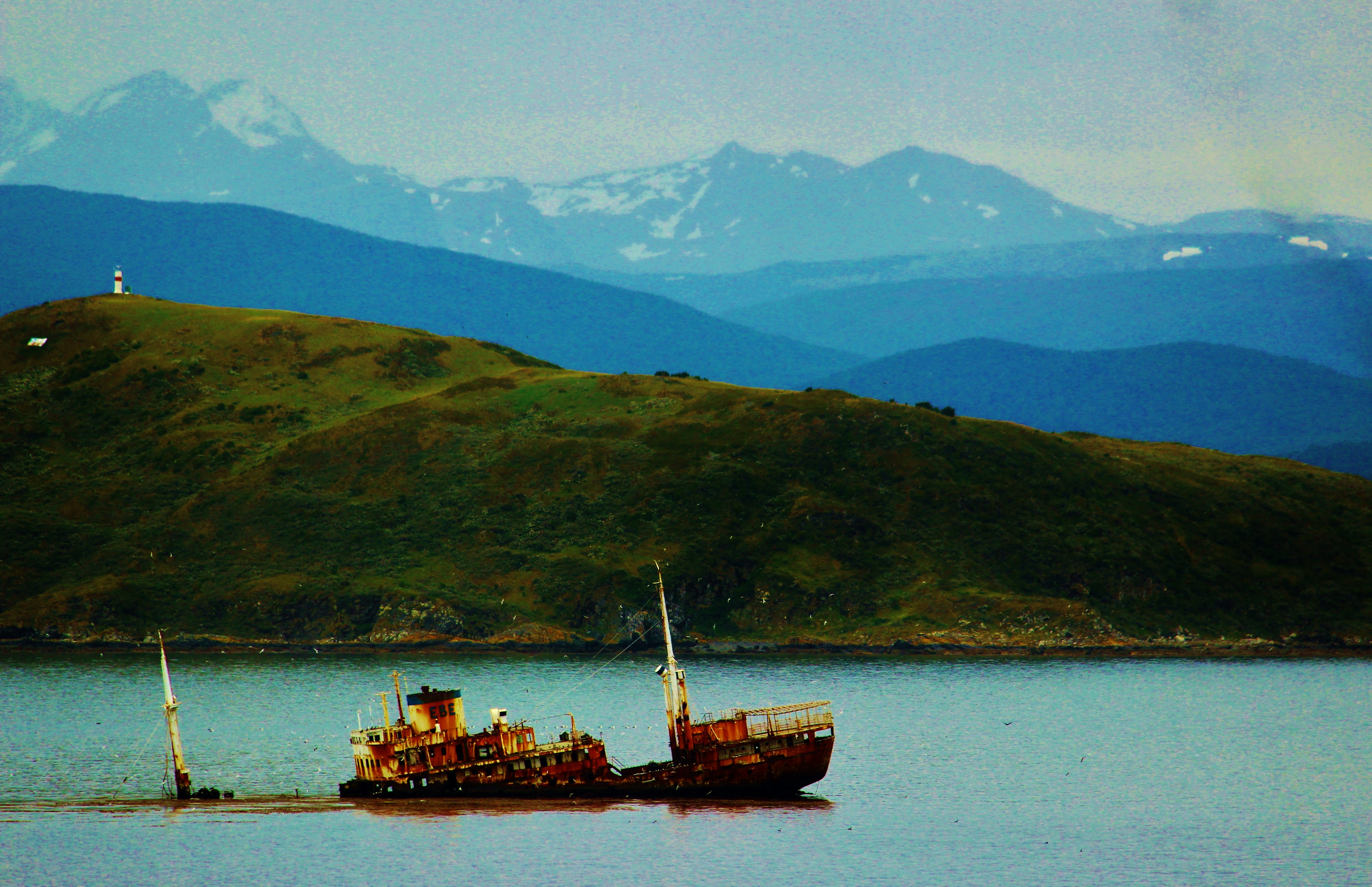
Lighthouse at the Santa Leonor shipwreck (USS Riverside)

It.	NGA/Int number	Location	Coordinates	Light characteristic	Height (ft/m) Range (nmi)	Structure description	Height (ft)	Remarks
507	2252; G 1496	Promontorio Stanley.	52°04.0′S 73°44.0′W	Fl.W. period 5s fl. 0.4s, ec. 4.6s	43 13 6	White octagonal concrete tower, red band	20.	Visible 332°-180°.
508	2254; G 1495.5	Arriagada Islands.	52°01.7′S 73°34.5′W	Fl.W. period 5s fl. 1s, ec. 4s	28 8 8	White fiberglass tower, red band	13.	Visible 344°-151°.
509	2256; G 1495	Islotes Thomson.	52°08.0′S 73°34.0′W	Fl.(3)W. period 9s fl. 0.5s, ec. 1.5s fl. 0.5s, ec. 1.5s fl. 0.5s, ec. 4.5s	34 10 7	White fiberglass tower, red band	13.	
510	2260; G 1503.5	Isla Jaime.	52°11.0′S 73°17.0′W	Fl.W. period 5s fl. 0.4s, ec. 4.6s	39 12 7	White fiberglass pillar, red band	18.	Visible 125°-267°.
511	2262; G 1503	Cabo Grey.	52°07.3′S 73°13.0′W	Fl.(3)W. period 9s fl. 0.3s, ec. 1.7s fl. 0.3s, ec. 1.7s fl. 0.3s, ec. 4.7s	30 9 6	White fiberglass tower, red band	11.	Visible 276°-098°.
512	2264; G 1494	Isla Cutler, S. end.	52°15.0′S 73°39.0′W	Fl.(4)W. period 12s fl. 0.5s, ec. 1.5s fl. 0.5s, ec. 1.5s fl. 0.5s, ec. 1.5s fl. 0.5s, ec. 5.5s	49 15 5	White fiberglass tower, red band	26.	Visible 181°-034°.
513	2268; G 1493	Islote Hozven.	52°16.5′S 73°40.8′W	Fl.W. period 5s fl. 1s, ec. 4s	23 7 6	White fiberglass tower, red band	13.	Visible 185°-036°.
514	2276; G 1492	Islote Bradbury.	52°21.0′S 73°38.0′W	Q.(9)W. period 15s	26 8 8	W. CARDINAL YBY, tower	13.	
515	2280; G 1491.5	Islote Pollo.	52°22.8′S 73°41.4′W	Fl.W. period 5s fl. 0.4s, ec. 4.6s	46 14 7	White fiberglass tower, red band	26.	
516	2288; G 1490	Roca Pearse.	52°30.5′S 73°37.1′W	Fl.(3)R. period 9s fl. 0.5s, ec. 1.5s fl. 0.5s, ec. 1.5s fl. 0.5s, ec. 4.5s	23 7 5	Red square concrete tower	12.	
517	2289; G 1490.5	Roca Alert.	52°29.8′S 73°37.3′W	Fl.(2)W. period 10s fl. 0.5s, ec. 2.4s fl. 0.5s, ec. 6.6s	20 6 6	Black fiberglass tower, red band	11.	
518	2292; G 1488	Punta George, Isla Richards.	52°31.7′S 73°37.5′W	Fl.(4)G. period 12s fl. 0.3s, ec. 1.7s fl. 0.3s, ec. 1.7s fl. 0.3s, ec. 1.7s fl. 0.3s, ec. 5.7s	26 8 6	PORT (B) G, tower	13.	Visible 168°-024°.
519	2293; G 1487	Islotes Adelaide, W. side.	52°31.9′S 73°36.8′W	Fl.(4)R. period 12s fl. 0.5s, ec. 1.5s fl. 0.5s, ec. 1.5s fl. 0.5s, ec. 1.5s fl. 0.5s, ec. 5.5s	26 8 3	Red fiberglass tower	13.	Visible 039°-222°.
520	2296; G 1486	Isla Shoal, W. side.	52°32.9′S 73°38.2′W	Fl.R. period 5s fl. 0.4s, ec. 4.6s	29 9 7	Red fiberglass tower	13.	Visible 348°-209°.
521	2297; G 1486.5	Islotes Evans, E. side.	52°32.6′S 73°39.3′W	Fl.W. period 5s fl. 0.4s, ec. 4.6s	26 8 5	White fiberglass tower, red band	13.	Visible 237°-084°.
522	2298; G 1485	Promontorio Sivel, W. side.	52°33.6′S 73°36.9′W	Fl.(3)W. period 9s fl. 0.5s, ec. 1.5s fl. 0.5s, ec. 1.5s fl. 0.5s, ec. 4.5s	23 7 5	White concrete tower, red band	14.	Visible 290°-122°.
523	2300; G 1484	Punta Buckley.	52°34.0′S 73°38.1′W	Fl.(2)G. period 6s fl. 0.3s, ec. 1.7s fl. 0.3s, ec. 3.7s	20 6 6	Green fiberglass tower	13.	Visible 167°-020°.
524	2304; G 1483	Islote Green, E extremity.	52°36.1′S 73°40.7′W	Fl.W. period 10s fl. 0.5s, ec. 9.5s	38 12 8	White fiberglass tower, red band	26.	Visible 164°-045°.
525	2308; G 1482.5	Cabo Walker.	52°37.4′S 73°40.2′W	Fl.(3)W. period 9s fl. 0.5s, ec. 1.5s fl. 0.5s, ec. 1.5s fl. 0.5s, ec. 4.5s	39 12 7	White fiberglass tower, red band	13.	Visible 035°-188°.
526	2312; G 1482	Islote Lautaro.	52°42.8′S 73°46.9′W	Fl.G. period 5s fl. 1s, ec. 4s	20 6 6	Green fiberglass tower	13.	Visible 225°-037°.
527	2316; G 1481	Islote Óscar.	52°43.7′S 73°43.9′W	Fl.R. period 5s fl. 0.4s, ec. 4.6s	26 8 3	STARBOARD (B) R, tower	19.	Visible 035°-198°.
528	2320; G 1480	Islote Fairway.	52°43.9′S 73°46.9′W	Fl.W. period 5s fl. 0.3s, ec. 4.7s	128 39 19	White hexagonal concrete tower, red band	18.	Obscured 266°-268°. Signal station.
529	2322; G 1480.5	Isla Boston.	52°47.0′S 73°46.8′W	Fl.R. period 5s fl. 0.4s, ec. 4.6s	20 6 6	STARBOARD (B) R, tower	11.	Visible 070°-209°.
530	2324; G 1498	Evangelistas Islets. RACON N(– •)	52°24.0′S 75°06.0′W	Fl.W. period 10s fl. 0.3s, ec. 9.7s period 30s	190 58 30; 15	White steel tower, red concrete structure	43.	Obscured by islands 186°- 194°, 250°-260°, 312° 30′ -318°. Signal station.

== See also ==
- List of fjords, channels, sounds and straits of Chile
- List of islands of Chile
