= Messier Channel =

Channel located in Patagonia, Chile

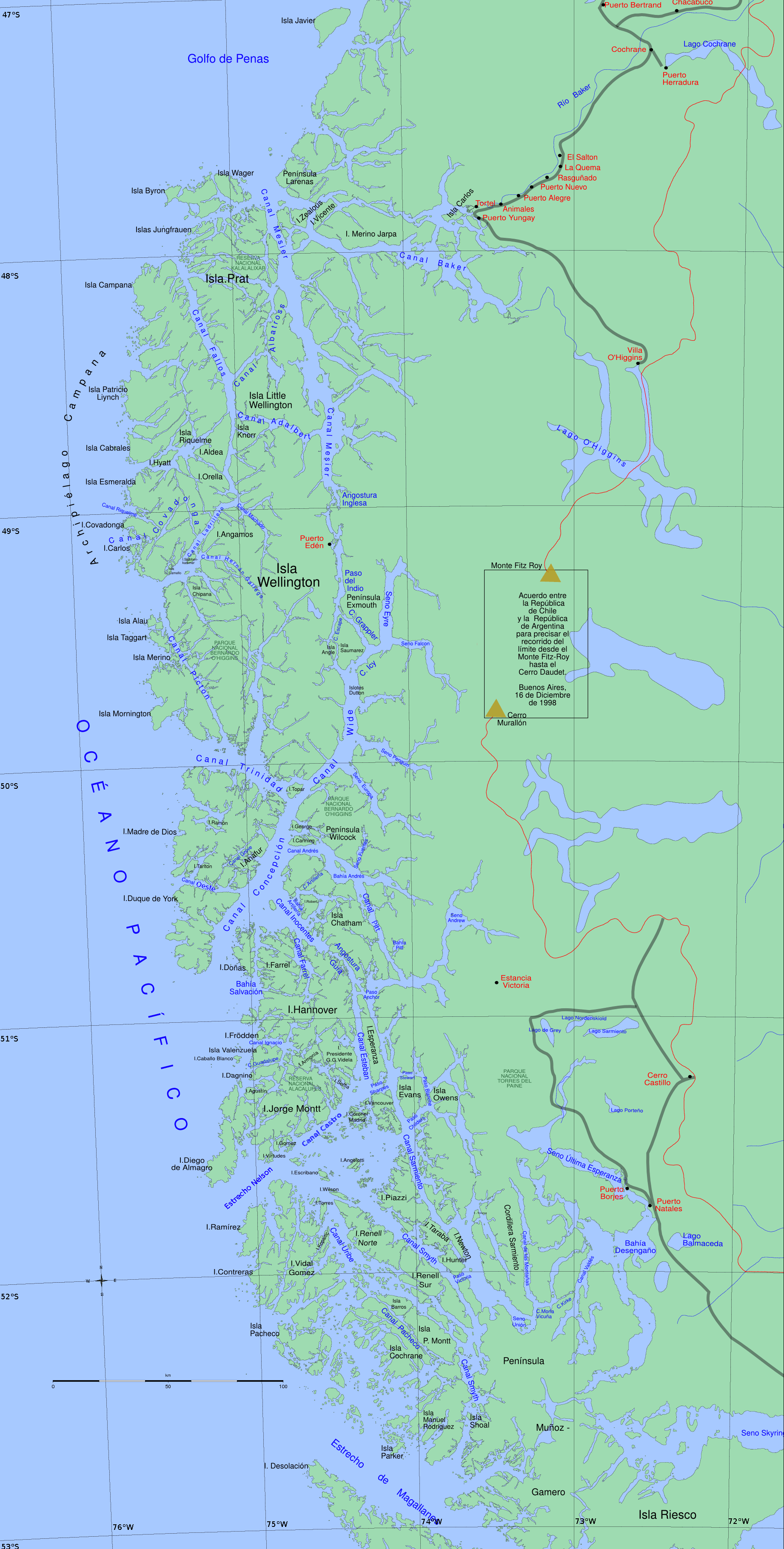
Messier Channel

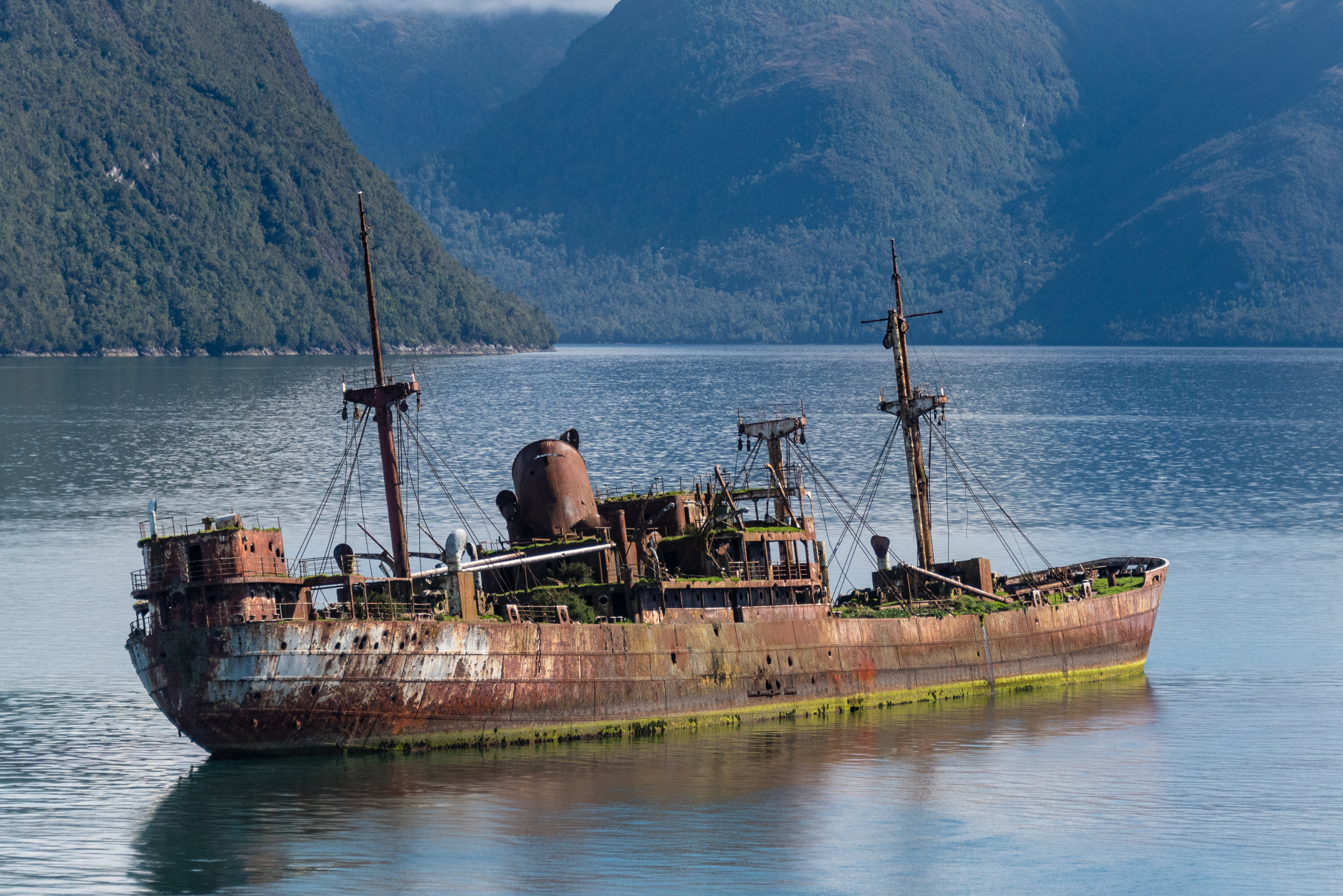
Wreck of the Captain Leonidas in the Messier Channel

Messier Channel is a channel located in western Patagonia, Chile. It trends north–south between Wellington Island and other Pacific islands and the continent.

Maritime traffic traveling south from the Gulf of Penas passes between Wager Island to the west and the Larenas Peninsula to the east to enter the Messier Channel. There is a lighthouse (NGA 2044) on Islote San Pedro, which is just to the east of Wager Island. Continuing further south, ships pass by Prat Island, Serrano Island, and Wellington Island. Southward the name of this inside passage changes first to Angostura Inglesa (English Narrows) and then to Paso del Indio (Indian Passage).

The channel is named after Charles Messier, who was a French astronomer. It is a fjord in the Scandinavian sense of the word. A depth of 1,358 m has been measured in the north part of this channel, making it one of the deepest fjords in the world. Messier Channel is surrounded by the Bernardo O'Higgins National Park and the Katalalixar National Reserve.

The Fallos-Ladrillero-Picton Channel combination is an optional route to the Messier-Grappler-Wide Channel route between the Golfo de Penas and the Trinidad Channel.

At 48.745850S, 74.428750W is the wreck of MV Captain Leonidas, a freighter that ran aground on the Bajo Cotopaxi (Cotopaxi Bank) in 1968. The hulk provides warning as both a shipwreck and lighthouse (NGA-nr: 2068, Adm.: G 1552), marking the northern terminus of Angostura Inglesa (English Narrows),

== See also ==
- List of islands of Chile
- List of fjords, channels, sounds and straits of Chile
- List of Antarctic and subantarctic islands
- List of lighthouses and lightvessels in Chile
