= Chilean ship Casma =

Casma is the name of the following ships of the Chilean Navy:

- Chilean transporter Casma, launched in 1889 as Aquila, commissioned 1892–1905 and 1908–1917, lent to Ecuador as Marañón 1905–1908, sunk 1917
- Chilean corvette Casma, ex-HMCS Stellarton, a Flower-class corvette launched in 1944, in commission 1946–1967, scrapped 1969

== See also ==
- Casma (disambiguation)
