= Guía Narrows =

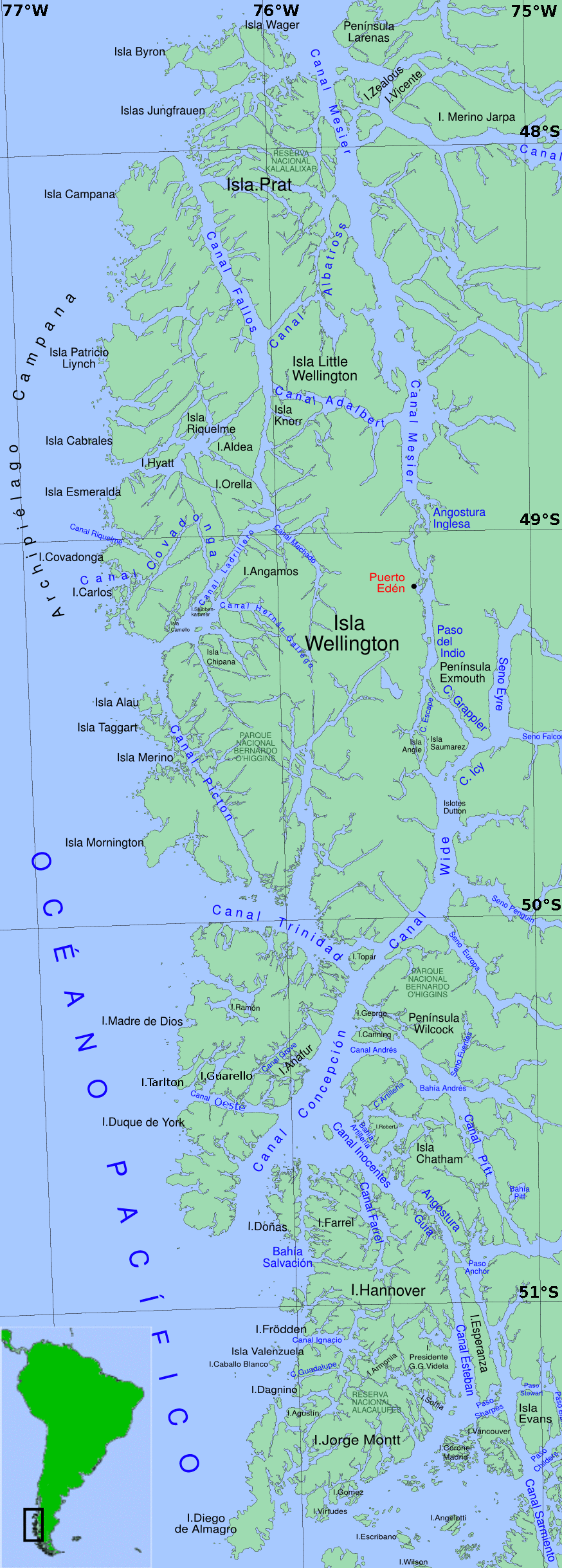
Islands and Bodies of water between Hanover Island and Wellington Island.

The Guía Narrows (Spanish Angostura Guías) are located between Chile's Hanover and Chatham Islands. Guia Narrows connects Sarmiento and Inocentes Channels. The narrows are 6 miles long and are 1 to 1.5 miles wide, except at the north end, between Porpoise Point, low and sharp, on the west side, and Guard Island on the east, where the breadth is about 400 yards, but generally, there is no danger; the shores being steep-to on either side. Sometimes, the tide sweeps strongly around the point; therefore, it would be advisable to keep closer to Guard Island while passing through.
