= Aldea Island (Campana Archipelago) =

Island off the coast of southern Chile

Native name: Isla Aldea
- Location within Chile

Geography
- Coordinates: 48.73°S 75.12°W
- Archipelago: Campana Archipelago
- Adjacent to: Pacific Ocean
- Area: 202.1 km^{2} (78.0 sq mi)
- Coastline: 87.4 km (54.31 mi)

Administration
- Chile
- Region: Magallanes
- Province: Última Esperanza
- Commune: Puerto Natales

Additional information
- NGA UFI -871677

Aldea Island is located between the Fallos Channel (continuation of Ladrillero Channel) and South of Campana Island.
