= MV Captain Leonidas (1937) =

Shipwreck in Messier Channel

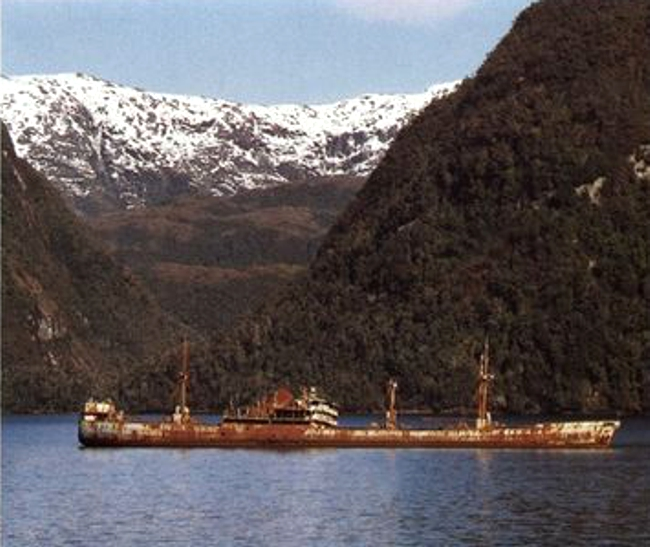
- Wreck of Captain Leonidas in the Messier Channel, Chile (1989)

History
- Name: Captain Leonidas
- Builder: Deutsche Schiff- und Maschinenbau, Bremen
- Yard number: 916
- Launched: 1937
- Completed: 1937
- Fate: Ran aground, 7 April 1968

General characteristics
- Type: Cargo ship
- Tonnage: 5,137 GRT
- Length: 132.6 m (435 ft 0 in)
- Beam: 17 m (55 ft 9 in)
- Draught: 7.7 m (25 ft 3 in)
- Installed power: 3,600 bhp (2,700 kW)
- Propulsion: 2 × MAN diesel engines, single screw
- Speed: 13.5 knots (25.0 km/h; 15.5 mph)
- Crew: 25

MV Captain Leonidas was a Greek-owned cargo motor vessel that ran aground in the Messier Channel in Chile on 7 April 1968. The wreck remains visible on the Bajo Cotopaxi reef and is a well-known navigational landmark in the Patagonian channels.

== Ship history ==
The vessel was built in 1937 in Bremen, Germany, by Deutsche Schiff- and Maschinenbau. It was originally launched as the Norwegian cargo ship Molda and operated under Norwegian ownership for several decades. During its career, the ship underwent several name changes, including Molda County and Fana, before being sold to a Greek operator and renamed Captain Leonidas in the mid-1960s.

== Grounding ==
On 7 April 1968, Captain Leonidas ran aground on the Bajo Cotopaxi (Cotopaxi Bank) in the Messier Channel while en route from Santos, Brazil, to Valparaíso, Chile. The vessel could not be refloated and remained stranded. There were no reported casualties.

Some online accounts have described the grounding as deliberate and linked it to an attempted insurance fraud; however, these claims are not consistently reported in reliable secondary sources and remain unconfirmed.

== Location ==
The wreck lies in the Messier Channel of western Patagonia, Chile, just north of the Angostura Inglesa. The channel is a deep fjord-like waterway, with depths exceeding 1,000 metres in places. The hull of Captain Leonidas rests on the shallow Bajo Cotopaxi reef, in contrast to the surrounding deep water. The wreck serves as a navigational reference point and is marked on nautical charts.

== The wreck today ==
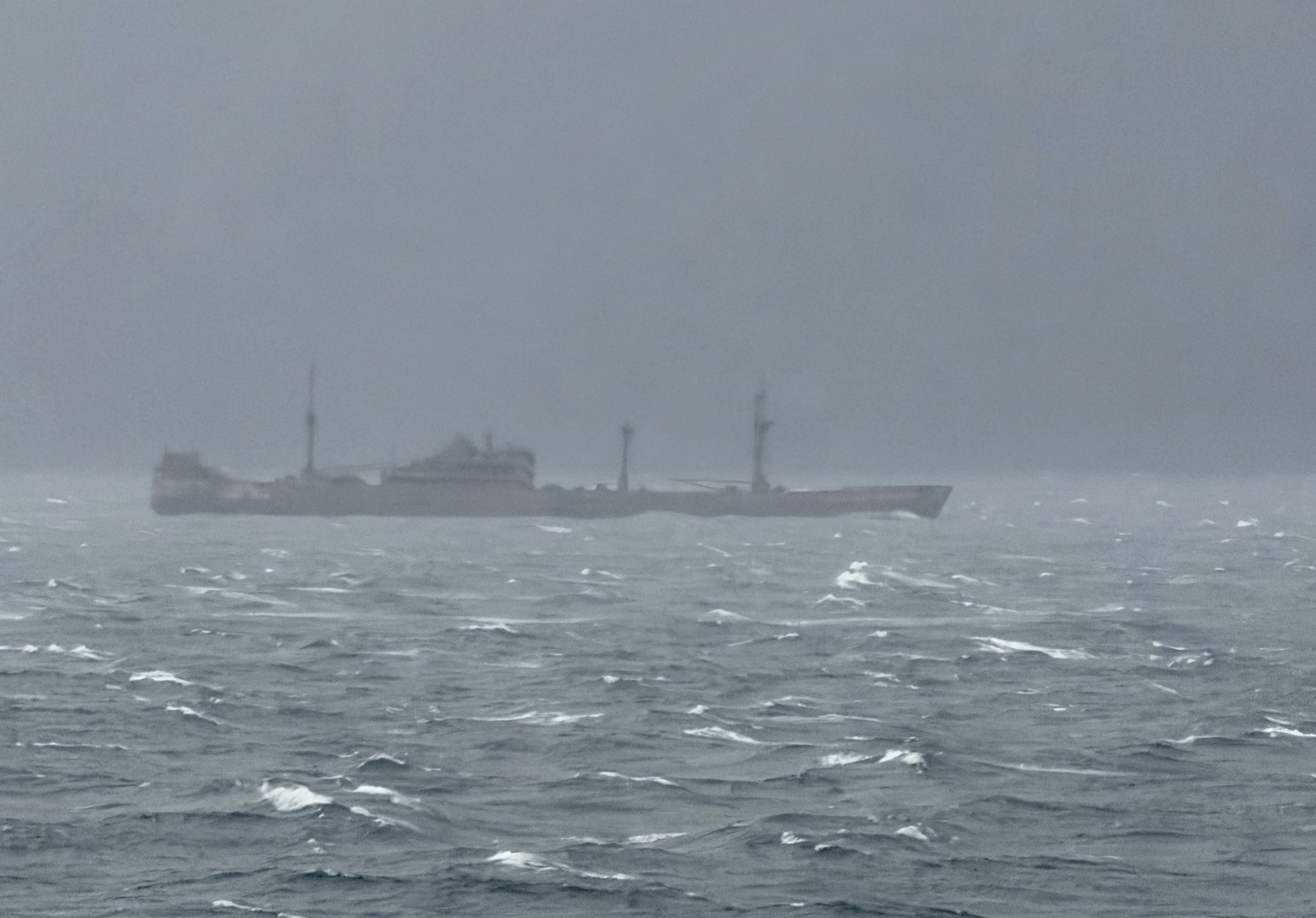
Captain Leonidas during rough weather in March 2026.

The remains of the vessel are still visible above the waterline and are frequently observed by ships transiting the Patagonian channels, including ferry services operating between Puerto Montt and Puerto Natales. Additionally the wreck still serves as lighthouse (NGA-nr: 2068, Adm.: G 1552), marking the northern terminus of Angostura Inglesa (English Narrows).

Photographs and observations indicate that the structure has deteriorated significantly over time.

== See also ==
- Patagonian Channels
- Bernardo O'Higgins National Park
- List of lighthouses in Chile
