= Francisco de Cortés Hojea =

Francisco Cortés Ojea (also spelled Hojea or Ojeda) was a 16th-century Spanish sailor and explorer who took part in the first expeditions sent from the General Captaincy of Chile to the Strait of Magellan. The times and places of his birth and death have not been documented.

He was a map-maker with the expedition of Francisco de Ulloa sent in 1553 by the governor of Chile to survey the southern coast of the country and the Strait of Magellan. He later commanded the San Sebastián under the orders of captain Juan Ladrillero in the expedition sent in 1557 by governor García Hurtado de Mendoza.

== Context ==
On May 29, 1555, Joanna of Castile, the princess-regent of Spain, issued a real cédula (royal ordinance) ordering the governor of Chile to conduct a recognizance of the lands situated in the other part of the Strait of Magellan. Spain expected to find there a region rich in spices and resources as valuable as those the Portuguese were drawing from the East Indies.

== Expedition of Francisco de Ulloa ==
In 1552 Pedro de Valdivia, governor of Chile, decided to send an expedition of two ships of 50 toneles each under Francisco de Ulloa to explore the southern coast of the country, including the strait of Magellan.

The expedition took on supplies in the port of Valdivia at the end of October 1553 and sailed along the west coast of the island of Chiloé and of the Chonos Archipelago, and continued to the west of the channels of Patagonia, arriving 5 January 1554 at a bay (San Simeón or San Francisco). From there the expedition continued south, entering into the strait and travelling about 90 miles into it. Given the lateness of the season and a lack of supplies, de Ulloa decided to return north and did so, helped by a wind from the south that accompanied him. He dropped anchor at Valdivia in mid-February. On this expedition, Cortés Ojea acted as the flotilla's mapmaker.

== Expedition of captain Juan Ladrillero ==
In 1557, the new governor of Chile, Don García Hurtado de Mendoza, ordered another expedition under the command of Juan Ladrillero. It consisted of two ships of 450 toneles each, with a crew of sixty men. The San Luis was commanded by Ladrillero himself and the other ship, the San Sebastián, was placed under the command of Cortés Ojea.

They equipped their vessels in Valdivia on 17 November 1557 and after sailing for eight days arrived at a bay they called Nuestra Señora del Valle, probably at the entrance of the Fallos Channel. There they made their first contact with the indigenous people of the region, the Kawésqar. Ladrillero had one of them come aboard as an interpreter for the remainder of the voyage. They set off again on 6 December and on the 9th the two ships were separated in a violent storm and lost one another.

Cortés Ojea, on the San Sebastián, travelled the channels and islands that form the archipelagos now known as Madre de Dios Island, Mornington Island and Queen Adelaide Archipelago. Short of supplies because most of the provisions had been on Ladrillero's ship, he reached the mouth of the strait but did not recognize it. On 23 January 1558 he and his crew decided to return to the north. They had reached the latitude of 52.5° south without finding the entrance to the strait, although they were very close. On 27 January they turned north, sailing up the Pacific hugging the coast, encountering many dangers due to bad weather.

The San Sebastián was in very poor condition, taking on water everywhere, its sails unusable. Finally on 15 February a storm blew them into a sheltered bay, probably on an island west of Wellington Island.

Cortés Ojea's crew began building a brigantine so they would be able to set sail again. Some crewmen disassembled the San Sebastian to salvage its planks and nails and felled trees to make masts and replace planks. Others fished to supply the crew with food. During their enforced stay the Spaniards were attacked by the Kawésqar and had to hold them off with musket fire. After two months of work the ship was ready to take on supplies, but the moment wasn't right for taking to the high seas on this boat and they had to wait until July 25, 1558 to launch her.

They used the sails and the oars to travel, stopping at night to rest. At the end of September they had reached the north of the Chiloé archipelago. They were already short of rations, but they met indigenous people, less warlike than the ones they had met further south, who supplied them with food, with which they were able to reach Valdivia on October 1, 1558.

The return of Cortés Ojea struck the conquistadors as ominous. They had had no news of Juan Ladrillero. Having reached the latitude where the western mouth of the strait was supposed to be, Cortés Ojea had concluded that following some sort of cataclysm, an island must have blocked its entrance. For a time this hypothesis spread among the population, and the poet Alonso de Ercilla picked up this account in the first song of La Araucana. (Ercilla had left for Peru before Ladrillero returned and to tell his tale of exploring the strait).

== See also ==
- Spanish colonization of the Americas
- Strait of Magellan
- Patagonia
- Cosmography
- Fjords and channels of Chile
- History of Chile

=== Bibliography ===
- Anuario Hidrográfico de la Marina de Chile: Año V, Viaje del capitán Juan Ladrillero al descubrimiento del Estrecho de Magallanes, Imprenta Nacional, Santiago, 1879
- Instituto Geográfico Militar, Atlas de la República de Chile, Santiago, 1970, 2nd edition
- (es) Instituto Hidrográfico de la Armada de Chile, Atlas Hidrográfico de Chile, Valparaíso - Chili - Instituto Hidrográfico de la Armada, 1974, 1st edition.
- (es) Instituto Hidrográfico de la Armada de Chile, Derrotero de la Costa de Chile Volume III, Valparaíso - Chili - Instituto Hidrográfico de la Armada, 1982, 5th edition.
- Diego Barros Arana, Historia general de Chile – Volume II, Editorial Universitaria S.A. Santiago de Chile, 1999, 2nd edition. (ISBN 956-11-1534-4)

=== External links ===
- (Spanish)
- Navegantes europeos en el estrecho de Magallanes - Juan Ladrillero - Francisco Cortés Hojea
