= Picton Channel =

Waterway in Chile

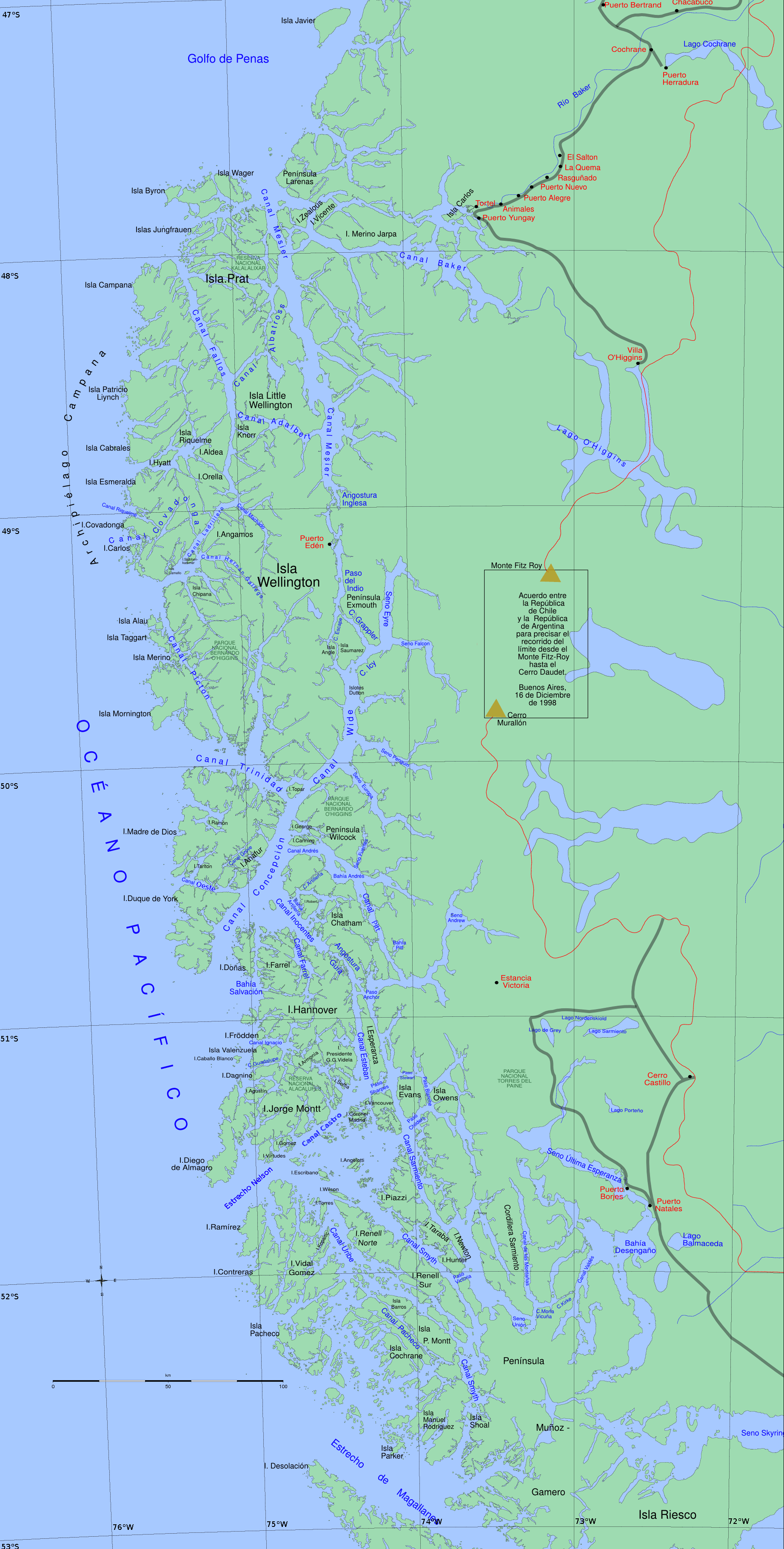
Picton Channel

Picton Channel (Spanish: Canal Picton) is a waterway in the Magallanes Region of Chile that continues southward the Ladrillero Channel, and it runs between the Chipana Island (east) and Mornington Island (Chile) (west).

With the Ladrillero and Fallos Channel, it forms an optional route to the Messier Channel-Grappler Channel-Wide Channel. It has several arms or fjords.

The United States Hydrographic Office, South America Pilot (1916) states:

Picton Channel, with an average breadth of 1 1/2 miles, extends to the northward and westward for about 20 miles, with bold shores intersected by inlets on either side and deep water in mid-channel. Mornington Island, the western shore, then becomes low and dips gradually to the northward till it ends 36 miles from Trinidad Channel in an extensive area of rocks, islets, and disconnected breakers, with no prominent islets fit for leading marks to guide a vessel through the channels to the sea.

== History ==
On 2 January 1916, not far from Golfo Ladrillero, the Chilean ship Casma run aground at the shore of the Picton Channel.

== See also ==
- Picton Island located at the eastend of the Beagle Channel
- List of islands of Chile
- List of fjords, channels, sounds and straits of Chile
- List of Antarctic and subantarctic islands
- List of lighthouses and lightvessels in Chile
