= Trinidad Channel =

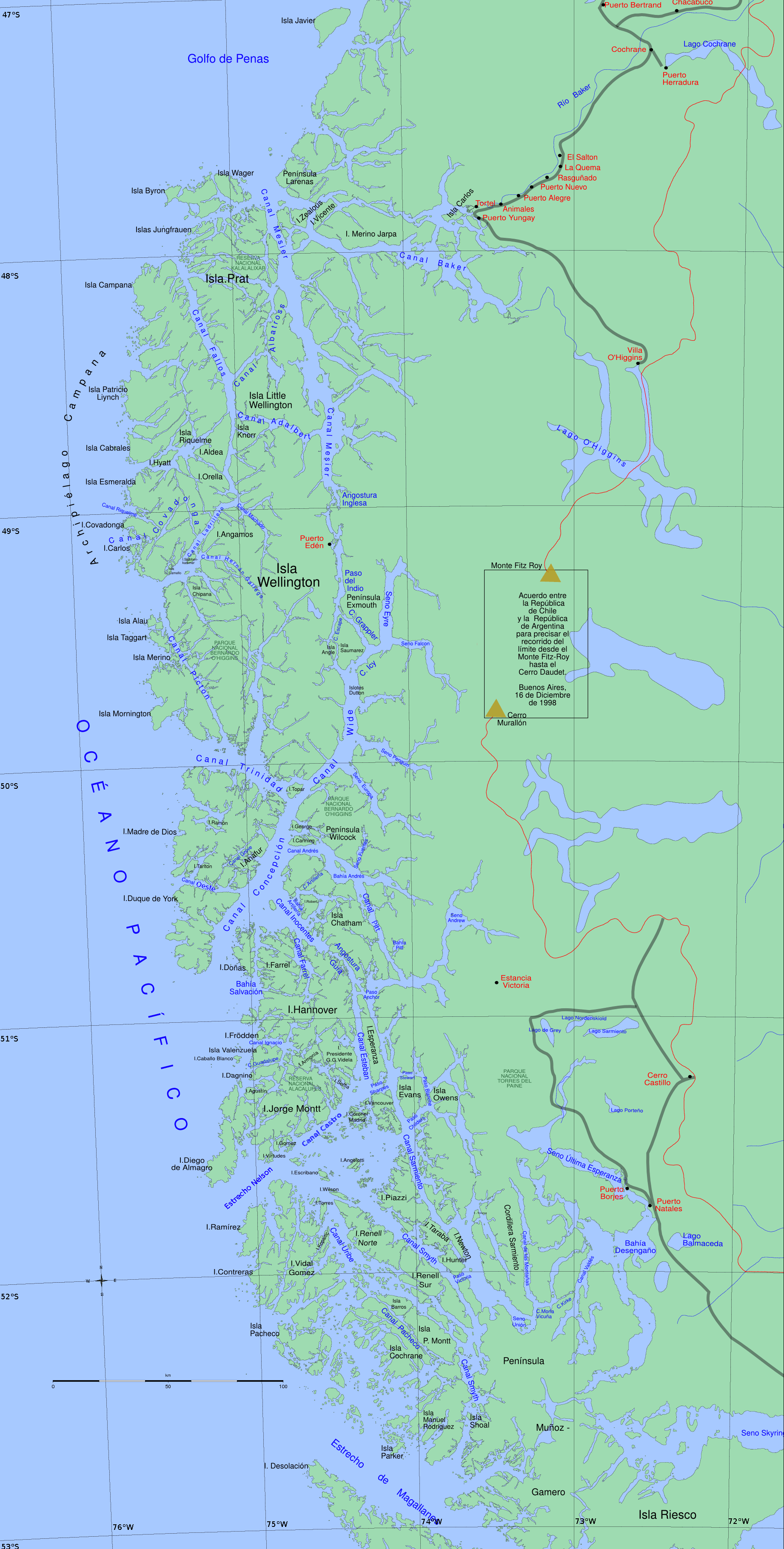
Islands and Bodies of water between Hanover Island and Wellington Island.

Trinidad Channel is a channel in Chile that leads to seaward from the northern end of Concepción Channel, is exceedingly useful to pass out to the Pacific Ocean from the Patagonian Channels in case it is desirable to avoid the possible delay occasioned by English Narrows in Messier Channel. Alert Harbor, at its western end, will, afford shelter to a number of large vessels.

From Trinidad Channel vessels can gain the Gulf of Penas by Picton, Ladrillero and Fallos Channels, but that route, although having some advantage in avoiding English Narrows, is not considered so safe as the well-known route by Wide and Messier Channels.

== See also ==
- Fjords and channels of Chile
