= Campana Island =

Island in Chile

Native name: Isla Campana
- Location within Chile

Geography
- Coordinates: 48.35°S 75.30°W
- Archipelago: Campana
- Adjacent to: Pacific Ocean
- Area: 1,187.8 km^{2} (458.6 sq mi)
- Coastline: 589.2 km (366.11 mi)

Administration
- Chile
- Region: Aysén Region
- Province: Capitán Prat Province
- Communes of Chile: Tortel

Additional information
- NGA UFI=-874903

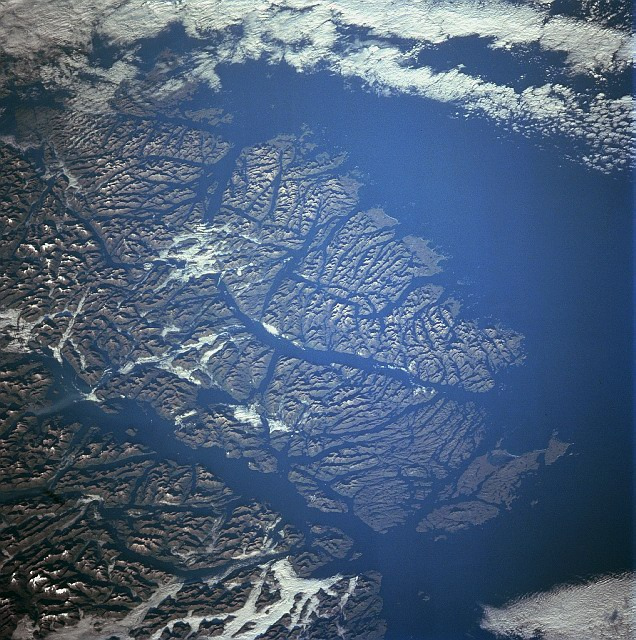
Campana Island

Campana Island is an island in the Aysén Region of Chile. Its land area is 1,188 square kilometres (459 sq mi). It is west of Prat Island and Serrano Island, north of Aldea Island, and northeast of Patricio Lynch Island and Cabrales Island.

== See also ==
- List of islands of Chile
