= List of shipwrecks of South America =

This is a list of shipwrecks located in or around South America.

== Argentina ==
Ship	Flag	Sunk date	Notes	Coordinates
ARA Comodoro Py	Argentine Navy	15 June 1987	A Gearing-class destroyer that was sunk as a target in Samborombón Bay.	36.250°S 57.000°W
Crown of Italy	United Kingdom	23 December 1891	A British sailing ship that ran aground at Cabo San Diego. Abandoned early the next morning and using the ship's boats, her crew of 33 made landfall on Staten Island on Christmas day. The crew were stranded there for 83 days before being picked up by HMS Cleopatra. All were saved.	54°38′S 65°07′W
Desdemona		9 September 1985	A cargo ship that ran aground at Cabo San Pablo.	54°17′51.34″S 66°41′58.82″W
Duchess of Albany		13 July 1893	A sailing ship that sank off Tierra del Fuego.	54°38′S 65°31′W
ARA General Belgrano	Argentine Navy	2 April 1982	A Brooklyn-class light cruiser that was torpedoed by HMS Conqueror during the Falklands/Malvinas War. The ship was outside the Total Exclusion Zone at the time, leading to controversy over whether the attack was justified.	55°24′S 61°32′W
Potosi	Chile	19 October 1925	A barque that caught fire and was scuttled near Comodoro Rivadavia.	45°2.5′S 66°2.5′W
Sarmiento		2 April 1912	A passenger and cargo ship that sank in the Beagle Channel.	54°51′40.49″S 67°51′22.39″W
St. Christopher	Costa Rica	1957	A salvage tug that was beached and abandoned at Ushuaia.	54.809694°S 68.308117°W
Usurbil		March 1993	A fishing trawler that was destroyed by fire while at port at Ingeniero White, Buenos Aires. The wreck was moved to Bahía Blanca in 1999.	38°49′36″S 62°15′55″W

== Brazil ==
Ship	Flag	Sunk date	Notes	Coordinates
Aquidabã	Imperial Brazilian Navy	21 January 1906	A Brazilian ironclad warship that sank after exploding near the Jacuacanga strait, in Angra dos Reis bay.	
Bezerra de Menezes		1891	Cargo ship that sank after a collision.	
California		1866	Rare 1806 "direct acting engine" steamer, with a centered propulsion wheel, carrying personal care articles. Sunk after a pirate raid at Ilha Grande, Angra dos reis.	
Campos		23 October 1943	Torpedoed by the German submarine U-170.	
SMS Cap Trafalgar	Germany	14 September 1914	Sunk by British HMS Carmania off the coast of the Island of Trindade, Brazil, South Atlantic Ocean during World War I.	20°29′S 29°18′W}
Elihu B. Washburne		1943	Sunk in Santos Bay.	
Kapunda	United Kingdom	20 January 1887	An emigrant ship that was travelling from London to Australia when it collided with the barque Ada Melmore, with 299 lives lost.	
Kestrel	United Kingdom	11 February 1895		
La Louise		1718	Pirate ship under the command of Olivier Levasseur (La Buse) that sank at Cotinga Island, Paranaguá after hitting a rock during a storm.	
RMS Magdalena	United Kingdom	26 April 1949	A refrigerator ship that ran aground and then split in two in the Guanabara Bay while under tow.	22°57′05″S 43°7′30″W
Novo Amapa		6 January 1981	Capsized in the Amazon River, at Cajari, Macapá.	
Pinguino		1967	A grain cargo ship that sunk after a fire aboard. A popular dive site at Ilha Grande.	
Príncipe de Asturias	Spain	5 March 1916	An ocean liner that ran aground on a shoal near Ilhabela, São Paulo, resulting in at least 445 deaths.	
Sir Foxwell Buxton	United Kingdom	1853	An emigrant ship that ran aground off the coast of Rio Grande do Norte.	
Sobral Santos II	Brazil	19 September 1981	Capsized in the Amazon River, at Óbidos, Pará. Around 250 to 300 people were killed, 178 people survived.	
Stag Hound	United States	2 August 1861	An extreme clipper that caught fire and sank near Pernambuco.	
Tocantins		1933	Sunk at the Queimada Grande Island, due to heavy fog.	
U-128	Kriegsmarine	16 May 1943	Attacked by US Navy aircraft and destroyers off the coast of Recife. After considerable shelling and aerial bombing that rendered her dead in the water, the crew scuttled her the next day.	11°0′S 35°43′W

== Chile ==
Ship	Flag	Sunk date	Notes	Coordinates
Almirante Latorre	Chilean Navy	2005	Sank in the South Pacific while under tow to be broken up.	
Ambassador	United Kingdom	1940s	A clipper that was beached at San Gregorio.	52.567529°S 70.068537°W
Angamos	Chile	1928	Sank after striking rocks near Lebu. Second biggest single-incident maritime losses of life in the history of Chile.	
Blanco Encalada	Chilean Navy	1891	Destroyed by a torpedo gunboat in the port of Caldera during the 1891 Chilean Civil War.	
Casma	Chilean Navy	1916	Ran aground in Picton Channel.	
Cazador	Chilean Navy	1856	A steamboat that was driven aground off Point Carranza, 10 km (6.2 mi) south of Constitución, resulting in the loss of 300–400 lives. The biggest single-incident maritime losses of life in the history of Chile.	
HMS Challenger	Royal Navy	1835	Wrecked off Mocha Island.	
County of Peebles	Chile	1960s	A windjammer that was beached as a breakwater at Punta Arenas.	
HMS Doterel	Royal Navy	1881	A Doterel-class sloop that exploded while anchored at Punta Arenas.	
SMS Dresden	Imperial German Navy	1915	A Dresden-class light cruiser that was scuttled near Robinson Crusoe Island.	33°36′6″S 78°49′30″W
El Canelo		1960	Sank in the mouth of Valdivia River after the 1960 Valdivia earthquake in 1960.	
Esmeralda	Chilean Navy	1879	Sank during the Battle of Iquique.	
ARA Fournier	Argentine Navy	4 October 1949	Sank in Gabriel Channel at the Dawson Island. 72 men were lost.	
HMS Good Hope	Royal Navy	1914	A Drake-class armored cruiser that was destroyed in the Battle of Coronel.	36°59′1″S 73°48′49″W
	Argentine Navy	1958	Sank off Nueva Island. 38 men lost.	
Independencia	Peruvian Navy	1879	Ran aground and was burnt during the Battle of Punta Gruesa.	
Janequeo	Chilean Navy	1965	Sank with the loss of 65 men.}	
John Elder		1892	Sank near Punta Carranza.	
Kate Kellok		1878		
Logos		1988	A missionary ship owned by Operation Mobilisation, that ran aground on rocks in the Beagle Channel.	54°58′12.84″S 67°7′25.71″W
BAP Manco Cápac	Peruvian Navy	1880	Scuttled to prevent her capture by the Chilean military after the Battle of Arica.	
HMS Monmouth	Royal Navy	1914	A Monmouth-class armored cruiser that was destroyed in the Battle of Coronel.	36°53′53″S 73°50′45″W
Monteagudo	Chile	1839	Sank off Valparaíso.	
O'Higgins	Argentine Navy	1826	Sank off Cape Horn. Probably the biggest single-incident maritime loss of life in the history of Chile.	
Olympian	United States	1906	A steamboat that was wrecked at Possession Bay while under tow.	52°14′51.67″S 69°1′55.46″W
Oriflamme	Spain	1770	Sank near the mouth of the Huenchullami River.	
Sancti Espiritus	Spain	1526	First European ship to run aground in the Strait of Magellan.	
Santa Leonor	United States	1966	Ran aground in Smyth Channel.	
HMS Wager	Royal Navy	1741	Ran aground at Wager Island.	47°40′43″S 75°02′57″W

== Ecuador ==
Ship	Flag	Sunk date	Notes	Coordinates
Jesus Maria de la Limpia Concepcion	Spain	1654	Spanish treasure ship also known as the Capitana, lost after striking a reef off Chanduy.	
Santa Maria de la Consolacion	Spain	1681	Spanish treasure ship laden with gold, silver, and precious gems run against a reef by pursuing pirates. Discovered in 1998.	

== Falkland Islands ==
Ship	Flag	Sunk date	Notes	Coordinates
HMS Antelope	Royal Navy	24 May 1982	A Type 21 frigate that was sunk by Argentine bomber aircraft during the Falklands War.	51°33′3″S 59°3′30″W
HMS Ardent	Royal Navy	22 May 1982	A Type 21 frigate that was sunk by Argentine bomber aircraft during the Falklands War.	51°39′38″S 59°8′12″W
HMS Coventry	Royal Navy	25 May 1982	A Type 42 destroyer that was sunk by Argentine aircraft during the Falklands War.	51°3′36″S 59°42′12″W
Imo	Norway	30 November 1921	A whaling supply ship known for her involvement in the Halifax Explosion, after which she was repaired and ran aground three years later off East Falkland.	-64.5400782, -61.9983957
ARA Isla de los Estados	Argentine Navy	11 May 1982	A naval supply ship that was sunk by HMS Alacrity during the Falklands War.	51°42′3″S 59°29′22″W
HMS Sheffield	Royal Navy	10 May 1982	A Type 42 destroyer that was sunk by an Exocet missile fired from an Argentine Super Étendard aircraft on 4 May 1982 and foundered while under tow on 10 May 1982 during the Falklands War.	51°33′3″S 59°3′30″W

== Galápagos Islands ==
Ship	Flag	Sunk date	Notes	Coordinates
Ann Alexander	United States	20 August 1851	An American whaleship that sank after it was rammed by a sperm whale.	
Jessica	Ecuador	16 January 2001	An oil tanker that ran aground off Puerto Baquerizo Moreno, causing an oil spill.	

== Peru ==
Ship	Flag	Sunk date	Notes	Coordinates
Adresito		March 1990	Capsized in Amazon River, Iquitos, Loreto Maynas, at least 134 people confirmed dead.	
Covadonga	Chile	13 September 1880	A Chilean schooner that was sunk by a mine outside Chancay.	
La Chachita		May 1991	Capsized by stormy conditions in Marranon River, at least 150 people confirmed dead.	
Santa Elena		March 2008	Capsized in Tepiche River, Loreto, at least fifty people confirmed dead.	

== Uruguay ==
Ship	Flag	Sunk date	Notes	Coordinates
Admiral Graf Spee	Kriegsmarine	17 December 1939	A German cruiser scuttled during the Battle of the River Plate.	34°58′S 56°17′W
HMS Agamemnon	Royal Navy	20 June 1809	A Royal Navy warship ran aground and sank north of Gorriti Island in Maldonado Bay.	34°55′59″S 54°58′52″W

== Venezuela ==
Ship	Flag	Sunk date	Notes	Coordinates
Sesostris	Germany	31 March 1941	A German cargo ship torched by her own crew out of fear of being seized by U.S. or local authorities.	10°29′21″N 67°56′57″W
