= Chilean transporter Casma =

Chilean navy ship

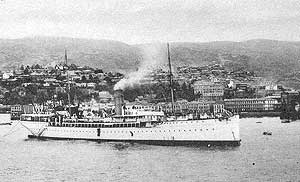
- Transporter Casma

History
- Name: Aquila
- Owner: Fratelli Lavarello fu G. B., Genova
- Builder: Wigham Richardson
- Launched: 1889
- Fate: Sold to Chile (Balmaceda forces) in 1891

Chile
- Name: Casma
- Namesake: Naval battle of Casma
- Acquired: 1891
- Commissioned: 1892
- Fate: Lent to Ecuador in 1905

Ecuador
- Name: Marañón
- Namesake: Marañón River
- Commissioned: 1905
- Decommissioned: 1908
- Fate: Back to Chile

Chile
- Name: Casma
- Commissioned: 1908
- Fate: Sunk in Picton Channel on 2 January 1917

General characteristics
- Displacement: 2,627 t
- Length: 103.5 m
- Beam: 12 m
- Propulsion: 2.750 HP
- Speed: 17 kn

Casma was an auxiliary ship of the Chilean Navy.

== History ==
Casma was bought in Buenos Aires by the Chilean Government of Jose Manuel Balmaceda during the 1891 Chilean Civil War. However, as with the French built armored cruisers Presidente Pinto and Presidente Errázuriz, and the battleship Capitán Prat, they were detained abroad and were not involved in the civil war. It was only after the war ended, in 1892, that the ship was handed over to the Chilean Navy.

In 1905, Casma was lent to the Ecuadorian Navy to be used as a training ship, though in 1908, she was returned to Chile in exchange for the torpedo gunboat Almirante Simpson.

In a 1911 accident, a boat was run over by Casma with the propeller killing all six members of the boat's crew.

=== Final mission ===
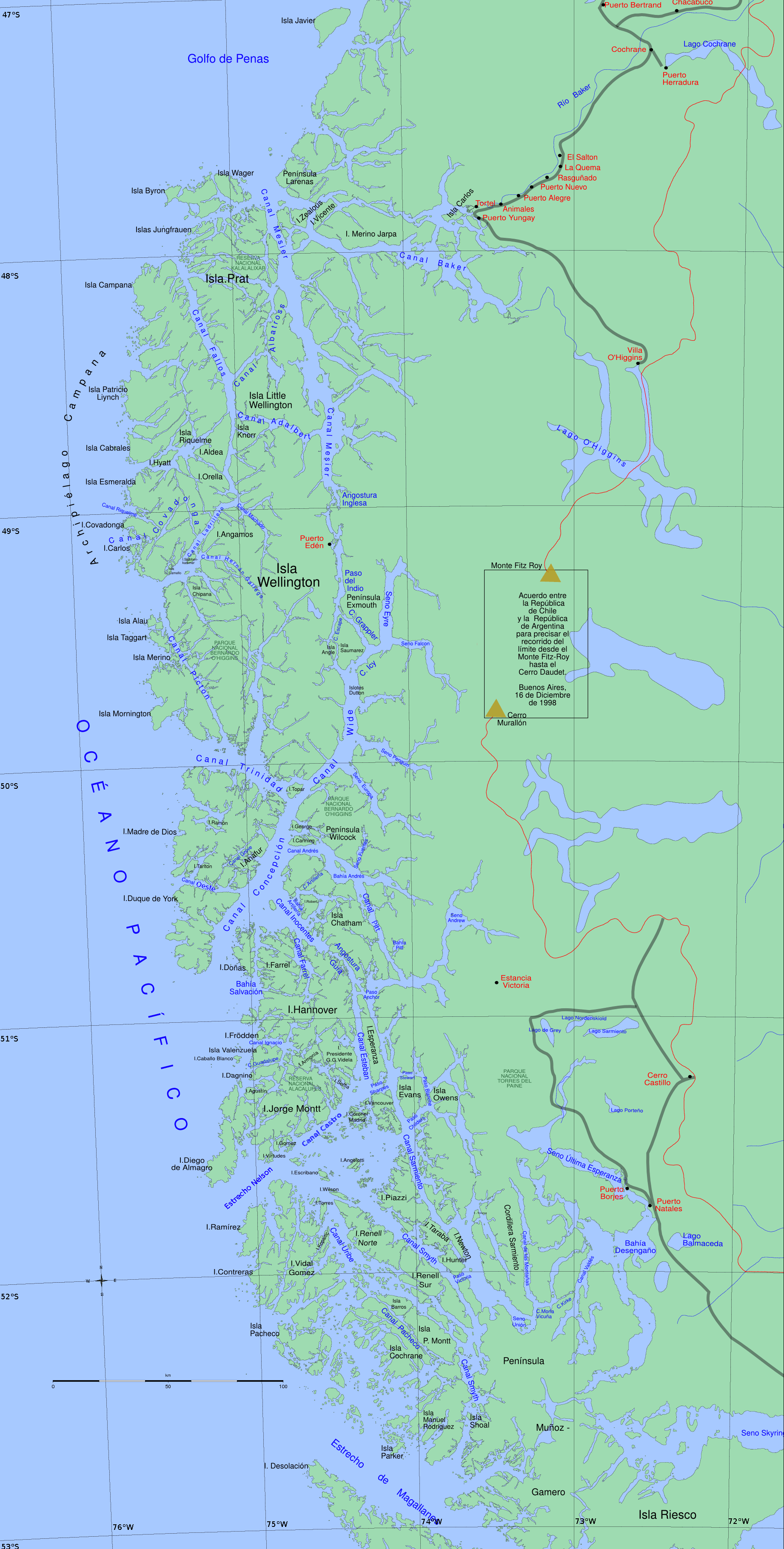
X grounded Casma
O Pepper meets the Steamer Chiloé

In 1916, eight members of the German light cruiser SMS Dresden, four members of the steamship Göttingen and sixteen cadets of the barque Herzogin Cecilie, who were interned on Quiriquina Island for the duration of the war, escaped on board of the cutter Tinto bound for Germany. Francis Stronge, British Minister Plenipotentiary at Santiago, Chile, requested that the Chilean Government attempt to recapture the Germans in fulfillment of Chile's obligations as a neutral country.

On 28 December 1916 the Chilean Navy ordered the Casma to search for the Germans from the Evangelistas Islets to the Gulf of Penas. The Casma crew commenced the search from Punta Arenas under the command of Capitán de Fragata Julio Lagos de la Fuente. Leaving the standard navigation route, the Casma searched by following the route Evangelistas, Nelson Strait, Diego de Almagro Island (then Cambridge Island), Concepción Channel, Trinidad Channel and the Picton Channel.

On 2 January, not far from Golfo Ladrillero, the ship hit a rock and buckled her plates, popping rivets and breaching several compartments. The engine room gradually flooded, impeding the use of the electric generator and, consequently, the radio. The Casma was able to continue for a further 600 m and run aground on a sandy beach, far from the main shipping channel in a sparsely inhabited region.

In order to obtain assistance, and owing to the extreme desolation of these parts and the impossibility of traveling overland, Capitán Lagos sent one of the lifeboats, under the command of Teniente Luis Pepper van Buren, to the main channel. They took with them water, food rations for several days, a compass, chronometer, navigation charts, binoculars, pocket lamp and a flare gun, as well as a rifle and Pepper's service weapon.

Leaving on 3 January, Pepper's party headed for the Sarmiento Channel. On 7 January, in Puerto Bueno, they alerted the steamer Chiloé by firing a Very light. The steamer promptly sailed to the Picton Channel to render help to the crew of the Casma. She was followed to the shipwreck by other rescue vessels - on 10 January the cutters Meteoro and Yáñez, on 13 January the tug Ortiz and on 18 January the cruiser Chacabuco. However, despite three months of effort, the Casma could not be freed and had to be abandoned.

== See also ==
- List of decommissioned ships of the Chilean Navy
