= Diego de Almagro (disambiguation) =

Diego de Almagro (1475–1538) was a Spanish conquistador.

Diego de Almagro may also refer to:

- Diego de Almagro II (1520–1542), de Almagro's son
- Diego de Almagro Island, island in Chile
- Diego de Almagro, Chile, Chilean commune in Chañaral Province, Atacama Region
