= Stosch Island =

Island in Chile

- Location within Chile

Geography
- Coordinates: 49°08′S 75°25′W
- Adjacent to: Pacific Ocean
- Area: 357.3 km^{2} (138.0 sq mi)
- Coastline: 219.1 km (136.14 mi)

Administration
- Chile
- Region: Magallanes
- Province: Última Esperanza
- Commune: Puerto Natales

Additional information
- NGA UFI=-902045

Stosch Island (Spanish: Isla Stosch) is an island located between the Angamos Island (east) and the Covadonga (northwest) and Carlos Islands (west).It belongs to Chile. The Ladrillero Channel runs on the East side. The Golfo Ladrillero is on the South shore of Stosch Island. On the West shore is the Pacific Ocean.

The island is named after German Admiral Albrecht von Stosch.

== See also ==
- List of islands of Chile
