= Pinguino =

Pingüino (in Spanish for "penguin") and pinguino (in Italian) or Pingüinos (Spanish for "penguins") may refer to:

- CVV 1 Pinguino, a 1930s Italian glider
- General Avia F.22 Pinguino, a 1990s civilian airplane
- Penguin Island (South Shetland Islands), Antarctica, also known as Isla Pinguino
- Los Pingüinos Natural Monument, Chile
- Santiago Amador (born 1964), Colombian retired road racing cyclist nicknamed "Pinguino"
- Carlos "Patato" Valdes (1926-2007), Cuban-born American conga player also known as "Pingüino"
- El Pingüino, a 1973 album and track by Johnny Ventura, a Dominican singer and band leader
- El Pingüino (newspaper) - see List of newspapers in Chile
- Hostess CupCake, sold in Mexico as "Pingüinos"
- Pinguino (ship), a cargo ship shipwrecked in 1967 - see List of shipwrecks of South America#Brazil
- ST Pinguino, a tug shipwrecked on 16 September 1927 - List of shipwrecks in 1927
