= Fallos Channel =

Waterway in the Aisen Region of Chile

Coordinates: 48.50°S 75.05°W

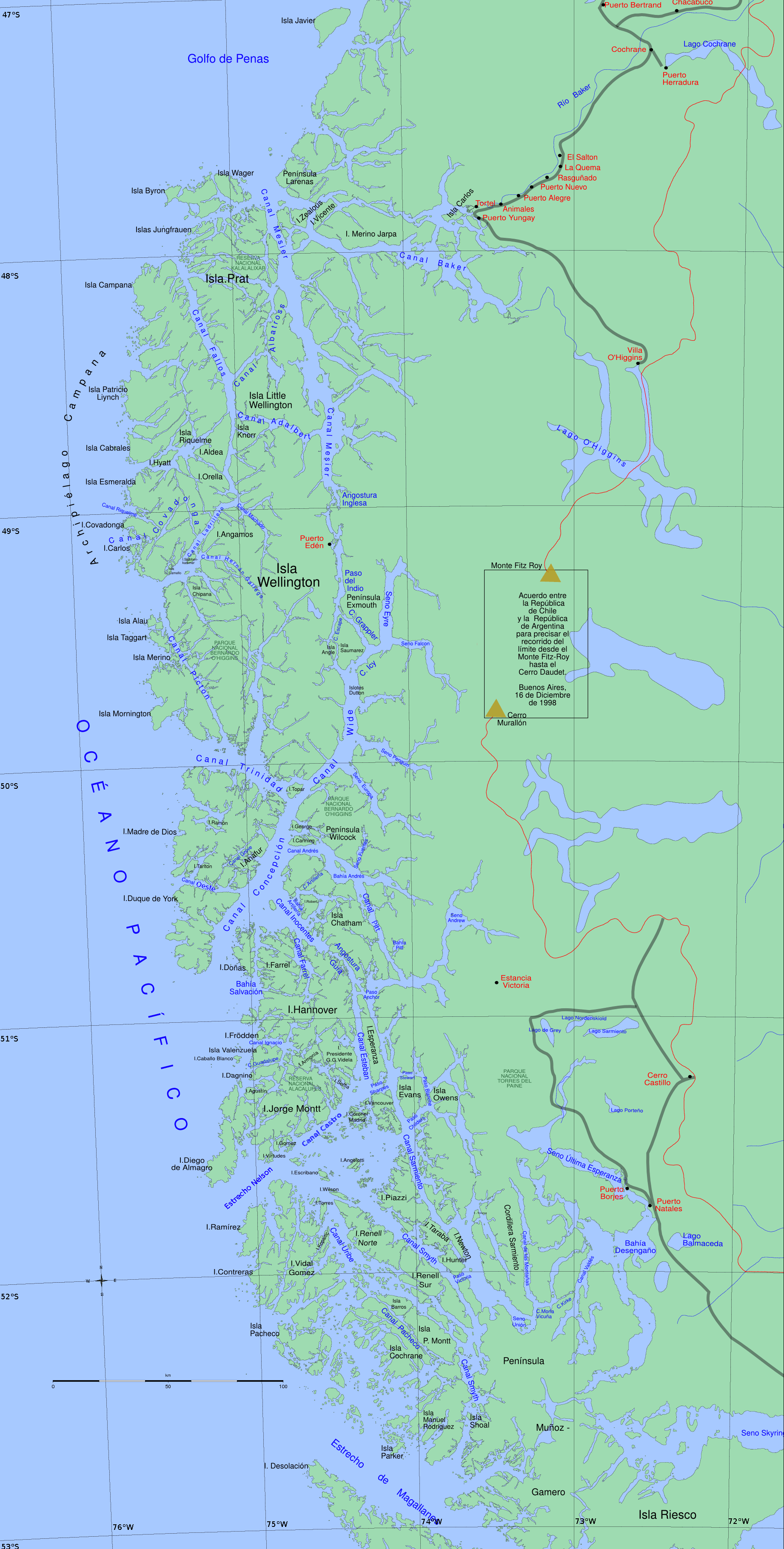
Fallos Channel

Fallos Channel (Spanish: Canal Fallos) is a waterway in the Aisen Region of Chile that runs north of Ladrillero Channel between the Little Wellington Island and Prat Island at the east and Campana Island at the west.

It forms with the Ladrillero and Picton Channel an optional route to the Messier Channel-Grappler Channel-Wide Channel. It has several arms or fiords. It joins the Adalberto Channel and the Castillo Channel, which are at this latitude the borderline between the Aisen Region and the Magallanes Region.

The United States Hydrographic Office, South America Pilot (1916) states:

Fallos Channel has an average breadth of from 1½ to 2 miles, is deep and clear of rocks, and abounds in anchorages for small vessels.
From The Knick, where Ladrillero Channel terminates, Fallos Channel trends in a northerly direction for 65 miles, where it joins the Gulf of Penas. It has the great disadvantage of having no anchorage for large vessels near the entrance from that gulf, in case of meeting a northwest gale.
The esteros of Don Jose, Artigas, Sofia, Corto, and Triple have their mouths in Fallog Channel. They are navigable for any class of ships, but near their heads narrow down so as to make the working of a ship difficult. They are unimportant to navigation, having no practical anchorage. Dona Elvira Bay, in Estero Don Jose, is spacious and perfectly sheltered against the winds, but so deep that it can not be used as an anchorage. The Chilean steamer Toro found no bottom at 40 fathoms in the center of the bay.
Machado Channel branches from Fallos Channeal near The Knick and separates Angamos Island from the continent. It runs in a southerly direction for nearly 30 miles, diminishing in width as it reaches farther south. In its narrow part it is perfectly straight and not difficult to navigate. The five esteros emptying on its east side are unimportant and without anchorage. On the western side of its southern end is Port Abrigado, with excellent anchorage in about 10 fathoms, muddy bottom, and good holding ground.
Preussische Bay is on the western shore of The Knick, and is divided into three arms, named, respectively, Konigs Harbor, Bachem Bay, and Deep Bay. The Albatross steamed up Bachem Bay, which was found obstructed by rocks.

== See also ==
- List of islands of Chile
- List of fjords, channels, sounds and straits of Chile
- List of Antarctic and subantarctic islands
- List of lighthouses and lightvessels in Chile
