= Sarmiento Channel =

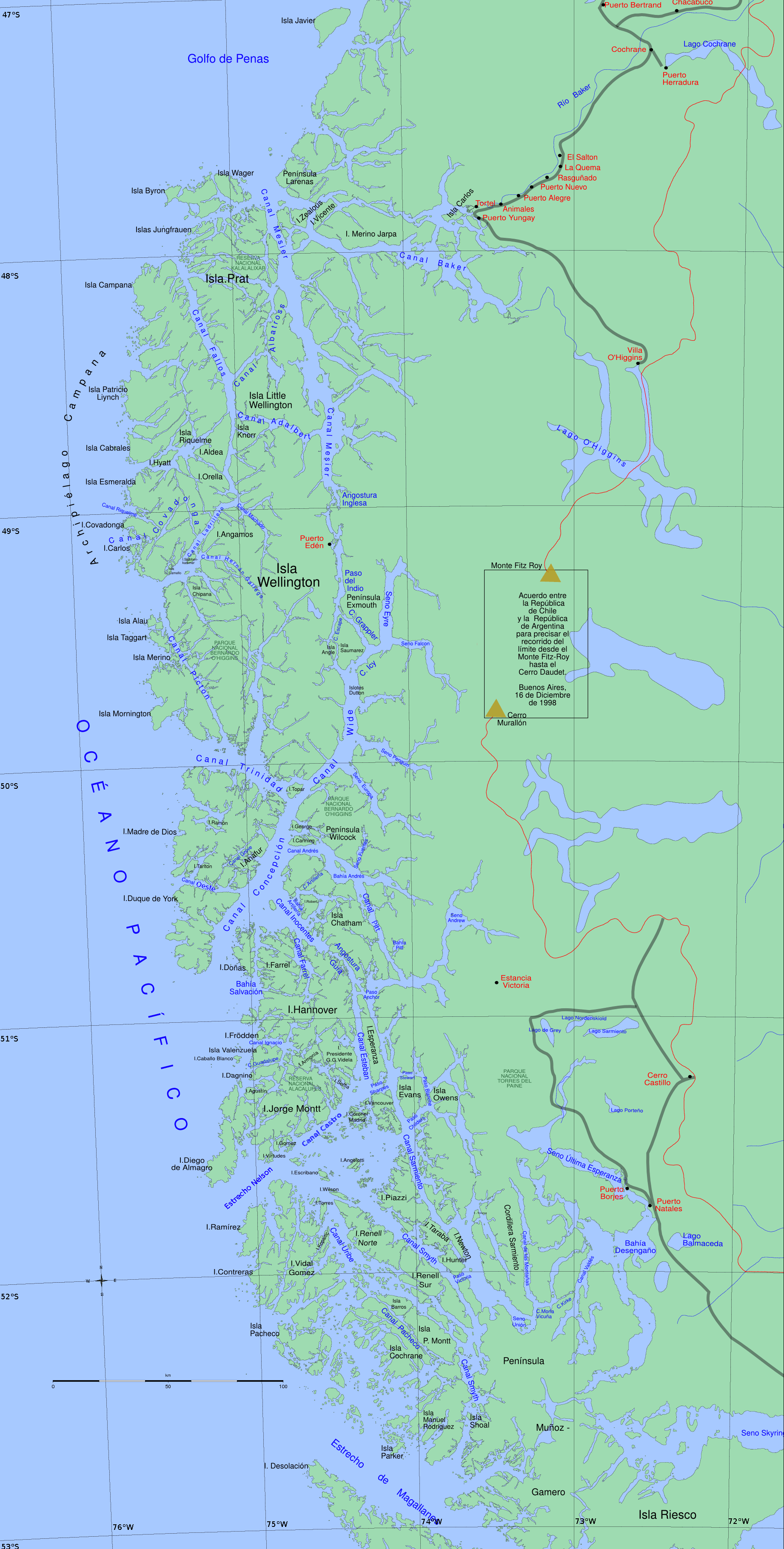
Sarmiento Channel on the east side of Piazzi Island

Sarmiento Channel is a principal Patagonia channel, which extends in a north–south direction. It begins with the Guia Narrows (Angostura Guía) and is located in Magallanes y Antártica Chilena Region. The kawésqar people sailed its waters from around 6,000 years ago until end of 20th century, as they inhabited its coasts.

The channel is named after Pedro Sarmiento de Gamboa, who was a Spanish explorer who navigated the region's waterways between 1579 and 1580.

This elongated water passage begins immediately south of the Guía Narrows at 50°47′00″S 74°25′00″W and terminates at the southern tip of Victoria Pass at 52°02′50″S 73°46′00″W, where it joins to Smyth Channel. During the first 65 nautical miles, it runs in a general south-southeasterly direction, and is flanked by Chile mainland on the east and Esperanza, Vancouver and Piazzi islands on the west. Then it turns abruptly eastward for about 4 nmi, where the channel's name changes to Farquhar Pass. It then resumes its general SSE course, merging with Collingwood Strait for approximately 8 nmi and finishing at Victoria Pass, a 5 nmi long channel that joints it with Smyth Channel.

The islands that border the channel are mountainous with summits that reach 457 m. There is a chain of mountains in the middle of Esperanza Island with elevations between 300 and 1,067 m. To the east of Collingwood Strait, rises the Cordillera Sarmiento, which is a heavily ice- and snow-covered mountain range with majestic glaciers descending to the sea. There are several bays on its coast, which can be used for anchorage of large ships. Along the coast line, some shipwrecks can be observed.

== See also ==
- Fjords and channels of Chile
