= Saumarez Island =

Chilean island

Native name: Isla Saumarez
- Location within Chile

Geography
- Location: Pacific Ocean
- Coordinates: 49°22′00″S 74°22′0″W
- Area: 243 km^{2} (94 sq mi)
- Highest elevation: 256 m (840 ft)

Administration
- Chile
- Region: Magallanes y la Antártica Chilena
- Province: Antártica Chilena

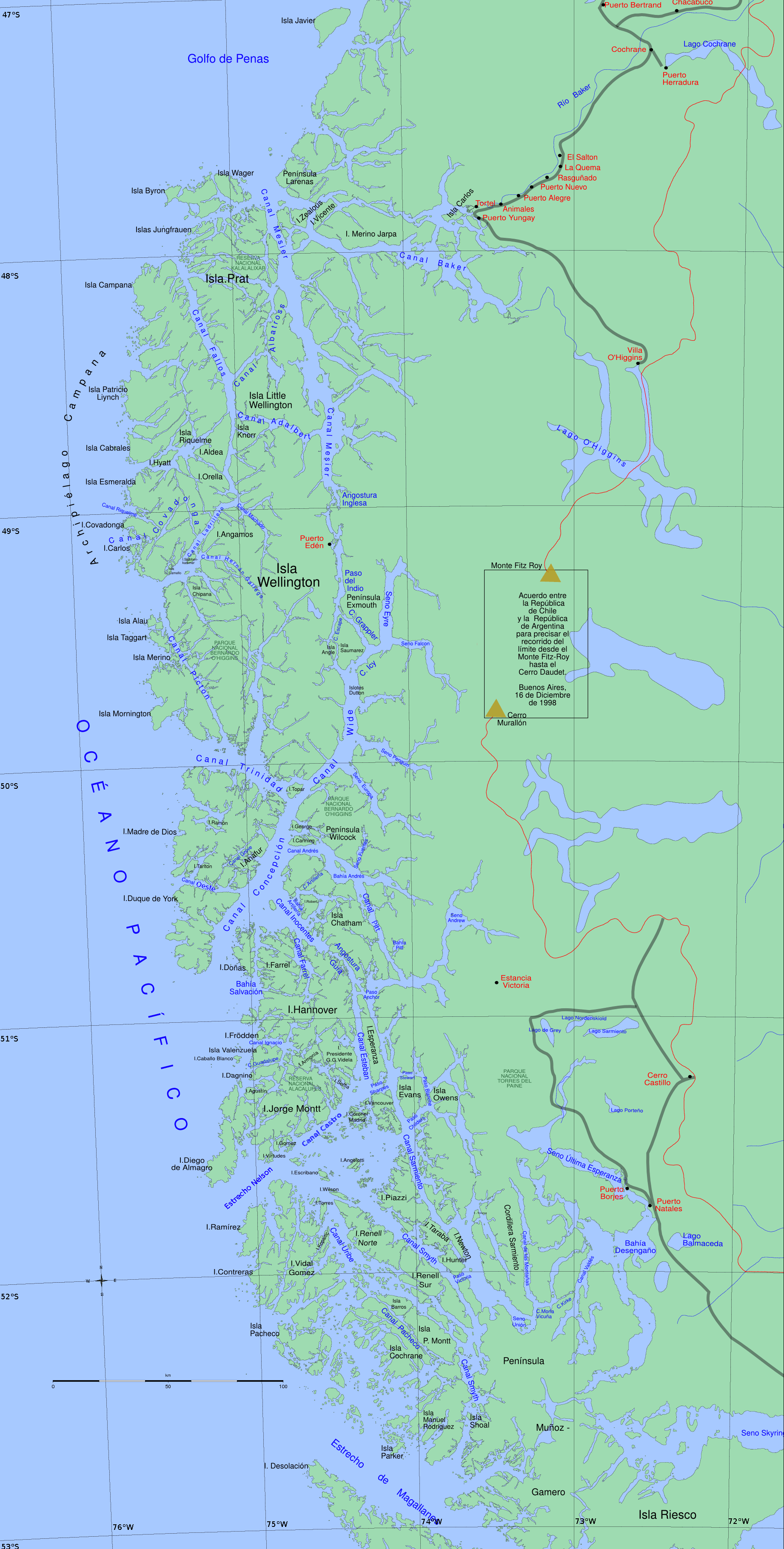
Isla Saumarez in the centre of the map

Saumarez Island (Spanish: Isla Saumarez) is an island within the Bernardo O'Higgins National Park in the Patagonian Archipelago of southern Chile. The island was named after Admiral James Saumarez during the first voyage of HMS Beagle (1826–1830).

Saumarez Island lies in a shipping channel between the archipelago and the mainland that avoids the open Pacific Ocean: shipping can pass southwards via the Messier Channel and the Paso del Indio (Indian Passage), then round Saumarez Island to Wide Channel.
