= Inocentes Channel =

Coordinates: 50.616667°S 74.7°W

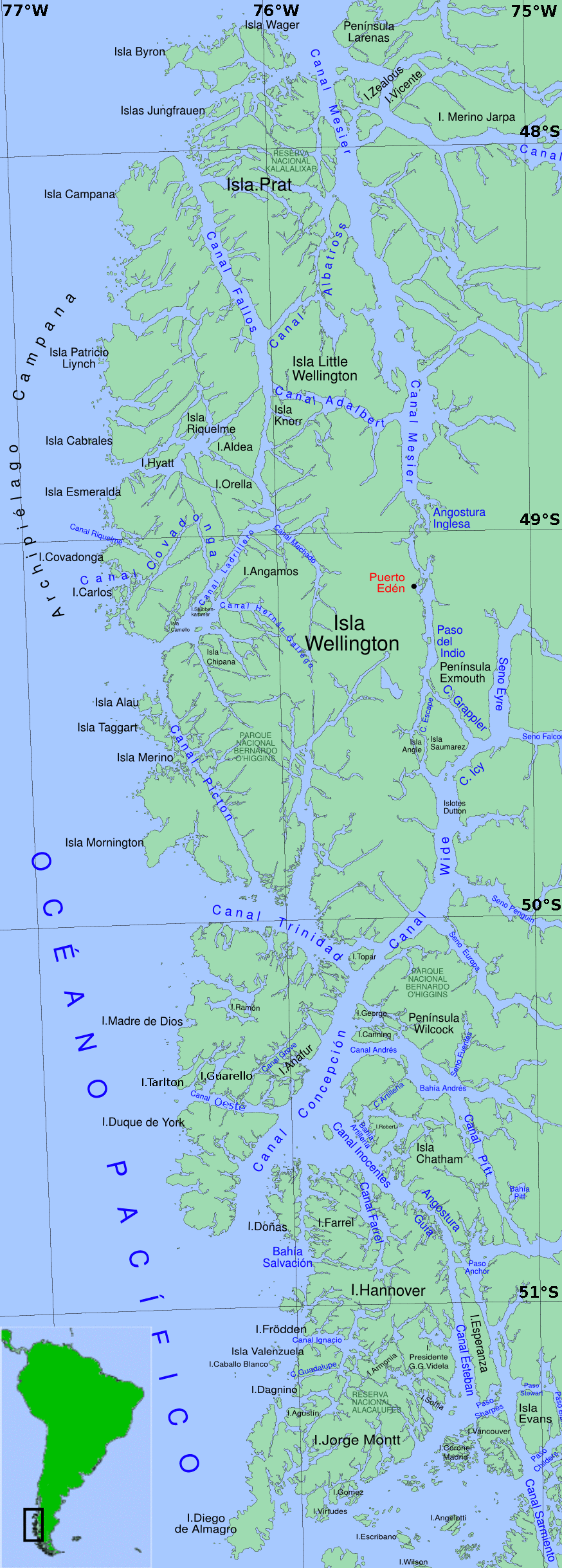
Islands and Bodies of water between Hanover Island and Wellington Island.

Inocentes Channel (Spanish Canal Inocentes) is a strait in Chile that reaches from the Guía Narrows (Angostura Guías) 18 miles to the northern extreme of Inocentes Island, where it joins the Concepción Channel. The south side of the strait is formed by a succession of high cones sloping to the northwest and ending in the Clements Group.

On the north side are three precipitous headlands with deep inlets between them. The land then trends to the northward, and the foreground consists of islands rising to about 400 feet in height.

== See also ==
- Fjords and channels of Chile
