= Concepción Channel =

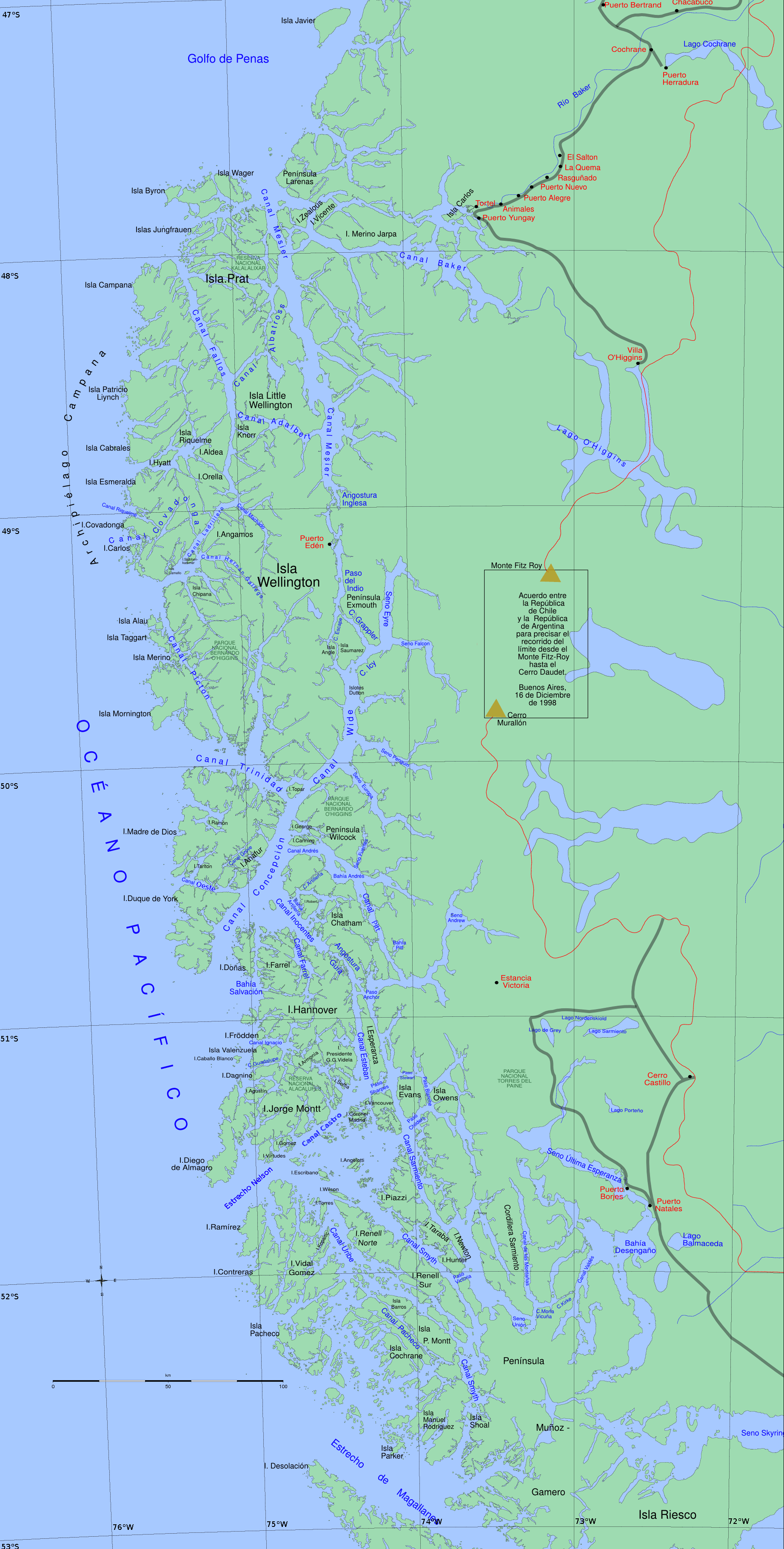
Islands and Bodies of water between Hanover Island and Wellington Island.

Concepción Channel is an inside passage of the Chilean Patagonia. It extends from the point where Wide Channel and Trinidad Channel meet to the open sea. It is located at 50°30′S 74°55′W and separates Madre de Dios Island and Duke of York Island, on the west side, from the Wilcock Peninsula and smaller islands, on the east side. Inocentes Channel is adjacent to the Concepción Channel.

== See also ==
- Fjords and channels of Chile
