= Casma (disambiguation) =

Casma is a town in Peru.

Casma may also refer to:

- Casma Province, province of the Ancash Region of Peru
  - Casma District, district of Casma Province
- Casma River, river that crosses Casma Province in the Ancash Region of Peru
- Casma Valley, coastal valley north of Lima, Peru
- CASMA, Computerized Airline Sales and Marketing Association
- Chilean ship Casma (1889)
