= Juan Ladrillero =

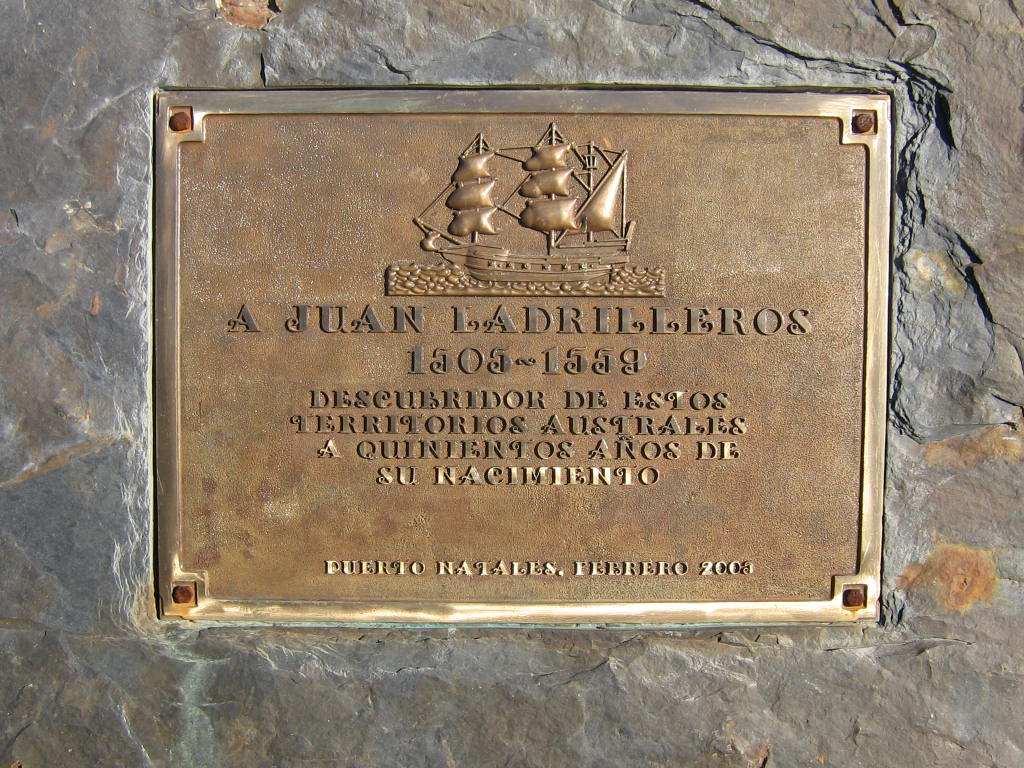
Plaque to Ladrillero: detail

Juan Ladrillero (b. c. 1490 in Moguer – 1574) was a 16th-century Spanish navigator and explorer who from 1557 to 1559 explored the coast of Chile from Valdivia (39° 48’ S) to the Barbara Channel (54° S, between Clarence Island and Santa Ines Island). He was the first to navigate the Strait of Magellan from its western entrance to its eastern and back again.

== Early career ==
Ladrillero went to sea at an early age. In 1535, after having made eleven round voyages from Spain to the West Indies, he received a pilot's license from Sebastian Cabot. He piloted the fleet that brought Don Antonio de Mendoza to Mexico as viceroy, and in 1539-40 commanded a fleet of five sail, with which he discovered the Bahia de la Cruz and helped to found Buenaventura in Colombia. In 1539 he had commanded Hernando Cortés's San Lázaro, carrying various goods from Tehuantepec to Panama. In 1545 he left for Quito, then moved to Lima. He spent several years in retirement on his encomienda in Chuquiago.

== Exploration of southern Chile ==
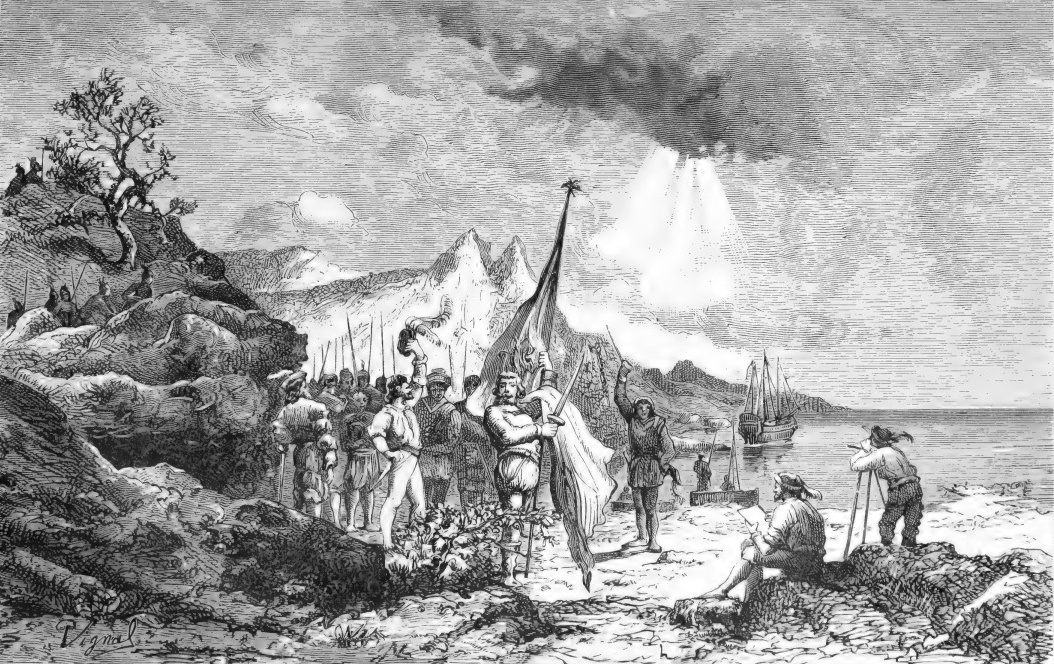
Juan Ladrillero took possession of the Strait of Magellan for the Governorate of Chile and the King of Spain in 1558.

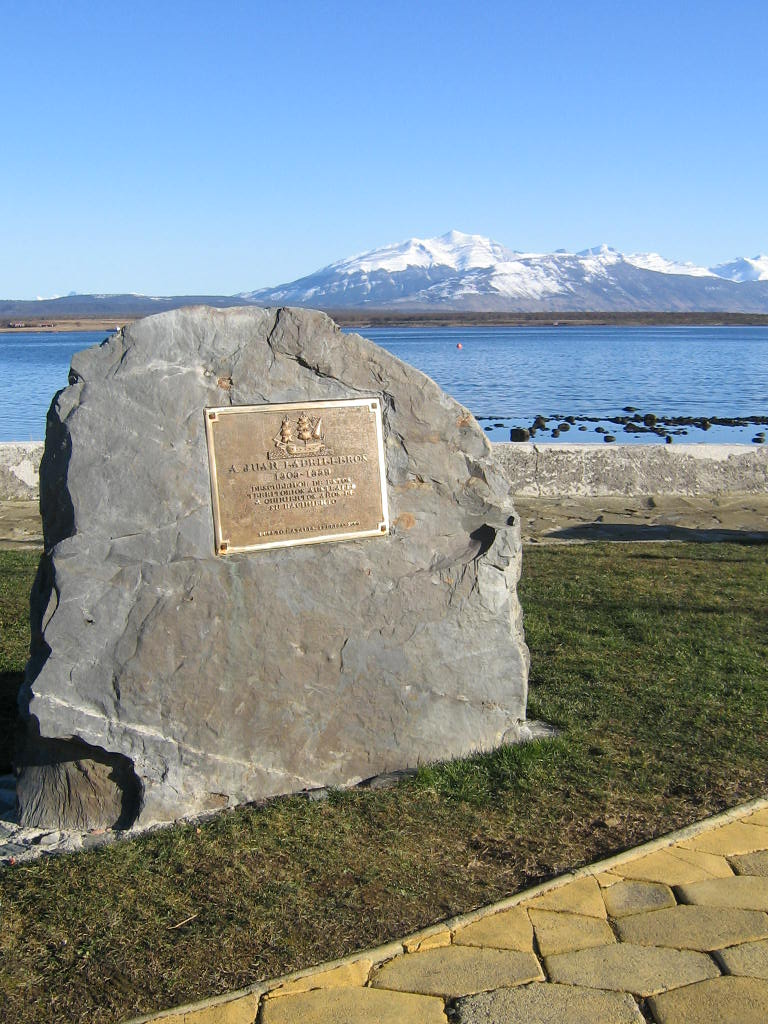
Tribute for Juan Ladrillero, Puerto Natales (Chile).

At end of 1557 the governor general of Chile, Don García Hurtado de Mendoza, placed Ladrillero in command of an expedition "to discover, explore and take formal possession of all the country from Valdivia south, and through the Strait of Magellan." On 17 November, with the ships San Luis and San Sebastián, and the bergantine San Salvador, he sailed from Concepción, Chile. On 9 December, Ladrillero, in the San Luis, was separated from the other two vessels under Francisco de Cortés Hojea—who would explore the Chilean fjords and sounds to the southward independently (by themselves).

Ladrillero spent the month of January 1558 exploring the intricate coastline of southern Chile. After calling at the place he named "Bahia de San Lazáro" (now known as Nelson Strait, at 51° 30’ S) and passing the western entrance of the Strait of Magellan, he sailed along Desolación Island, past Santa Inés Island and entered the Barbara Channel (aka Canal Santa Barbara), which connects to the strait. From 22 March to 22 July he stayed in a harbor he named "Nuestra Señora de los Remedios" and which he locates at around latitude 53° 30’ S; probably the harbor now named Sea Shell.

He probably entered the strait near the end of July; by 9 August he had reached Cape Virgenes. He ventured up several channels, only to find them dead ends. Landing at Punta de San Gregorio, he took formal possession of the region for Spain. Only one of his names from this voyage survives today: Bahia Posesión. He spent less than a day in the South Atlantic before turning back, probably not reaching the western entrance before early March 1559. After a stormy passage, he made Valdivia.

== See also ==
- Antonio de Vea expedition
- Ladrillero Channel
