= Duke of York Island (Chile) =

Island in the Magallanes Region, Chile

- Location within Chile

Geography
- Coordinates: 50.605228°S 75.313902°W
- Adjacent to: Pacific Ocean
- Area: 522 km^{2} (202 sq mi)
- Coastline: 320.8 km (199.34 mi)

Administration
- Chile
- Region: Magallanes

Additional information
- NGA UFI=-879997

Duke of York Island (Chile) (Spanish: Isla Duque de York) is an island in Magallanes Region, Chile.

== See also ==
- List of islands of Chile
