= Ladrillero Channel =

Coordinates: 49.05°S 75.17°W

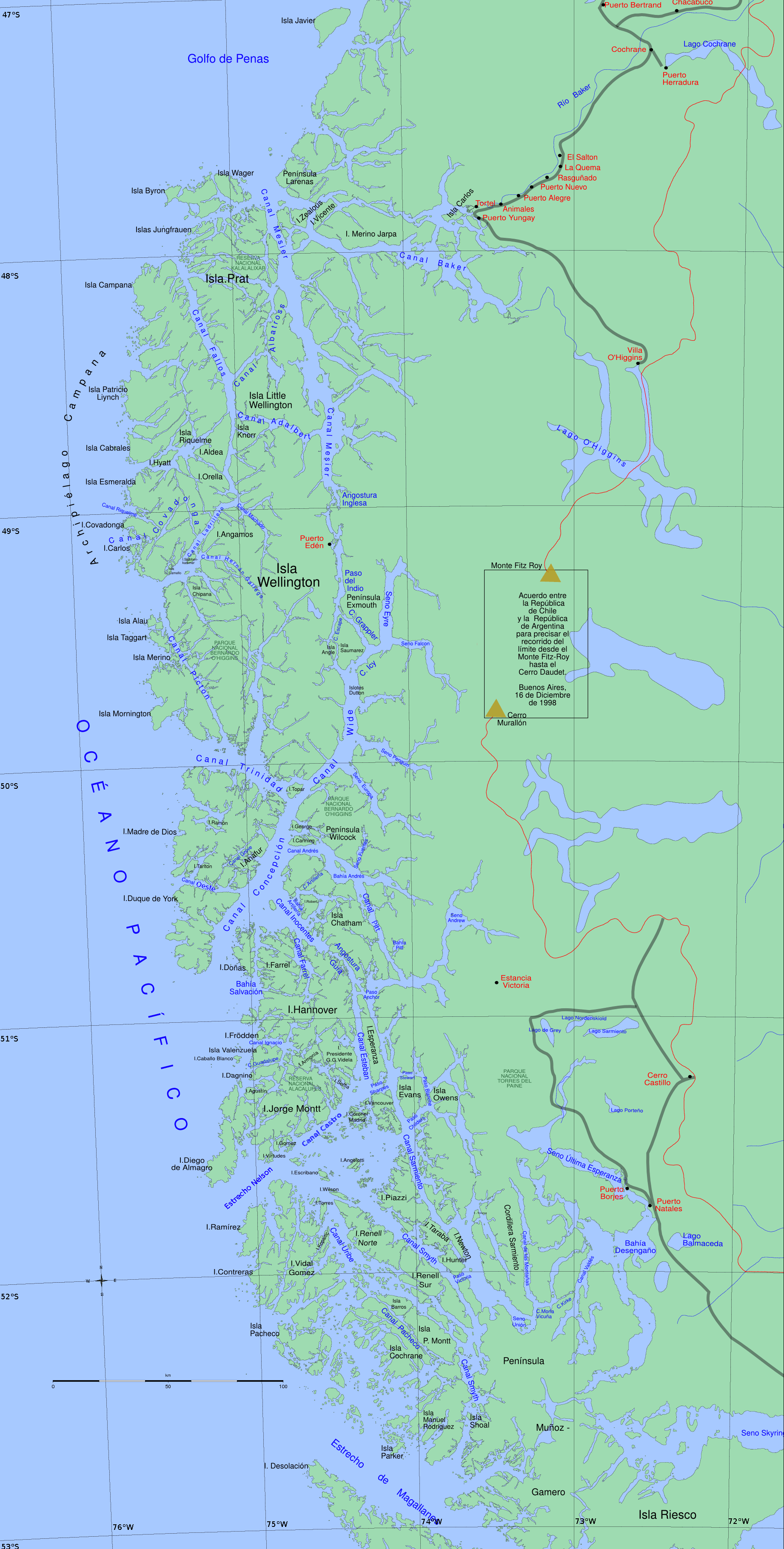
Ladrillero Channel (center left)

The Ladrillero Channel is a strait between Angamos Island and Stosch Island in the Magallanes Region of Chile. It forms, with the Picton Channel and the Fallos Channel, an optional route to the Messier Channel-Grappler Channel-Wide Channel. It has several arms or fiords.

The channel is named after Juan Ladrillero, a Spanish explorer of the southern coast of Chile in the 16th century. In the South America Pilot, it is still called Stosch Channel.

== See also ==
- List of islands of Chile
- List of fjords, channels, sounds and straits of Chile
- List of Antarctic and subantarctic islands
- List of lighthouses and lightvessels in Chile
