= English Narrows =

Coordinates: 48°55′00″S 74°24′30″W

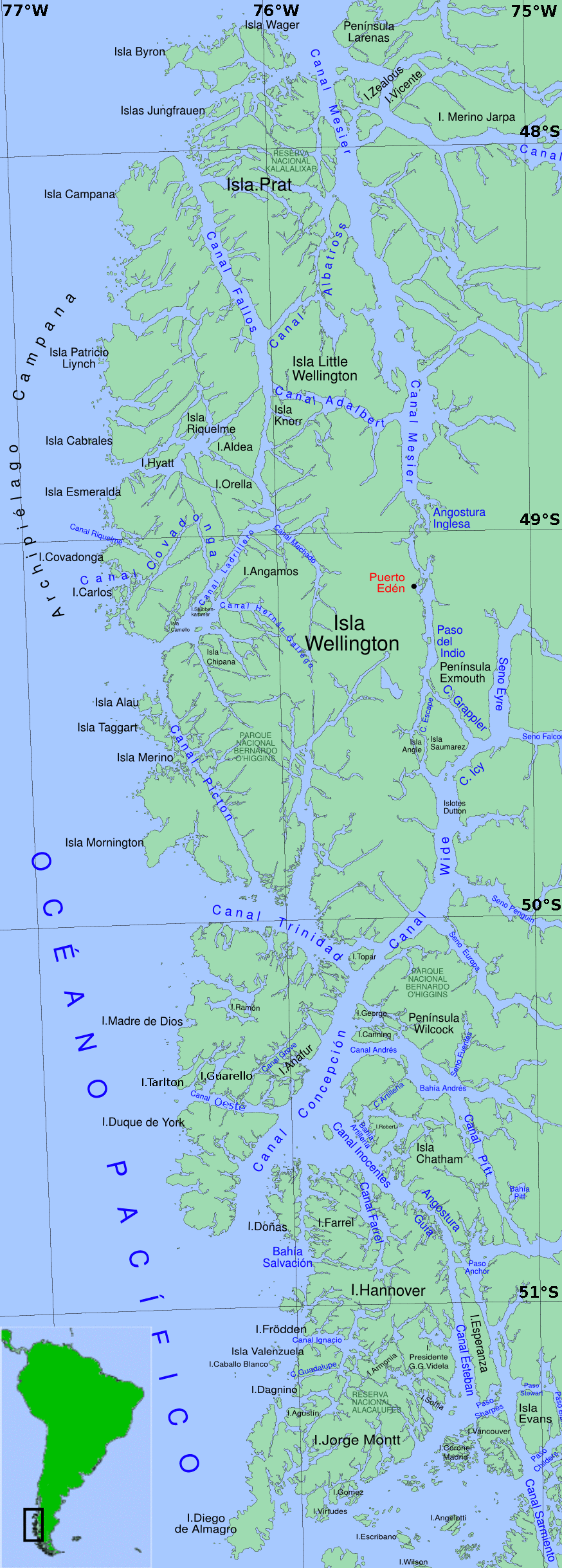

English Narrows (Spanish Angostura Inglesa) “is a contracted passage in Messier Channel in the southwestern coast of Chile. Here it is only 200 yards (180 m) wide, but it presents no great difficulty or danger (excepting to very long vessels) unless a vessel goes through with the wind and tide, which should never be attempted if the wind is strong. In these narrows the tide runs 6 knots (11 km/h; 6.9 mph) at springs.

It is 11 miles (18 km) long, from Isla Moat Island to Paso del Indio.
