= Chatham Island, Chile =

Island in the Magallanes Region, Chile

- Location within Chile

Geography
- Coordinates: 50.682544°S 74.351786°W
- Adjacent to: Pacific Ocean
- Area: 696 km^{2} (269 sq mi)
- Coastline: 355.0 km (220.59 mi)

Administration
- Chile
- Region: Magallanes

Additional information
- NGA UFI=-876684

Chatham Island (Spanish: Isla Chatham) is an island in the Magallanes Region, Chile.

Cape Charles is the southwest point of Chatham Island, and is the most prominent of the many headlands in that vicinity. The cape is high, rugged, and barren.

== See also ==
- List of islands of Chile
