= Diego de Almagro Island =

Island in Chile

Native name: Isla Diego de Almagro
- Location within Pacific Ocean

Geography
- Coordinates: 51°25′S 75°08′W
- Adjacent to: Pacific Ocean
- Area: 376 km^{2} (145 sq mi)
- Coastline: 235.2 km (146.15 mi)

Administration
- Chile
- Region: Magallanes
- Province: Última Esperanza
- Commune: Puerto Natales

Additional information
- NGA UFI=-879670

Diego de Almagro Island (Spanish: Isla Diego de Almagro), formerly known as Cambridge Island, is an island in the Magallanes Region, Chile. It is located South-West of Hanover Island. It is named after Diego de Almagro.

== See also ==
- List of islands of Chile
