= Angamos Island =

Island in Chile

Native name: Isla Angamos
- Location within Chile

Geography
- Coordinates: 49°08′S 75°00′W
- Adjacent to: Pacific Ocean
- Area: 447.7 km^{2} (172.9 sq mi)
- Coastline: 187.7 km (116.63 mi)

Administration
- Chile
- Region: Magallanes and Chilean Antarctica Region
- Province: Última Esperanza
- Commune: Puerto Natales

Additional information
- NGA UFI -872266

Angamos Island (Spanish: Isla Angamos) is an island in the Magallanes and Chilean Antarctica Region, Chile located between Ladrillero, Machado and Hernán Gallego Channels.
