= Hanover Island =

Island in Chile

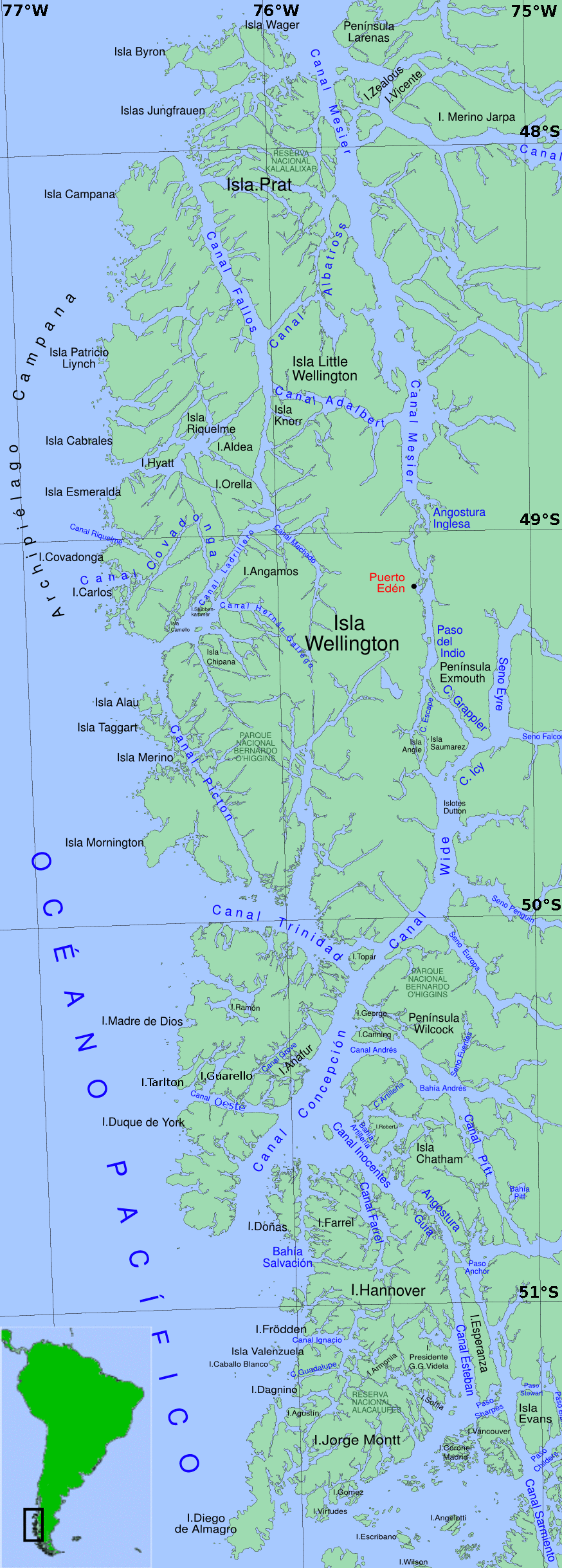
- Hanover Island in Chile

- Location within Chile

Geography
- Coordinates: 51°0′S 74°40′W
- Adjacent to: Pacific Ocean
- Area: 812 km^{2} (314 sq mi)
- Highest point: 1158

Administration
- Chile
- Region: Magallanes

Additional information
- NGA UFI=-884011

Hanover Island (Spanish: Isla Hanover) is an island in the Magallanes Region. It is separated from the Chatham Island by the Esteban Channel, Guías Narrows and Inocentes Channel.

== Literature ==
In popular fiction, a fictionalized version of the island is featured in Jules Verne's book Two Years' Vacation. The book tells the story of 15 boys (aged between 8 and 14) from Auckland, New Zealand, who spent two years on this remote island as a result of a storm, which cast their schooner upon the island's shore. There it is called "Chairman Island" after the name of the boys' boarding school.

The Torres del Paine National Park is located on the continental side.

== See also ==
- List of islands of Chile
