= Serrano Island =

Island in Chile

Native name: Isla Serrano
- Location within Chile

Geography
- Coordinates: 48.532351°S 74.775573°W
- Archipelago: Wellington Archipelago
- Adjacent to: Pacific Ocean
- Area: 1,062.8 km^{2} (410.3 sq mi)
- Coastline: 339.9 km (211.2 mi)

Administration
- Chile
- Region: Aisén
- Province: Capitán Prat
- Commune: Tortel

Additional information
- NGA UFI=-901551

Serrano Island, also known as Little Wellington Island, is an island in the Aisén Region, Chile. It should not be confused with Lavoisier Island in the Antarctica, which is also called Isla Serrano in Spanish.
