= Prat Island =

Island in Chile

Native name: Isla Prat
- Location within Chile

Geography
- Coordinates: 48°15′S 75°0′W
- Adjacent to: Pacific Ocean
- Area: 760.8 km^{2} (293.7 sq mi)
- Coastline: 362.9 km (225.5 mi)

Administration
- Chile
- Region: Aisén
- Province: Capitán Prat

Additional information
- NGA UFI=-897241

Prat Island is an island in the Patagonian Archipelago, Chile. Its area is 762 km^{2}.

== See also ==
- List of islands of Chile
