= Wide Channel =

Inside passage of the Chilean Patagonia

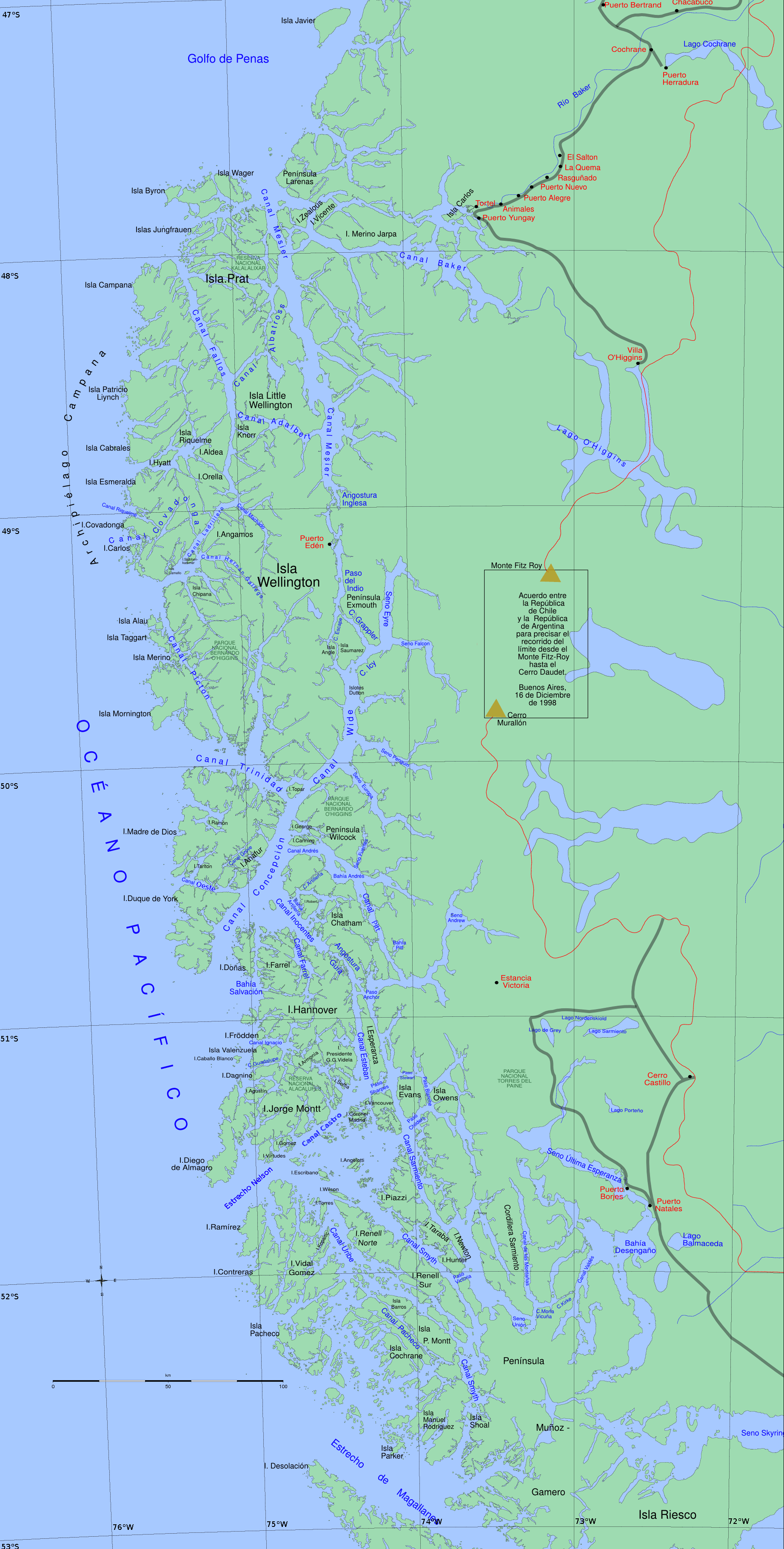
Islands and Bodies of water between Golfo de Penas and the Straits of Magellan

Wide Channel is an inside passage of the Chilean Patagonia. It is 38 miles (61 km) long, extending northward from the junction of Concepción Channel and Trinidad Channel, to Saumarez Island. The channel is located at 49°54′S 74°23′W.

Wide Channel is flanked by precipitous mountains. The fjords Europa and Penguin open into this channel.

== See also ==
- List of fjords, channels, sounds and straits of Chile
