= Fjords and channels of Chile =

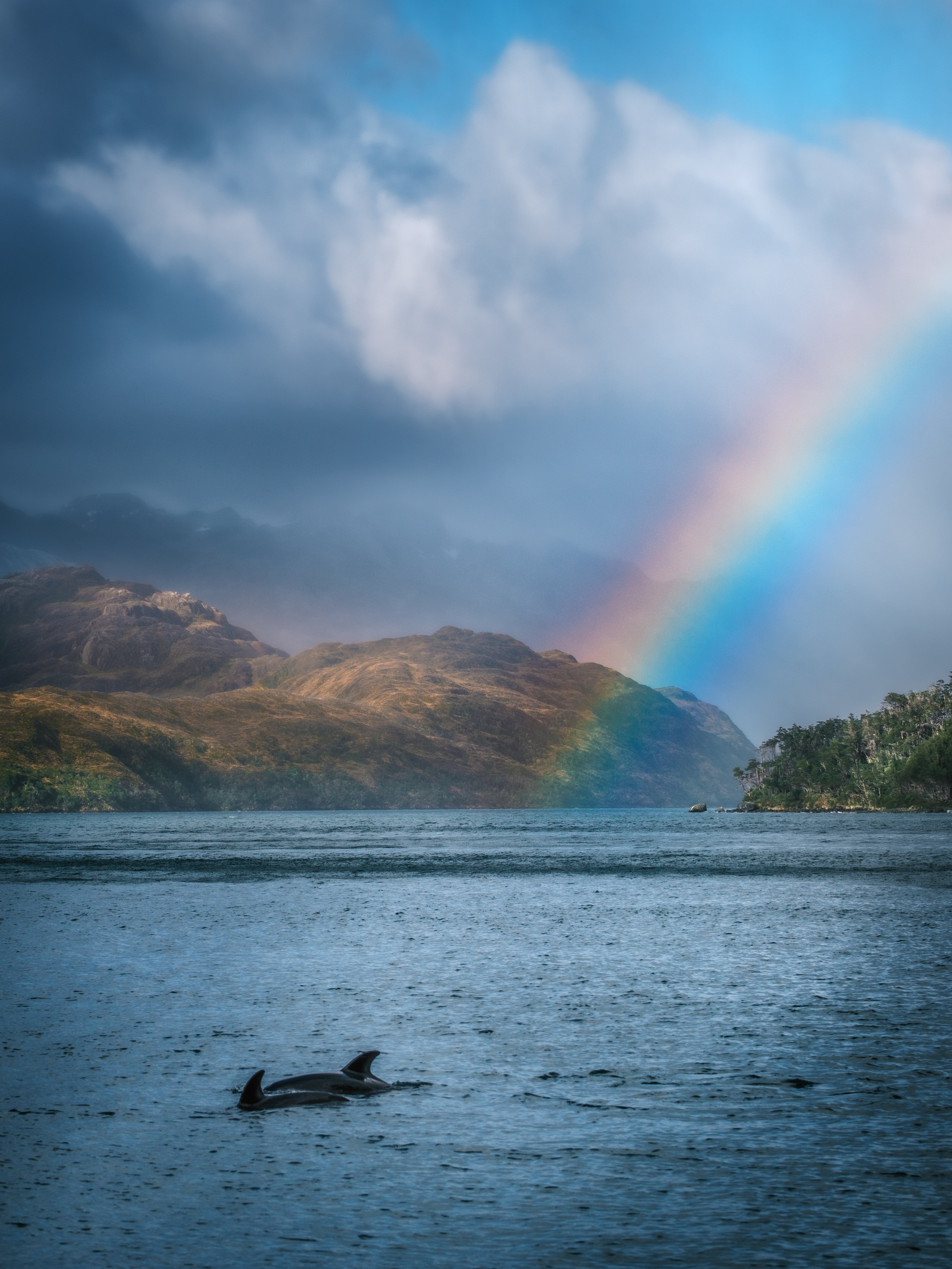
A photograph taken from a boat in the fjords

The southern coast of Chile presents a large number of fjords and fjord-like channels from the latitudes of Cape Horn (55° S) to Reloncaví Estuary (42° S). Some fjords and channels are important navigable channels providing access to ports like Punta Arenas, Puerto Chacabuco, and Puerto Natales.

== History ==
=== Indigenous peoples ===
The earliest known inhabitants of the fjords and channels of Chile were, from north to south, the Chono, Alacalufe, and Yaghan, all of whom shared a life style as canoe-faring hunter-gatherers. They also shared physical traits such as being of low stature, long-headed (Dolichocephalic), and having a "low face". Despite similarities their languages were completely different. The Chono moved around in the area from Chiloé Archipelago to 50° S and the Alacalufe from 46° S to the Strait of Magellan. Thus both groups overlapped in Gulf of Penas, Guayaneco Archipelago and other islands. Yaghans inhabited a reduced area south of Tierra del Fuego.

It is often assumed that Chonos were the people who left behind most of the abundant Pre-Historic shell middens (chonchales) of Chiloé Archipelago, yet this claim is unverified. Guaitecas Archipelago made up the southern limit of Pre-Hispanic agriculture as noted by the mention of the cultivation of potatoes by a Spanish expedition in 1557.

Both Chonos and Alacalufes used Pilgerodendron uviferum as firewood as well as wood for rows, boats, and houses.

=== Colonial expeditions and decline of the Chono ===
Pedro de Valdivia sought originally to conquer all of southern South America to the Straits of Magellan (53° S). He did however only reach Reloncaví Sound (41°45' S). Later in 1567 Chiloé Archipelago (42°30' S) was conquered, from there on southern expansion of the Spanish Empire halted. The Spanish are thought to have lacked incentives for further conquests south. The indigenous populations were scarce and had ways of life that differed from the sedentary agricultural life the Spanish were accustomed to. The harsh climate in the fjords and channels of Patagonia may also have deterred further expansion. Indeed, even in Chiloé did the Spanish encounter difficulties to adapt as their attempts to base the economy on gold extraction and a "hispanic-mediterranean" agricultural model failed.

During colonial times, the fjords and channels of Patagonia were first explored by the Spaniards. There were a number of motivations for their explorations, including a desire to Christianize indigenous peoples, to prevent intrusions of foreign powers into territory claimed by Spain, to increase geographic knowledge of the zone, and finally, to search for a mythical city called City of the Caesars. False rumors of European settlements near the Straits of Magellan led the Spanish to organize the Antonio de Vea expedition of 1675–1676, the largest expedition to the date. In 1792, the viceroy of Peru ordered the exploration of the Patagonian channels in order to find an entrance to the interior of Patagonia. The said order was carried of by José de Moraleda who led an expedition that visited many of the main channels of the zone.

Following the decline of the Chono populations in the archipelago in the 18th century, the area gained a reputation of "emptiness" among Chileans akin to the description of eastern Patagonia as a "desert." However, the islands were often visited and traversed in the 19th century by fishermen, lumberjacks, and hunters from Chiloé. This makes it clear that many areas that were traversed by explorers were already known to the inhabitants of southern Chiloé who visited these areas for wood, fish or hunting.

Over-all the physical infrastructure of the Spanish in the fjords and channels during the colonial period was negligible and consisted of a few chapels built in the 1610s and 1620s and a wooden fortress built in 1750. All these buildings were abandoned after a few years.

=== 19th century: Explorations and first settlements ===
==== Chilean and European exploration ====
In the early to mid 19th century, explorations by hydrographers like Robert FitzRoy and Francisco Hudson increased knowledge on the channels. With Hudson's death in 1859 Francisco Vidal Gormaz continued the explorations, a duty that Enrique Simpson assumed in the 1870s. The channels south of the Isthmus of Ofqui were explored in detail by Chilean government agent Hans Steffen in the late 19th century.

During his explorations and charting in the second half of the 19th century Vidal Gormaz became critical of the work of Robert FitzRoy and Charles Darwin whom according to him had failed acknowledge the importance of the Patagonian islands.

==== Pilgerodendron boom ====
Felipe Westhoff, a German-Lithuanian immigrant who operated a Pilgerodendron uviferum logging business from Ancud, founded Melinka in Guaitecas Archipelago in 1860. This was the first permanent settlement in the archipelago. Chilean authorities granted Westhoff exclusive rights on Pilgerodendron extraction in the archipelago and bestowed him the title of subdelegado marítimo which gave him some duties and authority over the archipelago, in reality it meant little since he did not have the means to enforce the law or his rights. After Westhoff's retirement in the 1870s Ciriaco Álvarez rose to prominence as the foremost Pilgerodendron businessman. The chief export products of Álvarez were poles and vine training stacks that went to northern Chile and Peru. Álvarez business owned him the nickname of "The King of Pilgerodendron" (Spanish: El Rey del Ciprés) and had great effects on the incipient economic development that came to link the archipelagoes of Chiloé, Guaitecas and Chonos.

== Climate and geography ==
It is very rare for the fjords to freeze in winter but when it happens it is usually in the inner parts of fjords whose surface waters are mainly freshwater.

Navigating through the fjords and channels of Chile is mostly done by vessels desiring to avoid the heavy seas and bad weather so often experienced on passing into the Pacific Ocean from the western end of the Strait of Magellan. The large full-powered mail steamers generally at once gain the open sea at Cape Pillar (at the west entrance of the Strait of Magellan), as experience has shown that time is thus saved to them; but vessels of less engine power, to which punctuality and dispatch is not so much an object as avoiding possible danger, will find the Patagonian Channels the best route.

The general features of these channels are high, abrupt shores, with innumerable peaks and headlands remarkably alike in character, their bold, rugged heads giving an appearance of gloomy grandeur rarely seen elsewhere. The shores are generally steep-to and the channels, for the most part, open and free, while the few dangers that exist are usually marked by kelp. The tides are regular and not strong, except in the English Narrows.

In the case of the two above mentioned and some other fjords, these waterways proved of value as transport lanes when western Patagonia was settled and incorporated into Chile. On the other hand, the fjords have served as a natural barrier preventing north–south land travel in Chilean Patagonia.

Overview of Channels in South Chile: North to right and South to left side

== Legal status of the waterways ==
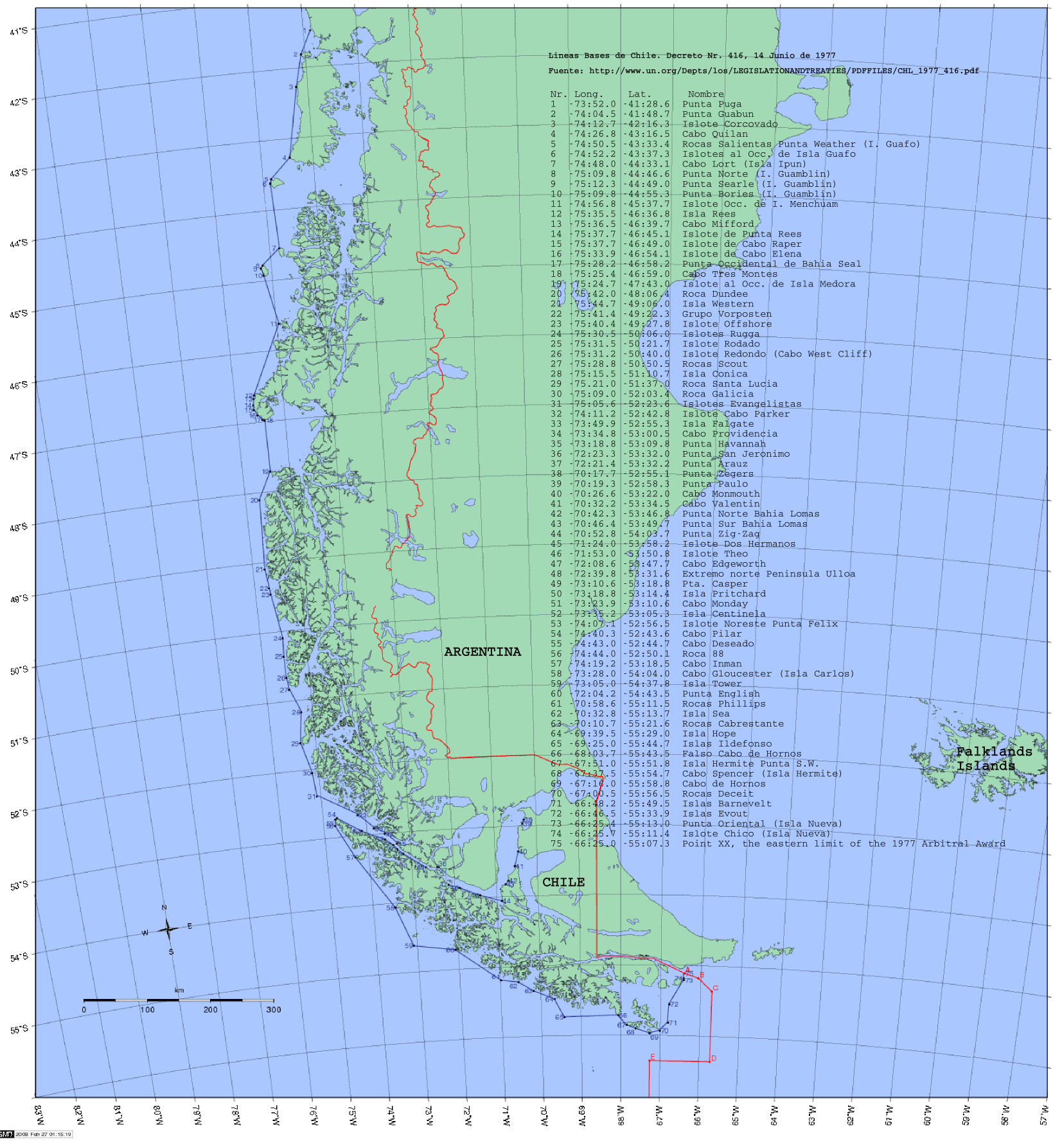
The baselines of Chile, according to decree 416, define the internal waters of the Republic

All waters between the Chilean baselines and the continental shoreline are internal waters, according to the Chilean decree 416 of 14 June 1977 based in the United Nations Convention on the Law of the Sea, that is, the coastal nation is free to set laws, regulate any use, and use any resource. Foreign vessels have no right of passage within internal waters, and this lack of right to innocent passage is the key difference between internal waters and territorial waters. Chile allows the use of the main waterways under maritime authority dispositions for the following navigation lanes (all names in Spanish):

a) throughout the Strait of Magellan:

Punta Dúngenes - Primera Angostura - Segunda Angostura, Paso Nuevo -Paso Inglés - Paso Tortuoso - Paso Largo - Paso del Mar - Cabo Pilar (and back).

b) from Cabo Tamar to isla San Pedro :

Cabo Tamar - Canal Smyth - Canal Mayne or Canal Gray - Paso Victoria - Estrecho Collingwood - Paso Farquhar - Canal Sarmiento - Angostura Guías - Canal Inocentes - Canal Concepción - Paso Caffin - Canal Trinidad - either Pacific Ocean, (and back) or to continue Canal Wide - either (east route) Canal Icy - Canal Grappler or (west route) Canal Escape - Paso del Abismo or Paso Piloto Pardo - Canal Escape; then Paso del Indio - Angostura Inglesa - Canal Messier to Isla San Pedro, (and back) or from Cabo Ladrillero to Canal Concepción to inner channels (and back)

c) From Strait of Magellan to Puerto Natales or Puerto Bories:

from Isla Brinkley - Seno Unión - Canal Morla Vicuña - Canal y angostura Kirke - Canal Valdés, Golfo Almirante Montt - Canal Señoret - Seno Última Esperanza - Puerto Natales - Puerto Bories (and back)

d) from Strait of Magellan to Puerto Williams:

from islote Anxious - Canal Magdalena - Canal Cockburn - Paso Brecknock or Canal Ocasión - Canal Unión - Paso Occidental - Paso Norte - Canal Ballenero- Canal O'Brien - Paso Timbales - Brazo noroeste del Canal Beagle - Canal Beagle - Puerto Williams (and back).(Chilean ships can use Paso Aguirre)

e) from Puerto Williams to Cabo de Hornos:

Canal Beagle - Paso Picton - Paso Richmond - to Cabo de Hornos (and back)

f) to the east Beagle Channel:

Ships coming from east can access through the eastern mouth, northeast of Isla Nueva or through the Pasos Richmond and Picton.

g) to Seno Otway and Seno Skyring:

from Isla Carlos III - Canal Jerónimo - Seno Otway - Canal Fitz-Roy - Seno Skyring to Bahía Mina Elena (and back).

h) to Isla Guarello:

from Isla Inocentes - Canal Concepción - Canal Oeste - Seno Contreras - Bahía Corbeta Papudo in Isla Guarello, (and back), or from Bahía Corbeta Papudo in Isla Guarello - Seno Contreras - Paso Metalero (and back).

i) throughout Chonos Archipelago:

- from isla Inchemó - Bahía Anna Pink - Boca Wickham - Canal Pulluche - Canal Chacabuco - Canal Errázuriz - Canal Moraleda until Gulf of Corcovado and Boca del Guafo (and back) or
- from isla Inchemó - Bahía Anna Pink - Boca Wickham - Canal Pulluche - Canal Utarupa - Canal Darwin -Canal Moraleda to Gulf of Corcovado and Boca del Guafo (and back) or
- from isla Auchilú, - Bahía Darwin - Canal Darwin - Canal Moraleda to Gulf of Corcovado and Boca del Guafo (and back) or
- from Bahía Adventure - Isla Liebre - Canal Niñualac - Canal Moraleda to Gulf of Corcovado and Boca del Guafo (and back).

j) to bahía Chacabuco:

from Canal Moraleda - Paso del Medio or Canal Pilcomayo or Canal Ferronave - Seno Aysén to Bahía Chacabuco (and back).

k) to Laguna San Rafael:

- from Canal Moraleda - Paso Casma - Canal Costa - Estero Elefante - Paso Quesahuén - Golfo Elefantes and Río Témpanos - Laguna San Rafael (and back) or
- from Canal Moraleda - Canal Errázuriz - Paso Tres Cruces - Estero Elefantes - Paso Quesahuén - Golfo Elefantes and Río Témpanos - Laguna San Rafael (and back).

l) through the inner channels of Chiloé:

from Boca del Guafo or Golfo Corcovado to Puerto Montt or to Golfo de Coronados, (and back) throughout the inner Channels heading to ports and bays

m) to Puerto Montt through Canal de Chacao:

from golfo Coronados - Canal de Chacao - Golfo de Ancud - Canal Calbuco or Paso Queullín - Seno de Reloncaví - Paso Guar - Puerto Montt (and back).

== Transportation ==
Since it is impossible to reach all the region by road through Chile, the transport of persons and cargo must be done by ship or airplanes according to the public infrastructure provision.

=== Ferry lanes ===
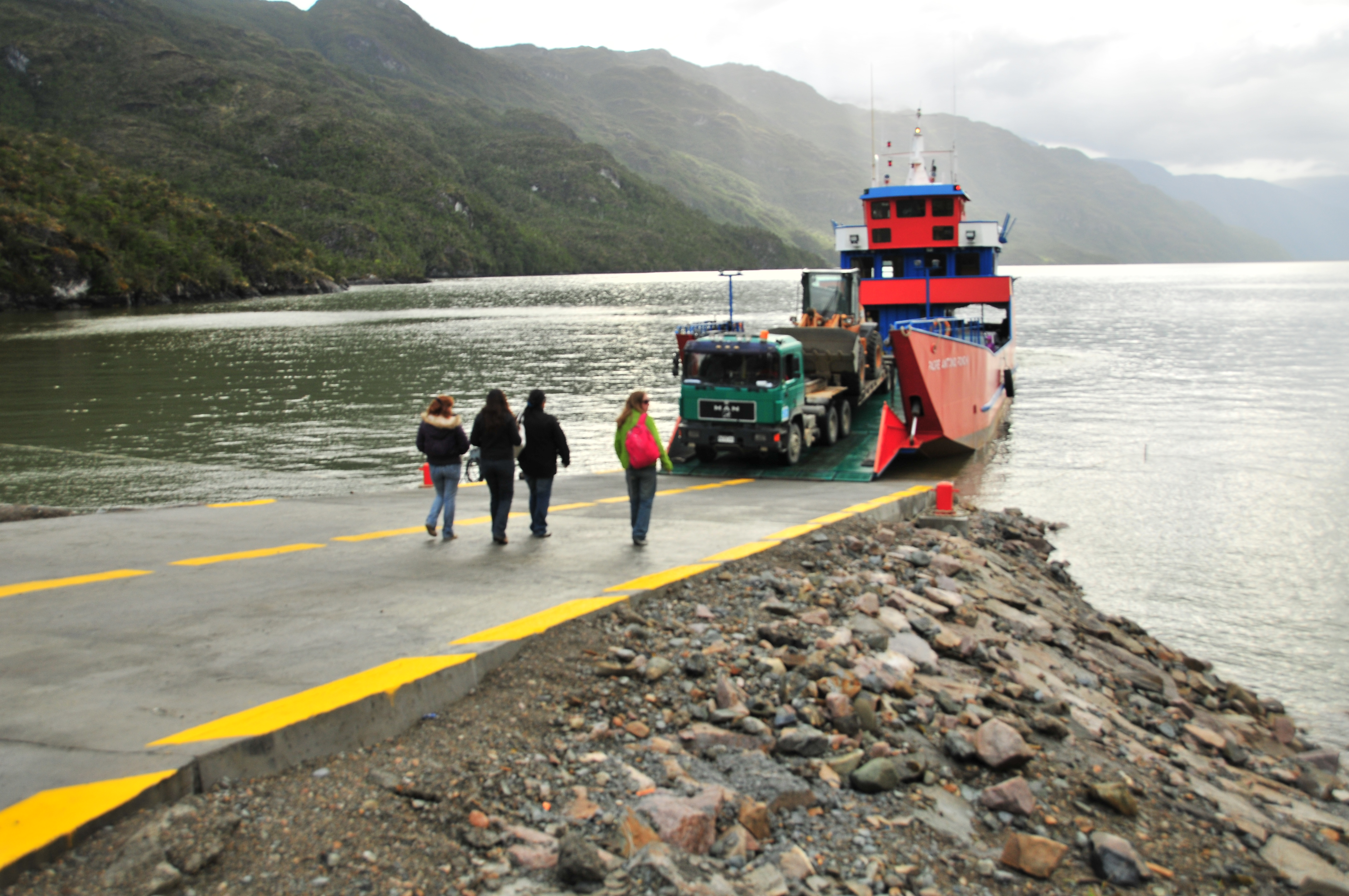
Channels, fjords and straits are important waterways for the region, as here in Mitchell Fjord, near Villa O'Higgins

In order to carry significant quantities of persons, vehicles, and cargo directly onto an unimproved shore to supply the islands and coastal region including settlements, the ferry is the best suited ship type and most of them are basically a cargo boat with no fancy, cruiser-type accommodation, even though they have managed to improve their customer service. There are 150 major ships sailing in the southern regions of Chile.

Cruise ships also operate between the main ports of the region and offer a journey that is considered an experience in itself, due to the slow way of entering this landscape of narrow channels and solitary islands.

The Carretera Austral requires the use of three ferries: a 30-minute crossing about 45 kilometers (28 mi) south of the start of the highway in Puerto Montt, a 5-hour crossing from Hornopirén (110 kilometers (68 mi) south of Puerto Montt) to Caleta Gonzalo and a 50-minute crossing from Puerto Yungay to Rio Bravo, connecting to the final 100 kilometers (62 mi) of the highway.

With the exception of Chiloé Island, the region is sparsely inhabited. The main ports are: Puerto Montt, Quellón, Chaitén, Melinka, Puerto Chacabuco, Puyuguapi, Puerto Natales, Punta Arenas, Porvenir and Puerto Williams.

South of Chiloé, there are also small ports like Villa Puerto Edén, Bahía Corbeta Papudo on Guarello Island, Puerto Bories, Puerto Navarino, Puerto Toro, and Caleta Eugenia.

=== The Isthmus of Ofqui canal project ===
The Negro River flows from near the San Rafael Laguna to the San Esteban Gulf

In order to open a direct passage from the Moraleda Channel to the Messier Channel without to go out into the open Pacific Ocean to round the Taitao Peninsula, the Chilean Government ordered in 1937 the construction of a canal from the San Rafael Lagoon through the isthmus (2,200 m long, 17 m wide, 5 m depth) to the Negro River, that later should be dredged 25 kilometres (16 mi). 1937 began the work on the ground, under the management of the railways department of the Ministry of Public Works. Work continued until May 1943 when funds ran out. The map on the right shows the Laguna San Rafael and the Golfo Elefantes, they are the southernmost part of the Moraleda Channel. The Golfo San Esteban can be seen as the northernmost part of the Messier Channel.

=== Chacao Channel bridge ===
The Chacao Channel bridge, also known as Chiloé Bicentennial Bridge, is a planned bridge that is to link the island of Chiloé with mainland Chile crossing the Chacao Channel. It was one of the several projects that were planned to commemorate the Chile's bicentennial in 2010. If completed as a suspension bridge, it would be the largest such bridge in South America.

== Main fjords and channels ==
=== Chacao to Guafo ===
Fjords and channels of Los Lagos Region. Click to enlarge.

- Chacao Channel

Access to the Sea of Chiloé and Reloncaví Sound
Settlements: Chacao

- Calbuco Channel

Access to
Settlements:

- Comau Fjord

Access to
Settlements:

- Dalcahue Channel

Access to
Settlements:

- Hornopirén Channel

Access to Hornopirén area
Settlements: Hornopirén

- Piti Palena Fjord

Access to
Settlements: Raúl Marin

- Apiao Channel

Access to
Settlements:

- Paso Desertores

Access to
Settlements:

- Reloncaví Estuary

Access to Puelo River, Todos los Santos Lake and Vuriloche Pass
Settlements: Canutillar, Cochamó

- Reñihué Fjord

Access to Carretera Austral
Settlements: Caleta Gonzalo

=== Guaitecas to the Gulf of Penas ===
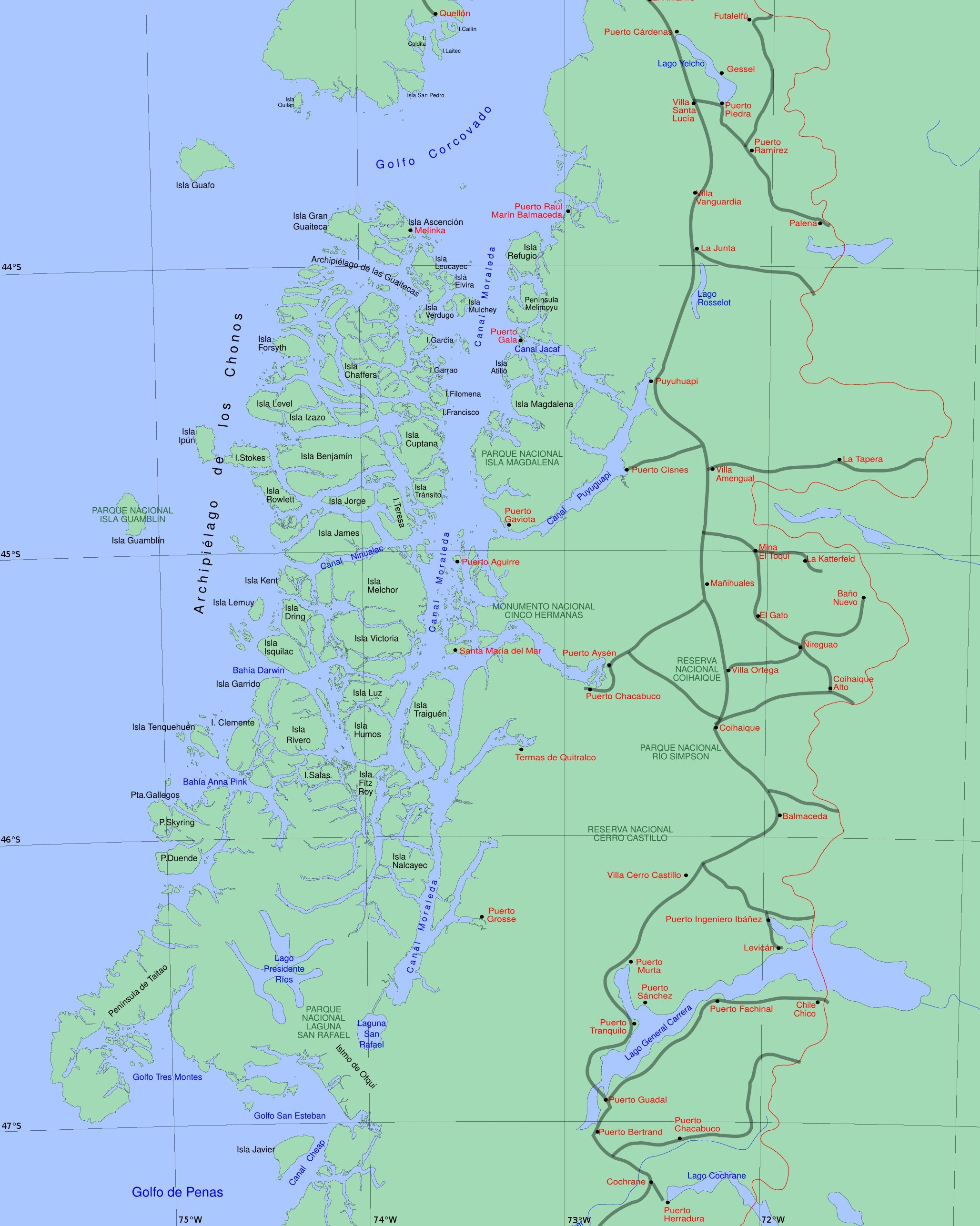
Fjords and channels of Aysén Region. Click to enlarge.

- Aysén Fjord

Access to Coyhaique area
Settlements: Puerto Chacabuco

- Baker Channel

Access to Baker and Pascua River area
Settlements: Caleta Tortel

- Estero Capquelan

Access to
Settlements:

- Mitchell Fjord

Access to Villa O'Higgins and O'Higgins Lake
Settlements: Puerto Yungay

- Darwin Channel (not to be confused with Darwin Sound)

Access to
Settlements:

- Moraleda Channel

Access to northern Aysén Region
Settlements:

- Puyuhuapi Channel

Access to Villa La Tapera
Settlements: Puerto Cisnes

- Ventisquero Sound

Access to
Settlements:

=== Gulf of Penas to Straits of Magellan ===
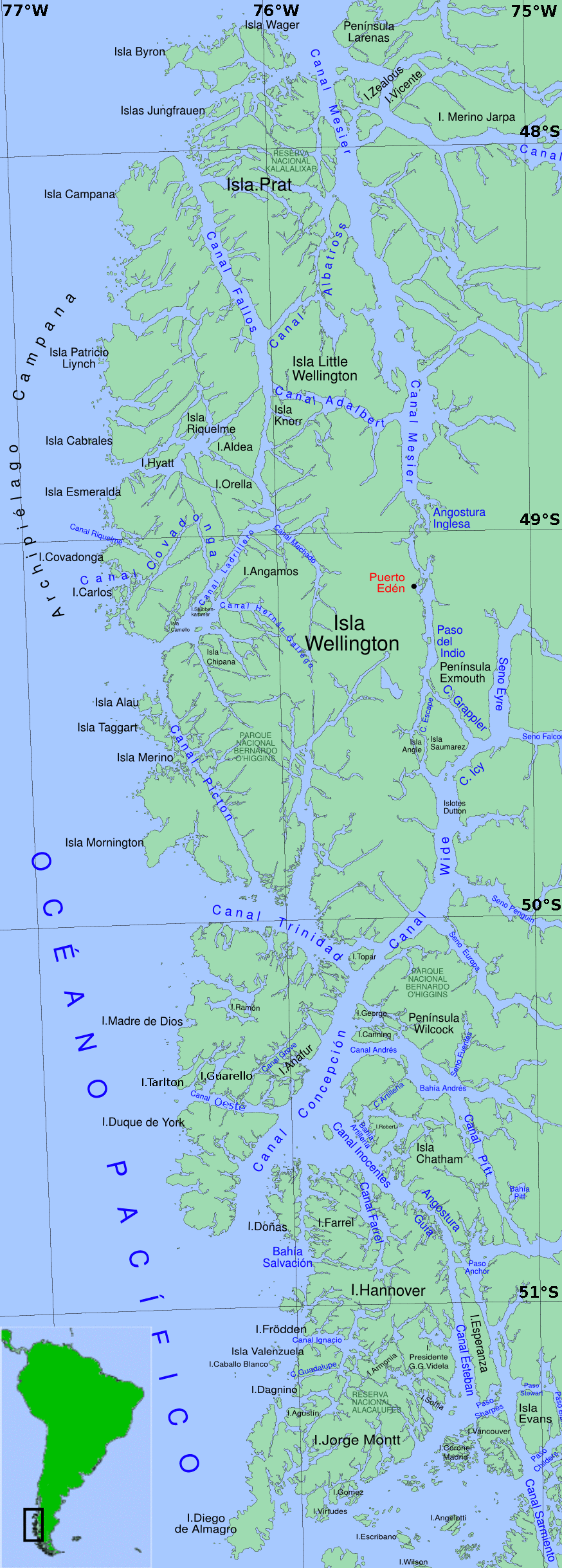
Fjords and channels of northern Magallanes y la Antártica Chilena Region. Click to enlarge.

- Messier Channel
  - English Narrows
  - Guía Narrows

Safe sea-lane from Central Chile to Punta Arenas, Puerto Natales and Tierra del Fuego
Settlements: Villa Puerto Edén

- Concepción Channel

Access to
Settlements:

- Wide Channel

Access to
Settlements:

- Inocentes Channel

Access to
Settlements:

- Sarmiento Channel

Safe sea-lane from Central Chile to Punta Arenas, Puerto Natales and Tierra del Fuego
Settlements:

- Señoret Channel

Access to
Settlements:

- Peel Fjord

Access to
Settlements:

- Eyre Fjord

Access to
Settlements:

- Fallos Channel

Access to
Settlements:

- Trinidad Channel

Access to
Settlements:

- Ladrillero Channel

Access to
Settlements:

- Picton Channel

Access to
Settlements:

- Covadonga Channel

Access to
Settlements:

- Albatros Channel

Access to
Settlements:

- Adalbert Channel

Access to
Settlements:

- Esteban Channel

Access to
Settlements:

=== Tierra del Fuego and Puerto Natales ===
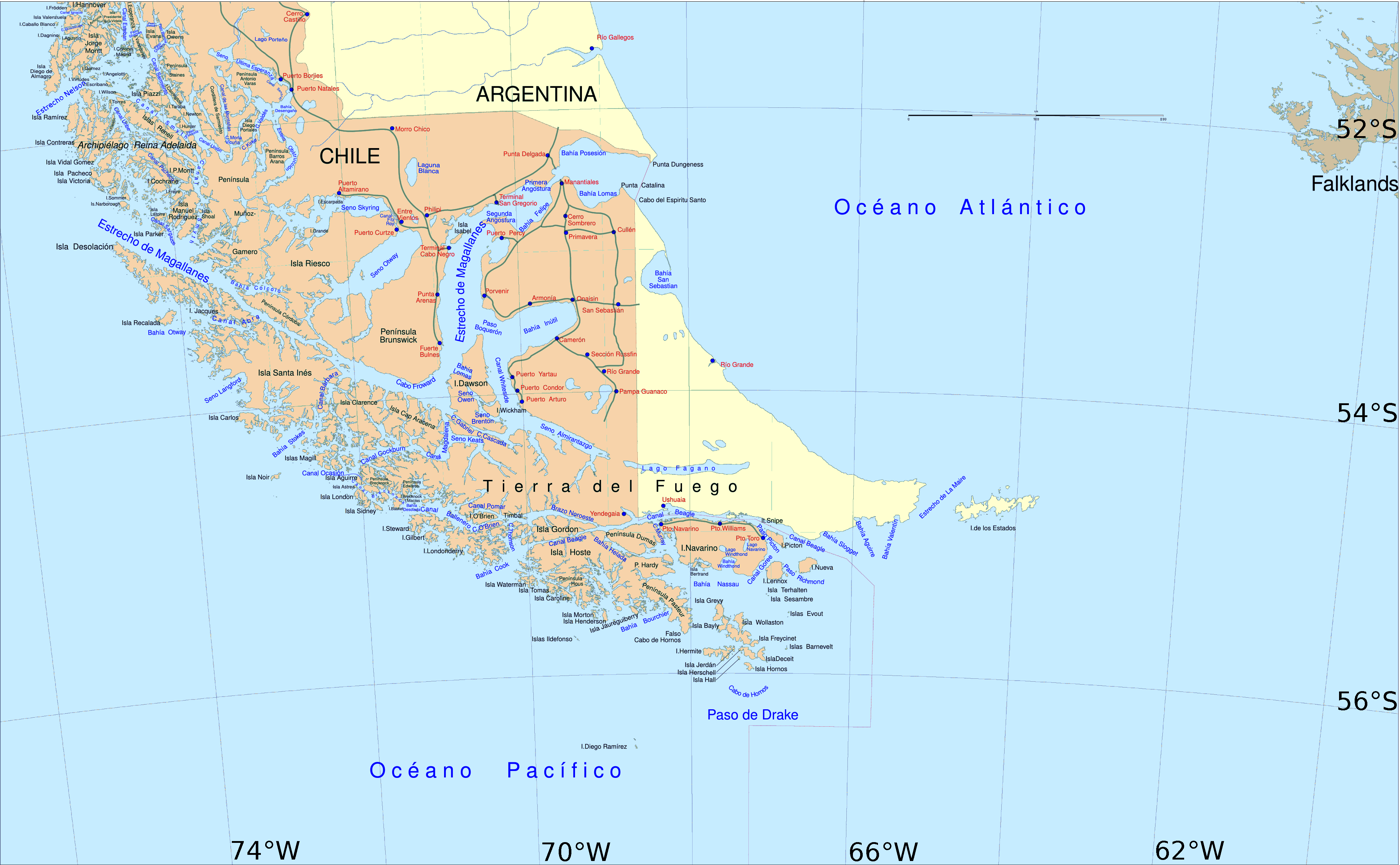
Fjords and channels of southern Magallanes y la Antártica Chilena Region. Click to enlarge.
- Nelson Strait (Chile)

Access to
Settlements:

- Fjord of the Mountains

Access to
Settlements:

- Smyth Channel

Safe sea-lane from Central Chile to Punta Arenas, Puerto Natales and Tierra del Fuego
Settlements:

- Seno Última Esperanza

Access to
Settlements:

- Eberhard Fjord

Access to
Settlements:

- Agostini Fjord

Access to
Settlements:

- Almirantazgo Fjord

Access to Cami Lake in Tierra del Fuego
Settlements:

- Canal Whiteside

Access to
Settlements:

- Inútil Bay

Access to
Settlements:

- Seno Otway

Access to
Settlements:

- Seno Skyring

Access to
Settlements:

- Beagle Channel

Safe sea-lane between the South Atlantic and the South Pacific
Settlements: Puerto Navarino, Puerto Williams, Puerto Toro.

- Darwin Sound (not to be confused with Darwin Channel)

Access to Beagle Channel from the Pacific and the Strait of Magellan
Settlements:

- Abra Channel

Access to the Strait of Magellan from Pacific Ocean
Settlements:

- Magdalena Channel

Access to the Strait of Magellan from Pacific Ocean
Settlements:

- Cockburn Channel

Access to the Strait of Magellan from Pacific Ocean, route from Beagle Channel to Strait of Magellan
Settlements:

- Ballenero Channel

Route from Beagle Channel to Strait of Magellan
Settlements:

- Strait of Magellan
  - Punta Dúngenes
  - Bahia Possession
  - Primera Angostura
  - Segunda Angostura
  - Cape Froward
  - Evangelistas Lighthouse

Safe sea-lane between the South Atlantic and the South Pacific
Settlements: Porvenir, Punta Arenas, Camerón

- Murray Channel

Connects Beagle Channel with Cape Horn through Bahía Nassau
Puerto Navarino

- Pitt Channel

Access to
Settlements:

== Gallery ==
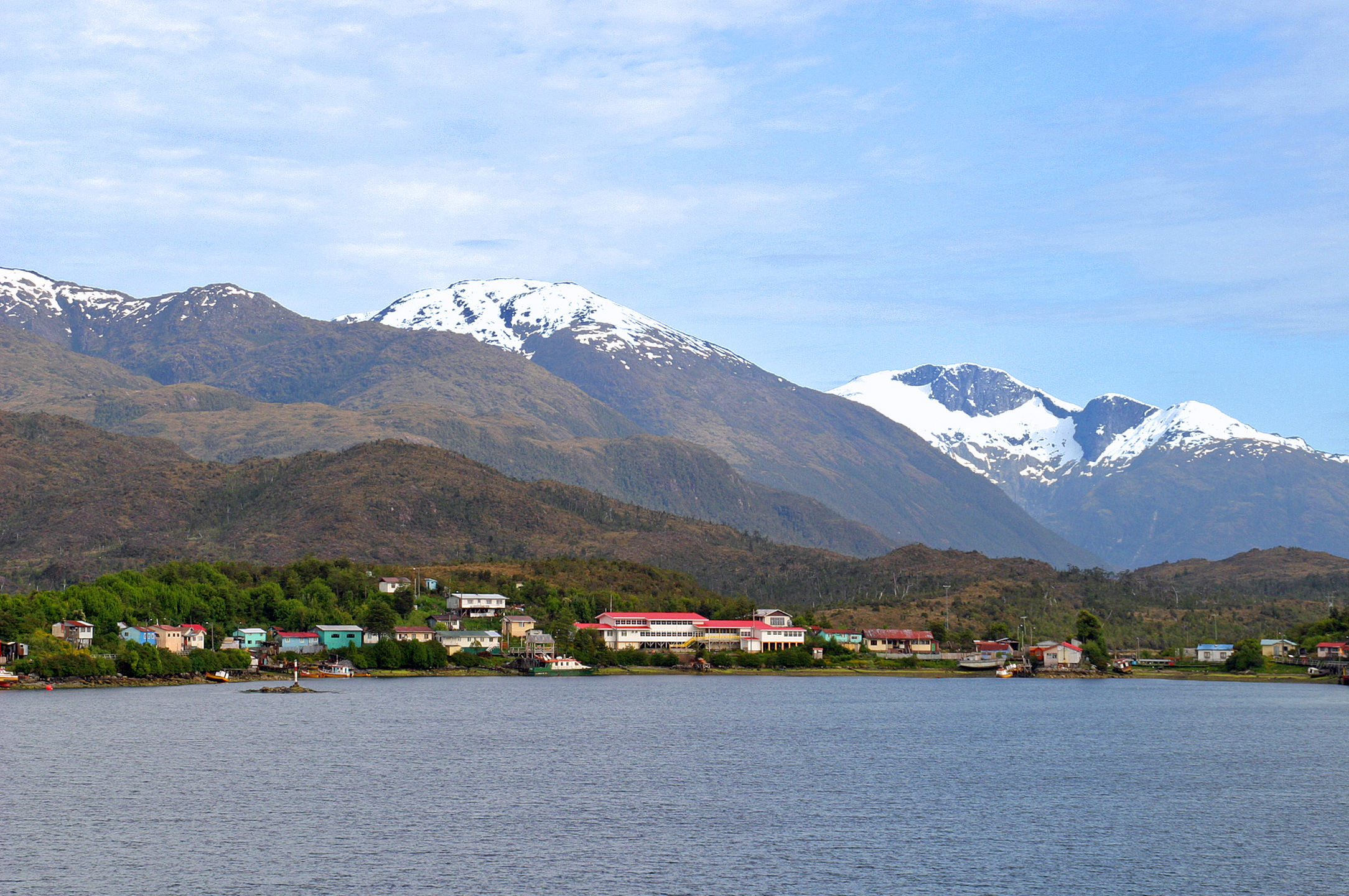
Puerto Edén - Messier-Canal

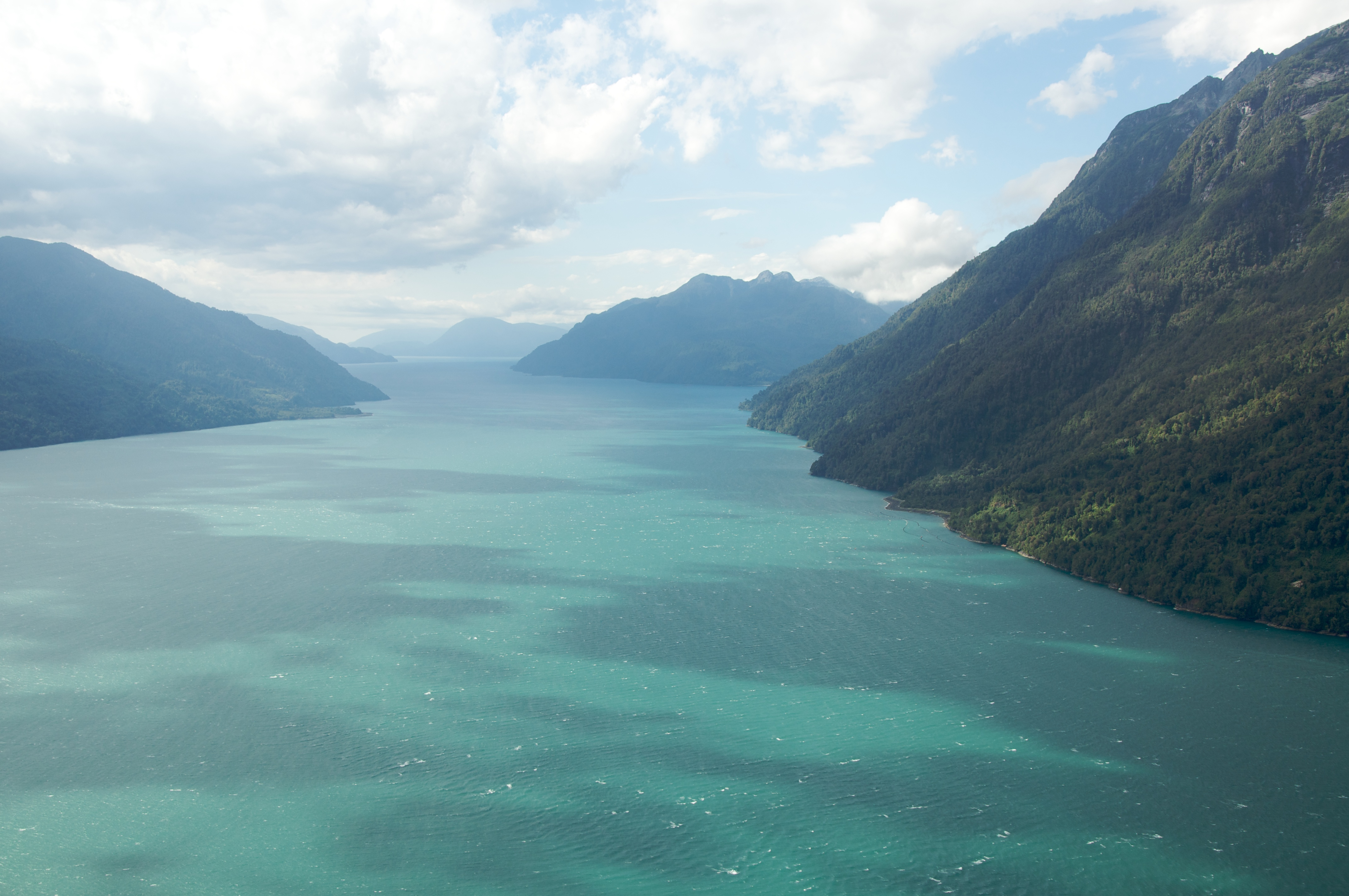
Comau Fjord in Pumalín Park

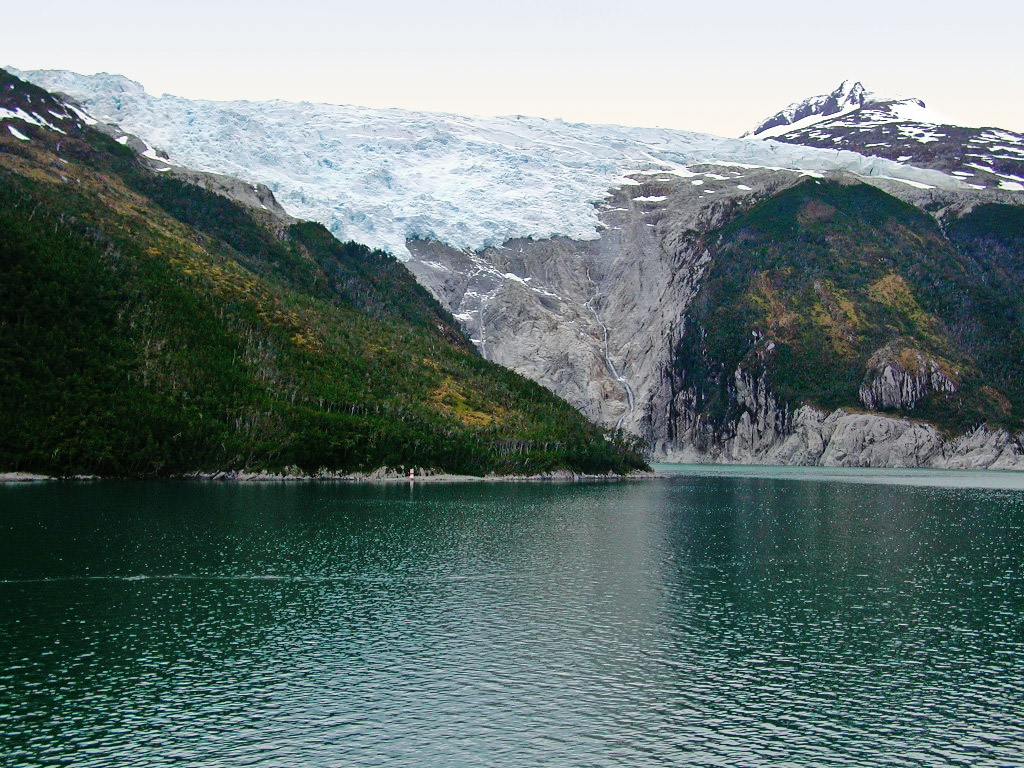
Romanche Glacier at Beagle Channel

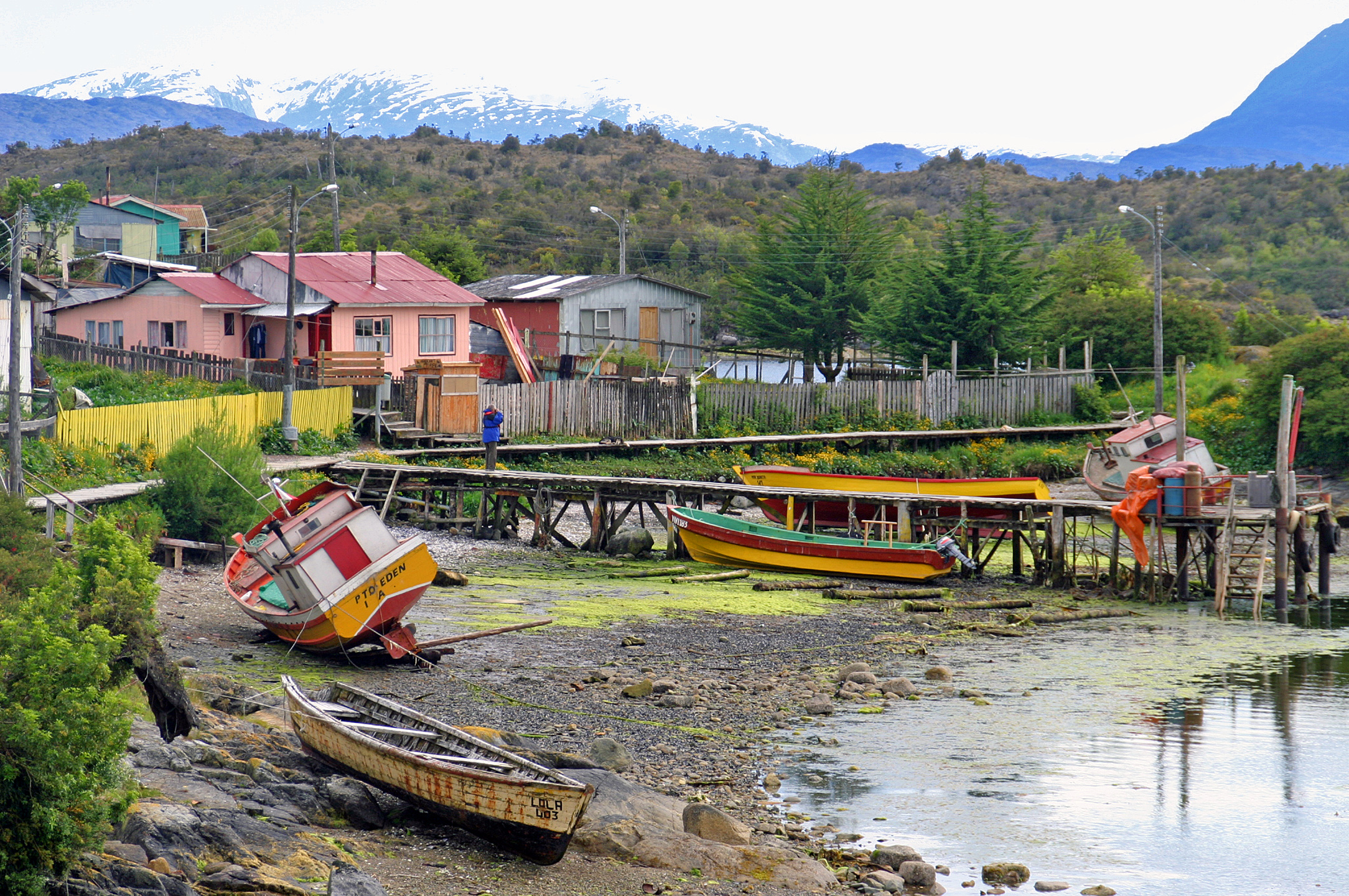
Puerto Edén - Messier-Canal

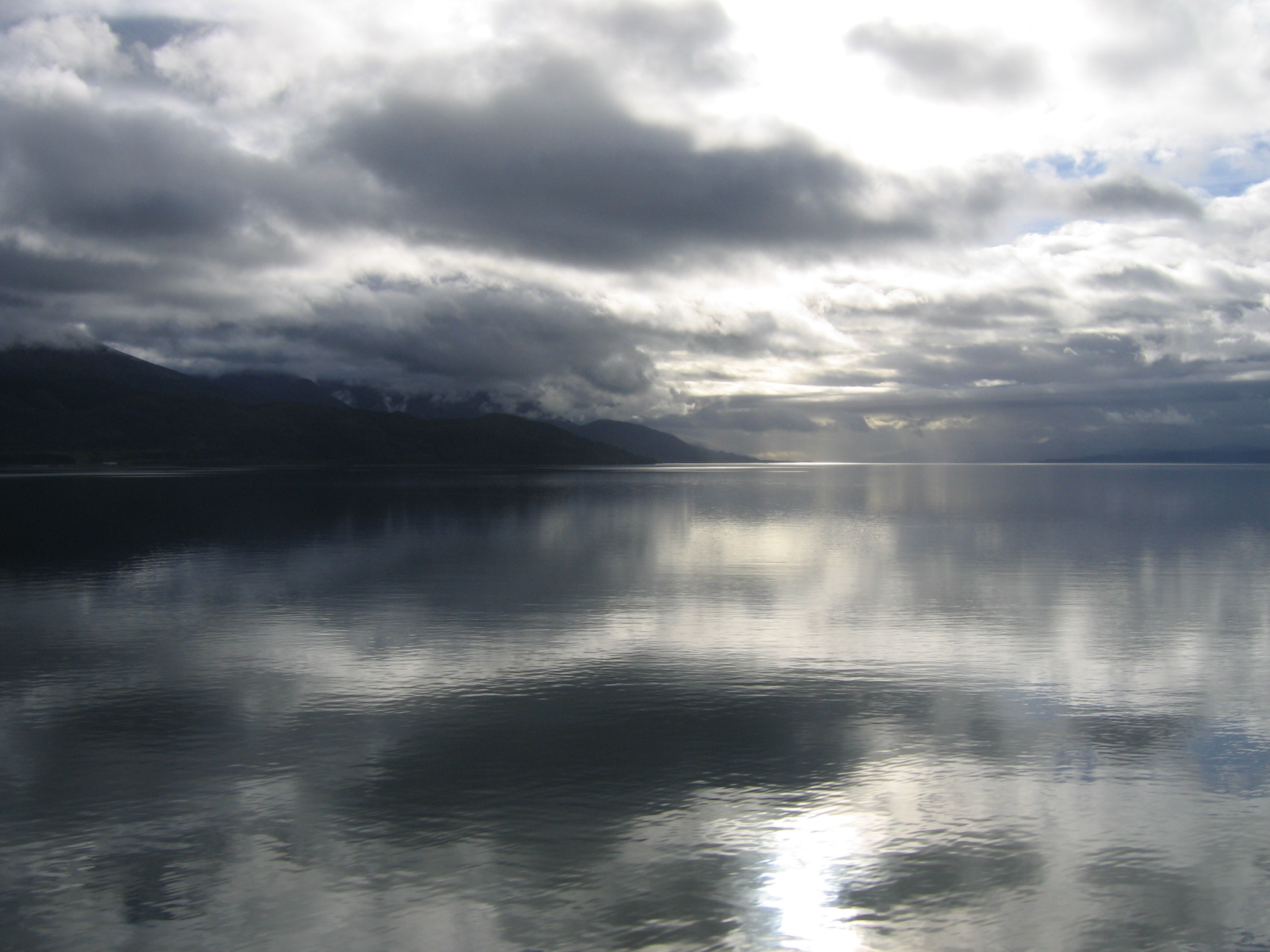
Beagle Channel, January 2006

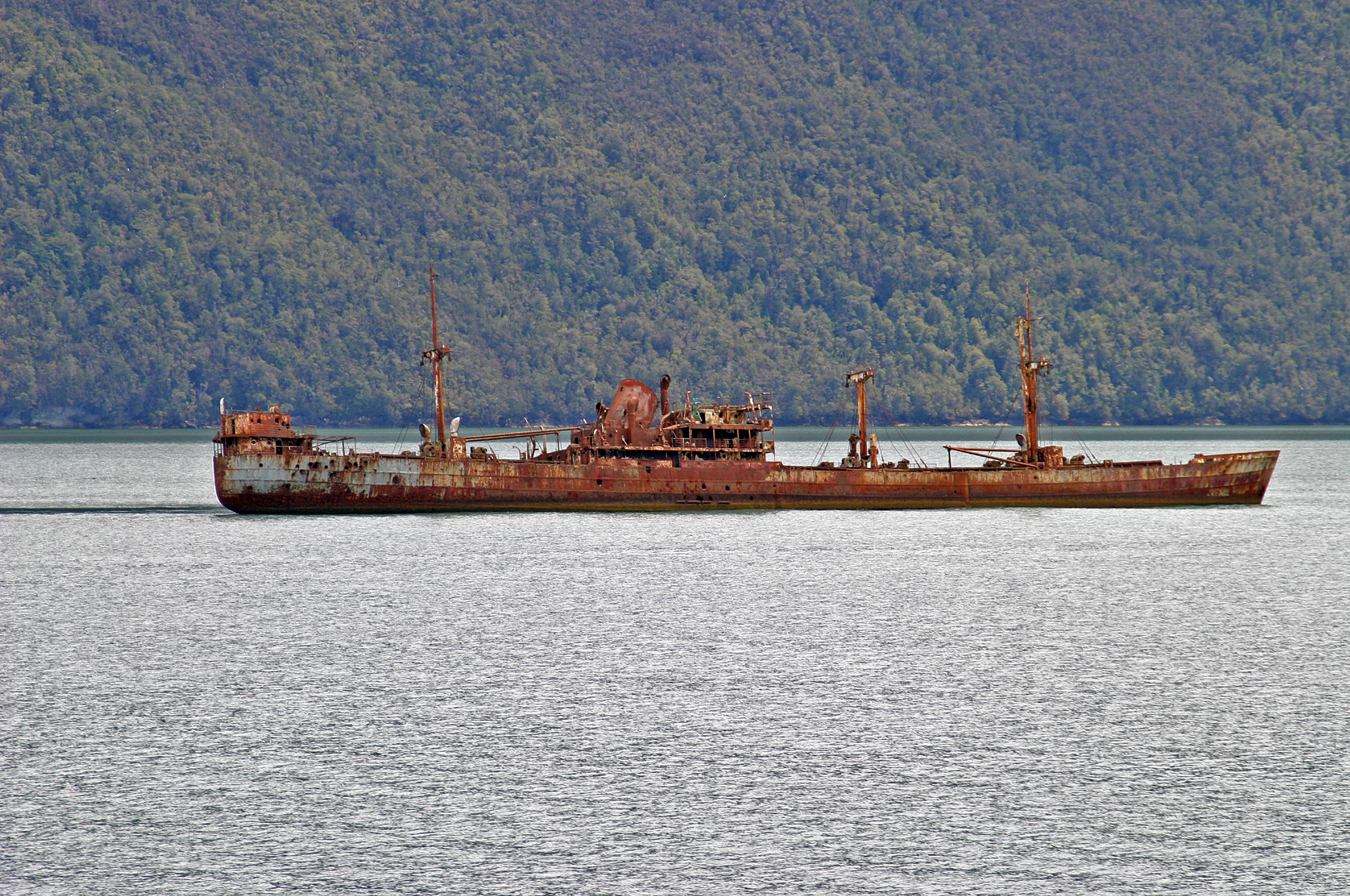
Messier-Canal

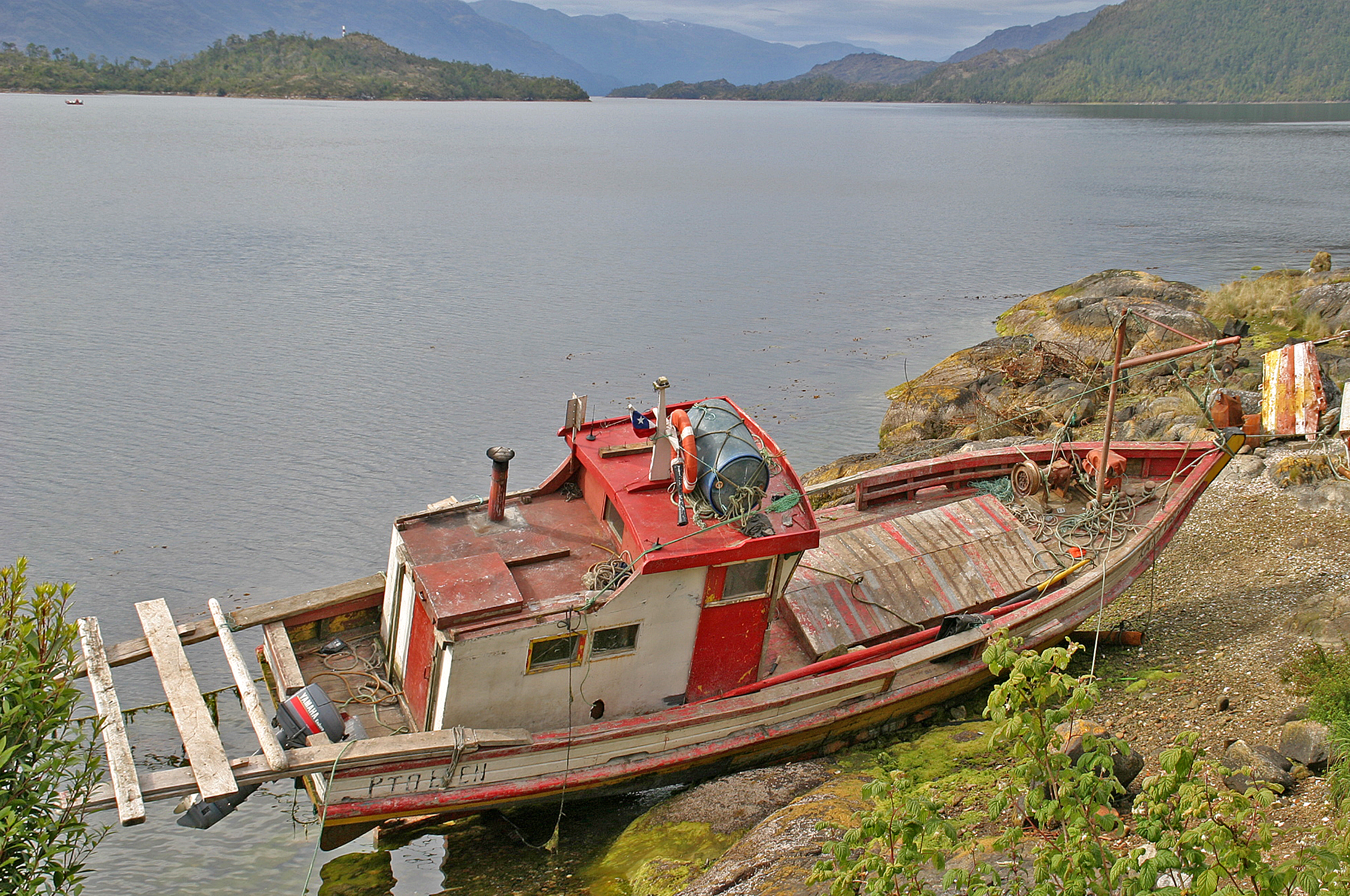
Puerto Edén - Messier-Canal

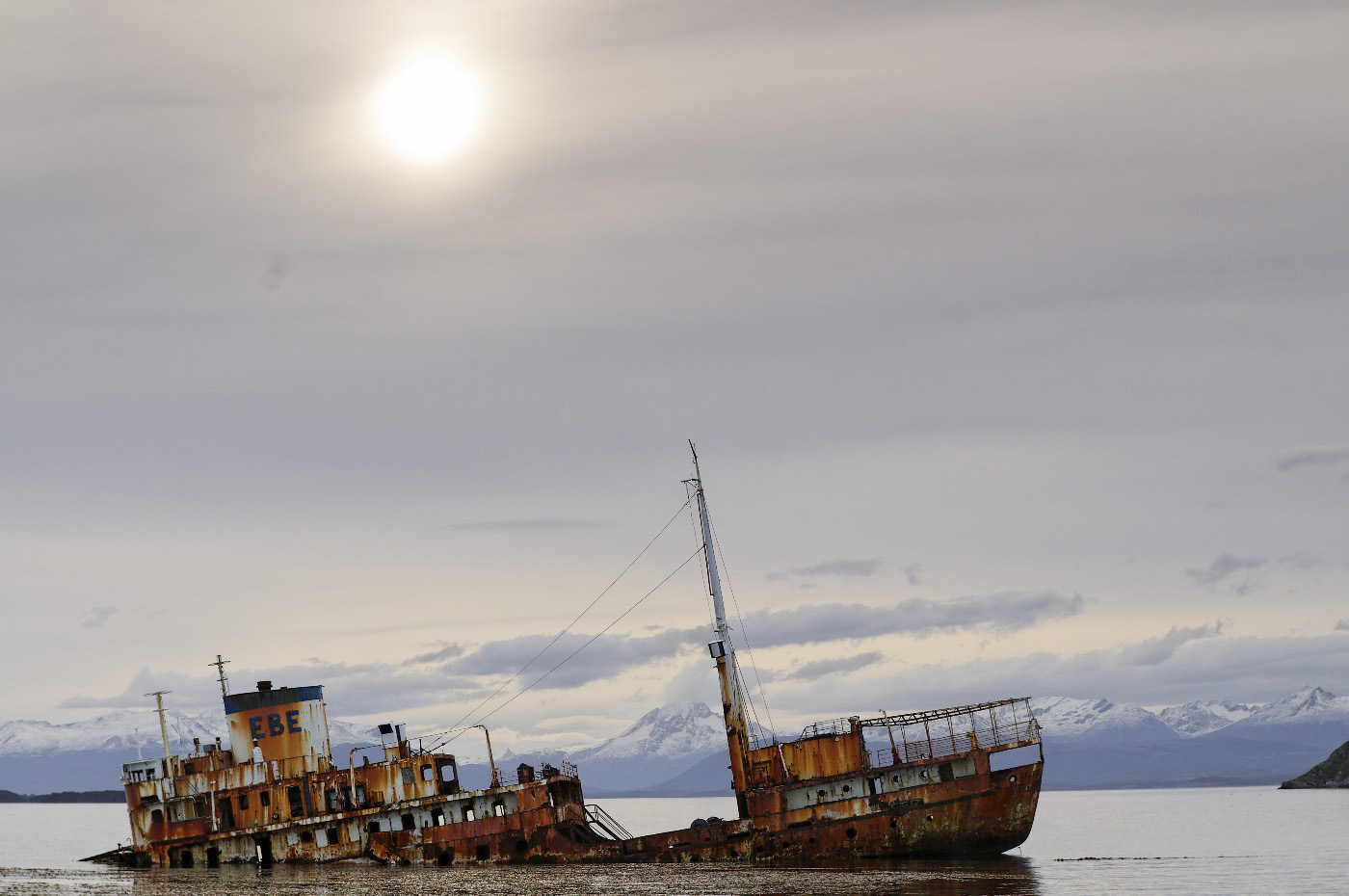
Shipwreck Logos in the Beagle Channel

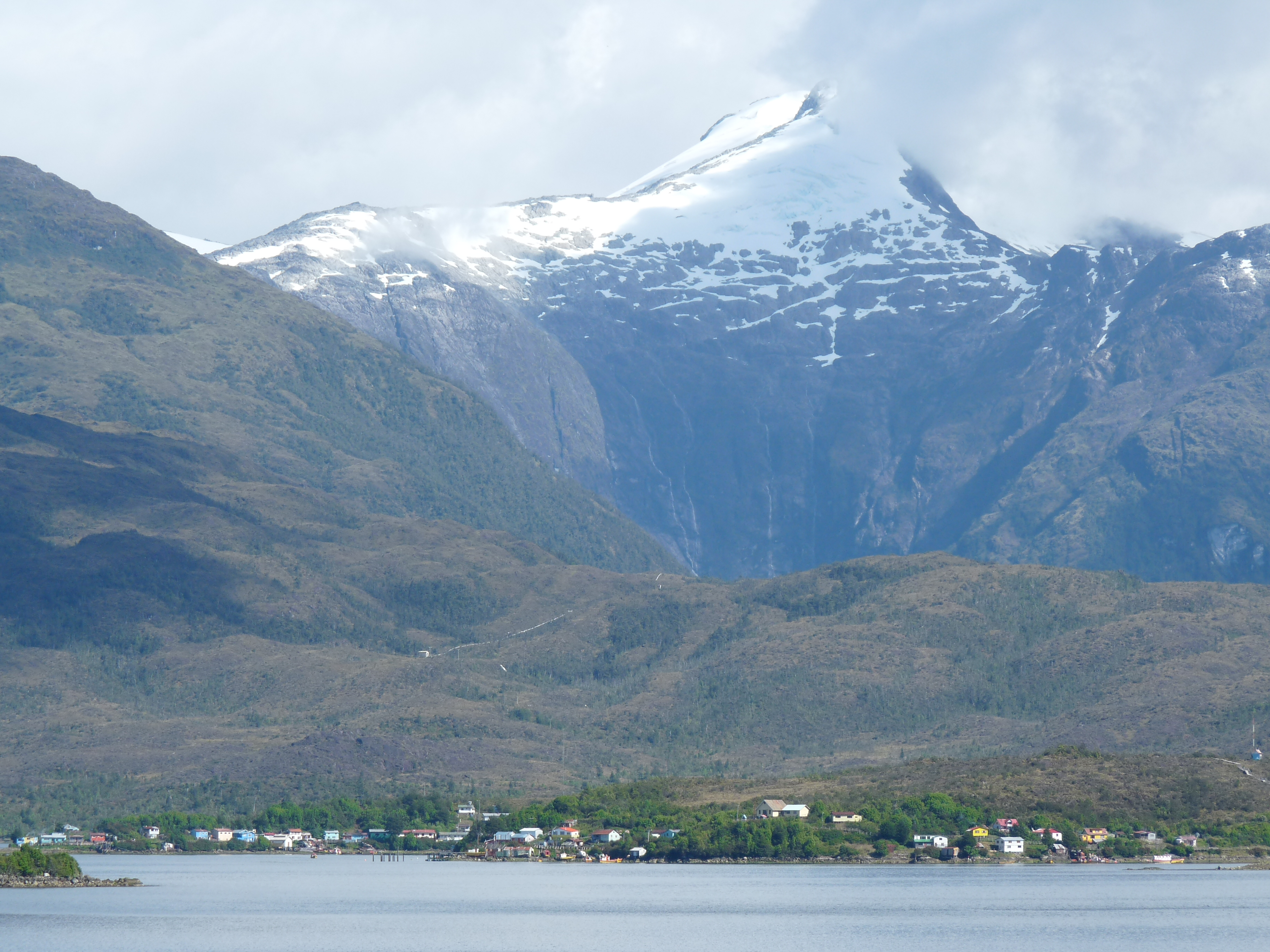
Villa Puerto Edén in Paso del Indio

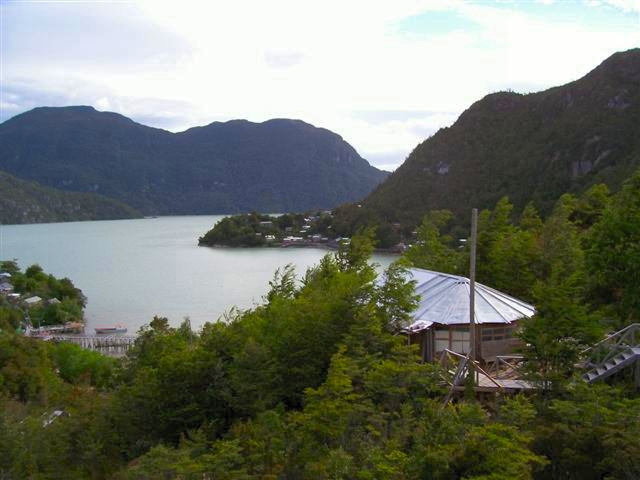
Caleta Tortel in Baker Channel

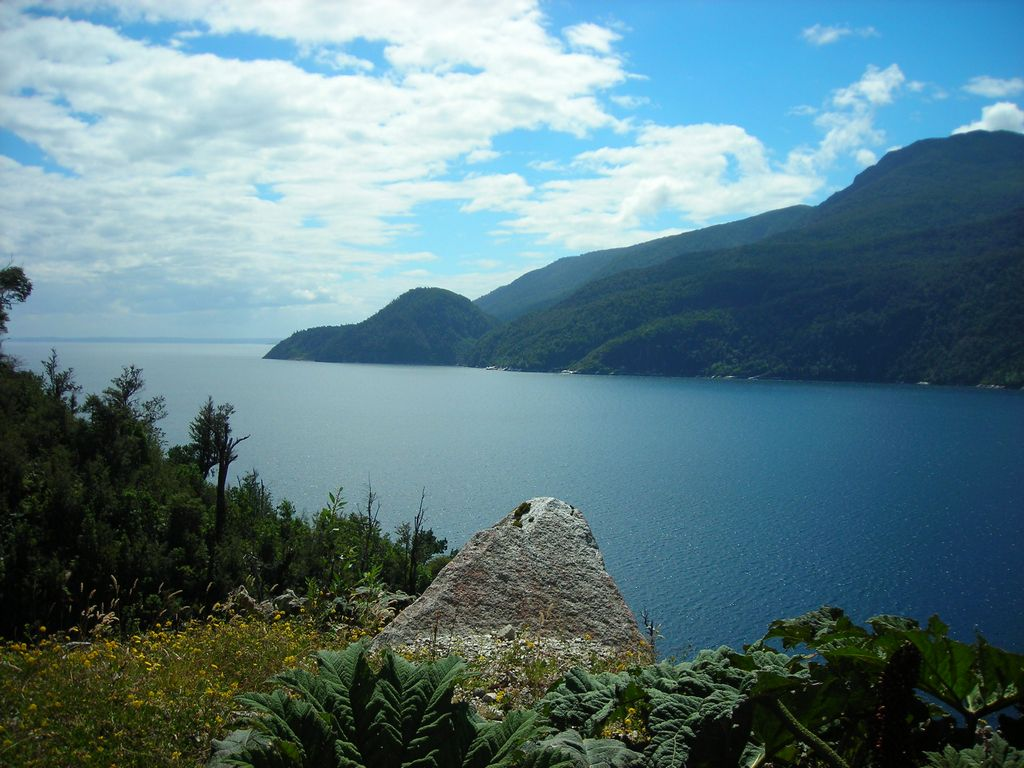
Reloncaví Estuary, Chilé's northernmost fjord

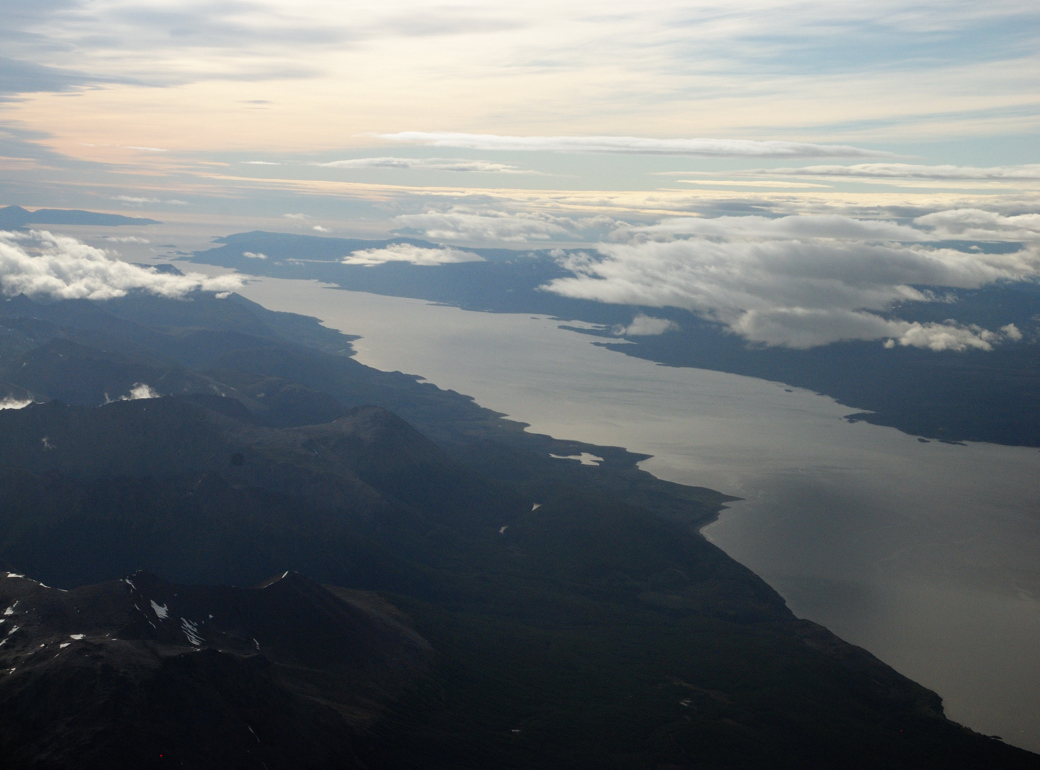
Aerial view of Beagle Channel

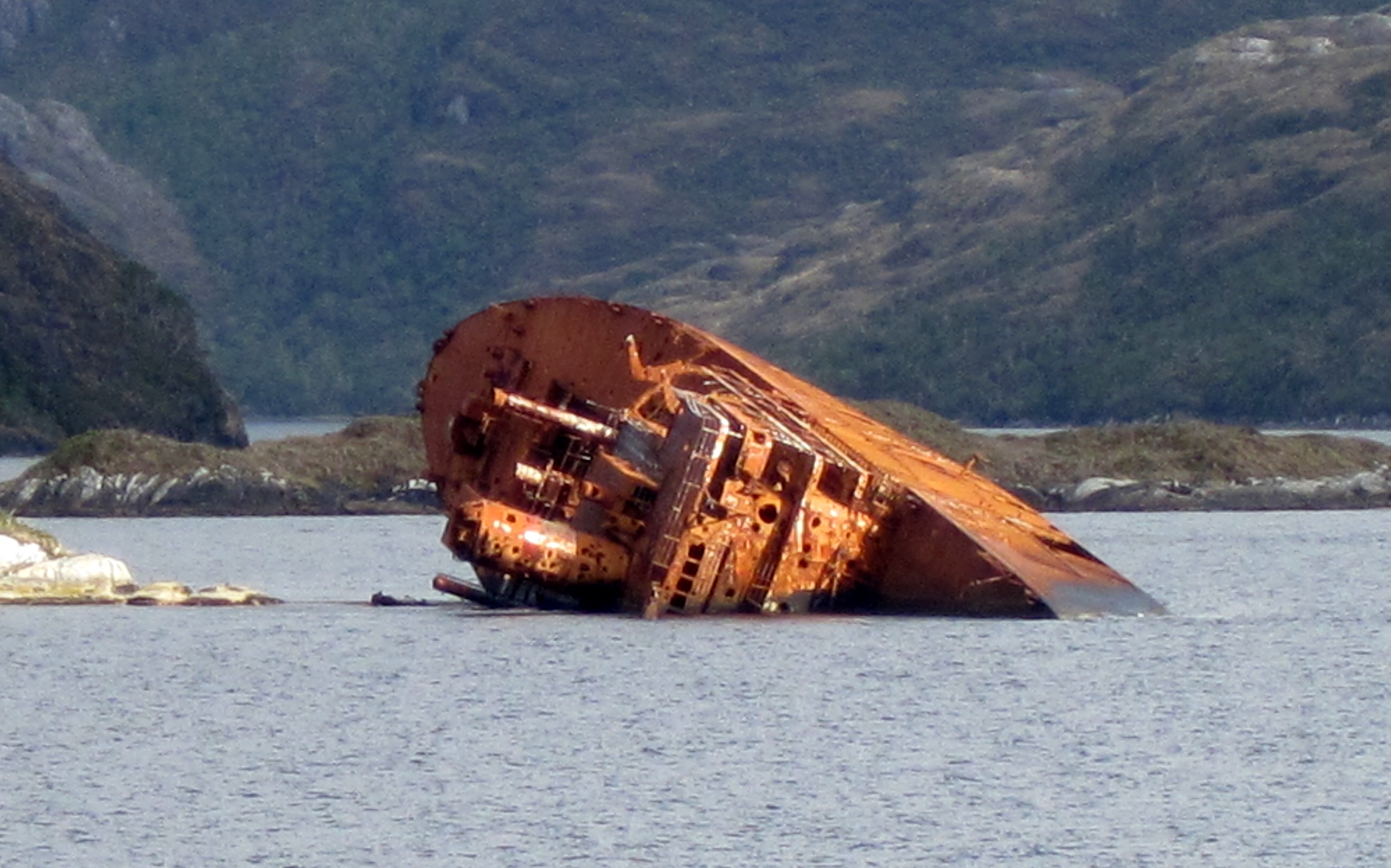
USS Riverside (APA-102) shipwreck in the Smyth Channel

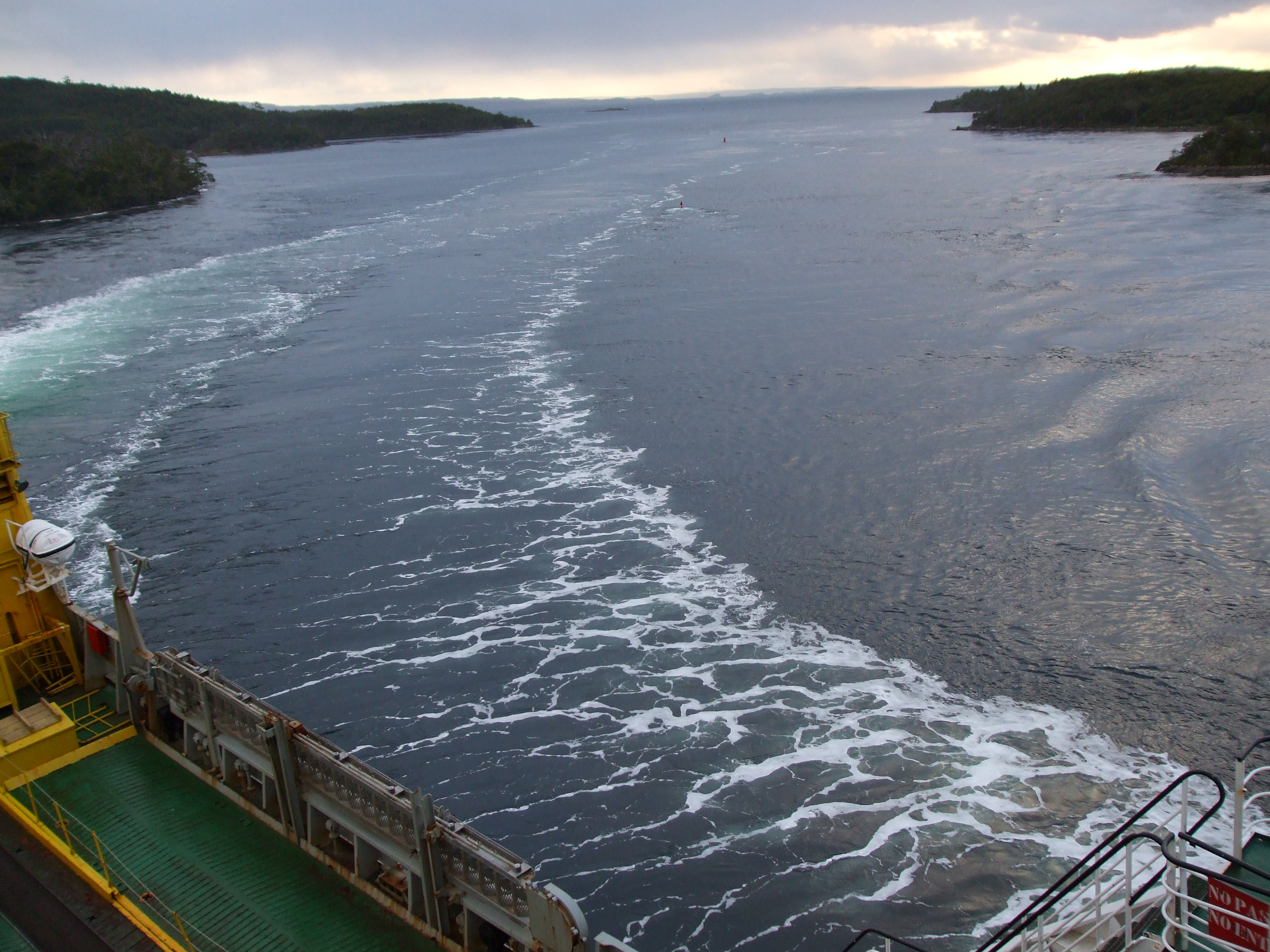
MV Evangelistas passes English Narrows early in the morning, in journey from Puerto Natales to its destination, Puerto Montt.

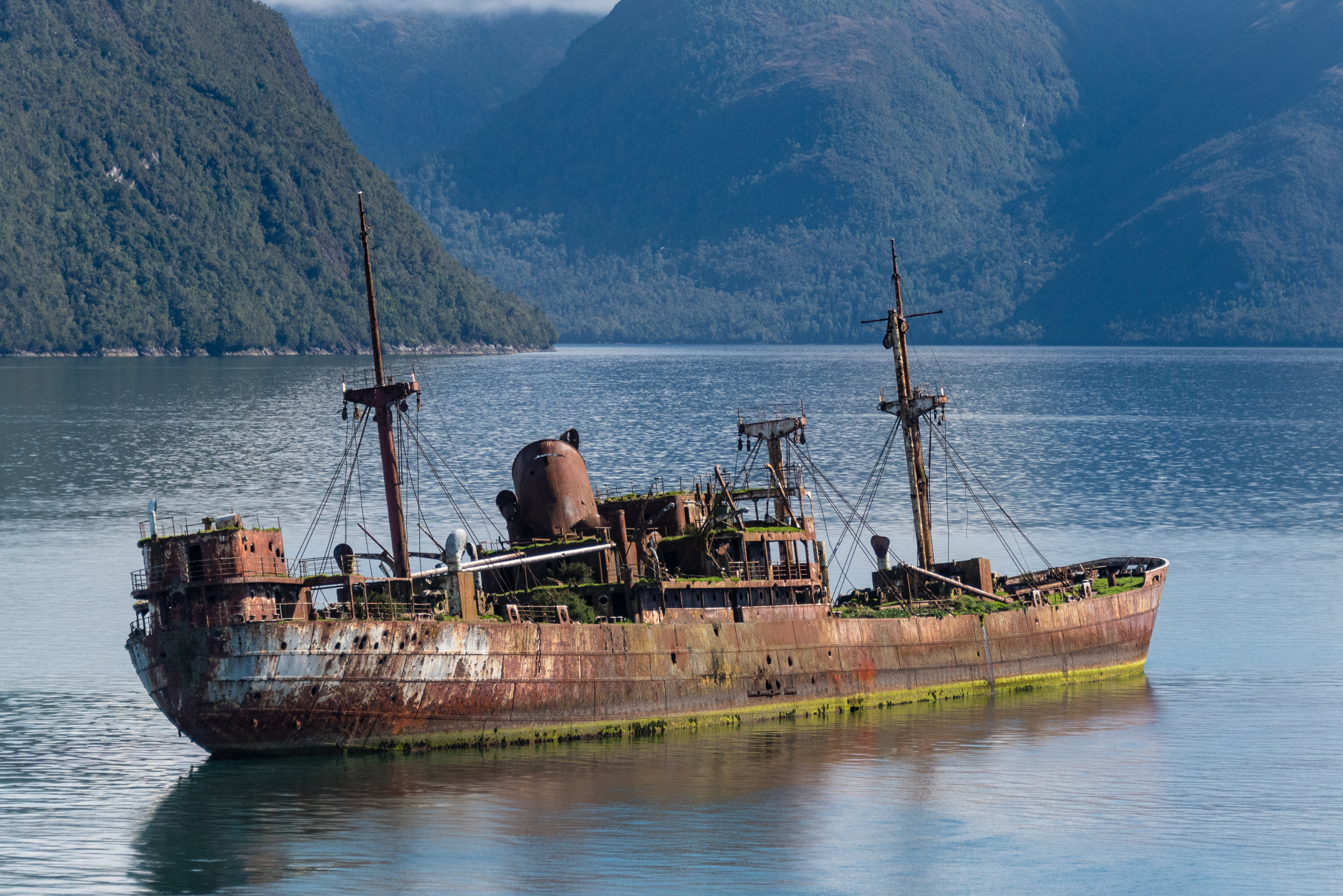
Wreck of the Capitan Leonidas serves as a warning for the submerged Bajo Cotopaxi (Cotopaxi Bank) in the Messier Channel.

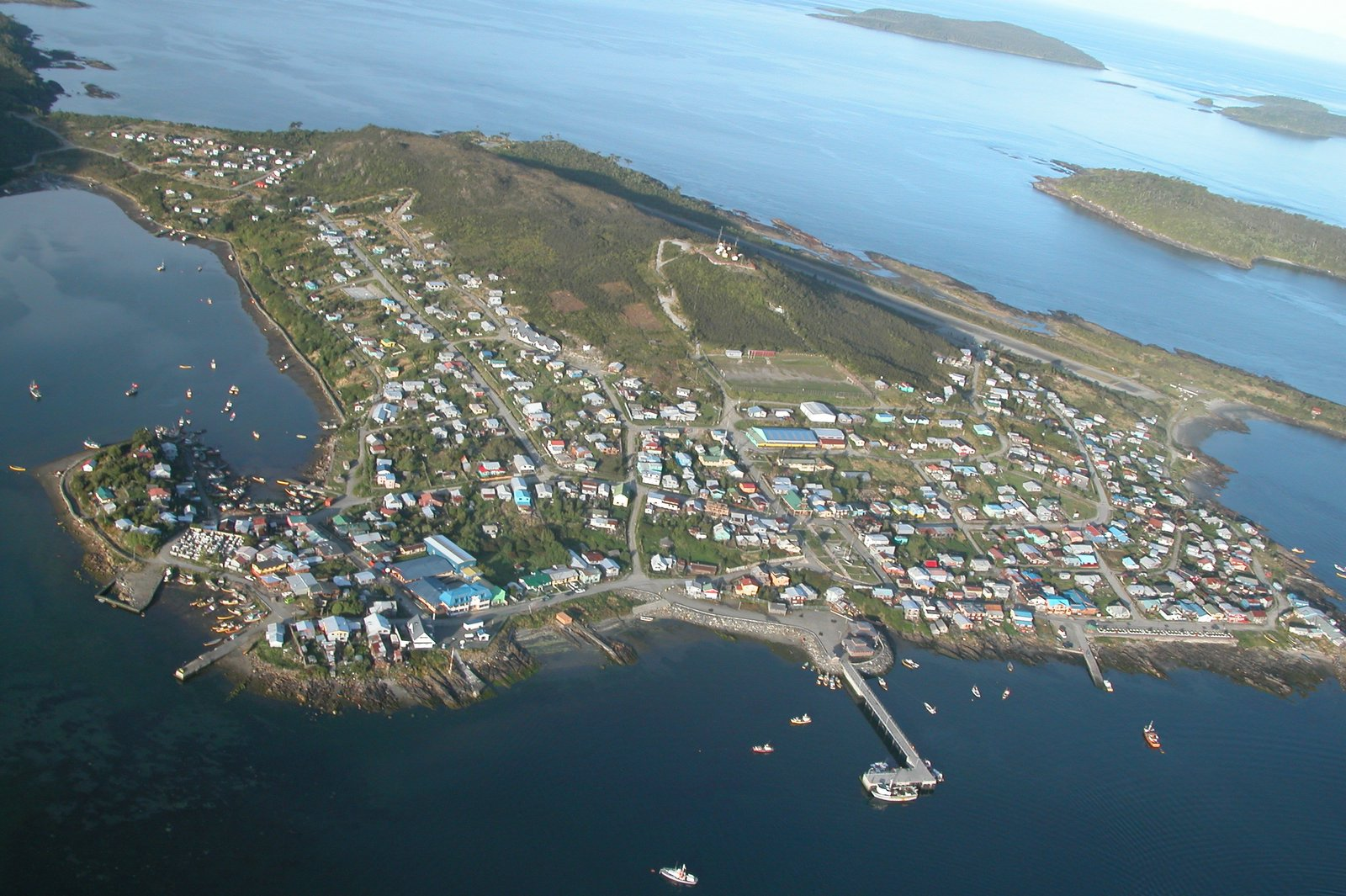
Aerial view of the Ascención Island, known as Melinka

== See also ==
- Archipelagoes of Patagonia
- Borde costero
- Geography of Chile
- Islands of Chile
- List of Antarctic and subantarctic islands
- List of fjords, channels, sounds and straits of Chile
- List of islands of Chile
- List of lighthouses and lightvessels in Chile
