= List of lighthouses in Chile: NGA1820–NGA2043 =

This is a list of lighthouses in Chile from the Gulf of Corcovado to Darwin Channel.

== Gulf of Corcovado ==
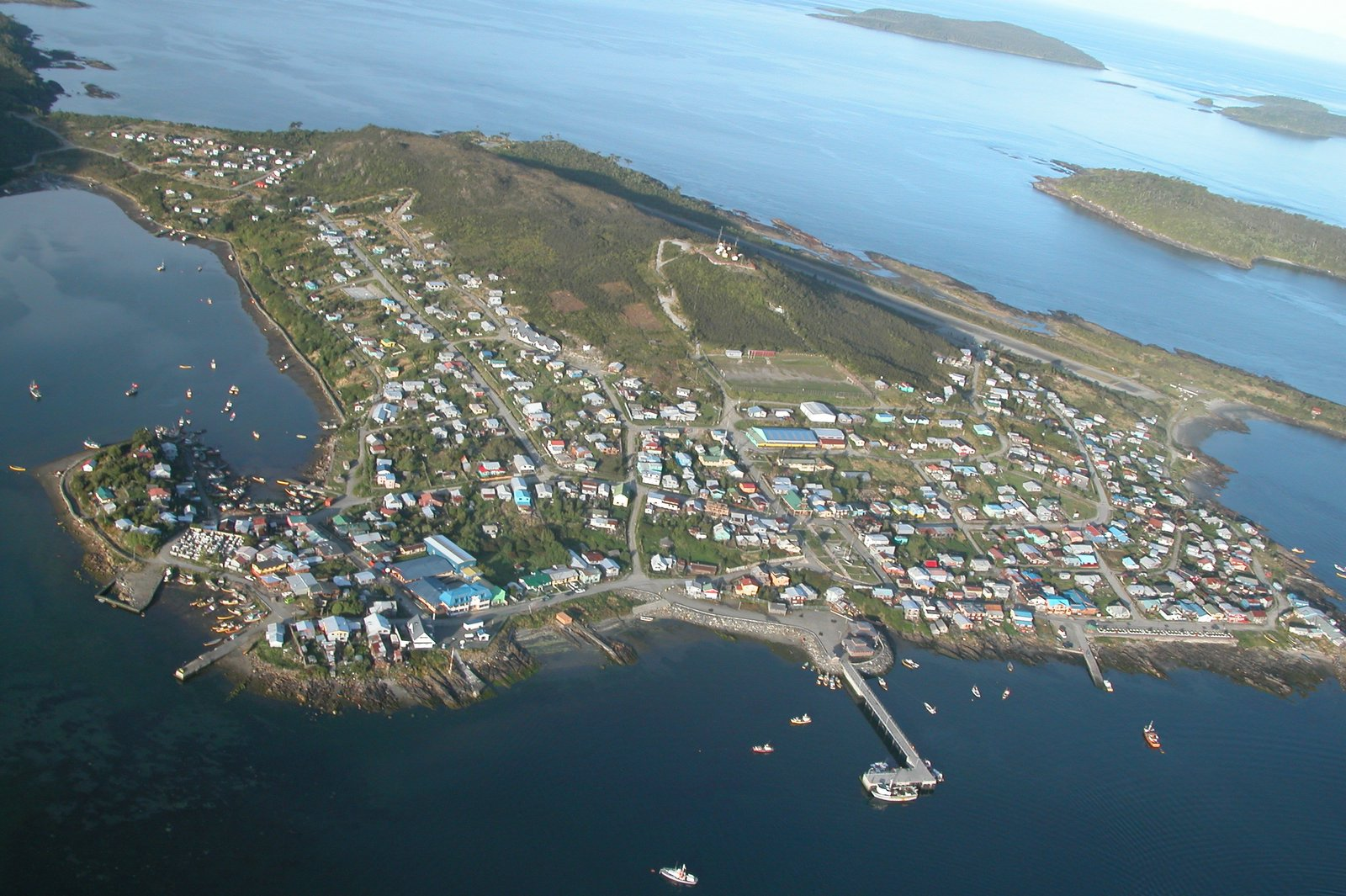
Aerial view of Melinka in the Ascención Island

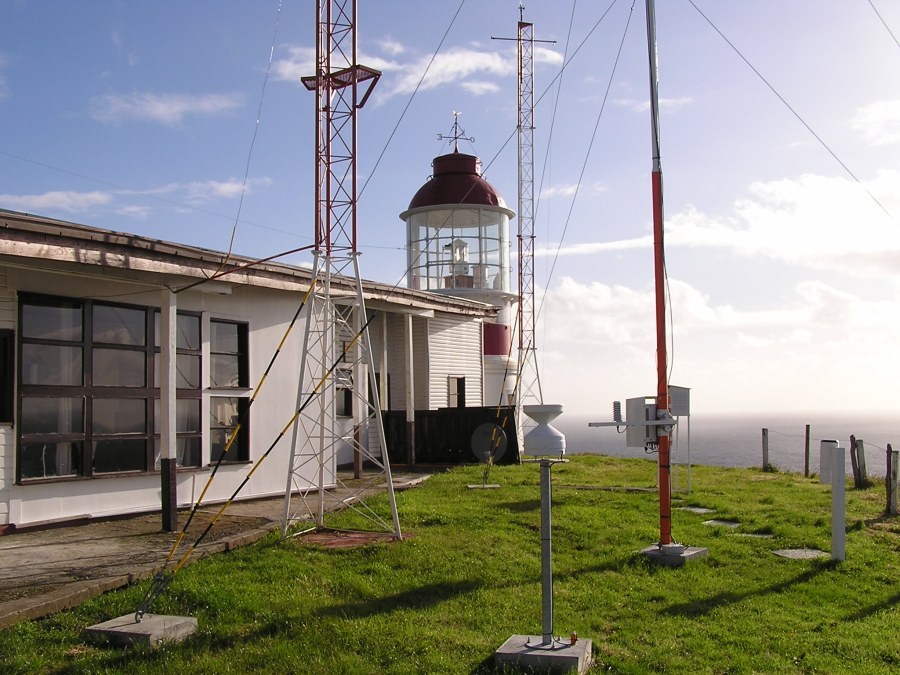
Guafo Island lighthouse

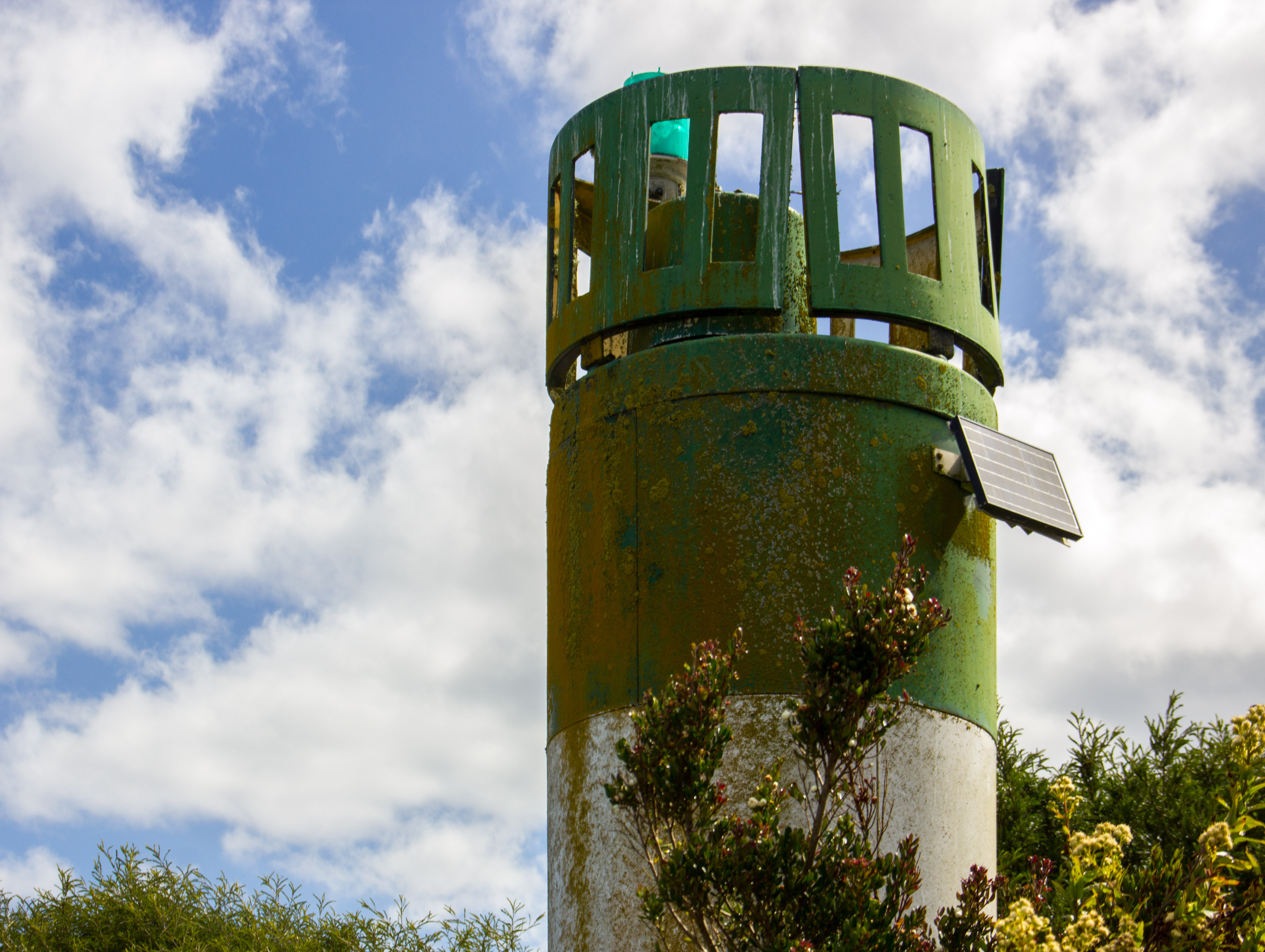
Punta Queilén Lighthouse

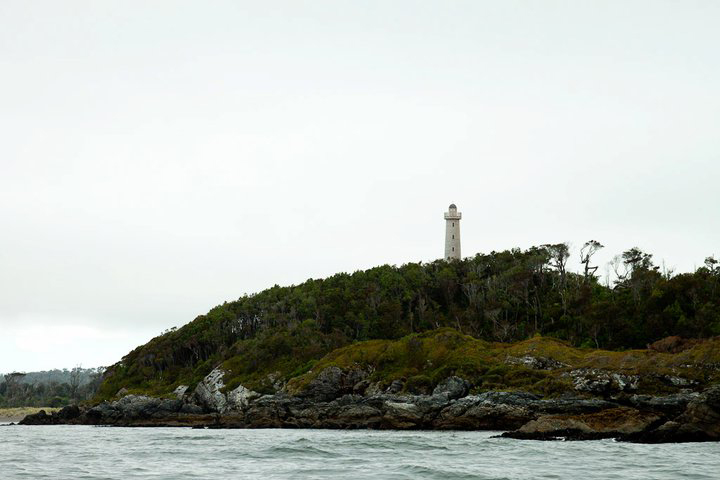
Caleta Inio Lighthouse, not registered in the NGA list

It.	NGA/Int number	Location	Coordinates	Light characteristic	Height (ft/m) Range (nmi)	Structure description	Height (ft)	Remarks
363	1820; G 1623	Roca Naranjo, off N. end of Isla Talcán.	42°41.3′S 73°00.0′W	Fl.W. period 5s fl. 0.4s, ec. 4.6s	21 6 2	White fiberglass tower, red band	10.	
364	1824; G 1622	Punta Chana.	42°46.2′S 72°51.2′W	Fl.(3)W. period 9s fl. 0.3s, ec. 1.7s fl. 0.3s, ec. 1.7s fl. 0.3s, ec. 4.7s	30 9 7	White concrete tower, red band	13.	Visible 344°-180°.
365	1826; G 1621	Punta García.	42°56.0′S 72°48.5′W	Fl.W. period 5s fl. 1s, ec. 4s	16 5 9	White fiberglass tower, red band	11.	Visible 117°-290° 30′.
366	1828; G 1620	Punta Piedra Blanca.	42°54.7′S 72°43.2′W	Fl.W. period 10s fl. 1s, ec. 9s	20 6 9	White fiberglass tower, red band	13.	Visible 074°-122°.
367	1836; G 1610	Punta Chomio.	42°53.0′S 73°27.8′W	Fl.(4)W. period 12s fl. 0.3s, ec. 1.7s fl. 0.3s, ec. 1.7s fl. 0.3s, ec. 1.7s fl. 0.3s, ec. 5.7s	39 12 7	White fiberglass tower, red band	26.	Visible 165°-032°.
368	1840; G 1611	Punta Queilén.	42°54.2′S 73°29.1′W	Fl.G. period 5s fl. 0.4s, ec. 4.6s	23 7 5	Green fiberglass tower	13.	
369	1848; G 1613	Islote Conejos.	42°54.7′S 73°35.7′W	Fl.(2)W. period 10s fl. 0.5s, ec. 2.4s fl. 0.5s, ec. 6.6s	46 14 6	Black fiberglass tower, red band	18.	
370	1852; G 1606	Isla Tranqui, on Punta Centinela.	43°01.0′S 73°20.0′W	Fl.(3)W. period 9s fl. 0.3s, ec. 1.7s fl. 0.3s, ec. 1.7s fl. 0.3s, ec. 4.7s	105 32 7	White fiberglass tower, red band	26.	Visible 141°-026°.
371	1856; G 1604	Estero Huildad, on point, N. side of entrance.	43°04.2′S 73°30.8′W	Fl.R. period 5s fl. 0.4s, ec. 4.6s	41 12 6	Red fiberglass tower	18.	Visible 231°-311°.
372	1868; G 1603	Rampa Quellón.	43°07.0′S 73°38.0′W	Fl.G. period 5s fl. 1s, ec. 4s	33 10 8	PORT (B) G, pillar	18.	
373	1872; G 1598	Punta Dirección, Isla Cailín.	43°10.3′S 73°29.9′W	Fl.W. period 5s fl. 1s, ec. 4s	30 9 6	White round concrete tower, red band	20.	Visible 216°-020°.
374	1874; G 1599	Punta Yelcho.	43°12.4′S 73°35.8′W	Fl.(3)W. period 9s fl. 0.3s, ec. 1.7s fl. 0.3s, ec. 1.7s fl. 0.3s, ec. 4.7s	26 8 6	White fiberglass tower, red band	16.	Visible 300°-226°.
375	1876; G 1597	Isla Mauchil.	43°15.6′S 73°40.1′W	Fl.W. period 5s fl. 0.4s, ec. 4.6s	26 8 7	White fiberglass tower, red band	13.	Visible 145°-005°.
376	1880; G 1596	Isla Laitec, S. extremity.	43°16.2′S 73°34.5′W	Fl.W. period 5s fl. 0.1s, ec. 4.9s	95 29 13	White fiberglass tower, red band	26.	Visible 186°-090°.
377	1884; G 1590	Islotes Queitao.	43°43.5′S 73°29.9′W	Fl.W. period 10s fl. 0.2s, ec. 9.8s	423 129 14	White fiberglass tower, red band	26.	
378	1888; G 1592	Guafo Island; RACON	43°33.8′S 74°50.0′W	Fl.W. period 10s fl. 0.2s, ec. 9.8s G(– – •)	472 144 19; 25	White round fiberglass tower, two-story dwelling	26.	Visible 359°-235°.
379	1892; G 1589	Falsa Melinka, E. end of Isla Ascensión	43°52.5′S 73°44.0′W	Fl.W. period 12s fl. 1s, ec. 11s	26 8 10	White fiberglass tower, red bands	13.	Visible 160°-010°.
380	1896; G 1588	Melinka.	43°54.2′S 73°44.8′W	Fl.R. period 6s fl. 0.5s, ec. 5.5s	20 6 3	Red iron pillar	16.	Visible 253°-105°.

== Moraleda Channel ==
It.	NGA/Int number	Location	Coordinates	Light characteristic	Height (ft/m) Range (nmi)	Structure description	Height (ft)	Remarks
381	1900; G 1586	Rada Palena.	43°45.2′S 72°56.9′W	Fl.G. period 5s fl. 0.4s, ec. 4.6s	33 10 5	White fiberglass tower, green upper part	11.	Visible 345°-097°.
382	1904; G 1584	Islote Locos.	43°59.2′S 73°27.1′W	Fl.W. period 15s fl. 0.7s, ec. 14.3s	148 45 10	White truncated conical concrete tower, red band	33.	
383	1908; G 1581	Isla Mulchey.	44°07.7′S 73°26.7′W	Fl.W. period 5s fl. 0.4s, ec. 4.6s	26 8 7	White fiberglass tower, red bands	13.	Visible 198°-012°.
384	1910; G 1583	Isla Garrao Chico.	44°18.8′S 73°44.7′W	Fl.W. period 5s fl. 0.4s, ec. 4.6s	20 6 5	White fiberglass tower, red band	11.	Visible 014°-171°.
385	1912; G 1582	Roca Negra, Canal Pérez Norte.	44°06.3′S 73°45.2′W	Fl.(4)W. period 18s fl. 0.3s, ec. 2s fl. 0.3s, ec. 2s fl. 0.3s, ec. 2s fl. 0.3s, ec. 10.8s	16 5 5	White finned metal pile	10.	
386	1916; G 1580	Isla El Gorro, N. end.	44°18.1′S 73°27.8′W	Fl.(4)W. period 12s fl. 0.5s, ec. 1.5s fl. 0.5s, ec. 1.5s fl. 0.5s, ec. 1.5s fl. 0.5s, ec. 5.5s	108 33 7	White fiberglass tower, red band	13.	Visible 160°-006°.

== Jacaf Channel ==
It.	NGA/Int number	Location	Coordinates	Light characteristic	Height (ft/m) Range (nmi)	Structure description	Height (ft)	Remarks
387	1917; G 1580.4	Isla Vico.	44°18.2′S 73°16.6′W	Fl.W. period 10s fl. 0.5s, ec. 9.5s	43 13 5	White fiberglass tower, red band	11.	Visible 041°-287°.
388	1917.2; G 1580.5	Roca Chacabuco.	44°16.0′S 73°23.8′W	Fl.(2)W. period 10s fl. 0.5s, ec. 2.4s fl. 0.5s, ec. 6.6s	56 17 6	ISOLATED DANGER BRB, pillar, red band	52.	
389	1917.5; G 1580.7	Roca Orestes.	44°29.1′S 72°43.5′W	Fl.(3)W. period 9s fl. 0.3s, ec. 1.7s fl. 0.3s, ec. 1.7s fl. 0.3s, ec. 4.7s	16 5 5	White fiberglass tower, red band	11.	
390	1920; G 1575.7	Paso Galvarino.	44°23.5′S 72°36.5′W	Fl.(4)W. period 12s fl. 0.3s, ec. 1.7s fl. 0.3s, ec. 1.7s fl. 0.3s, ec. 1.7s fl. 0.3s, ec. 5.7s	52 16 6	White fiberglass tower, red band	26.	Visible 168°-024°.
391	1922; G 1575.8	N. end.	44°22.8′S 72°36.2′W	Fl.G. period 5s fl. 0.4s, ec. 4.6s	13 4 4	White fiberglass tower, red bands	11.	Visible 142°-357°.
392	1924; G 1578	Peñón Blanco.	44°23.1′S 73°32.3′W	Fl.W. period 10s fl. 0.5s, ec. 9.5s	24 7 7	White fiberglass tower, red bands	11.	
393	1926; G 1576.5	Canal Pérez Sur, Isla Brieva.	44°37.2′S 73°52.0′W	Fl.(3)W. period 9s fl. 0.3s, ec. 1.7s fl. 0.3s, ec. 1.7s fl. 0.3s, ec. 4.7s	15 5 5	White fiberglass tower, red band	11.	Visible 145°-340°.
394	1928; G 1577.5	Punta Calquemán.	44°38.5′S 73°27.2′W	Fl.W. period 5s fl. 0.4s, ec. 4.6s	30 9 7	White fiberglass tower, red band	13.	Visible 010°-212°.
395	1932; G 1577	Cayo Blanco, N. side of entrance to Puerto Frances.	44°47.0′S 73°32.2′W	Fl.(3)W. period 9s fl. 0.3s, ec. 1.7s fl. 0.3s, ec. 1.7s fl. 0.3s, ec. 4.7s	59 18 6	White truncated conical concrete tower, red band	33.	
396	1934; G 1576.3	Islote Cervantes.	44°52.9′S 73°42.2′W	Fl.W. period 5s fl. 0.4s, ec. 4.6s	20 6 6	White fiberglass tower, red bands	11.	Visible 083°-290°.

== Puyuguapi Channel ==
It.	NGA/Int number	Location	Coordinates	Light characteristic	Height (ft/m) Range (nmi)	Structure description	Height (ft)	Remarks
397	1936; G 1575.2	Isla San Andrés.	44°56.2′S 73°19.8′W	Fl.W. period 5s fl. 1s, ec. 4s	33 10 6	White fiberglass tower, red band	18.	Visible 278°-112°.
398	1940; G 1575.3	Islote Marta.	44°49.3′S 72°58.5′W	Fl.W. period 5s fl. 0.3s, ec. 4.7s	20 6 5	White column, red band, concrete base	13.	Visible 221°-043°.
399	1944; G 1575.5	Puerto Cisnes.	44°43.5′S 72°41.9′W	Fl.G. period 5s fl. 0.4s, ec. 4.6s	30 9 3	Green fiberglass tower	13.	Visible 298°-158°.
400	1948; G 1576	Isla Tuap.	44°55.8′S 73°31.0′W	Fl.(4)W. period 12s fl. 0.3s, ec. 1.7s fl. 0.3s, ec. 1.7s fl. 0.3s, ec. 1.7s fl. 0.3s, ec. 5.7s	39 12 6	White fiberglass tower, red band	13.	Visible 029°-234°.
401	1952; G 1574	Islote Eugenia.	44°59.0′S 73°28.6′W	Fl.W. period 10s fl. 0.5s, ec. 9.5s	23 7 6	White fiberglass tower, red band	13.	Visible 159°-017°.
402	1956; G 1575	Islote El Morro.	45°08.3′S 73°37.9′W	Fl.W. period 5s fl. 0.1s, ec. 4.9s	230 70 13	White truncated conical concrete tower, red band	23.	
403	1960; G 1573.5	Islote Precaución.	45°09.5′S 73°29.9′W	Fl.R. period 10s fl. 0.5s, ec. 9.5s	39 12 7	Red fiberglass tower	13.	Visible 010°-231°.
404	1962; G 1573.4	Roca West.	45°12.8′S 73°31.7′W	Fl.(2)G. period 10s fl. 0.5s, ec. 2.4s fl. 0.5s, ec. 6.6s	15 5 6	White fiberglass tower, green band	11.	
405	1964; G 1573.3	Islote Boina.	45°12.9′S 73°31.2′W	Fl.R. period 3s fl. 0.3s, ec. 2.7s	59 18 5	Red fiberglass tower	20.	Visible 342°-201°.
406	1968; G 1568.8	Islote Santa María.	45°19.6′S 73°41.3′W	Fl.W. period 5s fl. 0.4s, ec. 4.6s	25 8 6	White fiberglass tower, red band	13.	Visible 107°-012°.
407	1970; G 1573	Isla Colorada.	45°20.7′S 73°21.2′W	Fl.W. period 10s fl. 0.5s, ec. 9.5s	20 6 8	White fiberglass tower, red bands	11.	Visible 296°-216°.

== Pilcomayo Channel ==
It.	NGA/Int number	Location	Coordinates	Light characteristic	Height (ft/m) Range (nmi)	Structure description	Height (ft)	Remarks
408	1972; G 1571	Isla Carvallo, S. end.	45°16.4′S 73°27.8′W	Fl.(3)W. period 9s fl. 0.5s, ec. 1.5s fl. 0.5s, ec. 1.5s fl. 0.5s, ec. 4.5s	39 12 6	White fiberglass tower, red bands	20.	Visible 346°-154°.
409	1976; G 1571.5	Punta Elisa, NE. side of island.	45°18.1′S 73°19.6′W	Fl.W. period 5s fl. 0.4s, ec. 4.6s	23 7 7	White fiberglass tower, red band	11.	Visible 095°-274°.

== Seno Aysén ==
It.	NGA/Int number	Location	Coordinates	Light characteristic	Height (ft/m) Range (nmi)	Structure description	Height (ft)	Remarks
410	1980; G 1571.7	Caleta Bluff, N. side of bay.	45°28.2′S 72°52.0′W	Fl.W. period 10s fl. 0.5s, ec. 9.5s	56 17 8	White fiberglass tower, red bands	11.	Visible 076°-237°.
411	1982; G 1572.6	Puerto Chacabuco, SE. Range, front.	45°28.3′S 72°49.1′W	Fl.(4)R. period 12s fl. 0.4s, ec. 1.6s fl. 0.4s, ec. 1.6s fl. 0.4s, ec. 1.6s fl. 0.4s, ec. 5.6s	39 12 3	Red fiberglass tower	26.	Visible 060°-180°.
412	1982.1; G 1572.61	Rear, 149° from front.	45°28.4′S 72°49.0′W	Fl.(4)R. period 12s fl. 0.4s, ec. 1.6s fl. 0.4s, ec. 1.6s fl. 0.4s, ec. 1.6s fl. 0.4s, ec. 5.6s	69 21 3	Red fiberglass tower	10.	Visible 060°-180°.
413	1982.2; G 1572.55	Ferry Terminal D Range, front.	45°28.2′S 72°49.0′W	F.R.	43 13 4	Iron post, red triangular daymark, yellow band	41.	Visible 060°-180°.
414	1982.3; G 1572.551	Rear, 43.5 meters 124° from front.	45°28.2′S 72°49.0′W	Fl.R. period 3s fl. 1s, ec. 2s	63 19 4	Red metal post, triangular daymark point down, yellow band	23.	Visible 060°-180°.
415	1982.4; G 1572.4	NE. Range, front.	45°27.9′S 72°49.1′W	Fl.(3)G. period 9s fl. 0.5s, ec. 1.5s fl. 0.5s, ec. 1.5s fl. 0.5s, ec. 4.5s	72 22 5	White fiberglass tower, red band	10.	Visible 013°-123°. Two range beacons in line 051°, Fl(3) R 9s, 140 meters SW.
416	1982.5; G 1572.41	Rear, 30 meters 056° from front.	45°27.9′S 72°49.1′W	Fl.(3)G. period 9s fl. 0.5s, ec. 1.5s fl. 0.5s, ec. 1.5s fl. 0.5s, ec. 4.5s	82 25 5	White fiberglass tower, red band	26.	Visible 013°-123°.
417	1984; G 1572	Punta Barruel.	45°24.8′S 72°48.6′W	Fl.R. period 5s fl. 0.4s, ec. 4.6s	16 5 3	Red fiberglass tower	13.	Visible 023°-263°.

== Errázuriz Channel ==
It.	NGA/Int number	Location	Coordinates	Light characteristic	Height (ft/m) Range (nmi)	Structure description	Height (ft)	Remarks
418	1988; G 1570.5	Islote Errázuriz.	45°32.0′S 73°48.7′W	Fl.W. period 10s fl. 1s, ec. 9s	23 7 6	White fiberglass tower, red band	20.	Visible 201°-031°.
419	1992; G 1570	Islote Diego.	45°40.0′S 73°51.8′W	Fl.(4)W. period 12s fl. 0.3s, ec. 1.7s fl. 0.3s, ec. 1.7s fl. 0.3s, ec. 1.7s fl. 0.3s, ec. 5.7s	33 10 7	White fiberglass tower, red band	18.	Visible 191°-033°.
420	1996; G 1570.6	Isla Raimapu.	45°48.6′S 73°34.8′W	Fl.W. period 5s fl. 0.4s, ec. 4.6s	29 9 11	White fiberglass tower, red band	13.	Visible 223°-083°.
421	2000; G 1570.65	Islote Los Mogotes.	45°57.0′S 73°39.0′W	Fl.G. period 5s fl. 0.4s, ec. 4.6s	23 7 4	Green fiberglass tower	13.	Visible 145°-060°.

== Darwin Channel ==
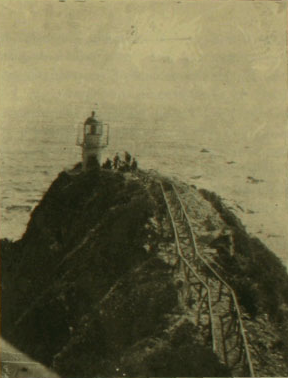
Lighthouse in Cape Rapper, in the Tres Montes Peninsula. Photo published in 1916.

It.	NGA/Int number	Location	Coordinates	Light characteristic	Height (ft/m) Range (nmi)	Structure description	Height (ft)	Remarks
422	2004; G 1569	Isla Mitahues.	45°24.7′S 73°44.6′W	Fl.(4)W. period 12s fl. 0.3s, ec. 1.7s fl. 0.3s, ec. 1.7s fl. 0.3s, ec. 1.7s fl. 0.3s, ec. 5.7s	174 53 5	White fiberglass tower, red band	11.	Visible 230°-096° 30′.
423	2008; G 1568.5	Islote del Pangal.	45°27.0′S 73°49.6′W	Fl.(3)W. period 9s fl. 0.3s, ec. 1.7s fl. 0.3s, ec. 1.7s fl. 0.3s, ec. 4.7s	20 6 6	White fiberglass tower, red band	13.	Visible 050°-250°.
424	2012; G 1568.3	Punta Mayhew.	45°27.2′S 73°54.3′W	Fl.G. period 3s fl. 0.3s, ec. 2.7s	13 4 5	Green fiberglass tower	6.	Visible 265°-124°.
425	2014; G 1568.2	Islote Maipo.	45°27.0′S 73°55.3′W	Fl.R. period 5s fl. 0.4s, ec. 4.6s	16 5 5	Red fiberglass tower	13.	Visible 128°-348°.
426	2016; G 1568	Isla Quemada, Darwin Channel, W. end	45°25.2′S 74°01.6′W	Fl.W. period 5s fl. 0.4s, ec. 4.6s	26 8 5	White truncated conical concrete tower, red bands	20.	Visible 284°-111°.
427	2020; G 1567	Punta Quilán.	45°23.6′S 74°07.6′W	Fl.(3)W. period 9s fl. 0.3s, ec. 1.7s fl. 0.3s, ec. 1.7s fl. 0.3s, ec. 4.7s	26 8 5	White fiberglass tower, red band	13.	Visible 064°-297°.
428	2024; G 1565	Roca Pájaros.	45°24.0′S 74°11.0′W	Fl.(2+1)R. period 14s fl. 0.3s, ec. 1.7s fl. 0.3s, ec. 3.7s fl. 0.3s, ec. 7.7s	26 8 6	Red fiberglass tower, green bands	13.	
429	2028; G 1564.5	Isla Isquiliac.	45°25.4′S 74°20.9′W	Fl.W. period 10s fl. 1s, ec. 9s	23 7 10	White fiberglass tower, red band	13.	Visible 274°-120°.
430	2032; G 1564	Isla Auchilú.	45°20.5′S 74°34.7′W	Fl.W. period 15s fl. 0.3s, ec. 14.7s	230 70 15	White truncated conical concrete tower, red bands	33.	Visible 210°-090°.
431	2036; G 1563	Isla Inchemo. RACON	45°48.5′S 74°58.4′W	Fl.W. period 10s fl. 0.2s, ec. 9.8s M(– –)	105 32 14	White concrete tower, red band	13.	Visible 231°-118°.
432	2037; G 1563.5	Isla Ricado.	45°49.4′S 74°28.6′W	Fl.(4)W. period 12s fl. 0.3s, ec. 1.7s fl. 0.3s, ec. 1.7s fl. 0.3s, ec. 1.7s fl. 0.3s, ec. 5.7s 66 20	6 2 4	White fiberglass tower with red band	13.	Visible 055°-219°.
433	2037.5; G 1563.7	Isla Lucía.	45°42.0′S 74°08.2′W	Fl.G. period 5s fl. 0.4s, ec. 4.6s	16 5 5	Green fiberglass tower	13.	Visible 284°-108°.
434	2038; G 1563.6	Punta Morro.	45°46.2′S 74°20.0′W	Fl.(3)W. period 9s fl. 0.3s, ec. 1.7s fl. 0.3s, ec. 1.7s fl. 0.3s, ec. 4.7s	26 8 4	White fiberglass tower, red band	11.	Visible 090°-300°.
435	2038.5; G 1563.8	Punta Urízar.	45°41.7′S 74°16.7′W	Fl.W. period 5s fl. 0.3s, ec. 4.7s	18 5 5	White fiberglass tower, red band	13.	Visible 280°-080°.
436	2039; G 1563.3	Isla Centro.	45°47.2′S 74°40.2′W	Fl.W. period 5s fl. 0.4s, ec. 4.6s	20 6 5	White fiberglass tower, red band	11.	Visible 258°-119°.
437	2040; G 1562	Cabo Raper.	46°49.1′S 75°38.0′W	Fl.W. period 5s fl. 0.1s, ec. 4.9s	200 61 18	White round concrete tower, dwelling	46.	Visible 331°-175°.
438	2041; G 1563.2	Isla Dirección.	45°48.9′S 74°46.3′W	Fl.(4)W. period 12s fl. 0.3s, ec. 1.7s fl. 0.3s, ec. 1.7s fl. 0.3s, ec. 1.7s fl. 0.3s, ec. 5.7s	33 10 5	White fiberglass tower, red band	11.	Visible 060°-283°.
439	2043; G 1558.49	Punta Piedras. -RACON	49°16.2′S 75°29.0′W	Fl.W. period 10s fl. 0.2s, ec. 9.8s O(– – –)	59 18 14; 18	White fiberglass tower, red band	13.	Visible 245°-080°.

== See also ==
- List of fjords, channels, sounds and straits of Chile
- List of islands of Chile
