= Mitchell Fjord =

Fjord in the South of Chile

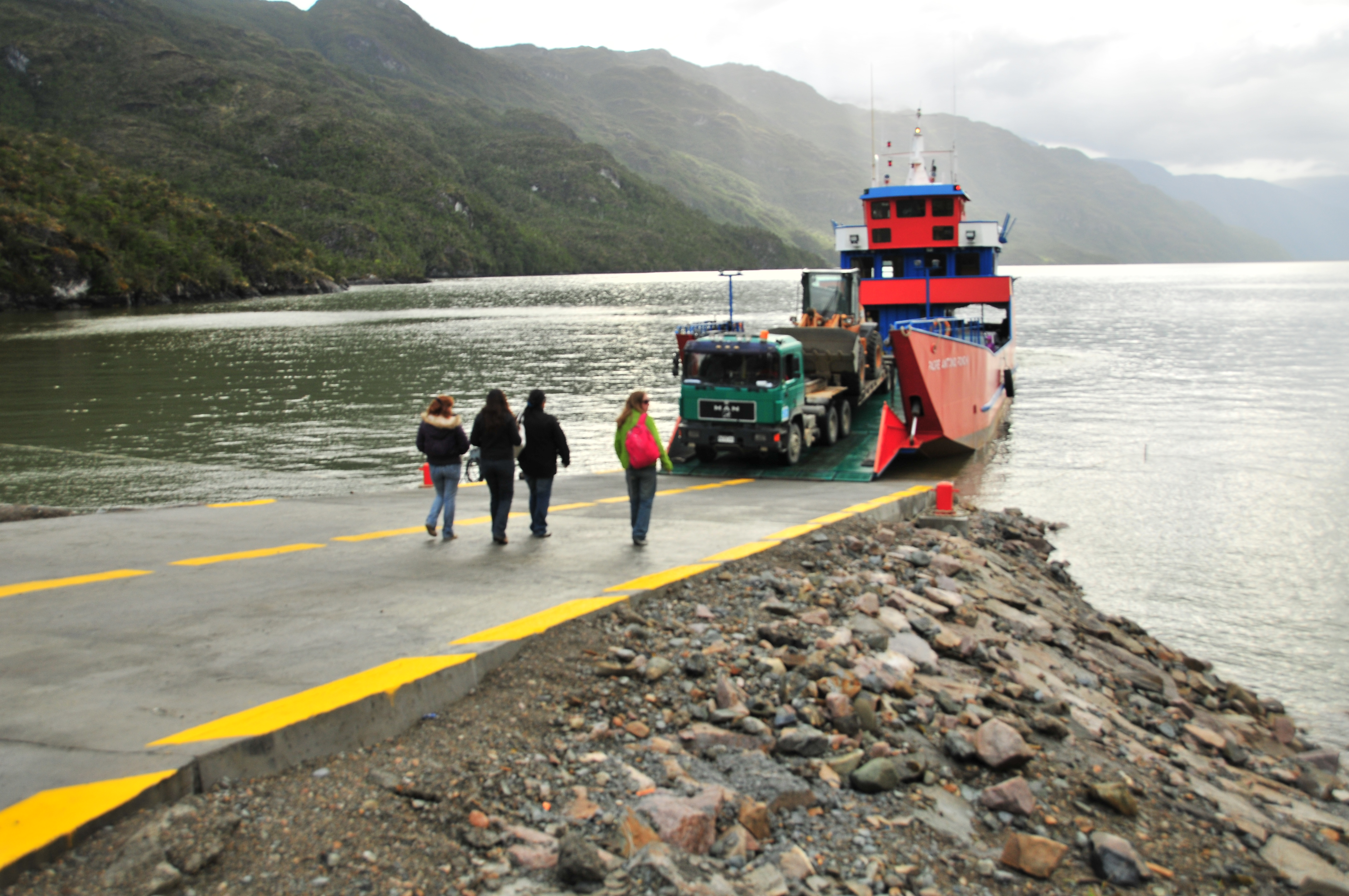
Puerto Yungay

Mitchell Fjord is a 30- to 50-km long fjord in Aysén Region, Chile, stretching southeast from the vicinities of Baker Channel into the valley of Bravo River. Through a ferry based on Puerto Yungay, the channel provides access to the southernmost portion of Carretera Austral and constitutes thus the only discontinuous section of Carretera Austral south of Chaitén.

== Tributaries ==
The fjord receives the waters of the Baker Channel.
