= Villa La Tapera =

Coordinates: 44°13′00″S 71°49′00″W

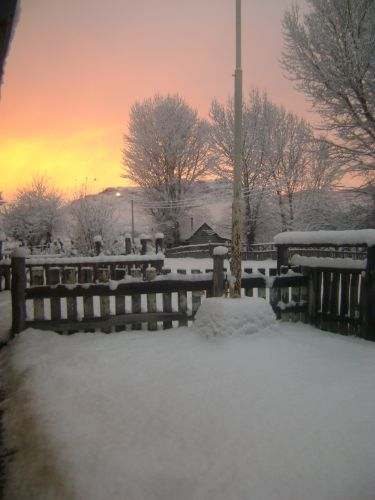
- Interactive map of Villa La Tapera
- Region: Aisén
- Province: Coihaique
- Municipalidad: Lago Verde
- Comuna: Lago Verde

Government
  - Type: Municipalidad
  - Alcade: Gaspar Aldea Cadagan

Population (2002 census)
  - Total: 265
- Time zone: UTC−04:00 (Chilean Standard)
  - Summer (DST): UTC−03:00 (Chilean Daylight)
- Area code: Country + town = 56 + ?
- Climate: Cfb

Villa La Tapera is a Chilean hamlet (Spanish: caserío) in Coihaique Province, Aisén Region. It is the administrative center of the commune of Lago Verde.
