= Darwin Channel =

Marine Channel

Coordinates: 45°25′S 74°10′W

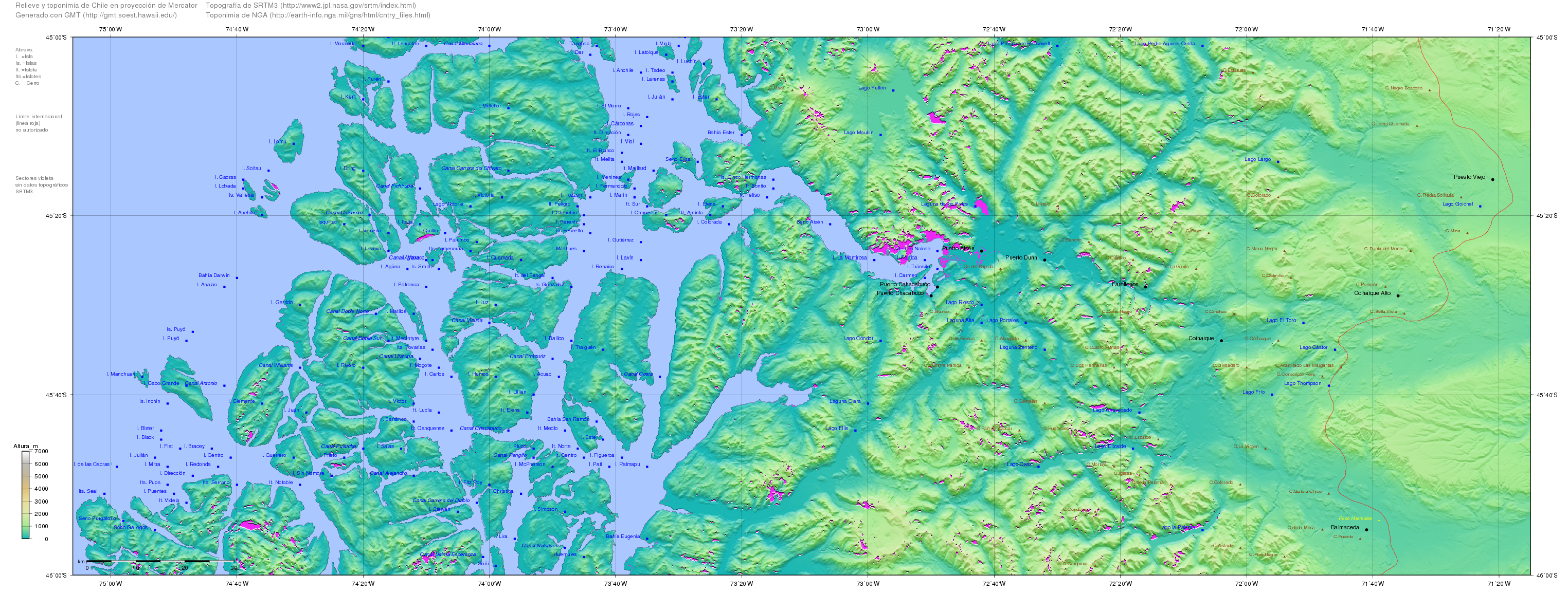

Red arrows mark the Darwin Channel.
Aysen Fjord is the eastwards sound

The Darwin Channel (Span.: Canal Darwin) is a marine channel, which forms a westward continuation of the Aisén Fjord and links it to the Pacific Ocean at Isquiliac Island. It is located in the coast of Chile at approximately 45.4° south latitude and was named after Charles Darwin in 1982.

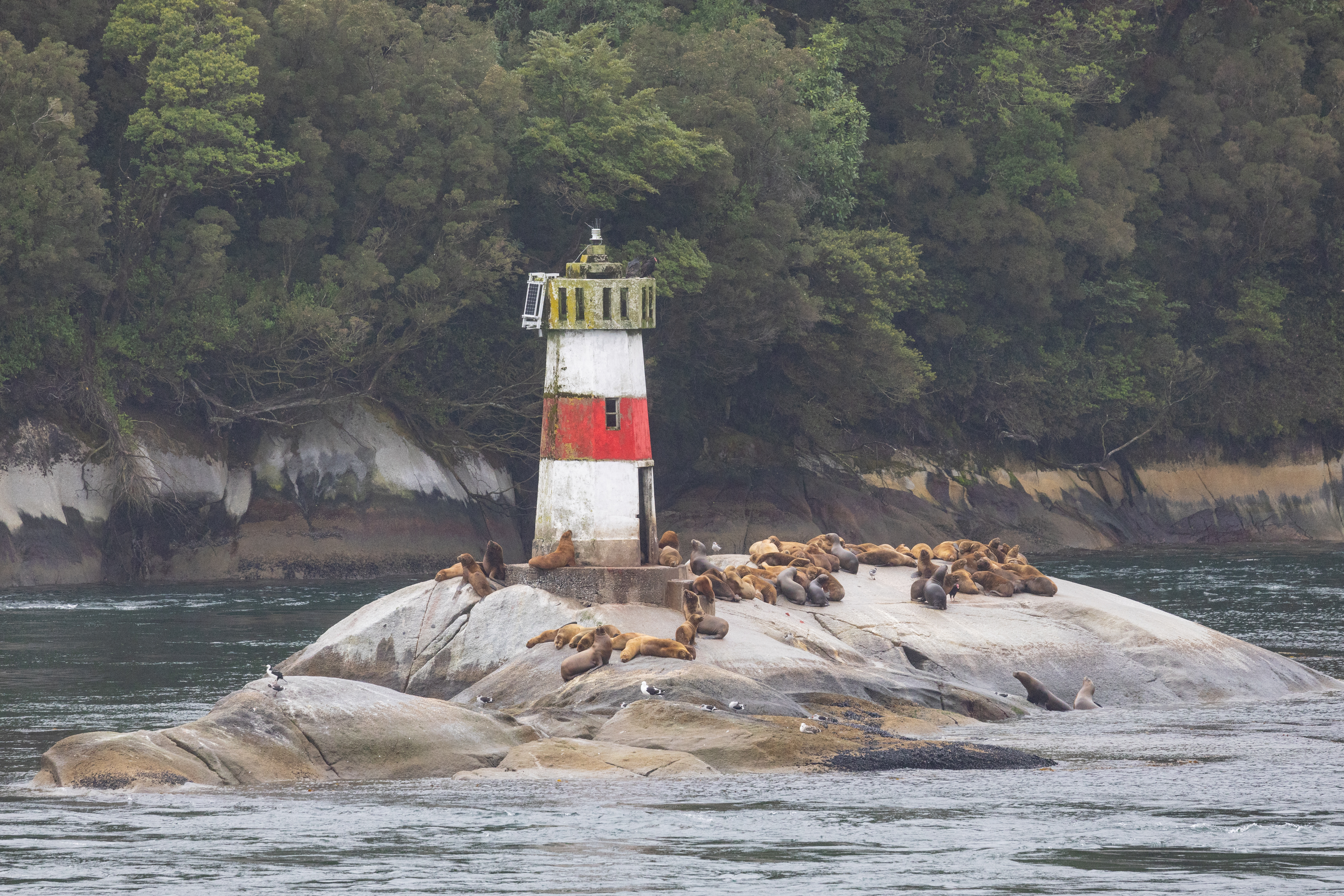
South American sea lions on an islet in the Darwin Channel.

This is one of the main channels situated between the islands of the Chonos Archipelago. Darwin Channel opens in the northern part of Darwin Bay and is considered the best of those which lead to Moraleda Channel, its navigation is free of dangers.
