= Kinnier =

Kinnier is a surname. Notable people with the surname include:

- Douglas Reid Kinnier (1858–1916), British seaman
- Keith Robert Martin Kinnier (1902–1969), British seaman
