= Ramírez Island =

Island in the Queen Adelaide Archipelago

Native name: Isla Ramírez
- Location within Southern Patagonia

Geography
- Coordinates: 51.82°S 75.01°W
- Adjacent to: Pacific Ocean
- Area: 163.2 km^{2} (63.0 sq mi)
- Length: 24 km (14.9 mi)
- Width: 10 km (6 mi)
- Coastline: 80.7 km (50.14 mi)
- Highest point: Bloxam (610m)

Administration
- Chile
- Region: Magallanes y Antártica Chilena
- Province: Última Esperanza Province
- Commune: Puerto Natales

Additional information
- NGA UFI=-898687

Ramírez Island is an island in the Queen Adelaide Archipelago, located west of Vidal Gormaz Islands and Rennell Islands and south of Nelson Strait.

== See also ==
- List of islands of Chile
