= Douglas Reid Kinnier =

- Born: 20 October 1858; Saltcoats, Ayrshire
- Died: 24 December 1916 (aged 58)
- Military career
- Allegiance: United Kingdom
- Branch: British Merchant Navy
- Rank: Merchant Navy Captain and honorary lieutenancy in the Royal Naval Reserve
- Unit: RMS Ortega
- Commands: Evaded pursuit of the German cruiser Dresden
- Awards: DSC

Captain Douglas Reid Kinnier DSC (20 October 1858 – 24 December 1916) was a distinguished British seaman who rose to prominence in the early months of the First World War for a daring escape from the German cruiser SMS Dresden in uncharted seas in the vicinity of the Magellan Straits.

== Background ==
Captain Kinnier was born on 20 October 1858, the second son of Robert Snodgrass Kinnier, a surgeon, and Agnes Corse Stirling, daughter of Glasgow manufacturer William Stirling and a niece of Hugh Auchincloss, the New York merchant. He grew up in Saltcoats, Ayrshire until, against his father's wishes, he went to sea in 1874. On 20 May 1889 he married Minnie Agnes Martin and had five children: Major Douglas Reid Kinnier T.D., Hugh Stirling Kinnier, Anna Josephine Kinnier, Gertrude Kinnier and Captain Keith Robert Martin Kinnier, O.B.E.

== The Ortega and the escape from Dresden ==
On 18 September 1914 Captain Kinnier was the commander of the Ortega which was traveling southward along the Chilean coast from Valparaiso to Montevideo. In addition to a valuable cargo of £117,000, the Ortega was carrying 300 French reservists as well as confidential mail from the Admiralty. When the Ortega was some 50 miles from the entrance to the Straits of Magellan through which she intended to pass, she sighted a German cruiser, Dresden, approaching on an opposite course. The Ortega was only capable of a maximum speed of 14 knots whereas the cruiser could achieve a speed of 20 knots. Captain Kinnier ordered a change of course for Cape George. Notwithstanding the ship's engineers achieved a speed of 18 knots, the Dresden soon came within range and a shot from her foremost gun fell alongside the ship as a signal to heave to. Captain Kinnier, however, ignored the signal, and continued on his course, driving the ship as fast as he could. The Dresden then opened fire in earnest, but the Ortega, stern on, did not present a large target and none of the shots took effect.

Chancing all risks in the shallow and uncharted channels of Nelson Strait, Captain Kinnier succeeded in reaching waters where it was impossible for the Dresden to follow. Lowering some boats he sent them ahead of the ship to take soundings, and by following slowly in their wake, Captain Kinnier succeeded eventually in working his way through nearly one hundred miles of narrow and tortuous channel and emerged into the Straits of Magellan. Subsequently, Captain Kinnier navigated his command into Smyth's Channel and thereafter Rio de Janeiro, "without even having a scratch on his plates".

In honour of his actions, Captain Kinnier was awarded the Distinguished Service Cross by King George V who also conferred upon him an honorary lieutenancy in the Royal Naval Reserve. Captain Kinnier was later honoured by the French Government which presented him with a gold chronometer and by the Admiralty which gave him a silver plate in commemoration of his services during the First World War. Using the funds of a public subscription, the Lord Mayor of Liverpool presented Captain Kinnier with a silk Union flag which was later presented by the family to Saltcoats Burgh Council in May 1931.

== Later Accounts of the Escape of the Ortega ==
In his 1927 book, Sea Escapes and Adventures, Commander Taprell Dorling D.S.O. commemorated Kinnier's exploits thus: "Seldom have honours been better deserved. Pursued by a vessel which could have blown his ship out of the water with a single broadside, nobody could have blamed Captain Kinnier if he had hauled down his colours and surrendered. But this was not the sort of stuff of which British captains are made. Loyally helped by his officers and men, with great presence of mind and an excellent display of seamanship and navigation, he first escaped from his enemy and then brought his ship to safety through a channel dangerous enough to appal the stoutest heart, doing so without denting a single plate. Captain Kinnier had taken a huge risk, but came through with flying colours. His behaviour affords a shining example of the splendid spirit which animated the officers and men throughout those stormy and nerve-racking days of the worldwide war".

Similar sentiments were expressed by Captain Frank Shaw in his history of the British Merchant Navy, Flag of the Seven Seas: "But this instance of British Merchant Navy resourcefulness is illuminating. In the very waters where Drake - himself a merchant seanman - displayed the courage and resourcefulness that blazoned the name of England through the then-known world, another merchantman, also inspired with the tradition of the sea, which demands of its devotees that there shall be no surrender so long as life persists, signally thwarted a greedy enemy and snatched a valuable ship and many more valuable lives from capture or possible death. Men like Captain Kinnier of the Ortega may not have monuments erected to their memory in Westminster Abbey, but they live enshrined in the hearts of patriots".

The escape of the Ortega was also used as the basis for the short novel Tom Chatto RNR.

Captain Kinnier died on Christmas Eve 1916 following surgery to repair an ulcer. He was buried in Bebington Cemetery on 30 December 1916.
