= Manuel Rodríguez Island =

Island in Chile

Coordinates: 52.565949°S 73.852882°W

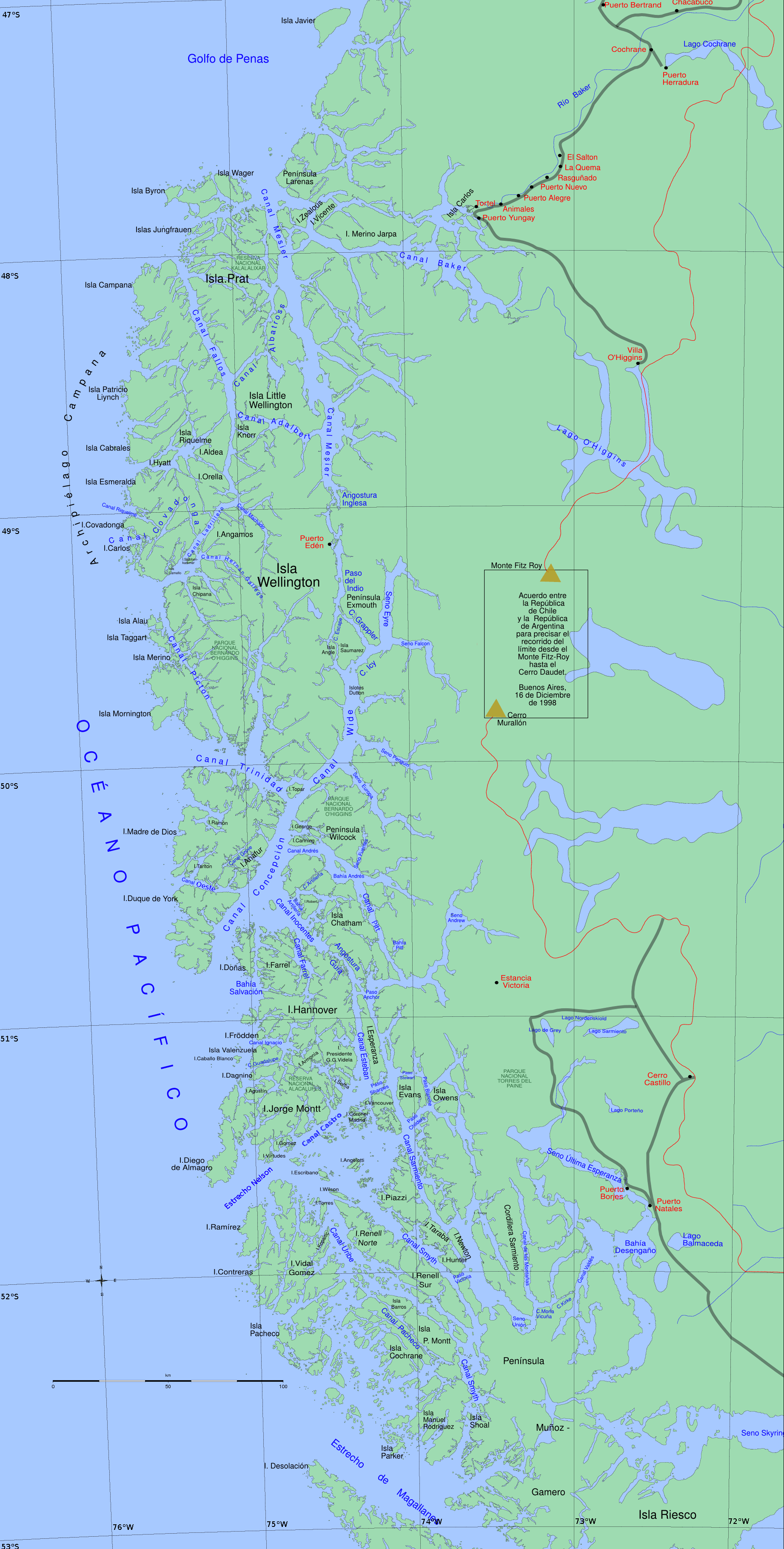
Manuel Rodríguez Island north of the west mouth of the Strait of Magellan

Manuel Rodríguez Island (Spanish: Isla Manuel Rodríguez) is an island in the Queen Adelaide Archipelago in Magallanes y la Antártica Chilena Region, Chile. It has an area of 466 km^{2} (180 sq mi).

It is bounded on the east by the Smyth Channel and on the south by the Strait of Magellan.
