= Birkdale =

Birkdale may refer to:

== Places ==
=== Australia ===
- Birkdale, Queensland, a suburb of Redland City, Australia
  - Birkdale railway station, Brisbane

=== New Zealand ===
- Birkdale, New Zealand, a suburb of Auckland

=== United Kingdom ===
- Birkdale, Southport, a suburb of Southport, Sefton, Merseyside, England
  - Birkdale (ward), an electoral ward
  - Birkdale railway station
  - Royal Birkdale Golf Club
- Birkdale, North Yorkshire, a dale in the Yorkshire Dales National Park, England

=== United States ===
- Birkdale Village, near Huntersville, North Carolina, USA

== Other uses ==
- Birkdale (ship), built 1892
- Birkdale School, a school in Sheffield, South Yorkshire, United Kingdom
