= Katherine Everett =

Anglo-Irish writer (1872–1954)

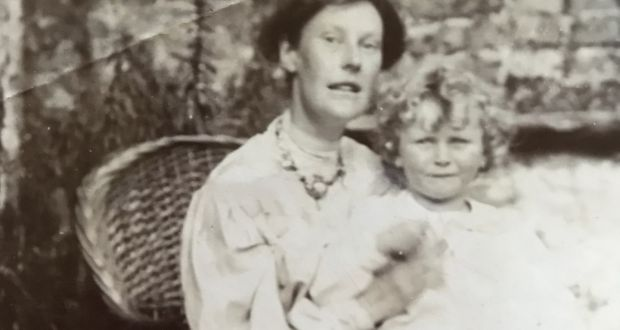
- Born: Kathleen Olive Herbert; 1872; Cahernane House, County Kerry, Ireland
- Died: 1954 (aged 81–82); England

Katherine Everett (1872 – 1954) was an Anglo-Irish writer, memorist, and designer of houses and gardens.

== Life ==
Katherine Everett was born Kathleen Olive Herbert in 1872 in Cahernane House, County Kerry. Her father was Henry Herbert of the Muckross estate. Everett had a difficult and unhappy relationship with her mother, leading her to leave home as a teenager living with relatives or others as a companion. She attended the Slade Art School, where she got to know her first cousin, John Everett. They married in 1901 and had two sons, Henry, born 1902 and Anthony, born 1906. Her husband would leave for long periods at a time, eventually leaving Everett in 1914 with two young sons and no income. She worked for a time as a nurse, in various hospitals including Mercer's Hospital, Dublin. Later she became a gardener and companion to the Baring banking family. From 1915 she and her sons lived in a Georgian house, Sybil Hill, which belonged to the widowed Lady Ardilaun. She was Everett's distant cousin and godmother. After Lady Ardilaun's death in 1925, Everett left Ireland and never returned. She lived for a time in British Columbia, and Italy, before settling in England.

During her lifetime, Everett became renowned for the designs and renovations of houses and gardens, primarily in England. She started by becoming a building contractor to support herself and her sons. Everett and her young son Anthony were the subject of Henry Tonks' 1908 drawing, Summer.

Everett died in England in 1954.

== Writing ==
She published her autobiography, Bricks and Flowers, in 1949 followed by the collection of stories, Walk with Me, in 1951. More recent examinations of her autobiography have viewed it as a queer text, particularly in relation to the unorthodox way in which Everett lived as a woman supporting herself and her children. She recounts episodes during the Irish Civil War, where she travelled across Ireland to salvage furniture from the houses of Lady Ardilaun. Bricks and Flowers was reissued in 2018.
