= Pacheco Island =

Island in Chile

Native name: Isla Pacheco
- Location within Southern Patagonia

Geography
- Coordinates: 52.251548°S 74.774022°W
- Archipelago: Queen Adelaide Archipelago
- Adjacent to: Pacific Ocean
- Area: 156.8 km^{2} (60.5 sq mi)
- Coastline: 91.9 km (57.1 mi)

Administration
- Chile
- Region: Magallanes y la Antártica Chilena

Additional information
- NGA UFI=-894547

Pacheco Island is an island between Vidal Gomez Island and Victoria Island at the north shore of the West entrance of the Strait of Magellan in Chile.

== See also ==
- List of islands of Chile
