= Smyth Channel =

Body of water in southern Chile

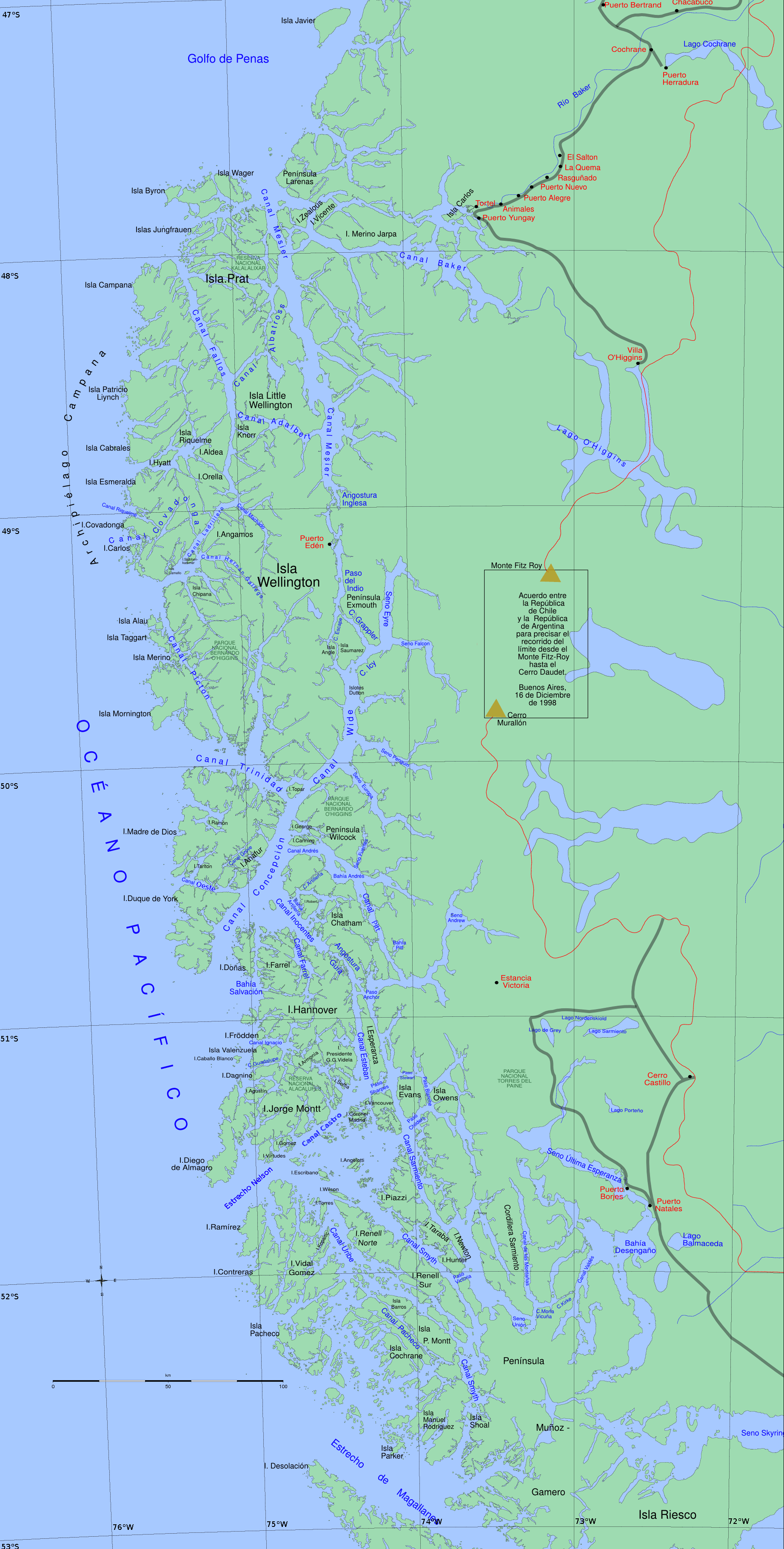
Smyth Channel on the east side of Pedro Montt Island and Rennell Island

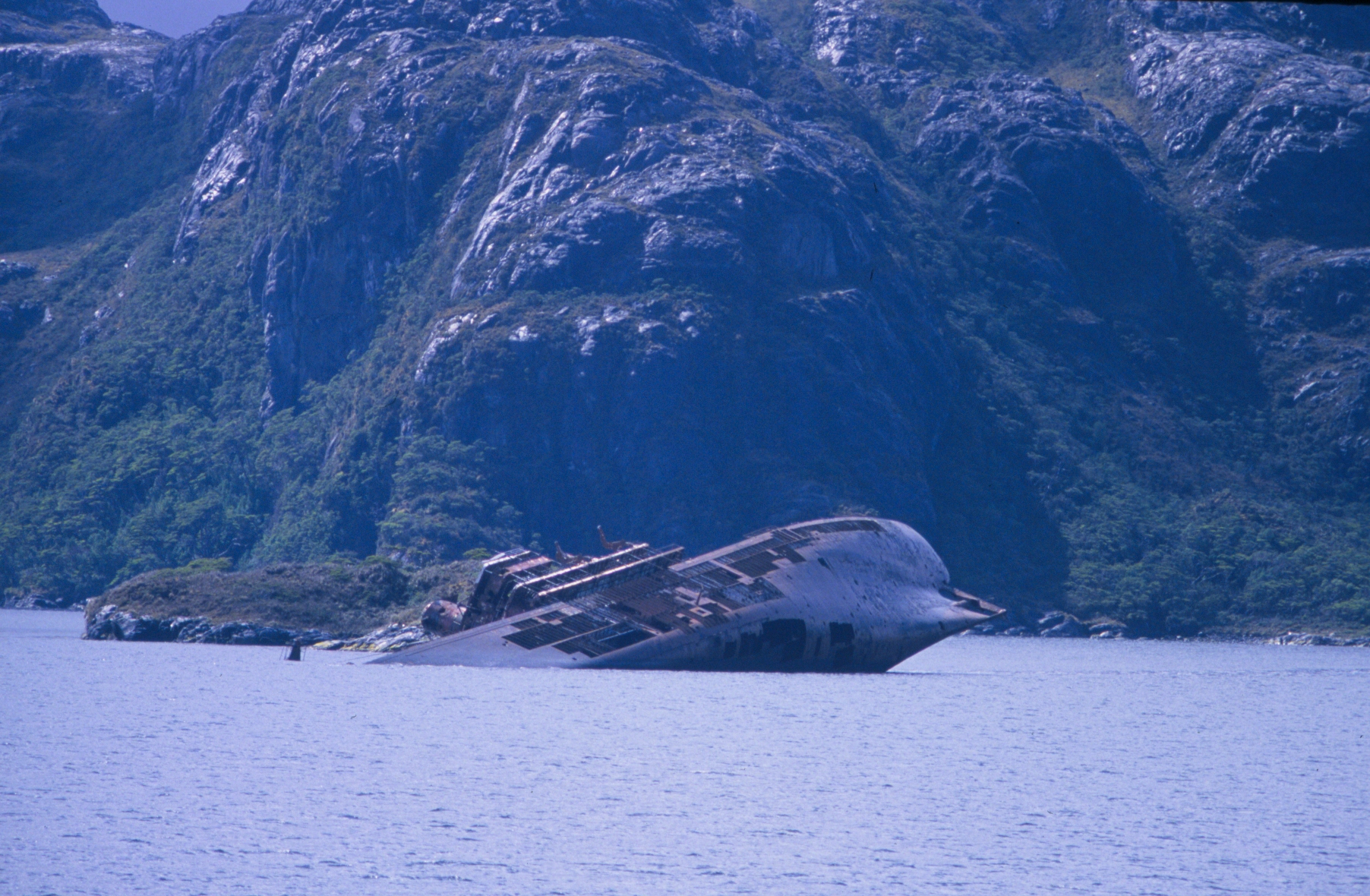
Shipwreck of the SS Santa Leonor

Smyth Channel (Spanish: Canal Smyth) is a principal channel in Patagonia. Its south arm is the southward continuation of the Sarmiento Channel and is located in Magallanes y Antártica Chilena Region. The Kawésqar people lived along its coast for thousands of years.

Its north entrance is in the Nelson Strait at 51°36′10″S 74°48′12″W, between Charlton Cape and the western extreme of the Lobos Islands; and its southern terminus is at 52°46′05″S 73°50′10″W, between Phillip Cape at the southern extreme of Manuel Rodriguez Island and Merino Peninsula on the mainland, where it opens into the Strait of Magellan.

The channel has a length of approximately 96 nmi and is divided into two arms: the northwest arm, which is scarcely used as navigation route and is 50 nmi long, and the south arm (46 nmi long), which is a major waterway for commercial sailing and that stretches from its connection with the Sarmiento Channel at southern tip of the Victoria Pass until the point already named, where it joins to the Strait of Magellan.

The channel is flanked by mountain ranges of exposed granite that at their foothills have limited vegetation cover, because the continuous winds that blow against it.

In the northwest arm the hills are high, including the Monte Nuestra Señora de la Victoria (890 m) and the Lecky Look Out (890 m) on the Contreras Island, and the Monte Lucía of 510 m on the Diego de Almagro Island.

In the vicinity of its south arm is Monte Burney, which lie on Muñoz Gamero Peninsula in mainland. This imposing volcanic peak stands out from the mountains that surround it. Other mountains in the area include Monte Joy (443 m) and the peaks Sainte Agnes and Sainte Anne with elevations of 323 and 513 m high respectively, which stand on the Manuel Rodríguez Island.

The tidal currents are stable and weak, but influenced by the wind.

On the south branch, there are a number of lighthouses, buoys and beacons as a pilotage aid, which are located specialty at the passes Summer and Shoal, and at the channels Gray and Mayne, all of which lie along its course. There exist special instructions for the navigation in the places mentioned.

In the Shoal Pass lies the hull of the wrecked ship SS Santa Leonor and at its southern end lie the wrecked steamships Moraleda, Magada, Ponte Verde and Recreo

== Name ==
The channel was named in 1829 by the British sailors Skyring and Graves, members of Captain Phillip Parker King's survey, in honour of the naval officer W.H. Smyth under whom they had served in the Mediterranean.

== See also ==
- Media related to Category:Santa Leonor shipwreck at Wikimedia Commons
- Fjords and channels of Chile
- List of fjords, channels, sounds and straits of Chile
- List of islands of Chile
- List of lighthouses and lightvessels in Chile
