= USS Riverside (APA-102) =

1944 Bayfield-class ship

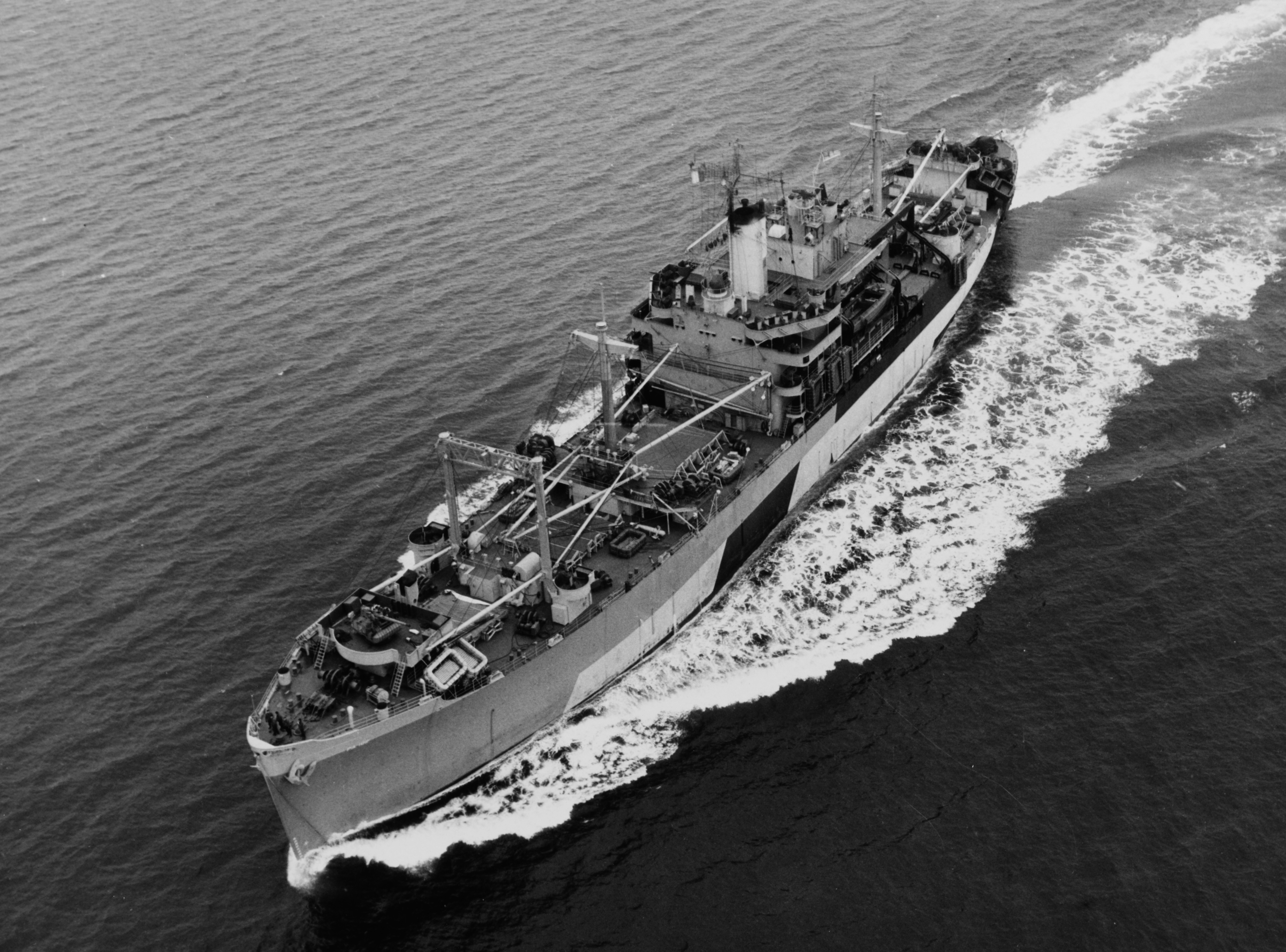
- Riverside on 21 December 1944

History

United States
- Namesake: Riverside County, California
- Ordered: as C3-S-A2 hull, MC hull 870
- Laid down: 11 November 1943
- Launched: 13 April 1944
- Acquired: 29 June 1944
- Commissioned: USS Riverside (APA-102), 29 June 1944
- Decommissioned: 27 April 1946
- Stricken: 8 May 1946
- Identification: IMO number: 5242093
- Fate: Returned to the Maritime Commission, 28 April 1946

General characteristics
- Displacement: 8,100 t.(lt) 16,100 t.(fl)
- Length: 492 ft 6 in (150.11 m)
- Beam: 69 ft 6 in (21.18 m)
- Draught: 26 ft 6 in (8.08 m)
- Propulsion: one General Electric geared drive turbine; two Foster-Wheeler D-type boilers; single propeller; design shaft horsepower 8,500
- Speed: 18 kts.
- Boats & landing craft carried: twelve LCVPs; four LCM (Mk-6)s; three LCP(L) (MK-IV)s
- Capacity: 180,500 cu. ft, 4,800 t.
- Complement: 51 Officers, 524 Enlisted; Flag: 43 Officers, 108 Enlisted
- Armament: two single 5 in (130 mm) dual purpose gun mounts one fore and one aft; two single 40 mm AA gun mounts; two twin 40 mm AA gun mounts; eighteen single 20 mm AA gun mounts

USS Riverside (APA-102) was a Bayfield-class attack transport in service with the United States Navy from 1944 to 1946. In 1948, she was sold into commercial service. She sank in Smyth Channel, Chile, in 1968.

== History ==
The second U.S. Navy ship to be named Riverside, she was laid down on 11 November 1942 by the Ingalls Shipbuilding Co., Pascagoula, Mississippi, under Maritime Commission contract (M.C. hull 870); launched 13 April 1944; sponsored by Mrs. Sidney Swan; acquired by the Navy on loan charter; designated APA-102; and commissioned on 29 June 1944. Then ordered to New York City for conversion to an attack transport at the Atlantic Basin Iron Works yard, she was decommissioned on 8 July, converted, and recommissioned on 18 December 1944.

=== Pacific War ===
After shakedown in Chesapeake Bay, Riverside proceeded to Davisville, Rhode Island; loaded men and equipment of the 81st Construction Battalion; and departed for the Pacific Ocean. Transiting the Panama Canal on 30 January 1945, she continued on to Pearl Harbor, arriving on 15 February. She then carried patients and passengers to California. In mid-April, she returned to Hawaii; conducted amphibious landing exercises through May; tested equipment and trained personnel in cargo handling in June; and in mid-June got underway on another Hawaii-California run. At the end of the month, she shifted from San Pedro, California, to Portland, Oregon, for availability, and in early July steamed west with reinforcements for Okinawa.

Steaming via Guam and Ulithi, Riverside, flagship of Transport Squadron 21, arrived at the Hagushi anchorage on 12 August and discharged her cargo and passengers. Two days later the war ended. She then shifted around to Buckner Bay, whence she proceeded to the Philippines to embark U.S. Army occupation troops for Korea. From Korea she returned to Okinawa and toward the end of October joined the "Operation Magic Carpet" fleet to bring American troops back to the United States. At the end of January 1946, she completed her second trans-Pacific "Magic-Carpet" run. She then made a round trip to Hawaii and, in mid-February, she departed San Francisco, California, for the U.S. East Coast and inactivation.

=== Decommissioning and fate ===
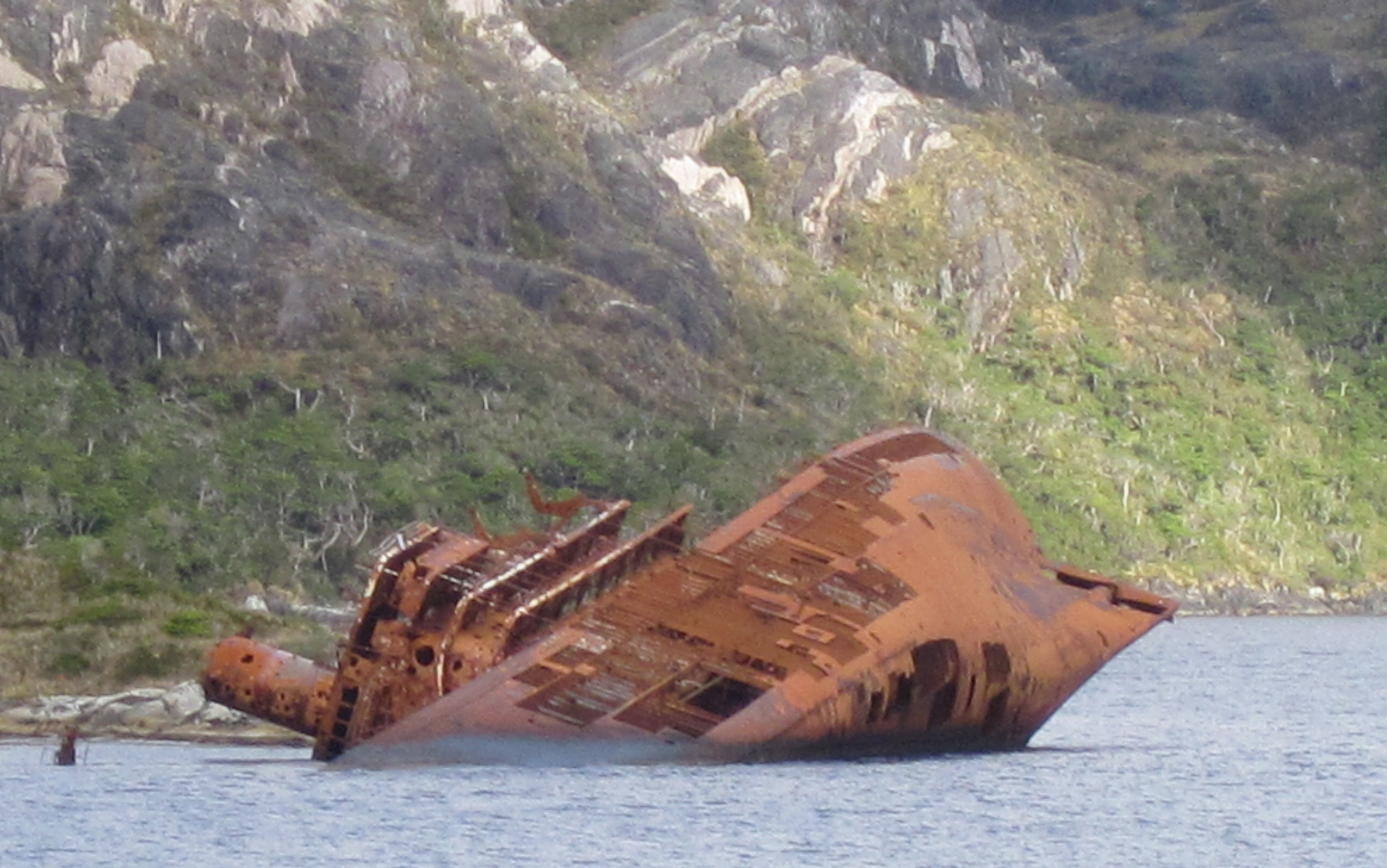
The shipwreck in 2012

Riverside arrived at Norfolk, Virginia, on 5 March 1946. Decommissioned on 27 April, she was redelivered to the Maritime Commission's War Shipping Administration on the 28th. Her name was struck from the Navy list on 8 May 1946, and she was sold to Pacific Argentina Brazil lines (P&T) in December 1948, renamed SS P&T Forester. She was sold to Moore McCormack Lines Inc. in March, 1957, renamed SS Mormacwave and sold for the final time to Grace Lines Inc. in August, 1966, renamed SS Santa Leonor. She was wrecked on 31 March 1968 on Isabel Island, in the Smyth Channel where her partially submerged wreck remains.
