= Birkdale (ship) =

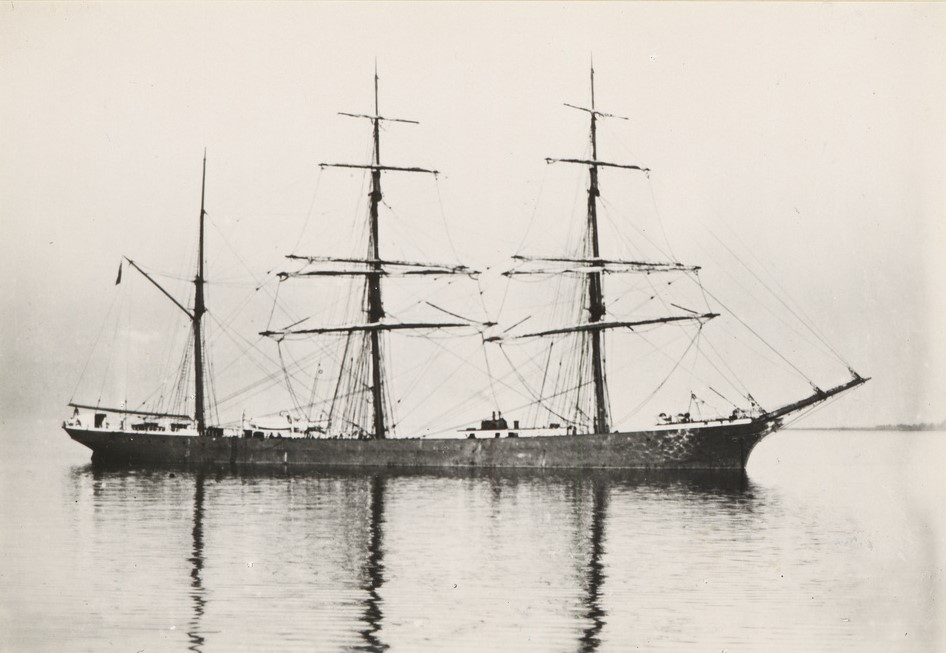
- Birkdale at anchor

History
- Name: Birkdale
- Builder: C. J. Bigger of Derry, Ireland
- Completed: 1892
- Fate: Wrecked 27 June 1927 in the Nelson Strait

General characteristics
- Type: Barque
- Tonnage: 1,483 GRT; 1,389 NRT

Birkdale, a steel, steam-powered barque, is best known for being the inspiration behind many paintings by John Everett. Everett joined the barque Birkdale (as third mate) in 1920 and on a short voyage drew and painted many drawings and paintings, most of which are hung in the National Maritime Museum at Greenwich. She was the last barque to fly the Red Ensign, and she spent almost all her working life carrying nitrate from Chile. In June 1927, Birkdale ran aground and wrecked after catching fire in the Nelson Strait while en route to Peru.

== Career ==
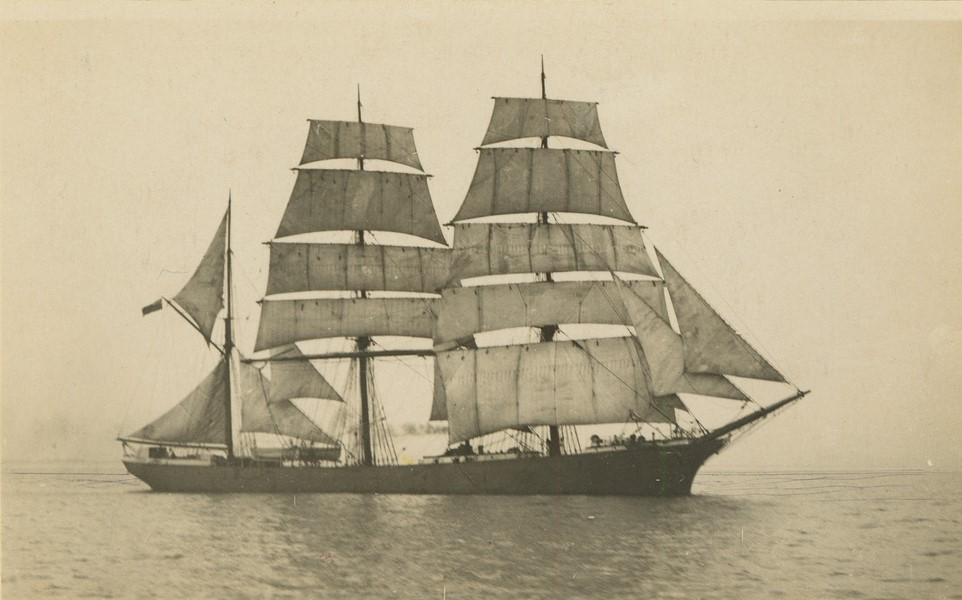
Birkdale under sail

Built in 1892, by C. J. Bigger of Derry, Ireland, 1,483 gross register tons (GRT) , 1,389 net register tons (NRT). Her original owner was Peter Iredale.

For one year (1897) she was registered in Liverpool by Chadwick, Wainright & Co., registered her at Derry, Ireland. In 1911 she voyaged from Delagoa Bay to Port Adelaide arriving 27 November and may have been photographed. In May 1912 after drifting for 52 days, she was sighted badly damaged by the French steamer Felix Touache. After World War I she switched for a short time to delivering sulphur from Texas to the Cape of Good Hope.

Birkdale returned to the nitrate trade, and from 1897 to 1924 she was owned by the Helenslea Sailing Ship Co, of Liverpool, England.

== John Everett ==
On 22 April 1920, Herbert Barnard John Everett took his first voyage after World War I, by joining the barque as third mate sailing out of Bristol via the Straits of Yucatán, for Sabine Pass, Port Arthur, Texas, a voyage which would take in April and June 1920. This voyage resulted in many drawings and paintings.

Birkdale was to take sulphur from Texas to the Cape of Good Hope, but on arrival in Texas she was re-chartered to Australia, which would have meant a longer voyage and going via Cape Horn. Everett's intention was to have continued to Cape Town but, after the change of destination, he reluctantly left her and returned home by steam ship.

== Later career and fate ==
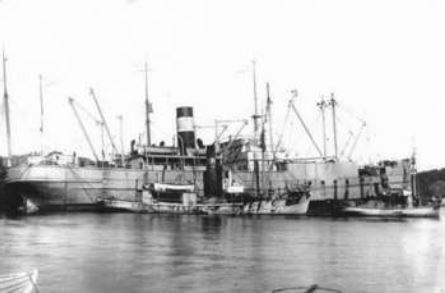
SS Porvenir, circa 1925

Helenslea sold her in 1924, and from 1924 to 1927 she was with G. Ronald, at Callao, Peru.

On 19 February 1927, she left Hull, and the Humber River in England with a cargo of coal for Callao, Peru. On 24 June 1927, a fire broke out west of and near Cambridge Island, Chile. The ship adrift ran aground on the island Islas Lobos, in the Nelson Strait on 27 June 1927. The crew took to a lifeboat, six sailors disappeared over the side, the captain and the rest of the crew were rescued by a Chilean ship, registered in Norway, Porvenir (1918) and landed in Punta Arenas.

== Notes ==
She was not the only ship to be portrayed by Everett, he made at least 16 voyages as crew. Most notably in May 1898 he sailed aboard Iquique, built 1892 from London, via South Africa to Australia, and back in 1899. He recorded that trip in drawings, sketches and photographs.
