= John Everett =

English painter

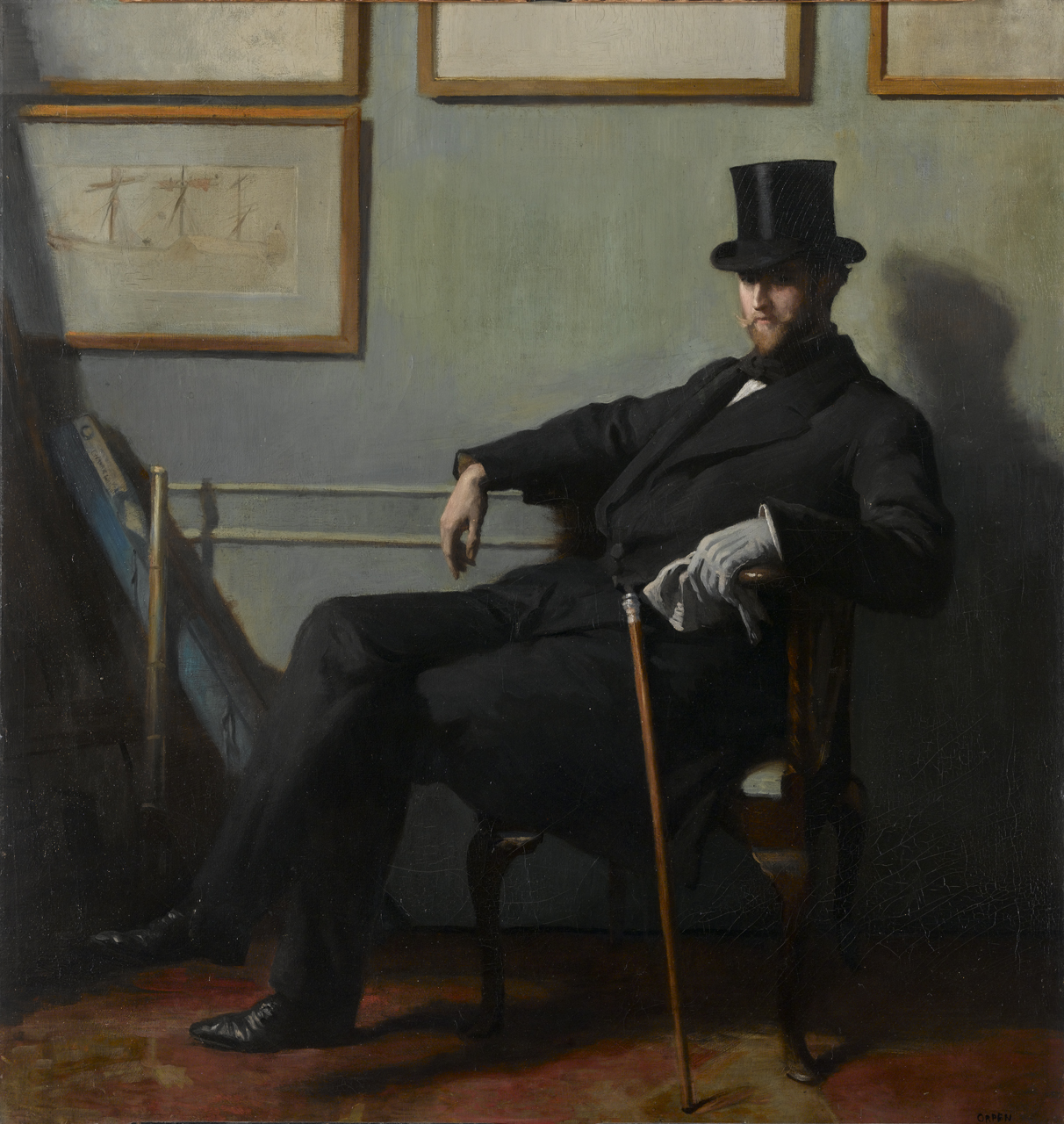
- Herbert Barnard John Everett by William Orpen
- Born: Herbert Barnard John Everett; 18 August 1876; Dorchester, Dorset, England
- Died: 22 February 1949 (aged 72); London, England
- Known for: Painting, drawing
- Movement: Landscape and marine art

Herbert Barnard John Everett (18 August 1876 – 22 February 1949), was an English painter.

== Biography ==
Known as Herbert by his family, he was born in Dorchester, Dorset. on 18 August 1876. He chose to be called John from 1901. His father Rev. Henry Everett was Rector of Holy Trinity in Dorchester and his mother, Augusta Stewart (also known as Aurelia) could trace her maternal ancestry back to Viscount Sackville, third son of the Duke of Dorset and her paternal to the 7th Earl of Galloway and the 7th Earl of Wemyss. Herbert was their only son.

In the 1880s his parents had contacts with Thomas and Emma Hardy who spent time there before moving to Max Gate. In the autumn of 1896 after his father died, Everett went to London to enroll at the Slade School of Fine Art. After studying briefly at the Académie Julian in Paris, Everett's life took an unconventional path when he embarked on the first of his 16 sea voyages. He signed on in the London docks, as a working member of the crew of the sailing ship Iquique in 1898, travelling to Sydney and returning in 1899. Back in London in 1899, Everett returned to the Slade, working and socializing with his fellow students who formed part of London's café society. They all went on painting excursions to Cornwall and France, and these trips had a profound effect on their work. In 1901 he married his Irish cousin and fellow Slade student, Kathleen Olive Herbert (known as Katherine).

After their marriage, he and his wife Katherine initially lived in Fitzroy Street, London, and went on honeymoon at sea, arranging passage to Australia on a 700-ton barque. The trip took 117 days and was intended as an opportunity for John Everett to paint, but according to his wife's autobiography it was "...the one thing he had not done and never did on that voyage."

Around 1904 the Herberts moved to Wool in Dorset, renting the Woolbridge Manor House that belonged to a Mrs. Drax and had been the home of the Turbervilles. Because of this, they were visited by Thomas Hardy and Katherine, herself also an artist, copied the frescos from the Manor House's walls which were reproduced in his novel.

It was at Wool that the Everetts' first son Henry was born in 1904. He was an ill child who initially failed to thrive, and Katherine was left to look after him on her own. Herbert eventually returned and the couple moved to Paris and then Swanage where their second child Anthony Blaze was born in 1906.

Some time in 1906/7 the couple moved to Corfe Castle, where they rented a mill house called Arfleet. Katherine and her son Anthony can be seen in the garden of Arfleet in Henry Tonks' 1908 painting Summer. In her autobiography Katherine mentions the execution of this painting, and how neither she or the artist considered it a success, but rather "a confused failure".

The Everetts spent several years at Arfleet, but had to move when claypit excavations nearby threatened to undermine the house. They bought land at Broadstone and designed and built their own home, called Prospect. However, by 1914 their marriage had ended. In Katherine's own words "In the past, if things had been uncomfortable, as for instance directly after my babies were born, Herbert went away, perhaps to Paris or Cornwall or I might not know where he was. This time he informed me that his disappearance was to be final". After this point, John Everett made no effort to see or pay for the education of his children, and his wife Katherine looked after them exclusively.

During the First World War, wartime security regulations restricted Everett from sketching outdoors, however in the spring of 1918, the Ministry of Information asked him to depict London river scenes. Consequently, he received a permit to draw, and in the summer spent every day at the docks.

In 1918 he joined the Merchant Navy as a Seaman; his rank was Fourth Officer.

On 22 April 1920, he joined the barque Birkdale (1892) as third mate, sailing out of Bristol for Sabine, Texas. This voyage between April and June 1920, resulted in many drawings and paintings. At voyage end he returned home by steamer.

His landscape work of his native Dorset became widely known after the rediscovery in 2011 of a set of small oil sketches made on Everett's last visit to Dorset in May 1924. The work was rediscovered through the BBC television programme BBC TV Hidden Paintings of the South at Dorset County Museum, where they had been lying on a shelf ignored for 30 years. The BBC had unearthed Everett's will where he had left the work to Dorset and a search ensued.

Everett had met American writer Ernest Brennecke Jr. and had agreed to collaborate on a project, travelling around the county making illustrations of places featured in the works of the writer Thomas Hardy. for a book Brennecke was writing. Six of the pieces were published in the book in America in 1925, however this book (The Life of Thomas Hardy) was to be banned in Britain through intervention by Hardy himself, who felt it was too inaccurate, and infringed copyright. Hardy also took exception to Brenneke's book Thomas Hardy's universe: a study of a poet's mind, published by Small, Maynard and Company in 1924; which had no illustrations. The artwork sent to New York went missing, however Everett would recover it some years later.

Meanwhile, in 1925, Everett exhibited Hardy Country aquatints at the Camera Club near the Adelphi, London.

1938 marked his last voyage and World War II put an end to his travels, he was to paint and make prints from memory and notes from that point on.

Everett died in London on 22 February 1949.

In 2017 it was found that there are more paintings by John Everett in UK public art collections than any other artist.
