= Juan Guillermos Island =

Island in Chile

Native name: Isla Juan Guillermo
- Location within Southern Patagonia

Geography
- Coordinates: 52°10′0.01″S 74°10′0.01″W
- Adjacent to: Pacific Ocean
- Area: 393 km^{2} (152 sq mi)

Administration
- Chile
- Region: Magallanes
- Province: Última Esperanza
- Commune: Puerto Natales

Additional information
- NGA UFI=-885433

Juan Guillermos Island (also known as Isla Esmeralda) is a Chilean island in the Queen Adelaide Archipelago in Magallanes and Antártica Chilena Region. It is named after the English Captain John Williams Wilson.

It is located north of Cochrane Island, south-west of Barros Arana and Pedro Montt Islands.

== See also ==
- List of islands of Chile
