= Contreras Island =

Island in Chile

Coordinates: 51°59′S 74°57′W

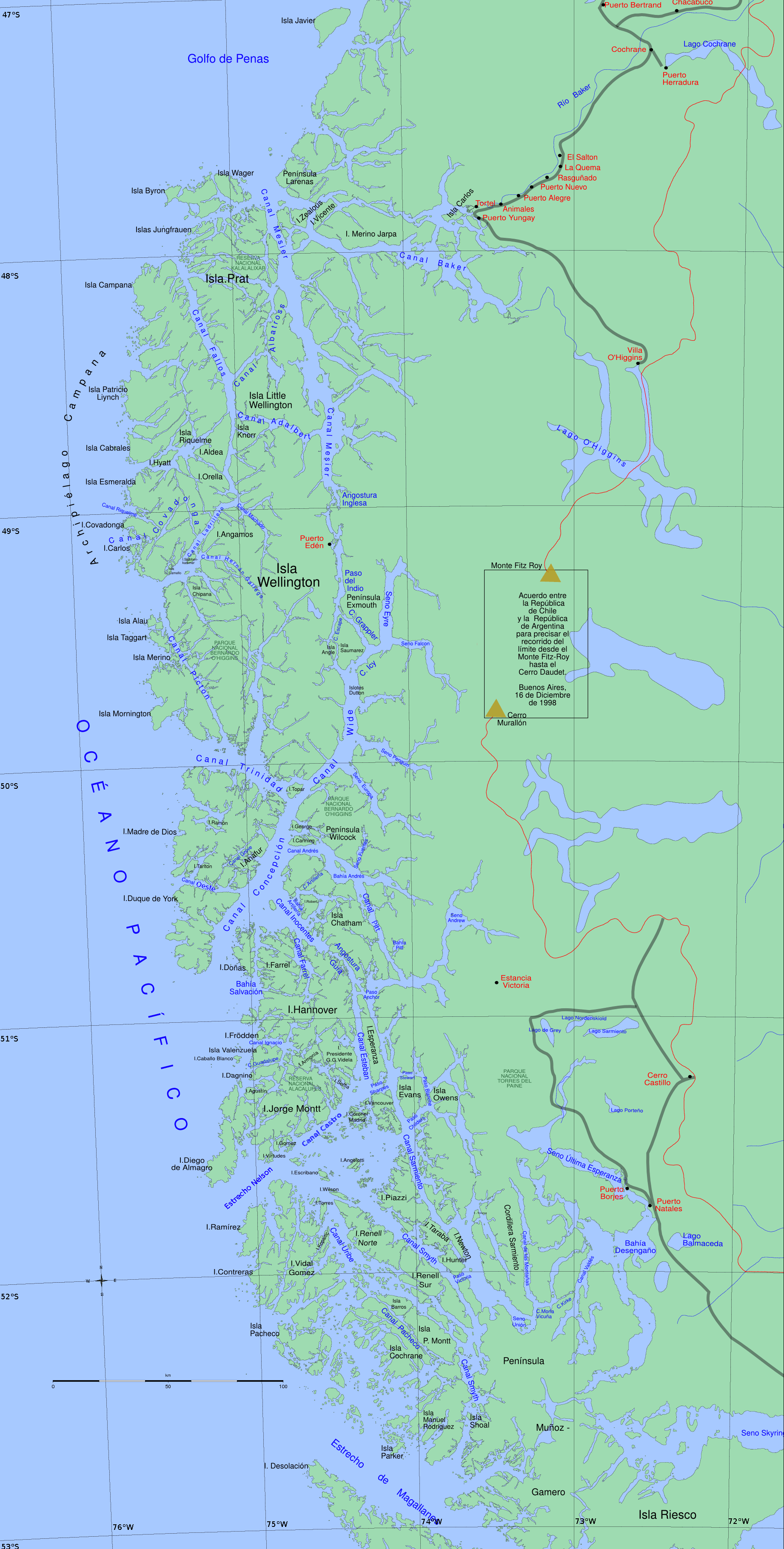
Contreras Island between Pacheco and Ramírez Islands

Contreras Island (Spanish: Isla Contreras) is an island in the Queen Adelaide Archipelago in Magallanes y la Antártica Chilena Region, Chile. Its area is 626 km^{2}.
