= Rennell Islands =

Islands of Chile

Coordinates: 51°57′S 74°07′W

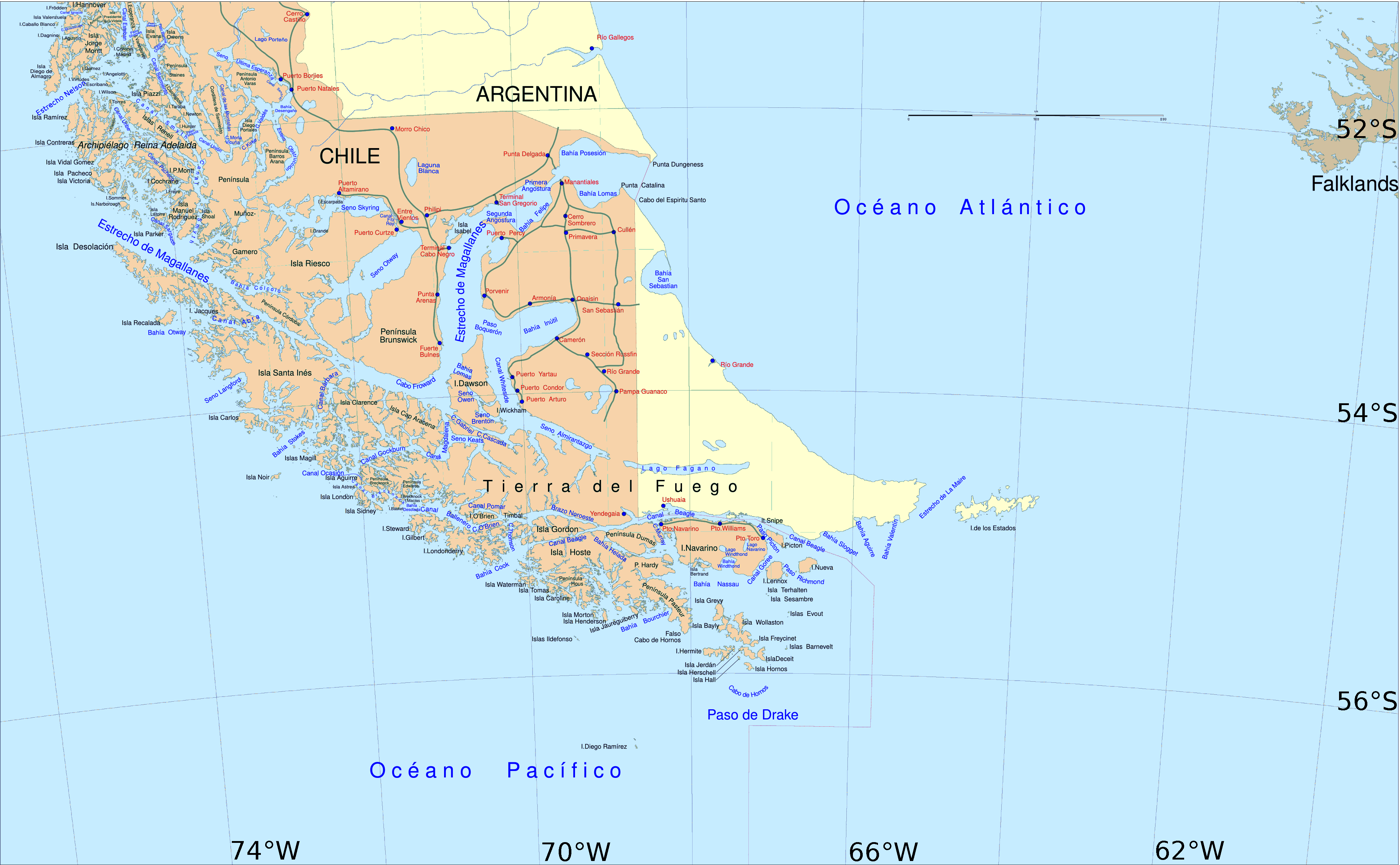
Rennell Islands

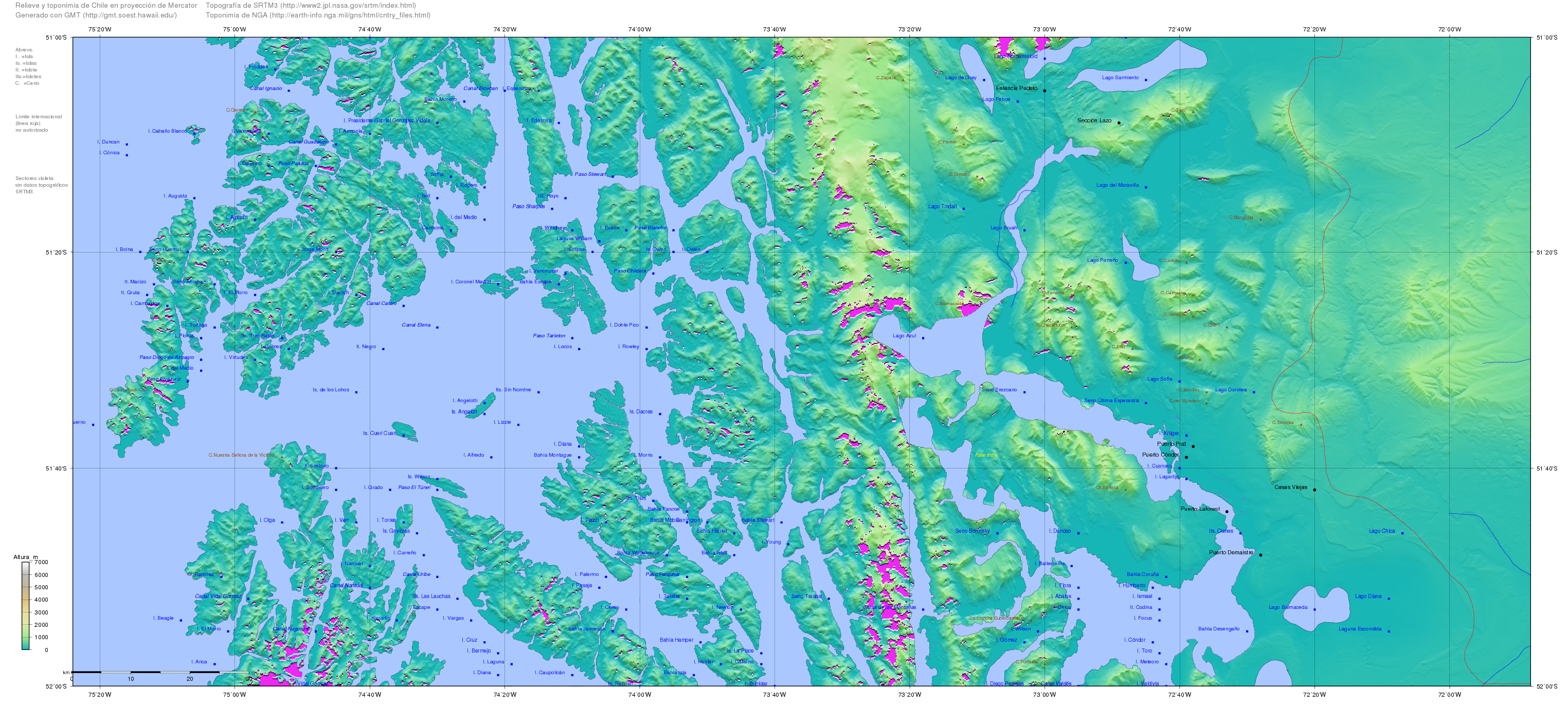
North Rennell Island, 74°0'W, 52°0'S. See also Clickable Map of Chile

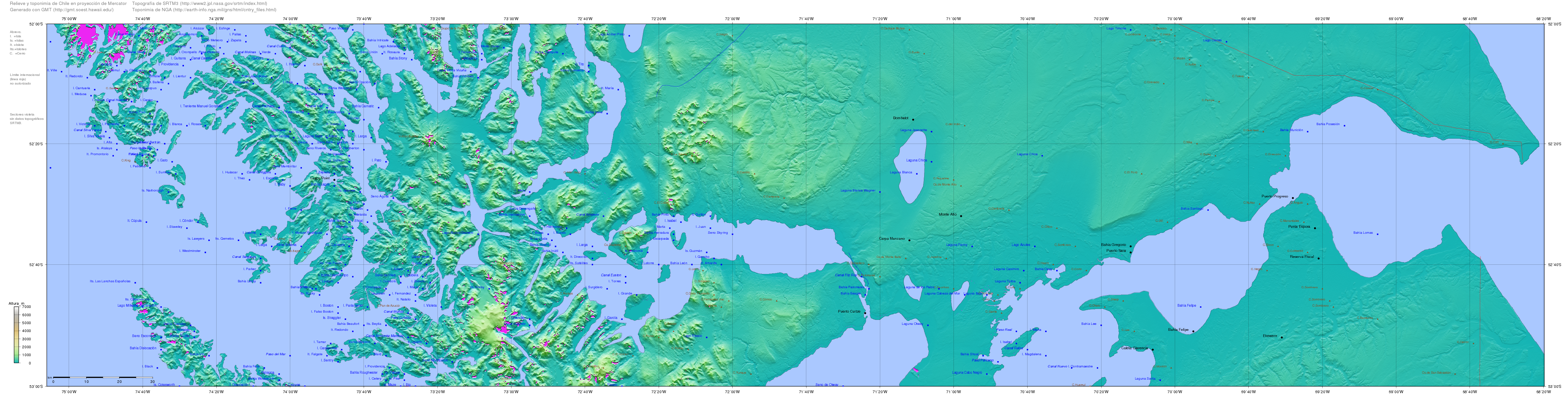
South Rennell Island, 74°0'W, 52°0'S. See also Clickable Map of Chile

The Rennell Islands (Spanish: Islas Rennell) are two islands in the Queen Adelaide Archipelago in Magallanes y la Antártica Chilena Region, Chile. The larger island, South Rennell Island, has an area of 340 km^{2}. The smaller island, North Rennell Island, has an area of 303 km^{2}.

Google Earth shows the passage between the "two" islands to be blocked by a strip of land 30 metres wide.
