= Queen Adelaide Archipelago =

Island group in Zona Austral in Chile

Coordinates: 52.1667°S 74.6667°W

Native name: Archipiélago Reina Adelaida

Geography
- Adjacent to: Pacific Ocean

Administration
- Chile
- Region: Magallanes Region
- Province: Última Esperanza Province
- Commune: Natales

Additional information
- NGA UFI=-898958

Queen Adelaide Archipelago (Spanish: Archipiélago Reina Adelaida) is an island group in Zona Austral, the extreme south of Chile. It belongs to the Magallanes y la Antártica Chilena Region.

The major islands in the group are Pacheco Island, Contreras Island, Ramirez Island, Cochrane Island, Juan Guillermos Island and the Rennell Islands (South Rennell Island and North Rennell Island).

== See also ==
- List of islands of Chile
