= Keith Robert Martin Kinnier =

Captain Keith Robert Martin Kinnier OBE (1902–1969)

Kinnier was a distinguished British seaman, who on 31 December 1943, saved his ship from submarine attack in the seas off Karachi for which actions he was awarded the O.B.E.

== The "Tornus" ==
On New Year's Eve 1943 Captain Kinnier was the commander of the "Tornus" when she was torpedoed by a Japanese submarine off the coast of Karachi. As the citation of Captain Kinnier's award stated "although all navigation aids were wrecked, the ship was kept going at emergency full speed. She was shelled by the submarine but the enemy's fire was returned until the submarine broke off the engagement. The ballast was then shifted to counteract a list which had developed and a fire on board was extinguished". The "Tornus" eventually reached Karachi In the concluding words of the citation "Captain Kinnier showed great courage and determination throughout. He not only fought off the submarine but his sound seamanship in the handling of his vessel resulted in saving this valuable ship"

== Family background ==
Captain Kinnier was the third son and youngest child of Captain Douglas Reid Kinnier, D.S.C., R.N.R.. Born on 16 November 1902, he attended Bickerton House School, Birkdale and later joined the Pacific Steam Navigation Company. In 1933 he married Robina McNeill-Trimble. After the war Captain Kinnier worked for the Anglo-Saxon Petroleum Company and later Shell until he died on 19 May 1969.
