= Nelson Strait (Chile) =

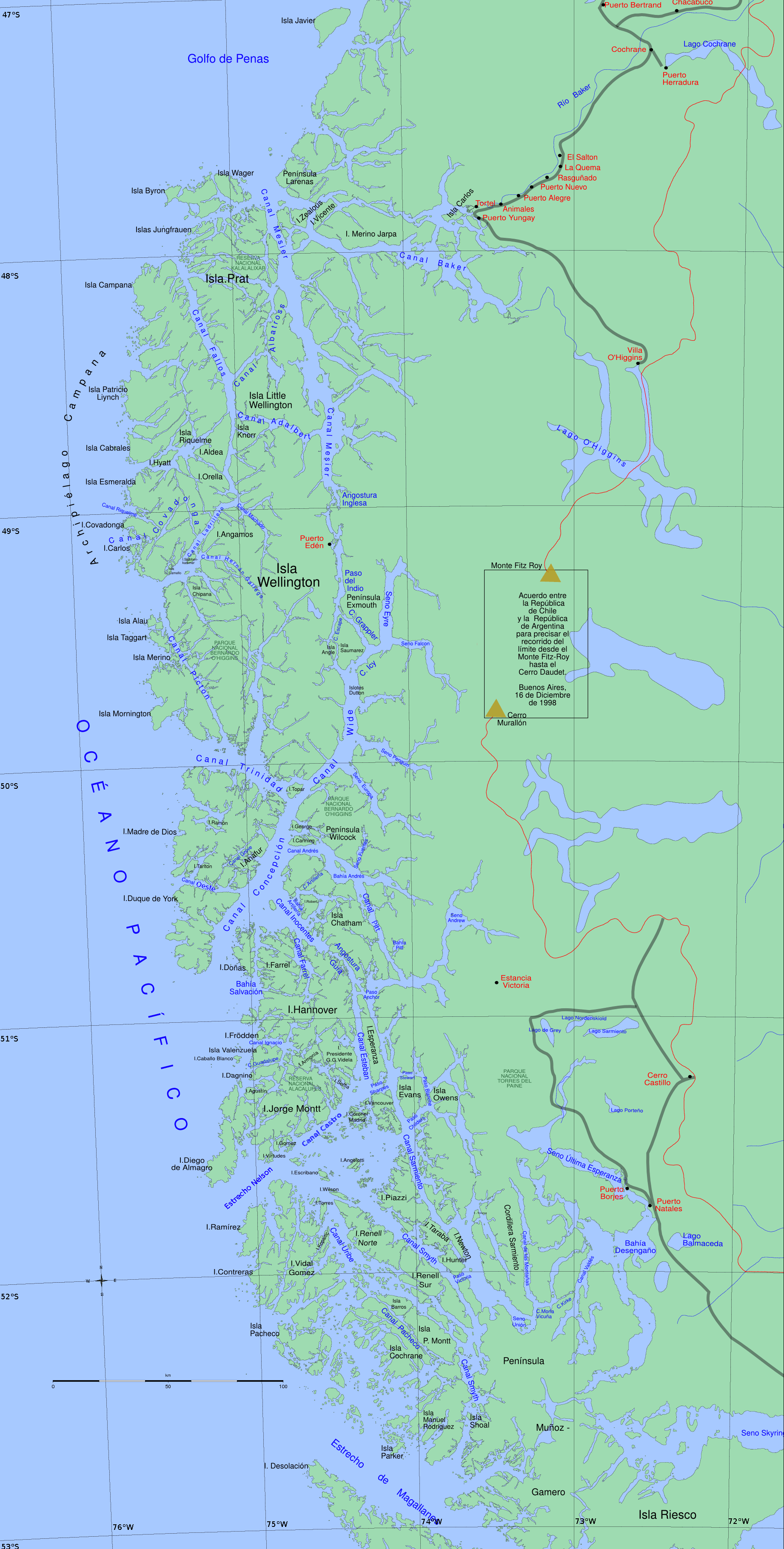
Nelson Strait between Diego de Almagro and Ramírez Islands

Nelson Strait is a channel in the Chilean Archipelago. It is located in Magallanes y Antártica Chilena Region of Chilean Patagonia.

The Strait opens in the west to the Pacific Ocean, at 51°40′S 75°00′W, between the Diego de Almagro Island to the north and Ramírez Island to the south.

The strait widens to the east into a shallow rock-strewn basin which lead into various channels. These are (clock-wise from the north) Esteban, (between the islands of Jorge Montt and Esperanza), Sarmiento (between Vancouver and Piazzi), Smyth (between Piazzi and North Rennell) and Uribe (between Rennell North and Vidal Gomez).

The Nelson Strait is unsuitable for general navigation.

== See also ==
- Nelson Strait (South Shetland Islands)
